= 51st Fighter Wing =

US Air Force unit

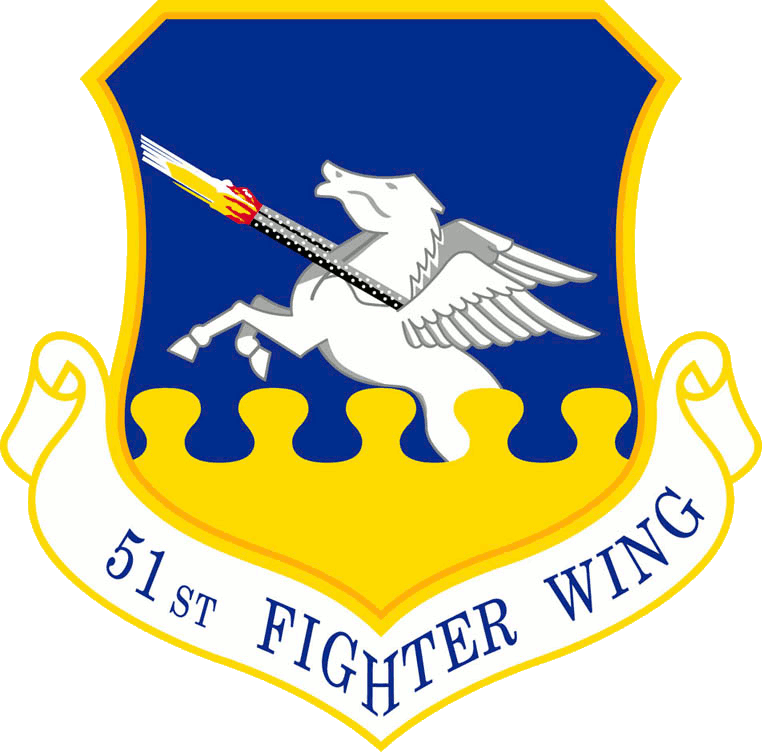
- Active: 1948–1971; 1971–present
- Country: United States
- Branch: United States Air Force
- Part of: Pacific Air Forces
- Garrison/HQ: Osan Air Base, South Korea
- Mottos: Leading the Charge (1993–present); Deftly and Swiftly (former motto)
- Engagements: World War II; Asiatic-Pacific Campaign (1941–1945): Korean Service (1950–1954)
- Decorations: Air Force Outstanding Unit Award (15 Awards); Republic of Korea Presidential Unit Citation (3 Awards)

Commanders
- Current commander: Colonel Ryan B. Ley
- Deputy commander: Colonel Kevin Walsh
- Command Chief: Command Chief Master Sergeant Carl T. Vogel
- Notable commanders: Benjamin O. Davis, Jr. Francis S. "Gabby" Gabreski; John W. Mitchell

The 51st Fighter Wing (51 FW) is a wing of the United States Air Force and the host unit at Osan Air Base, South Korea. The wing has been based in the Far East since 1948, with a short interruption in 1971. It flew operations as the 51st Fighter-Interceptor Wing during the Korean War.

The 51st Fighter Wing is under Pacific Air Forces' Seventh Air Force. The unit is the most forward deployed wing in the world, providing combat ready forces for close air support, air strike control, counter air, interdiction, theater airlift, and communications in the defense of the Republic of Korea. The wing executes military operations to bed-down, maintain and employ follow-on forces for the combined arms base that includes three major flying tenants and large multi-service fighting units.

The wing is equipped with General Dynamics F-16 Fighting Falcon and Fairchild Republic A-10 Thunderbolt II squadrons and myriad base support agencies conducting the full spectrum of missions providing for the defense of the Republic of Korea.

== Mission ==
The mission of the 51st FW is to provide mission-ready Airmen to execute combat operations and receive follow-on forces. The wing accomplishes this mission through:

- Conducting exercises to ensure our forces maintain the highest degree of readiness to defend Osan AB against air and ground attack.
- Maintaining and administering U.S. operations at Osan and five collocated operating bases—Taegu, Suwon, Kwang Ju, Kimhae and Cheong Ju – for reception and bed-down of follow-on forces.
- Providing timely and accurate air power in support of military operations directed by higher headquarters.

== Units ==
The 51st Fighter Wing is composed of four groups each with specific functions. The Operations Group controls all flying and airfield operations. The Maintenance Group performs maintenance of aircraft, ground equipment and aircraft components. The Mission Support Group has a wide range of responsibilities but a few of its functions are Security, Civil Engineering, Communications, Personnel Management, Logistics, Services and Contracting support, whilst the Medical Group provides medical and dental care.

- 51st Operations Group (Tail Code OS)
  - 51st Operations Support Squadron (OSS)
  - 25th Fighter Squadron (25 FS) (A-10/OA-10)
  - 36th Fighter Squadron (36 FS) (Block 40 F-16C/D)
- 51st Mission Support Group
  - Civil Engineer Squadron (CES)
  - Force Support Squadron (FSS)
  - Logistics Readiness Squadron (LRS)
  - Security Forces Squadron (SFS)
  - Communications Squadron (CS)
- 51st Maintenance Group
  - Aircraft Maintenance Squadron (AMXS)
    - 25th Aircraft Maintenance Unit
    - 36th Aircraft Maintenance Unit
  - Maintenance Operations Squadron (MOS)
  - Maintenance Squadron (MXS)
  - Munitions Squadron (MUNS)
- 51st Medical Group
  - Aerospace Medicine Squadron (AMDS)
  - Medical Support Squadron (MDSS)
  - Medical Operations Squadron (MDOS)
  - Dental Squadron (DS)
  - Bioenvironmental Engineering (BE)
- 51st Fighter Wing Staff Agencies
  - Inspector General (IG)
  - Comptroller (CPTS)
  - Entitlements in Korea
  - Safety (SE)
  - Chapel (HC)
  - Legal Office (JA)
  - Protocol (CCP)
  - Command Post (CP)
  - Public Affairs (PA)
  - Equal Opportunity (EO)
  - Historian (HO)
  - Sexual Assault Prevention & Response (SAPR)
  - Wing Plans (XP)
  - AFSO21 (CVO)
  - Information Protection (IP)
  - Community Support Coordinator (CVB)

== History ==
For additional history and lineage, see 51st Operations Group

In 1948, assumed air defense of Ryukyu Islands.

=== Korean War ===
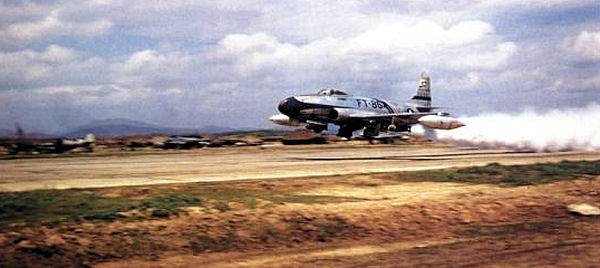
F-80C of the 51st Fighter-Interceptor Wing taking off from Suwon AB with a JATO bottle

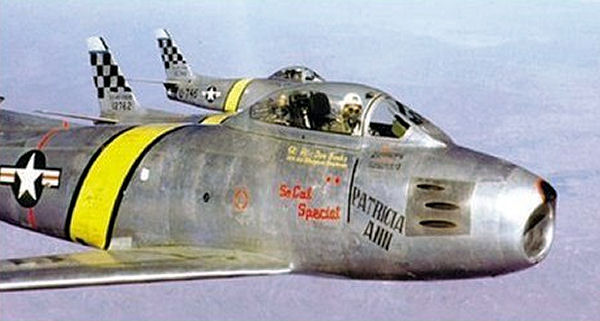
North American F-86E-10-NA Sabres of the 25th Fighter-Interceptor Squadron (51st) FBG over Korea. Identifiable is serial is 51-2742.

With the outbreak of the Korean War in 1950, elements of the 51st FIW were dispatched first to Japan, then to South Korea. Korean War operational squadrons were:

- 16th Fighter-Interceptor Squadron: duration (F-80C, F-86F)
- 25th Fighter-Interceptor Squadron: duration (F-80C, F-8)
- 39th Fighter-Interceptor Squadron: attached 1 June 1952– (F-80C, F-86F)
- 68th Fighter-All Weather Squadron: attached 25 September – 9 October 1950 (F-82F/G)
- 80th Fighter-Bomber Squadron: attached 25 September – 20 December 1950 (F-80C)

It entered combat service flying the F-80C Shooting Star on 22 September of that year, when it moved to Itazuke AB, Japan, to support the breakout of the Eighth U.S. Army from the Pusan Perimeter. For nearly 4 years thereafter, the 51st FIW played a key role in the defense of South Korea despite moving to four different locations within a year and operating under austere conditions.

The wing moved to Kimpo Air Base, South Korea in October only to return to Japan in December, leaving combat elements behind. In May 1951, the 51st FIW moved to Suwon Air Base, southwest of Seoul, but retained maintenance and supply elements at Tsuiki AB, Japan, to provide rear echelon support. In November 1951 the 51st FIW transitioned to the F-86 Sabre with two squadrons (16th, 25th), adding a third squadron (39th) the following May.

The group operated a detachment at Suwon AB, Korea, beginning in May 1951, and relocated there in October 1951, with maintenance and supply elements remaining in Japan until August 1954. The wing ceased combat on 27 July 1953. The 51 FIW's war record was impressive. Wing pilots flew more than 45,000 sorties and shot down 312 MiG-15s; this produced 14 air aces including the top ace of the war, Captain Joseph C. McConnell. The ratio of aerial victories to losses was 10 to 1. Unfortunately, the wing lost 32 pilots to enemy action; however, nine that became prisoners of war were repatriated later.

=== Korean War Aces ===
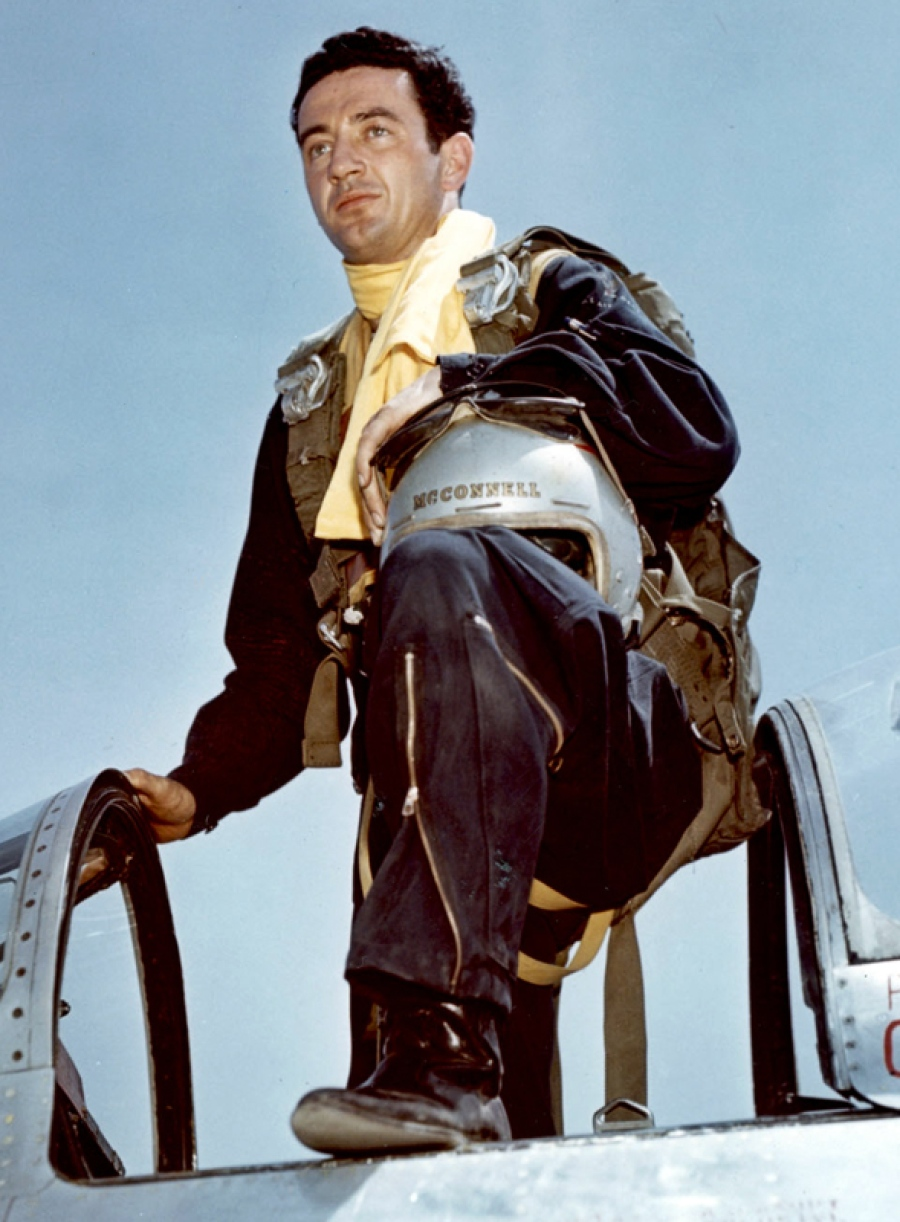
Capt Joseph McConnell, lead US Ace Pilot during the Korean War, achieving 16 Aerial Victories. Official US Air Force Photo.

Aerial Victories	Rank	Name	Unit	Ace	Double Ace	Triple Ace / Notes:
16	Capt	Joseph C. McConnell	39FIS	16 February 1953	24 April 1953	18 May 1953; Top USAF Ace of the Korean War
10	Capt	Harold E. Fischer	39FIS	24 January 1953	21 March 1953	
9	1st Lt	Cecil G. Foster	16FIS	3 May 1952		
8	Lt Col	George I. Ruddell	39FIS	18 May 1953		
7	1st Lt	Henry Buttelmann	25FIS	30 June 1953		2nd youngest Ace (24y/o)
6.5	Col	Francis S. Gabreski	51FIW	1 April 1952		Wing Commander; Top WWII US Ace in European Theater
6.5	Maj	Donald E. Adams	16FIS	3 May 1952		
6	Maj	John F. Bolt	39FIS	11 July 1953		USMC Exchange Pilot
5.5	Maj	William T. Whisner, Jr.	25FIS	23 Feb 1952		First 51FIW Ace; 15.5 Aerial Victories in WWII
5	Col	Robert P. Baldwin	51FIG	22 June 1953		
5	Capt	Iven C. Kincheloe, Jr.	25FIS	6 April 1952		Youngest Korean War Ace (23yrs, 9mos)
5	Capt	Robert H. Moore	16FIS	3 April 1952		
5	Capt	Dolphin D. Overton	16FIS	24 January 1953		
5	Maj	William H. Westcott	25FIS	26 April 1952		

=== Cold War ===
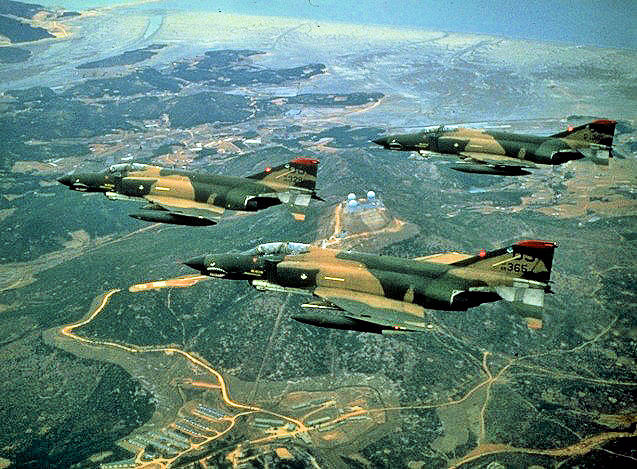
Three 36th Fighter Squadron McDonnell Douglas F-4E-37-MC Phantoms in flight. Serials 68-0328 and 68-0365 identifiable.

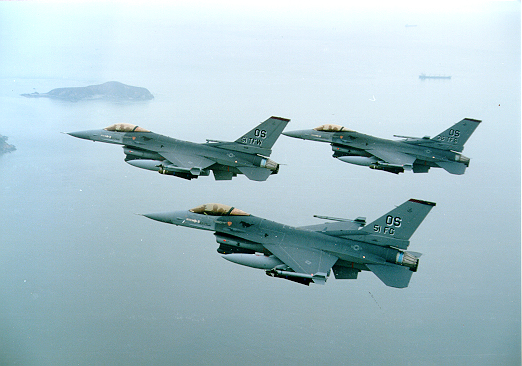
Three 36th Fighter Squadron F-16Cs in flight.

On 1 August 1954, the 51 FIW returned to Naha Air Base to resume air defense coverage of the Ryukyu Islands. Operational squadrons were:

- 16th Fighter-Interceptor Squadron (F-86D, 1954–59), (F102, 1959–1964)
- 25th Fighter-Interceptor Squadron (F-86D, 1954–1960)
- 26th Fighter-Interceptor Squadron (F-86D, 1954–59)

At the same time, the wing demonstrated its mobility readiness in response to three regional crises.

From August 1958 to January 1959, the 51 FIW deployed eight F-86Ds to Ching Chuan Kang Air Base Taiwan to fly combat air support missions for Nationalist Chinese forces after mainland Communist Chinese forces shelled the Nationalist-held islands of Quemoy and Matsu. Six years later, the wing deployed 12 F-102s to the Philippines and South Vietnam from August to October 1964 for air defense against possible Communist North Vietnamese air attacks.

During the Vietnam War, crews of the 51st Fighter Interceptor Wing provided air defense of Naha AB, Okinawa, with F-102s of the 82nd FIS which was assigned to the 51st FIW from Travis AFB in January 1966. During the 1968 Pueblo crisis, the wing deployed 12 of is 33 aircraft to Suwon AB. On 31 May 1971, the 51st FIW was inactivated, ending almost 17 years of service in the Pacific from Naha when it was inactivated as the Air Force began scaling down its activities in Southeast Asia. In 1975 Naha Air Base closed.

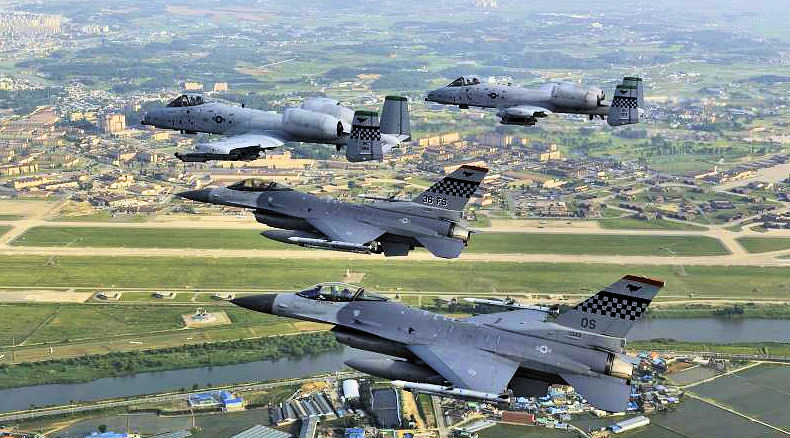
Two Fairchild Republic A-10A Thunderbolt IIs from the 25th Fighter Squadron and two F-16 Fighting Falcons from the 36th Fighter Squadron fly over Osan AB in formation, 2010

The 51st was inactive for only five months. On 1 November 1971, the wing was redesignated the 51st Air Base Wing and activated at Osan Air Base, South Korea. At Osan, the 51st assumed the host responsibilities of the inactivated 6314th Support Wing to include the Koon-ni range and a variety of remote sites. Operational squadrons of the 51st at Osan have been:

Fighter Squadrons

- 25th Fighter Squadron (1992–present A-10, OA-10)
- 36th Fighter Squadron (F-4E 1974–88), (F-16C/D 1988–present)
- 497th Fighter Squadron (F-4E) (1982–84)

On 1 October 1993, after a half-dozen name changes, the wing returned to its original and current designation as the 51st Fighter Wing. Since then, the 51st has continued operating as a fighter/ground attack wing and continues to be tasked to receive and integrate follow-on reinforcing forces to Korea in the event of crisis.

== Lineage ==
- Established as 51 Fighter Wing on 10 August 1948

Activated on 18 August 1948
Redesignated 51 Fighter-Interceptor Wing on 1 February 1950
Inactivated on 31 May 1971

- Redesignated 51 Air Base Wing on 20 October 1971

Activated on 1 November 1971
Redesignated: 51 Composite Wing (Tactical) on 30 September 1974
Redesignated: 51 Tactical Fighter Wing on 1 July 1982
Redesignated: 51 Wing on 7 February 1992
Redesignated: 51 Fighter Wing on 1 October 1993.

=== Assignments ===
- 1st Air Division, 18 August 1948
- Thirteenth Air Force, 1 December 1948
- Twentieth Air Force, 16 May 1949

Attached to Fifth Air Force, 25 September 1950 – 1 August 1954

Further attached to 8th Fighter-Bomber Wing, 25 September – 12 October 1950

- 313th Air Division, 1 March 1955 – 31 May 1971
- 314th Air Division, 1 November 1971
- Seventh Air Force, 8 September 1986–present

=== Components ===
Groups

- 5th Tactical Air Control (later, 5 Tactical Control; 5 Air Control) Group: 8 January 1980 – 20 June 1982; 1 October 1990 – 1 July 1993
- 51st Fighter (later, 51 Fighter-Interceptor, 51 Fighter, 51 Operations) Group: 18 August 1948 – 25 October 1957 (detached 26 September – 12 October 1950, 16 August 1954 – 15 March 1955); 1 October 1990–present

Squadrons

- 16th Fighter-Interceptor Squadron: attached 1 July – 24 October 1957, assigned 25 October 1957 – 24 December 1964
- 19th Tactical Air Support Squadron: 30 September 1974 – 8 January 1980
- 25th Fighter-Interceptor (later, 25 Tactical Fighter) Squadron: attached 1 July – 24 October 1957, assigned 25 October 1957 – 8 June 1960; 1 February 1981 – 31 June 1990
- 36th Tactical Fighter Squadron: 30 September 1974 – 1 October 1990
- 82d Fighter Interceptor Squadron: attached 17 February – 24 June 1966, assigned 25 June 1966 – 31 May 1971 (detached 30 January – 20 February 1968)
- 318th Fighter Interceptor Squadron: attached 11–18 February 1968
- 497th Tactical Fighter Squadron: 1 January 1982 – 24 January 1989
- 555th Tactical Fighter Squadron: attached 11 December 1964 – 15 March 1965 and 11 November 1965 – 25 February 1966
- 558th Tactical Fighter Squadron: attached 12 March – 15 June 1965
- 559th Tactical Fighter Squadron: attached 12 June – 15 November 1965.

=== Stations ===
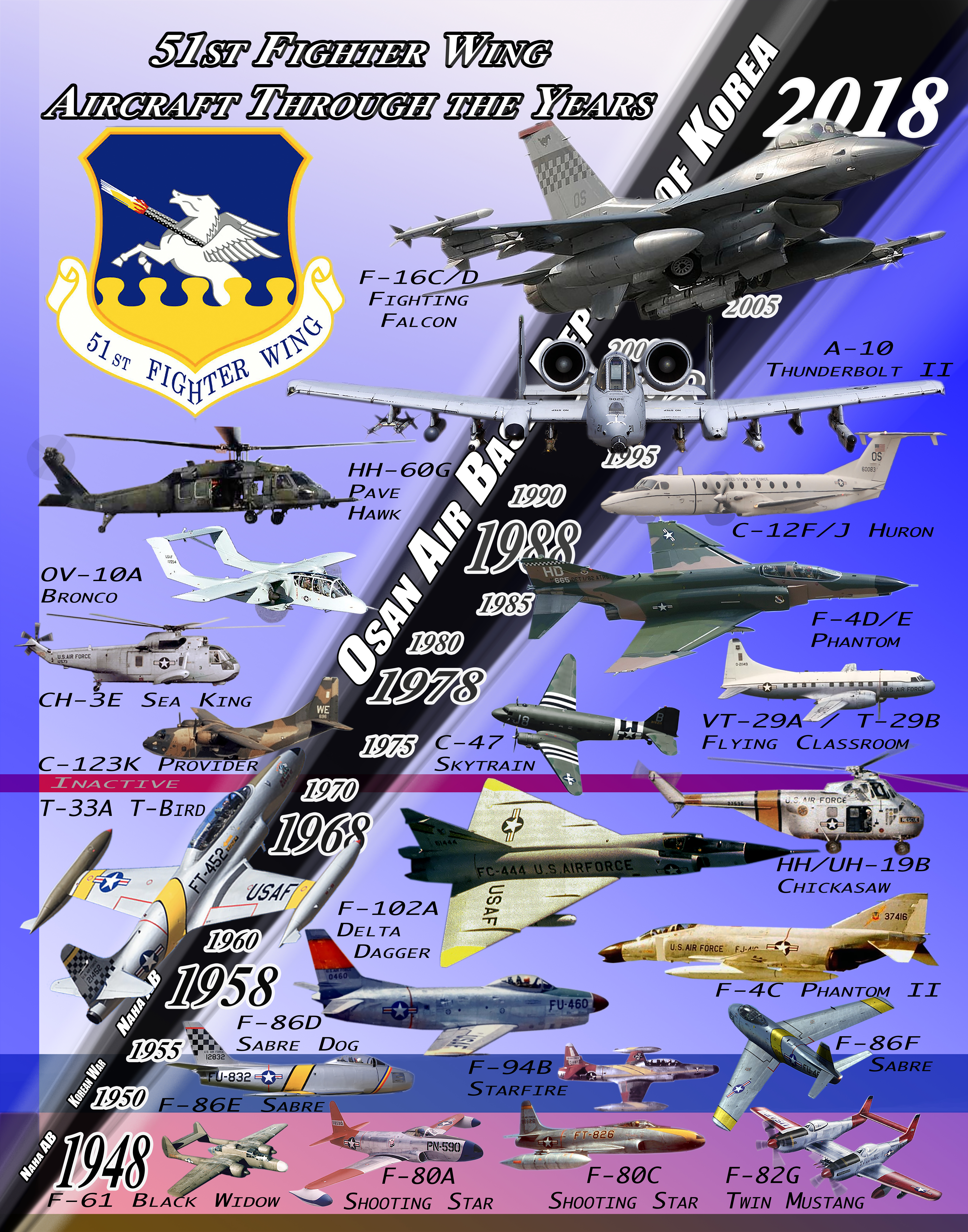
Historical Aircraft of the 51st Fighter Wing; Poster created by L. Vance Fleming, Historian for the 51st Fighter Wing. The photos used were from open-source sites. Not all aircraft were specifically assigned to the 51st Fighter Wing but are representative of the type of aircraft that were assigned.

- Naha Afld (later, Naha AB), Okinawa, 18 August 1948
- Itazuke AB, Japan, 22 September 1950
- Kimpo AB, South Korea, 10 October 1950
- Itazuke AB, Japan, 10 December 1950
- Tsuiki Air Base, Japan, 15 January 1951
- Suwon AB (K-13), South Korea, 1 October 1951 – 26 July 1954
- Naha AB, Okinawa, 1 August 1954 – 31 May 1971
- Osan AB, South Korea, 1 November 1971–present

=== Aircraft Assigned ===
The 51st FW's aircrews have flown a variety of aircraft, including the P/F-51 Mustang, F-80 Shooting Star, F-82 Twin Mustang, F-86 Sabrejet, F-94 Starfire, F-102A Delta Dagger, F-4E Phantom II, RF-4C Phantom II, F-106A Delta Dart, OV-10 Bronco, A-10 and OA-10 Thunderbolt II and several versions of the F-16 Fighting Falcon.

== Commanders ==
The list of commanders for the 51st Fighter Wing and its predecessors includes a wartime hero, Colonel Francis Gabreski, and an aviation pioneer, Tuskegee Airman Colonel Benjamin O. Davis Jr. This list includes those who only held command briefly as interim commanders.

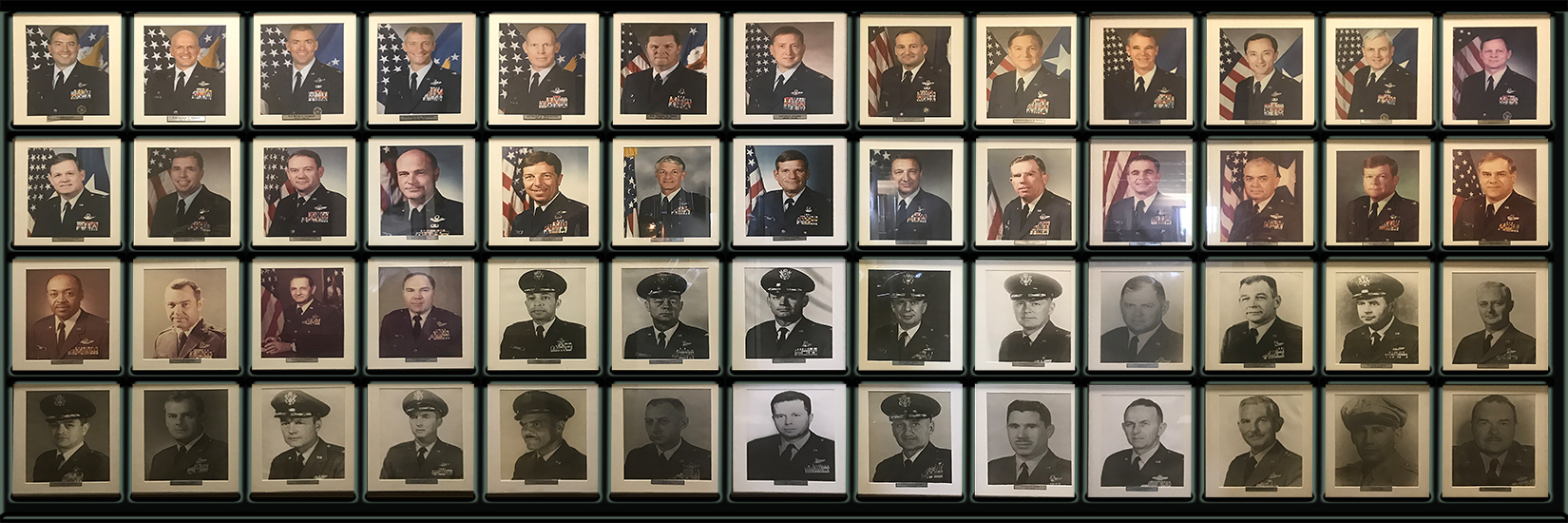
The Wall of Mustang 1s – Former Commanders of the 51st Fighter Wing, located in the wing headquarters at Osan Air Base, Republic of Korea.

Number	Command Rank	Name	Call Sign	Command Start	Command End	Notes:
1	Brig Gen	Hugo P. Rush	–	18 August 1948	24 March 1949	Commanded 301st Fighter Wing from April 1947; 51FIW activated at Naha Air Base, Okinawa
2	Col	John F. Egan	–	25 March 1949	31 March 1949	
3	Col	Richard M. Montgomery	–	1 April 1949	18 September 1949	
4	Col	John W. Weltman	–	19 September 1949	23 April 1951	Commanded 51FIW as it entered the Korean War (Japan / Korea / Japan / Korea)
5	Col	Oliver G. Cellini	–	24 April 1951	31 October 1951	
6	Col	William P. Litton	–	1 November 1951	2 November 1951	Crashed 2 November 1951, on mission, missing and presumed dead
7	Col	George R. Stanley	–	2 November 1951	5 November 1951	
8	Col	Francis S. Gabreski	–	6 November 1951	12 June 1952	Lead Ace of WWII – European Theater; Ace in Korean War with 6.5 Aerial Victories
9	Col	John W. Mitchell	–	13 June 1952	30 May 1953	"Robinson Crusoe of MiG Alley"
10	Col	William C. Clark	–	31 May 1953	8 August 1953	Commander when Korean War Armistice was signed
11	Col	Ernest H. Beverly	–	9 August 1953	10 September 1953	
12	Col	William C. Clark	–	11 September 1953	11 November 1953	
13	Col	Benjamin O. Davis Jr.	–	12 November 1953	1 July 1954	Former Commander of the Tuskegee Airman
14	Col	Barton M. Russell	–	2 July 1954	31 July 1954	Relinquished command in Korea as last units returned to Naha AB
15	Col	Travis Hoover	–	1 August 1954	8 August 1954	51FIW returns to Naha AB
16	Col	Hilmer C. Nelson	–	9 August 1954	15 August 1954	
17	Col	Edwin C. Ambrosen	–	16 August 1954	14 November 1955	
18	Col	John H. Bell	–	15 November 1955	1 February 1957	
19	Col	Paul E. Hoeper	–	2 February 1957	3 May 1957	
20	Col	Robert L. Cardenas	–	4 May 1957	14 July 1957	
21	Col	Walter V. Gresham Jr.	–	15 July 1957	31 July 1957	
22	Col	Elliott H. Reed	–	1 August 1957	14 August 1957	
23	Col	Walter V. Gresham Jr.	–	15 August 1957	21 November 1957	
24	Col	Lester J. Johnsen	–	22 November 1957	24 March 1960	
25	Col	William W. Ingenhutt	–	25 March 1960	23 July 1962	
26	Col	Lester C. Hess	–	24 July 1962	June 1965	
27	Col	Lloyd R. Larson	–	11 June 1965	7 April 1967	
28	Col	Frank E. Angier	–	8 April 1967	12 June 1968	
29	Col	John B. Weed	–	13 June 1968	29 June 1968	
30	Col	Roy D. Carlson	–	30 June 1968	31 May 1971	Wing inactivated at Naha AB.
31	Col	Hewitt E. Lovelace Jr.	–	1 November 1971	31 July 1972	Wing Reactivate at Osan Air Base.
32	Col	John H. Allison	–	1 August 1972	6 June 1973	
33	Col	Billie J. Norwood	–	7 June 1973	30 April 1974	
34	Col	Alonzo L. Ferguson	–	1 May 1974	29 September 1974	
35	Col	Glenn L. Nordin	–	30 September 1974	11 August 1975	
36	Col	Vernon H. Sandrock	–	12 August 1975	14 June 1977	
37	Col	Fred B. Hoenniger	–	15 June 1977	17 June 1979	
38	Col	James T. Boddie Jr.	–	18 June 1979	15 May 1980	
39	Col	John C. Scheidt Jr.	–	16 May 1980	19 February 1981	
40	Col	Eugene Myers	–	20 February 1981	15 July 1982	
41	Col	Thomas R. Olsen	–	16 July 1982	25 May 1983	
42	Col	Marcus F. Cooper Jr.	–	26 May 1983	17 October 1983	
43	Col	Barry J. Howard	–	18 October 1983	19 July 1984	
44	Col	Charles D. Link	–	20 July 1984	11 August 1985	
45	Col	Henry J. Cochran	–	12 August 1985	11 June 1987	
46	Col	John C. Marshall	–	12 June 1987	29 June 1989	
47	Col	James J. Winters	–	30 June 1989	16 July 1990	
48	Col	Thomas R. Case	–	17 July 1990	22 June 1992	
49	Brig Gen	Robert G. Jenkins	–	23 June 1992	30 January 1994	
50	Brig Gen	Robert H. Foglesong	–	31 January 1994	20 November 1995	
51	Brig Gen	Steven R. Polk	–	21 November 1995	14 May 1997	
52	Brig Gen	Paul R. Dordal	–	15 May 1997	14 September 1998	
53	Brig Gen	Robert R. Dierker	–	15 September 1998	21 May 2000	
54	Brig Gen	David E. Clary	–	22 May 2000	17 March 2002	
55	Brig Gen	William L. Holland	–	18 March 2002	28 September 2003	
56	Brig Gen	Maurice H. Forsyth	–	29 September 2003	7 July 2005	
57	Brig Gen	Joseph Reynes Jr.	–	8 July 2005	14 June 2007	
58	Col	Jon A. Norman	–	15 June 2007	14 October 2008	
59	Col	Thomas H. Deale	–	15 October 2008	6 December 2009	
60	Col	Patrick C. Malackowski	–	7 December 2009	14 July 2011	
61	Col	Patrick McKenzie	Smack	15 July 2011	12 July 2013	
62	Col	Brook J. Leonard	Tank	13 July 2013	15 June 2015	
63	Col	Andrew P. Hansen	Popeye	16 June 2015	26 June 2017	
64	Col	William D. Betts	Wilbur	27 June 2017	17 June 2019	
65	Col	John F. Gonzales	Gonzo	18 June 2019	25 June 2021	
66	Col	Joshua Wood	–	25 June 2021	20 June 2023	
67	Col	William McKibban	–	20 June 2023	27 June 2025	
68	Col	Ryan Ley	–	27 June 2025	Present	

== Notable members ==
- Buzz Aldrin, Served in the 16th Fighter Squadron during the Korean War; attained two aerial victories.
- Lt Col William A. Campbell, Commanded the 25FIS in 1954; served with the Tuskegee Airmen in WWII, flying 106 missions with one aerial victory.
- CMSAF James A. Cody, assigned to the 51st Operations Support Squadron from May 1993 – May 1994; became the 17th Chief Master Sergeant of the Air Force.
- Gen Benjamin O. Davis, Jr., former commander of the Tuskegee Airmen who became the wing commander and was promoted to General Officer (four-star) post-retirement.
- John Glenn, served as a branch exchange pilot from the USMC to the 25th Fighter Squadron, with three aerial victories in the Korean War.
- Chuck Norris, assigned to Osan security forces where he first started his martial arts practice.
- CMSAF Kaleth O. Wright. assigned to the 51st Dental Squadron from 1994 – 1995 and 2007 – 2009; became the 18th Chief Master Sergeant of the Air Force.
