= 51st Operations Group =

51st Operations Group

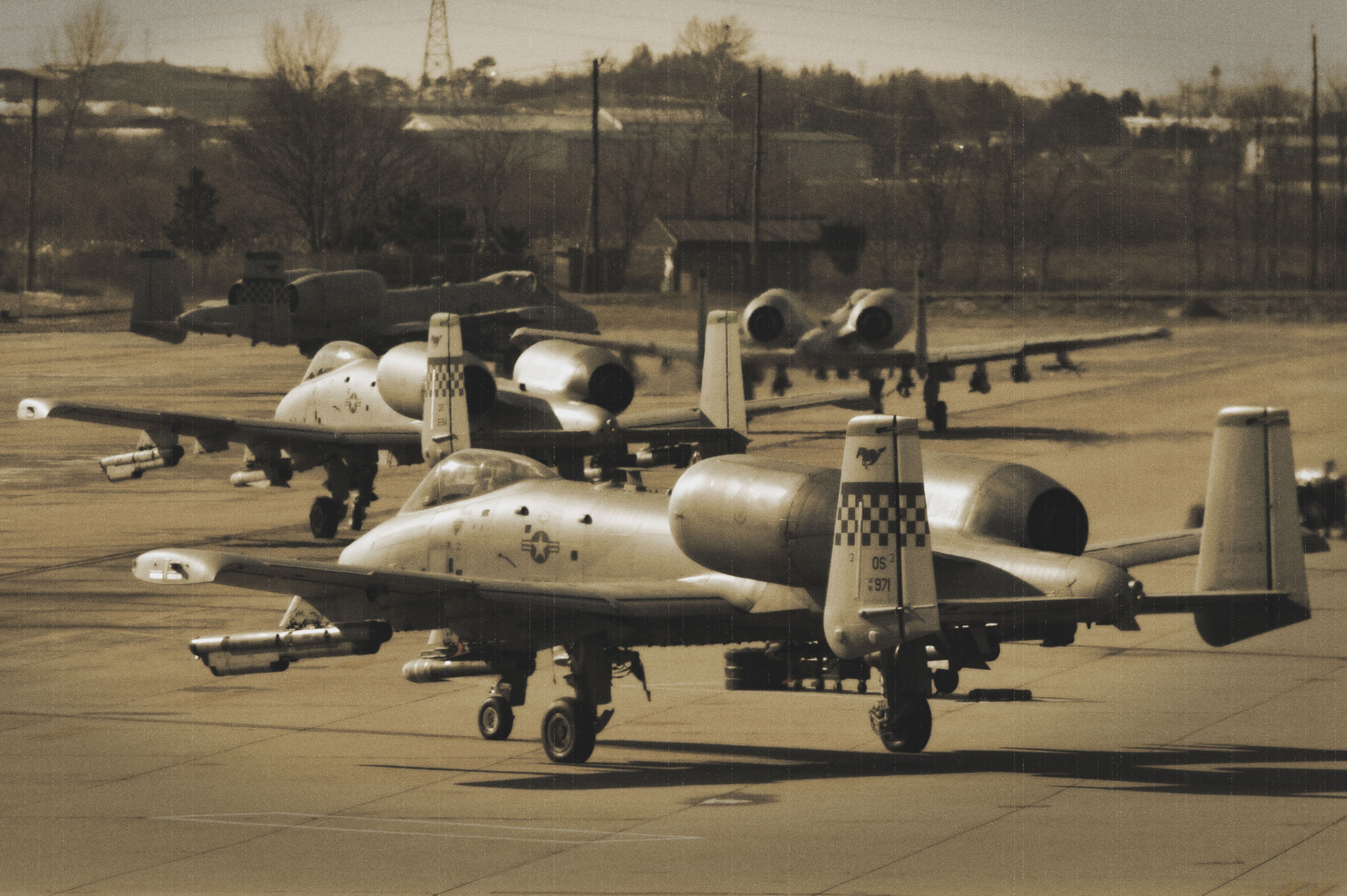
- A-10 Thunderbolt IIs taxi for a training mission at Osan AB
- Active: 1941–1945; 1946–1957; 1990 – present
- Country: United States
- Branch: United States Air Force
- Role: Fighter
- Part of: Pacific Air Forces
- Mottos: Deftly and Swiftly
- Engagements: Burma Campaign; Korean War
- Decorations: Distinguished Unit Citation; Air Force Outstanding Unit Award; Korean Presidential Unit Citation

Commanders
- Current commander: Colonel Kurt J. Distelzweig

Insignia
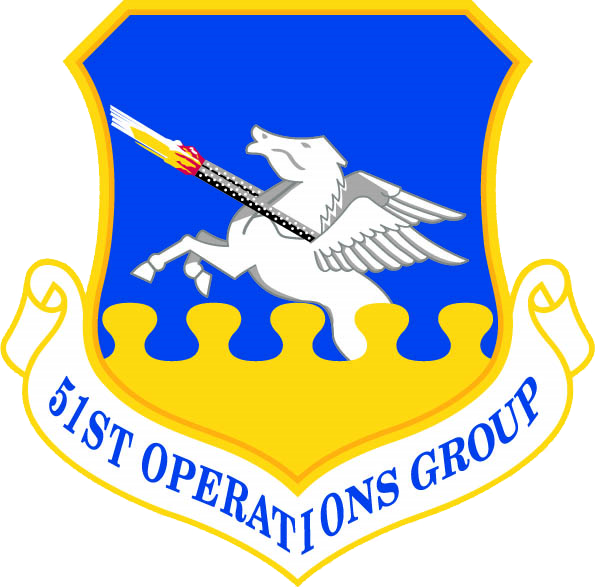
- 51st Operations Group emblem (Note: The group uses the 51st Fighter Wing emblem with the group designation on the scroll. Robertson, Factsheet 51 Operations Group.)

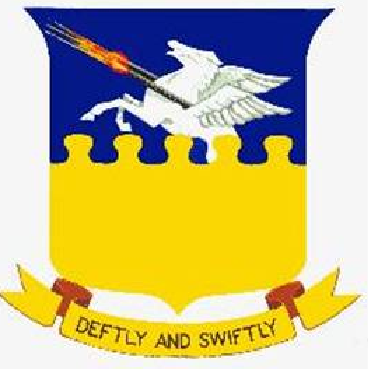
- 51st Fighter Group emblem (approved 5 February 1942)

The 51st Operations Group is the operational flying component of the United States Air Force 51st Fighter Wing, stationed at Osan Air Base, South Korea.

The group was first activated during the buildup for World War II as the 51st Pursuit Group. It was one of the first groups deployed from the United States after the Attack on Pearl Harbor, traveling west to India via Australia and Ceylon. It returned to the United States in December 1945 and inactivated. It was quickly reactivated on Okinawa and became part of the occupation forces. Later, during the Korean War, the group's aircraft were some of the first United States Air Force fighters to engage in combat operations over South Korea, frequently engaging enemy fighters in air-to-air combat.

== Overview ==
The 51st Operations Group is the most forward deployed USAF operations group in the world, providing combat ready aircraft for the close air support, air strike control, counter air, interdiction, theater airlift, and communications in the defense of the Republic of Korea.

== Assigned Units ==
The 51 Operation Group (Tail Code: OS) consists of the following squadrons:

- 25th Fighter Squadron "Assam Draggins" (A-10AC)
- 36th Fighter Squadron "Fiends" (Block 40 F-16C/D)
- 51st Operations Support Squadron (OSS)

== History ==
For additional history and lineage, see 51st Fighter Wing

=== World War II ===
During 1941, trained in the United States for fighter operations. After the Pearl Harbor attack on 7 December, the 51st served as part of the defense force for the west coast. Operational squadrons of the group were the 16th, 25th, 26th and 449th.

The group was deployed to India via Australia and Ceylon beginning in January 1942 and arriving in March, serving in the China Burma India Theater of World War II. It was assigned to Tenth Air Force and equipped with Curtiss P-40 Warhawks and Lockheed P-38 Lightnings. The group defended the Indian terminus of the "Hump" airlift route over the Himalaya Mountains between India and China and airfields in that area. The group flew strafing, bombing, reconnaissance, and patrol missions in support of Allied ground troops during a Japanese offensive in northern Burma in 1943.

After moving to China in October 1943 the 51st FG was assigned to the 69th Composite Wing of Fourteenth Air Force. The group defended the Chinese end of the Hump route and air bases in the Kunming area. Attacked Japanese shipping in the Red River delta of Indochina and supported Chinese ground forces in their late 1944 drive along the Salween River. The group was reequipped with North American P-51D Mustangs in 1945 to defend the eastern end of the route over the Hump, and to guard air bases in the Kunming area.

The 51st Fighter Group returned to India in the fall of 1945 and sailed for the United States in November. The group was inactivated on 13 December 1945.

The group was reactivated at Yontan Air Base Okinawa in 1946 and moved to Naha AB when Yontan closed in 1947. The group was assigned to the Twentieth Air Force, 301st Fighter Wing. The group served as part of the occupation force and provided air defense for Okinawa and the Ryukyu Islands until 1950.

=== Korean War ===
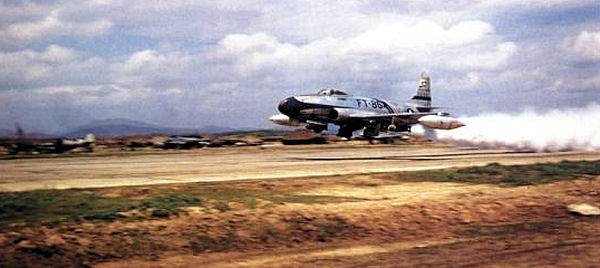
F-80C of the 51st Fighter-Bomber Wing taking off from Suwon AB with a JATO bottle

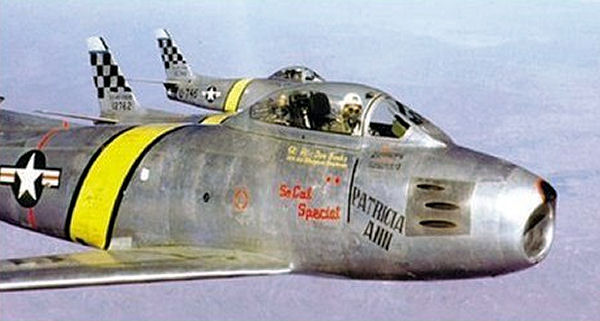
North American F-86E-10-NA Sabres of the 25th Fighter-Interceptor Squadron (51st) FBG over Korea. Identifiable is serial is 51–2742.

With the outbreak of the Korean War in 1950, elements of the 51st were dispatched first to Japan, then to South Korea. It entered combat service flying the Lockheed F-80C Shooting Star on 22 September of that year, when it moved to Itazuke Air Base, Japan to support the breakout of the U.S. Eighth Army from the Pusan Perimeter. For nearly 4 years thereafter, the 51st FIW played a key role in the defense of South Korea despite moving to four different locations within a year and operating under austere conditions.

The wing moved to South Korea in October only to return to Japan in December, leaving combat elements behind. In May 1951, the 51st FIW moved to Suwon Air Base, southwest of Seoul, but retained maintenance and supply elements at Tsuiki Air Base, Japan, to provide rear echelon support. In November 1951 the 51st FIW transitioned to the North American F-86 Sabre with two squadrons (16th, 25th), adding a third squadron (26th) the following May.

The group operated a detachment at Suwon AB, Korea, beginning in May 1951, and relocated there in October 1951, with maintenance and supply elements remaining in Japan until August 1954. The wing ceased combat on 27 July 1953. The 51 FIW's war record was impressive. Wing pilots flew more than 45,000 sorties and shot down 312 MiG-15s; this produced 14 air aces including the top ace of the war, Captain Joseph C. McConnell. The ratio of aerial victories to losses was 10 to 1. Unfortunately, the wing lost 32 pilots to enemy action; however, nine that became prisoners of war were repatriated later.

=== Cold War ===
On 1 August 1954, the 51 FIW returned to Naha Air Base to resume air defense coverage of the Ryukyu Islands. Operational squadrons were the 16th, 25th 26th FISs. At the same time, the wing demonstrated its mobility readiness in response to three regional crises. During the period when the 51st was stationed at Naha, Okinawa, it was called upon to fly cover for the National Chinese who were evacuating the mainland. The 25th went to Formosa and flew out of China in the central part of the island and provided assistance to the Seventh Fleet as well as flying recon flights over the mainland of China.

The group was inactivated on 25 October 1957 when the group's parent wing adapted the Tri-Deputate organization and the operational fighter squadrons were assigned directly to the wing.

=== Return to Korea ===
Since 1990, trained and took part in a series of exercises to maintain combat readiness for the air defense of South Korea.

== Lineage ==
- Established as the 51st Pursuit Group (Interceptor) on 20 November 1940

Activated on 15 January 1941
Redesignated 51st Pursuit Group (Fighter) on 12 March 1941
Redesignated 51st Fighter Group on 15 May 1942
Inactivated on 13 December 1945

- Activated on 15 October 1946

Redesignated 51st Fighter-Interceptor Group on 1 February 1950
Inactivated on 25 October 1957

- Redesignated 51st Tactical Fighter Group on 31 July 1985 (Remained inactive)
- Redesignated: 51st Fighter Group on 10 September 1990

Activated on 1 October 1990
Redesignated 51st Operations Group on 7 February 1992

=== Assignments ===
- Southwest Air District (later 4th Air Force), 15 January 1941
- 9th Pursuit Wing, 2 June 1941 (attached to 4th Air Force until 20 June 1941)
- IV Bomber Command, 19 September 1941 – January 1942 (attached to IV Interceptor Command, 14 October 1941-unknown)
- 10th Air Force (later Tenth) Air Force), c. 14 March 1942
- Fourteenth Air Force, 12 September 1943 (attached to Tenth Air Force until 1 October 1943)
- 69th Bombardment Wing (later 69 Composite Wing), October 1943
- Fourteenth Air Force, 25 August 1945
- Army Air Forces, India-Burma Theater, September–November 1945
- 301st Fighter Wing, 15 October 1946
- 51st Fighter Wing (later 51st Fighter-Interceptor Wing), 18 August 1948 – 25 October 1957 (attached to 8th Fighter-Bomber Wing 26 September-12 October 1950, Detachment 1, Twentieth Air Force 16 August 1954 – 1 March 1955, Detachment 1, 313th Air Division, 1–15 March 1955)
- 51st Tactical Fighter Wing (later 51st Wing, 51 Fighter Wing), 1 October 1990 – present

=== Components ===
- 4th Fighter Squadron: attached 20 February 1947 – 20 September 1950
- 16th Pursuit Squadron (later 16th Fighter Squadron, 16th Fighter-Interceptor Squadron): 15 January 1941 – 7 December 1945 (detached July 1942-19 October 1943); 15 October 1946 – 15 October 1957 (detached 3–28 April 1955, 1 June – 1 July 1955, and 1 July-25 October 1957).
- 19th Tactical Air Support Squadron: 1 October 1990 – 1 October 1993
- 25th Pursuit Squadron (later 25th Fighter Squadron, 25th Fighter-Interceptor Squadron, 25th Fighter Squadron): 15 January 1941 – 12 December 1945; 15 October 1946 – 25 October 1957 (detached 28 April – 1 June 1955 and 1 July-25 October 1957); 1 October 1993–present
- 26th Pursuit Squadron (later 26th Fighter Squadron, 26th Fighter-Interceptor Squadron): 15 January 1941 – 13 December 1945; 15 October 1946 – 1 October 1957 (detached 20 September 1950 – 31 July 1954, 10 November-11 December 1954, and 11 July 1955 – 1 October 1957)
- 36th Tactical Fighter Squadron (later 36th Fighter Squadron): 1 October 1990–present
- 38th Rescue Squadron (later 38 Rescue Flight): 1 February 1993 – 15 February 1996.
- 39th Fighter-Interceptor Squadron: attached 1 June 1952 – 14 July 1954.
- 68th Fighter-All Weather Squadron: attached 25 September-9 October 1950
- 80th Fighter-Bomber Squadron: attached 25 September-20 December 1950
- 449th Fighter Squadron: 26 August 1943 – 13 December 1945 (detached 26 August-19 October 1943)

=== Stations ===
- Hamilton Field, California, 15 January 1941
- March Field, California, 20 June 1941 – 11 January 1942
- Karachi Airport, India, 14 March 1942
- Dinjan Airfield, India, 10 October 1942
- Kunming Airport, China, 2 October 1943
- India (Undetermined location), September-16 November 1945
- Fort Lewis, Washington, 12–13 December 1945
- Yontan Airfield, Okinawa, 15 October 1946
- Naha Airfield (later Naha Air Base), Okinawa, 22 May 1947
- Itazuke Air Base, Japan, 22 September 1950
- Kimpo Air Base, South Korea, 24 October 1950
- Itazuke Air Base, Japan, 3 January 1951
- Tsuiki Air Base, Japan, 22 January 1951
- Suwon Air Base, South Korea, 31 July 1951
- Naha Air Base, Okinawa, 1 August 1954 – 25 October 1957
- Osan Air Base, South Korea, 1 October 1990–present

=== Aircraft ===
- Curtiss P-40 Warhawk, 1941–1945
- Lockheed P-38 Lightning, 1943–1945
- North American P-51 Mustang, 1944–1945
- Republic P-47 Thunderbolt, 1946–1947
- Lockheed F-80 Shooting Star, 1947–1951
- Northrop F-61 Black Widow, 1947–1950
- North American F-82 Twin Mustang, 1949–1950
- North American F-86 Sabre, 1951–1957
- Lockheed F-94 Starfire, 1954
- General Dynamics F-16 Fighting Falcon, 1990 – present
- Fairchild Republic OA-10 Thunderbolt II, 1990 – present
- Beechcraft C-12 Huron, 1992–2007
- Sikorsky HH-60 Pave Hawk, 1993–1995
- Fairchild Republic A-10 Thunderbolt II, 1998 – present
