= Thomas Olsen =

Thomas Olsen may refer to:

- Thomas Olsen (soccer) (born 1995), American soccer player
- Thomas David Lukas Olsen (born 1975), German murderer
- Thomas Lehne Olsen (born 1991), Norwegian footballer
- Thomas Fredrik Olsen (1897–1969), Norwegian ship-owner
- Thomas R. Olsen (1934–2014), United States Air Force general
- Thomas Valkvæ Olsen (born 1993), Norwegian ice hockey player
- Tom Strømstad Olsen (born 1971), Norwegian politician
- Tommy Olsen (born 1973), Danish football manager and former player
- Tommy Olsen (orienteer), Norwegian ski-orienteering competitor
- Thomas Kjær Olsen (born 1997), Danish motocross rider
