= George L. Jones =

American flying ace

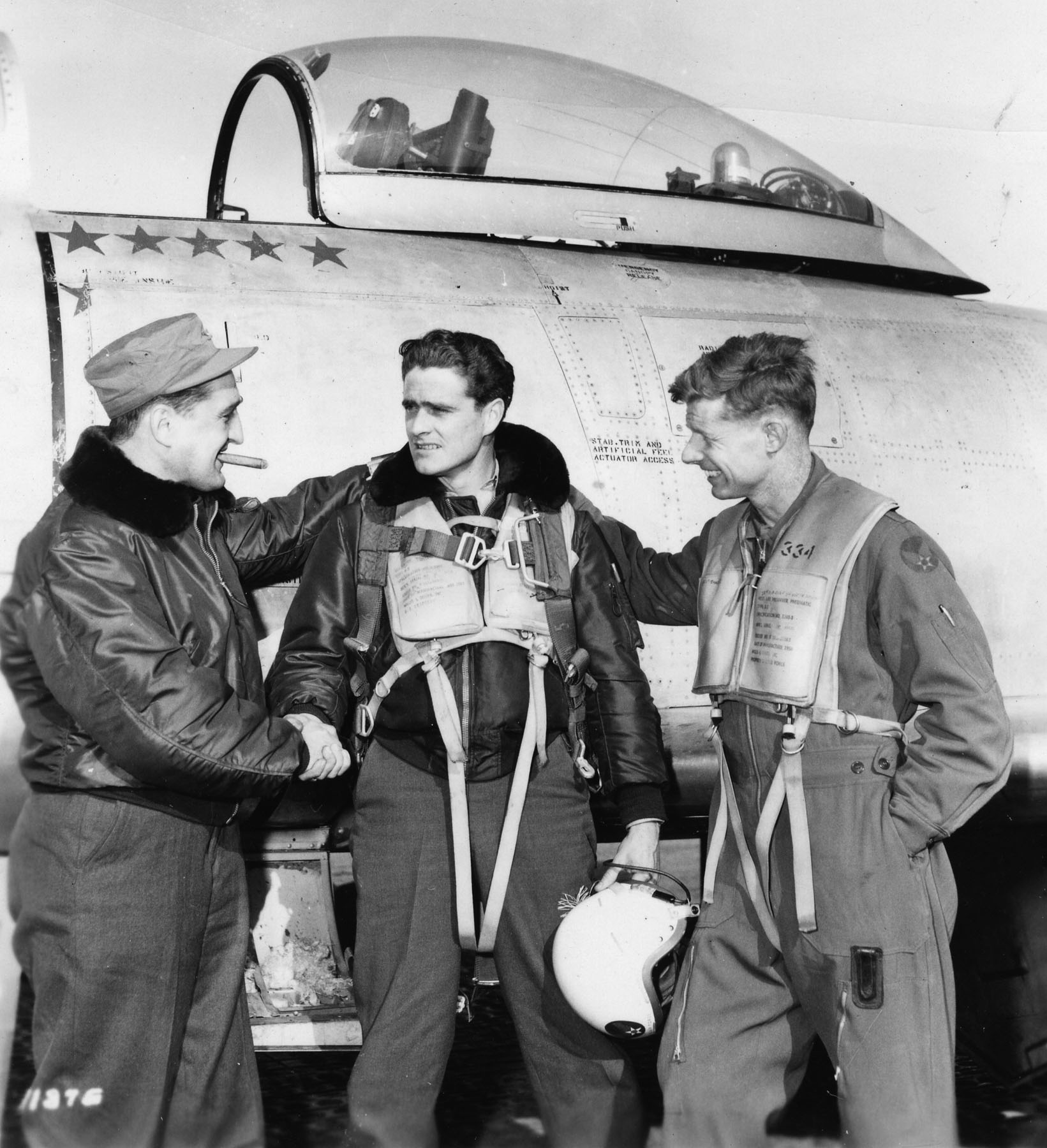
- Lieutenant Colonel George L. Jones (right) with fellow aces Gabby Gabreski (left) and William T. Whisner Jr. in Korea, 1950
- Born: May 12, 1918; New York City
- Died: February 18, 1997 (aged 78)
- Military career
- Allegiance: United States
- Branch: United States Army Air Forces; United States Army
- Rank: Colonel
- Conflicts: Korean War
- Awards: Silver Star; Legion of Merit; Distinguished Flying Cross (3)

George Lamar Jones (12 May 1918 – 18 February 1997) was a United States Air Force flying ace during the Korean War, shooting down six enemy aircraft, with an additional shared victory credit, for a total of 6.5 victories in the war.

== Early life and military career ==
George L. Jones was born on May 12, 1918, in New York, New York, and moved to Titusville, Florida, during his youth. After completing college, he became a U.S. Army Lieutenant serving in the 22nd Infantry Regiment of the 4th Infantry Division. In 1941, he was assigned to the 97th Observation Squadron, and served in various stateside posts during WWII flying anti-submarine missions. In 1945, he was attached to the 21st Fighter Squadron and later the 34th Fighter Squadron where he was a flight leader on fighter aircraft missions during the Battle of Okinawa. During the Korean War, as a Lt. Col., he became America's 30th Jet Ace for downing 6.5 enemy MiG's.

== Awards ==
Jones was awarded the Silver Star, the Legion of Merit, and two Distinguished Flying Crosses.

== See also ==
- List of Korean War flying aces
