= 348th Tactical Electronics Group =

Inactive United States Air Force unit

9th Fighter Wing (later 348th Tactical Electronics Group
- Active: 1940–1943
- Country: United States
- Branch: United States Air Force
- Role: Electronics

The 348th Tactical Electronics Group is an inactive United States Air Force unit. The unit was active as the 9th Pursuit Wing and the 9th Fighter Wing during World War II. Although based at RAF Station Kabrit in Egypt assigned to the Ninth Air Force it had no component units and was inactivated on 31 March 1943.

It was redesignated to its current name in 1985.

== History ==
Assigned to Fourth Air Force as prewar Pursuit Wing. The 9th Pursuit Wing was activated on 18 December 1940. In the period until it was inactivated on 1 October 1941, its only component groups were the 14th Fighter Group (10 June- 5 September 1941) and the 51st Fighter Group (20 June–19 September 1941). The latter had been attached to 4th Air Force) until 20 June 1941. The wing was based at March Field, California.

The wing was reactivated on 24 July 1942 as the 9th Fighter Wing at Drew Field, Florida where it stayed until 13 December 1942 when it moved to Egypt in 1942. The wing was based at RAF Kabrit, Egypt from 1 February. However all Ninth Air Force fighter groups in the eastern desert were detached to the Royal Air Force and none were assigned to a USAAF wing. The wing was inactivated on 31 March 1943 but not formally disbanded until 15 June 1983.

The wing was reconstituted and redesignated as the 348th Tactical Electronics Group on 31 July 1985 (not active).

== Lineage ==
- Constituted as the 9th Pursuit Wing on 19 October 1940

Activated on 18 December 1940
Inactivated on 1 October 1941

- Redesignated 9th Fighter Wing and activated on 24 July 1942

Inactivated on 31 March 1943

- Disbanded on 15 June 1983
- Reconstituted and redesignated 348th Tactical Electronics Group on 31 July 1985 (not active)

=== Assignments ===
- Southwest Air District (later 4th Air Force), 18 December 1940 – 1 October 1941
- Ninth Air Force, 24 July 1942 – 31 March 1943

=== Stations ===
- March Field, California, 18 December 1940—1 October 1941
- Drew Field, Florida, 24 July – 13 December 1942
- RAF Kabrit, Egypt, 1 February – 31 March 1943

=== Components ===
- 14th Fighter Group, 10 June- 5 September 1941
- 51st Fighter Group, 20 June–19 September 1941 (attached to 4th Air Force) until 20 June 1941)
