= William T. Whisner Jr. =

U.S. Air Force officer (1923–1989)

William Thomas Whisner Jr.
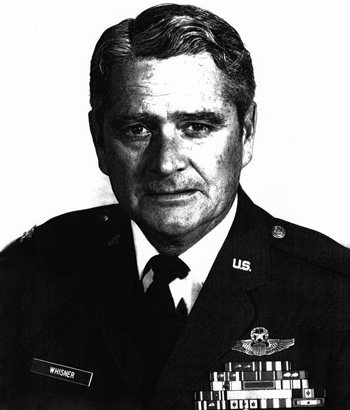
- Colonel William T. Whisner Jr. in 1971
- Born: October 17, 1923; Shreveport, Louisiana, U.S.
- Died: July 21, 1989 (aged 65); Alexandria, Louisiana, U.S.
- Military career
- Allegiance: United States
- Branch: United States Air Force
- Service years: 1942–1972
- Rank: Colonel
- Nickname: "Bill"
- Units: 352nd Fighter Group; 4th Fighter-Interceptor Wing; 51st Fighter Interceptor Wing
- Commands: 494th Tactical Fighter Squadron; 4517th Combat Crew Training Squadron; 48th Tactical Fighter Wing
- Conflicts: World War II; Korean War; Vietnam War
- Awards: Distinguished Service Cross (3); Silver Star; Distinguished Flying Cross (7); Bronze Star Medal; Air Medal (11)

William Thomas Whisner Jr. (October 17, 1923 – July 21, 1989) was a career officer and pilot in the United States Air Force, retiring as a colonel with 30 years of military service. He was a fighter ace with Army Air Forces over Europe in World War II and a jet fighter ace with the Air Force in the Korean War.

Although best known for his credited destruction of 22½ aircraft in aerial combat and being one of only seven U.S. combat pilots to become an ace in two wars, Whisner commanded the 48th Tactical Fighter Wing, before retiring in 1972.

== Early life ==
William T. Whisner Jr. was born in Shreveport, Louisiana, on October 17, 1923, to William Whisner, Sr. and Eloise Bickham Whisner. In his youth, Whisner was an active member of the local Boy Scouts of America, eventually attaining the rank of Eagle Scout in that program.

Growing up in Shreveport, Whisner attended C. E. Byrd High School, becoming active in the school's Junior Reserve Officers' Training Corps. It was during this involvement that Whisner developed an interest in becoming a military aviator.

== Military career ==
Immediately upon graduating from high school, Whisner applied for the United States Army Air Forces cadet program, being accepted and began his training on 8 April 1942. Whisner first began Primary Flight Training at the Lafayette Municipal Airport in Lafayette, Louisiana, getting his first flight time aboard PT-17 and PT-19 trainer aircraft. Following the successful completion of this training, he underwent Basic Combat Training at Greenville Army Airfield in Greenville, Mississippi. After this training, Whisner attended Advanced Flight Training at Napier Field, Alabama flying the AT-6 Texan. Whisner completed his training on 16 February 1943 and was commissioned a second lieutenant in the United States Army.

Whisner's first assignment in the Air Corps was sent to Westover Field in Springfield, Massachusetts, for operational training, where he learned to fly the P-47 Thunderbolt fighter aircraft. With this training complete, he was assighed to the 34th Fighter Squadron at LaGuardia Field in New York City, New York. The squadron was in the process of training for deployment in support of World War II. The unit was later redesignated the 487th Fighter Squadron, 352nd Fighter Group.

=== World War II ===
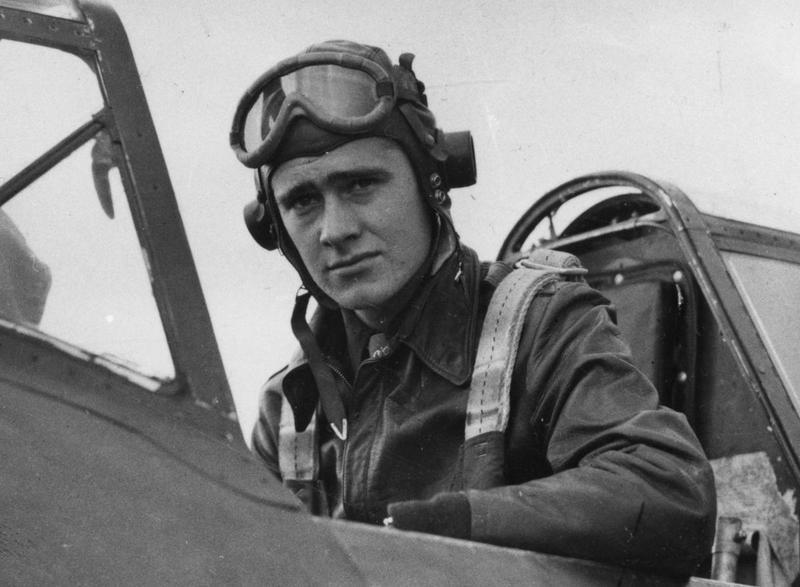
Whisner in his P-47 Thunderbolt

With the unit's training completed, the 352nd Fighter Group boarded the troopship RMS Queen Elizabeth in June 1943. The group landed in the United Kingdom, and was assigned to RAF Bodney in Watton, Norfolk, under the operational control of the 67th Fighter Wing, VIII Fighter Command. Throughout the summer, Whisner and his fellow aviators were occupied in training flights over England, where they acclimated to flying in unfamiliar weather. This training was completed on 9 September 1943 and the group flew its first combat mission on that date.

From September 1943 through January 1944, Whisner and the group saw limited success, as the P-47s were limited in range and few Luftwaffe patrols of Nazi German pilots appeared over Norfolk. In its first four months of short-range patrols, the 352nd Fighter Group had 23 confirmed victories, two probable victories, and two German aircraft damaged.

==== First tour ====
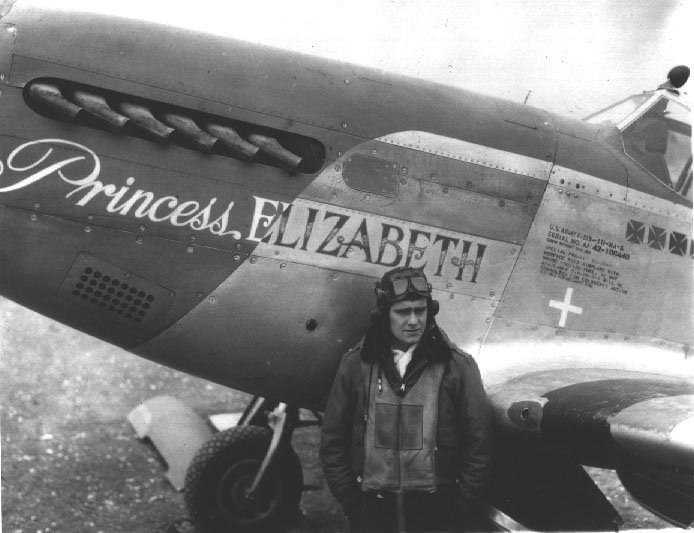
Whisner with his P-51B Mustang 'Princess Elizabeth'

In late January 1944, the US Army Air Corps adapted a new strategy for P-47s to escort bombing runs as they returned from their missions. The first attempted mission, on 24 January, was disrupted by bad weather. On 29 January, 13 P-47 Thunderbolt and P-51 Mustang fighter groups escorted a bombing mission of B-17 Flying Fortresses to Frankfurt, Germany, and Whisner was among the pilots in the group. German aircraft launched heavy resistance against the bombing, and it would be the first time he could engage enemy aircraft. Whisner and the 352nd Fighter Group joined the mission over Namur, Belgium, as the bomber group was already under attack. Whisner, who was the wingman of Captain George Preddy, joined the chaotic battle, and within 10 minutes Whisner spotted two Focke-Wulf Fw 190 fighters which had just shot down a B-17. Whisner pursued one of the Fw 190s down to 1,000 feet (300 m), pursuing it closely as it attempted evasive maneuvers. As the Fw 190 attempted to dive behind a bank of clouds, Whisner struck it with three bursts from his machine gun, and it descended to 800 feet (240 m) before its pilot bailed out. By the end of the day, The American pilots claimed 47 German aircraft destroyed and 5 probables, losing 14 of their own.

By March 1944, the 352nd Fighter Group had 63 victories to its pilots, but senior leaders felt it was under-performing, so the group was equipped with P-51 Mustangs. It was customary for pilots to nickname and decorate their own aircraft, but a command decision compelled Whisner to name his aircraft "Princess Elizabeth" in honor of an anticipated visit by Elizabeth II. Over the next month, the squadron saw much greater success, and Whisner was among the pilots to benefit. On 9 April, Whisner and Preddy were on an escort mission over Belgium when they spotted an airfield which the flight attacked. In five passes, Whisner destroyed two Junkers Ju 88 dive bombers and damaged a nearby barracks. The group eventually claimed 12 aircraft destroyed and one probable in the attack. On 30 April, during an attack on an airfield in Clermont-Ferrand, France, Whisner shot down an Fw 190 which was attempting to attack the bombers. The 352nd ended the month with 107 victories and 4 probables, and 62 aircraft damaged.

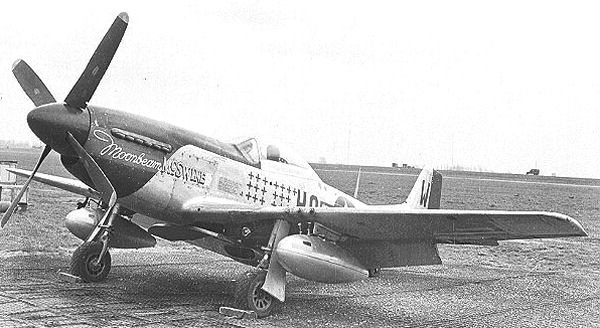
Whisner's P-51D

In May, Whisner and the group continued aggressive bombing missions, and while he was unable to get any aerial victories, he was credited with destroying several ground targets. On 10 May, Whisner was a part of an attack on an airfield in Frankenhausen, Germany when he destroyed a Junkers Ju 87 Stuka on the ground. During another mission 24 May, Whisner was credited with destroying seven locomotives and damaging three others during an attack on a German railyard, as well as destroying a railroad station, a tugboat, and a gun emplacement. On 29 May the group escorted a flight of B-24 Liberators over Güstrow, Germany when they were met by 40 German fighters. Whisner engaged an Fw 190 at 26,000 feet (7,900 m). The pilot was extremely skilled, but Whisner managed to strike the Fw 190 with six bursts of machine gun fire, destroying the aircraft. The next day, on a mission against a fuel depot and aircraft production complex in Magdeburg, Germany, and during the subsequent heavy engagement, Whisner and Preddy shared a victory, making Whisner's total victory count 6.5, including ground kills.

In June, Whisner flew missions in support of the allied invasion of Normandy. For the first week of the month the group supported attacks to soften German defenses in France and Belgium. Following Operation Overlord, Whisner conducted bombing and strafing missions in close air support of ground forces. Flying multiple missions a day, Whisner assisted in the destruction of a convoy on 7 June, with 15 vehicles credited to him. On 13 June, Whisner was given three months shore leave in the United States, having completed his first tour of duty.

==== Second tour ====
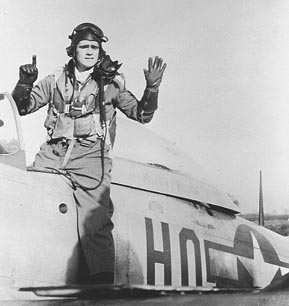
Whisner poses after scoring 4 kills and 2 probables on November 21, 1944.

Whisner returned to England in late September. By this time, however, the Luftwaffe had taken heavy losses and was opposing allied pilots far less often. Whisner flew his first combat mission on 28 September, shortly after being promoted to Captain. The 352nd Group was not credited with destroying any aircraft until 1 November. Whisner, now a captain, rejoined the 487th Squadron in the fall of 1944. On Nov. 2, he downed a Bf 109 using the new K-14 gunsight. On Nov. 21 he led a flight of P-51s on an escort mission to Merseburg, Germany. As the bombers left their target, a large formation of enemy fighters struck. In a linked series of attacks, Whisner shot down four Fw 190s in the cover flight and probably got another.

With no more than two Fw 190s left in the cover flight he had attacked, Whisner turned his attention to the main enemy formation, shooting a Fw 190 that had not dropped its drop tank. Evading three Fw 190s on his tail, he shot down another that was closing on one of his pilots. Then, low on ammunition, he joined up with his flight and returned to Bodney. Whisner was credited with five Fw 190s and two probables that day.

His score later was revised by the Air Force Historical Research Agency to six destroyed, making that day one of the best for any USAAF pilot in the skies over Europe. For that achievement, Whisner was awarded his first Distinguished Service Cross—second only to the Medal of Honor. Whisner was finally certified a flying ace, bringing his total to 10 air-to-air kills.

==== Battle of Y-29 ====
During the Battle of the Bulge, which started on December 16, the 487th Fighter Squadron was moved forward to airfield Y-29 near Asch, Belgium.

On New Year's Day 1945, Whisner was one of 12 Mustang pilots led by Meyer that had started their takeoff roll when a large formation of Fw 190s and Bf 109s hit the field. In the ensuing battle, fought at low altitude and before the 487th Fighter Squadron pilots had time to form up, Whisner shot down a Fw 190, then was hit by 20 mm fire.

With his windshield and canopy covered by oil and one aileron damaged, Whisner stayed in the fight, shooting down one more Fw 190 and two Bf 109s. He was awarded a second Distinguished Service Cross for that day's work—one of only 14 USAAF men to be so honored in World War II. (Note: Meyer received his third Distinguished Service Cross on the same mission, the only Air Force pilot to receive three DSCs in World War II) At the end of the war, Whisner had flown 127 missions and logged 450 combat hours. He was credited with 16.4 aerial victories, which put him in the top 20 USAAF aces of the European Theater.

=== USAF career ===
After World War II, Whisner left active duty and served in the reserves from August 24, 1945, to August 31, 1946. He then went back on active duty and served with the 56th Fighter Group at Selfridge Field from September 1946 to April 1947, and then with the 334th Fighter Squadron of the 4th Fighter Group at Andrews Field from April to September 1947. He then served for a short time at Bolling Air Force Base and then with the 61st Fighter Interceptor Squadron of the 56th Fighter Interceptor Group at Selfridge Air Force Base.

=== Korean War ===
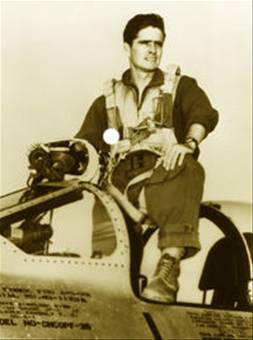
Whisner in Korea

In September 1951, Whisner deployed with the 334th Fighter Interceptor Squadron of the 4th Fighter Interceptor Wing to Korea, where he destroyed two MiG-15s in aerial combat and damaged four others, before joining the 25th Fighter Interceptor Squadron of the 51st Fighter Interceptor Wing in November 1951. He then destroyed another 4.5 MiG-15s with 2 more damaged, with total 6 enemy aircraft destroyed in Korea.

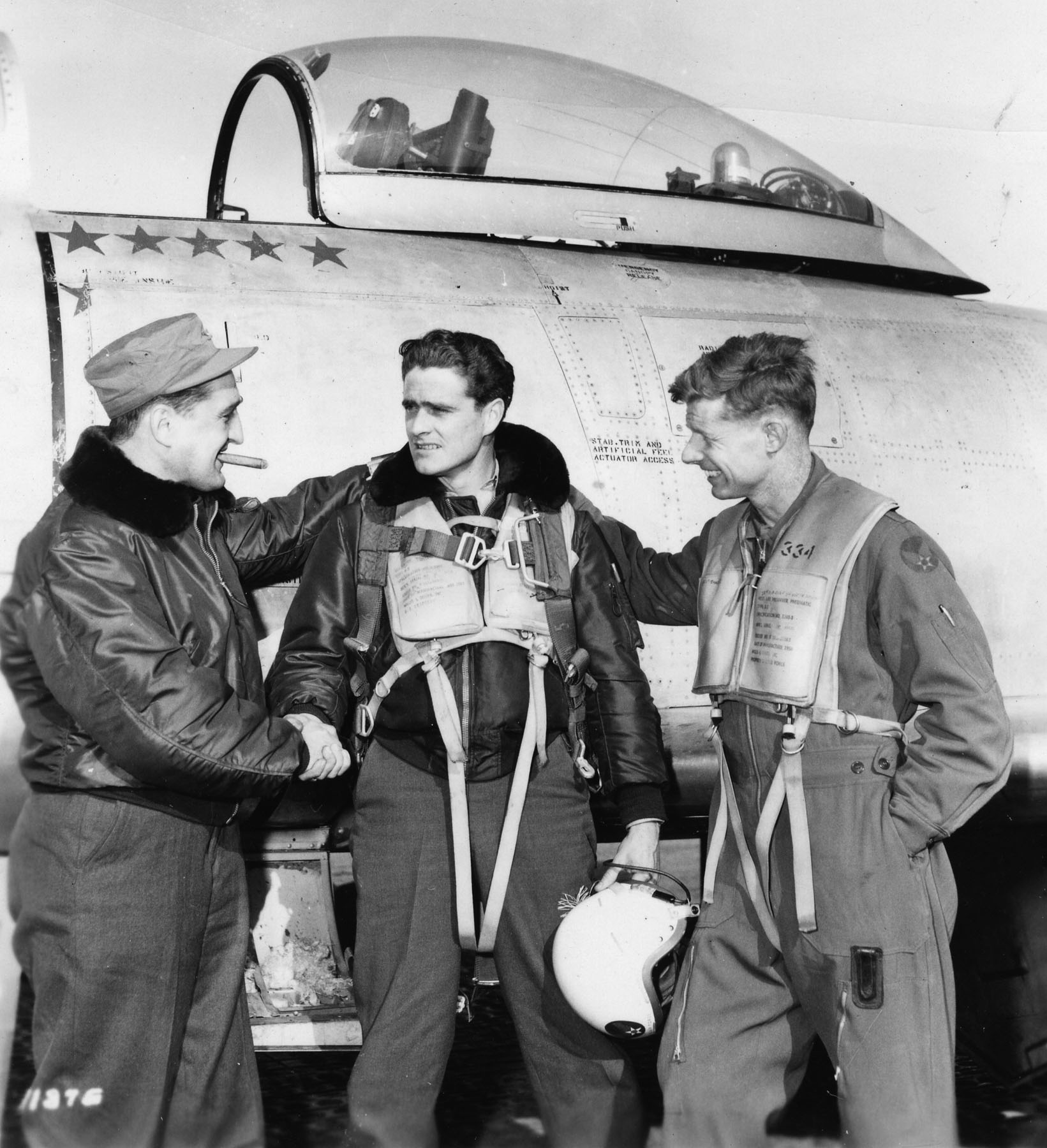
Whisner (center) is congratulated by Gabby Gabreski (left) and Lt. Col. George L. Jones (right).

During his time in Korea, he served under the command of ETO's leading ace, Gabby Gabreski. Gabreski was an aggressive commander and fostered a fierce rivalry between the 51st Fighter Interceptor Wing and 4th Fighter Interceptor Wing, both F-86 Sabre wings, fueled in part by the fact that the 4th had also been the keenest rival of the 56th Fighter Group during World War II. Gabreski and a fellow former 56th Fighter Group pilot, Colonel Walker M. Mahurin and Whisner planned and executed a mission in early 1952 in which the F-86s turned off their IFF equipment and overflew two Chinese bases. These missions were known as clandestine 'Maple Special' missions. Gabreski brought with him from the 56th Fighter Interceptor Wing in June 1951.

Before the mission of February 20, 1952, Gabreski and Whisner each had four MiGs credited as destroyed. During the mission, Gabreski attacked and severely damaged a MiG 15 that fled across the Yalu River into China. He broke off the engagement and returned to base after his own airplane was damaged, where he claimed the MiG as a "probable kill". Whisner trailed the MiG deep into Manchuria trying to confirm Gabreski's kill, but his Sabre ran low on fuel. He completed the shootdown and returned to K-14 where he confirmed the kill for Gabreski but did not claim it himself. Gabreski confronted him and angrily ordered him to change his mission report, confirming Whisner's own role in the kill. Whisner refused. Soon after, Gabreski recanted his anger and the two shared the claim, as a consequence of which three days later Whisner and not Gabreski became the first pilot of the 51st FW to reach jet ace status.

As a result, Whisner was awarded his third Distinguished Service Cross for being the first ace of the 51st Fighter Interceptor Wing. He is also one of the two airmen to receive the Distinguished Service Cross three times. (Note: Other being his former World War II fighter squadron commander, John C. Meyer)

For a two-war total of 22 destroyed in the air, 1 probable, 6 damaged, and 3 destroyed on the ground, made him one of only 7 people to have been an ace in both World War II and the Korean War. The others, George Andrew Davis Jr., Gabby Gabreski, Vermont Garrison, Harrison Thyng, and James P. Hagerstrom, are all Air Force pilots, as well as John F. Bolt of the U.S. Marine Corps.

=== Post-war ===
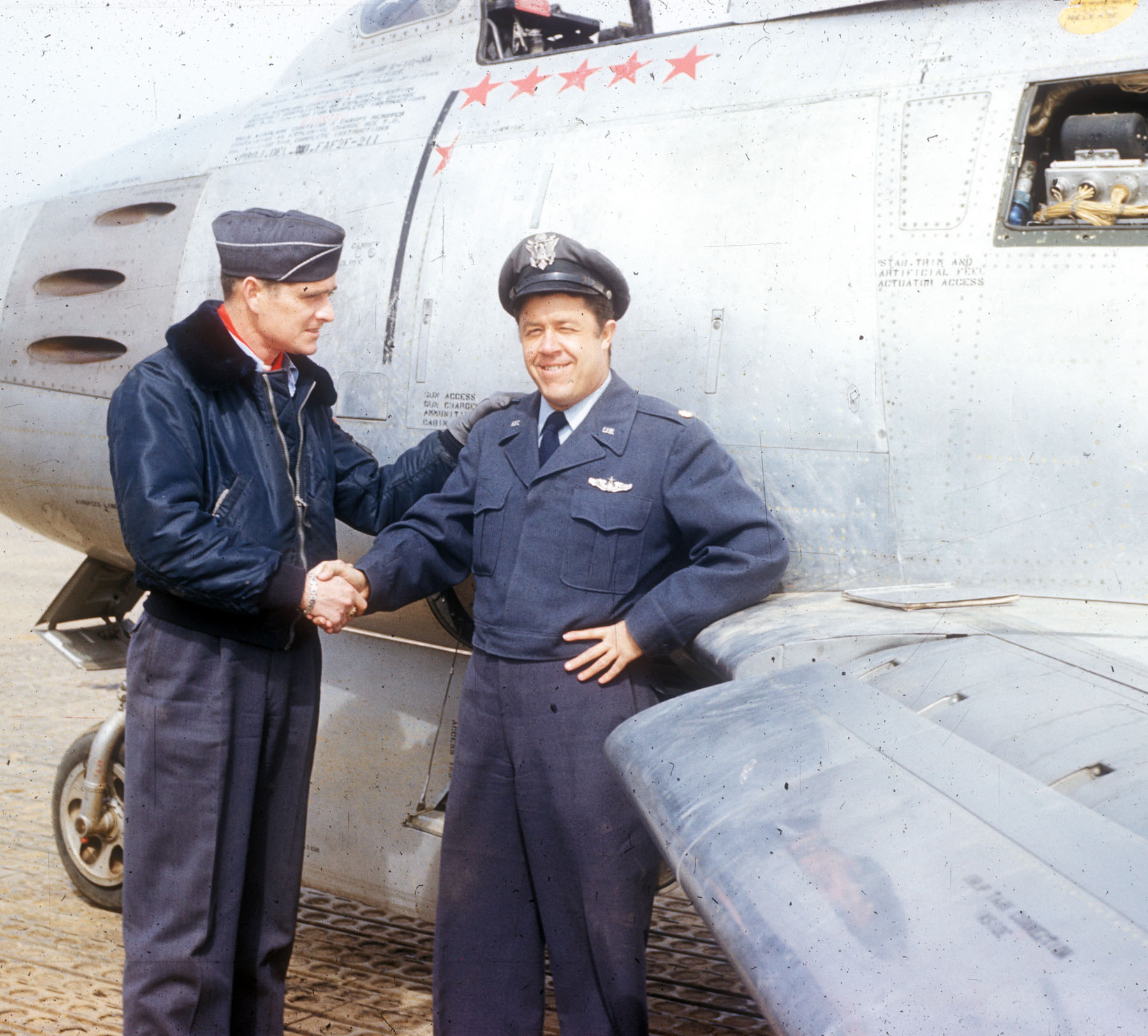
Whisner (left) shakes his hand with Maj. Van Chandler.

Whisner returned to the U.S. in March 1952, where he continued his career as a fighter pilot. Whisner also competed in air races, and in 1953, while a Major, he won the 1,900-mile Bendix Trophy Race, flying an F-86F Sabre jet from Edwards Air Force Base in California to Dayton, Ohio, in what was then a record time of 3 hours 5 minutes and 45 seconds, for an average speed of 603.5 miles an hour. He served with the 3596th Flying Training Squadron at Nellis Air Force Base until December 1954, when he went to Randolph Air Force Base to serve on the staff of Headquarters Crew Training Air Force. Whisner then served as a Royal Air Force exchange officer in London, England, from February 1956 to April 1957, followed by service as commander of the 494th Tactical Fighter Squadron at Chaumont Air Base from April 1957 to April 1959.

He then served on the staff of the Armed Forces Special Weapons Project at Sandia Base from April 1959 to June 1962, and then as a special assistant to the commander for the Combat Crew Training Group at Luke Air Force Base until September 1962, when he became commander of the 4517th Combat Crew Training Squadron, also at Luke Air Force Base.

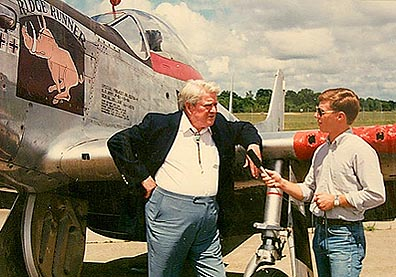
Whisner being interviewed in 1987

After completing Vietnamese Language School, he served as an Operations Staff Officer with Headquarters 2nd Air Division at Tan Son Nhut Air Base in the Republic of Vietnam from October 1963 to October 1964, followed by service on the staff of Pacific Air Forces at Hickam Air Force Base from October 1964 to October 1967, during the Vietnam War. He made several deployments to Southeast Asia, but did not fly any missions during the war.

Whisner then served as Chief of the Fighter Division with Headquarters Tactical Air Command at Langley Air Force Base from October 1967 to June 1969.

He was commander of the 48th Tactical Fighter Wing at RAF Lakenheath, from February 1970 to March 1971. Whisner retired from the Air Force at Kirtland Air Force Base on July 31, 1972.

== Later life and death ==
After retiring as a colonel, he lived quietly in his home state of Louisiana with his wife. Whisner died at his home in Alexandria, Louisiana on July 21, 1989, from complications following being stung by a yellow jacket.

His remains were cremated and scattered into the Red River near Shreveport, his birthplace.

== Aerial victory credits ==
Chronicle of aerial victories
Date	#	Type	Location	Aircraft flown	Unit Assigned
January 29, 1944	1	Focke-Wulf Fw 190	Namur, Belgium	P-47D	487 FS, 352 FG
May 29, 1944	1	Fw 190	Güstrow, Germany	P-51B	487 FS, 352 FG
May 30, 1944	0.5	Messerschmitt Bf 109	Magdeburg, Germany	P-51B	487 FS, 352 FG
November 2, 1944	1	Bf 109	Merseburg, Germany	P-51D	487 FS, 352 FG
November 21, 1944	6	Fw 190	Merseburg, Germany	P-51D	487 FS, 352 FG
November 27, 1944	2	Bf 109	Hameln, Germany	P-51D	487 FS, 352 FG
January 1, 1945	2; 2	Fw 190; Bf-109	Liège, Belgium	P-51D	487 FS, 352 FG
November 8, 1951	1	MiG-15	Sukchon, North Korea	North American F-86A Sabre	334 FIS, 4 FIG
November 9, 1951	1	MiG-15	Sinuiju, North Korea	F-86A	334 FIS, 4 FIW
January 6, 1952	1	MiG-15	North Korea	North American F-86E Sabre	25 FIS, 51 FIW
January 11, 1952	1	MiG-15	North Korea	F-86E	25 FIS, 51 FIW
February 20, 1952	0.5	MiG-15	Uiju, North Korea	F-86E	25 FIS, 51 FIW
February 23, 1952	1	MiG-15	North Korea	F-86E	25 FIS, 51 FIW

SOURCES: Air Force Historical Study 85: USAF Credits for the Destruction of Enemy Aircraft, World War II and Air Force Historical Study 81: USAF Credits for the Destruction of Enemy Aircraft, Korean War, Freeman 1993

== Awards and decorations ==
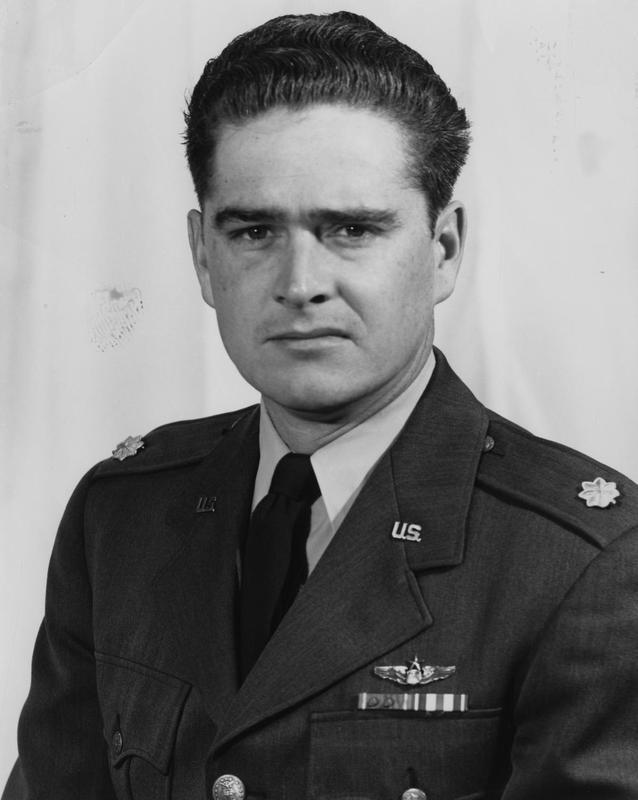
Major William T. Whisner

Whisner received numerous awards and decorations for his services:

US Air Force Command Pilot Badge

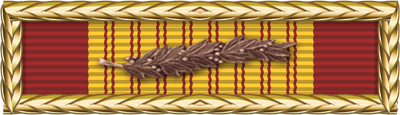
Distinguished Service Cross with two bronze oak leaf clusters
Silver Star
Distinguished Flying Cross with silver and bronze oak leaf clusters
Bronze Star Medal
Air Medal with two silver oak leaf clusters
Air Force Commendation Medal with bronze oak leaf cluster
Air Force Presidential Unit Citation
American Campaign Medal
European-African-Middle Eastern Campaign Medal with four bronze campaign stars
World War II Victory Medal
National Defense Service Medal with bronze service star
Korean Service Medal
Armed Forces Expeditionary Medal
Vietnam Service Medal with two bronze service stars
Air Force Longevity Service Award with silver and bronze oak leaf clusters
Republic of Korea Presidential Unit Citation
Vietnam Gallantry Cross Unit Award
United Nations Service Medal for Korea
Vietnam Campaign Medal
Republic of Korea War Service Medal

=== Distinguished Service Cross citation (1st Award) ===

Whisner Jr., William T.
Captain, U.S. Army Air Forces
487th Fighter Squadron, 352nd Fighter Group, 8th Air Force
Date of Action: November 21, 1944

Citation:

Captain (Air Corps) William T. Whisner Jr., United States Army Air Forces, was awarded the Distinguished Service Cross for extraordinary heroism in connection with military operations against an armed enemy while serving as Pilot of a P-51 Fighter Airplane in the 487th Fighter Squadron, 352d Fighter Group, Eighth Air Force, in aerial combat against enemy forces on 21 November 1944, during an air mission in the European Theater of Operations. On that date, Captain Whisner led a flight of P-51s on an escort mission to Merseburg, Germany. As the bombers left their target, a large formation of enemy fighters struck. In a linked series of attacks, Whisner shot down four Fw 190s in the cover flight and probably got another. With no more than two Fw 190s left in the cover flight he had attacked, Whisner turned his attention to the main enemy formation, exploding an Fw 190 that had not dropped its belly tank. Evading three Fw 190s on his tail, he shot down another that was closing on one of his pilots. Whisner was credited with five Fw 190s and two probables that day. His score later was revised by the Air Force Historical Research Center to six destroyed, making that day one of the best for any USAAF pilot in the skies over Europe. Captain Whisner's unquestionable valor in aerial combat is in keeping with the highest traditions of the military service and reflects great credit upon himself, the 8th Air Force, and the United States Army Air Forces.

=== Distinguished Service Cross citation (2nd Award) ===

Whisner Jr., William T.
Captain, U.S. Army Air Forces
487th Fighter Squadron, 352nd Fighter Group, 8th Air Force
Date of Action: January 1, 1945

Citation:

The President of the United States of America, authorized by Act of Congress, July 9, 1918, takes pleasure in presenting a Bronze Oak Leaf Cluster in lieu of a Second Award of the Distinguished Service Cross to Captain (Air Corps) William T. Whisner Jr., United States Army Air Forces, for extraordinary heroism in connection with military operations against an armed enemy while serving as Pilot of a P-51 Fighter Airplane in the 487th Fighter Squadron, 352d Fighter Group, Eighth Air Force, and as flight leader in a squadron of twelve fighter aircraft taking off on a patrol, 1 January 1945. On this date, as his plane left the ground, Captain Whisner observed 30 hostile fighters preparing to strafe the field. Disregarding the enemy's great superiority in numbers and position, and without waiting to form up with his flight, Captain Whisner attacked alone. In the engagements that followed his aircraft was hit and badly damaged, but determined to defend the field he pressed his attack and destroyed four enemy aircraft. Only after the enemy had been completely dispersed did Captain Whisner halt his pursuit. The extraordinary heroism and determination to destroy the enemy displayed by Captain Whisner on this occasion reflect highest credit upon himself and the Armed Forces of the United States.

=== Distinguished Service Cross citation (3rd Award) ===

Whisner Jr., William T.
Major, U.S. Air Force
25th Fighter Interceptor Squadron, 51st Fighter Interceptor Wing, 5th Air Force
Date of Action: February 23, 1952

Citation:

The President of the United States of America, under the provisions of the Act of Congress approved July 9, 1918, takes pleasure in presenting a Second Bronze Oak Leaf Cluster in lieu of a Third Award of the Distinguished Service Cross to Major William T. Whisner Jr., United States Air Force, for extraordinary heroism in connection with military operations against an armed enemy of the United Nations while serving as a Pilot with the 25th Fighter-Interceptor Squadron, 51st Fighter Interceptor Wing, Fifth Air Force, in action against enemy forces in the Republic of Korea on 23 February 1952. On that date Major Whisner destroyed an enemy MiG-15 aircraft attacking an F-86 piloted by a member of his own group. Major Whisner flew to the immediate aid of the pilot in the face of the enemy's great numerical superiority. With an expertly executed maneuver, he attacked the MiG-15 which was pressing full attack on the friendly aircraft and forced the enemy to break away. As Major Whisner bore in to deter the enemy action, another MiG-15 swept down on his tail and began lobbing shells at his aircraft. In spite of the imminent danger of losing his own life, Major Whisner continued to force the first MiG-15 to break away, and, in the face of overwhelming odds, destroyed the enemy aircraft. The downed MIG-15 raised Major Whisner's record of enemy aircraft destruction to five and one-half and established him as the seventh jet ace of the Korean campaign.

== See also ==
- List of Korean War flying aces
- John C. Meyer
- Gabby Gabreski

== Sources ==
- Lorenz, William E.; Oliver, Dwight L. (1999), The Inner Seven: The History of Seven Unique American Combat 'Aces' of World War II and Korea, Nashville, Tennessee: Turner Publishing Company, ISBN 978-1563115042
- Werrell, Kenneth P. (2005), Sabres Over MiG Alley: The F-86 and the Battle for Air Superiority in Korea, Annapolis, Maryland: Naval Institute Press, ISBN 9781591149330
