= 25th Fighter Squadron =

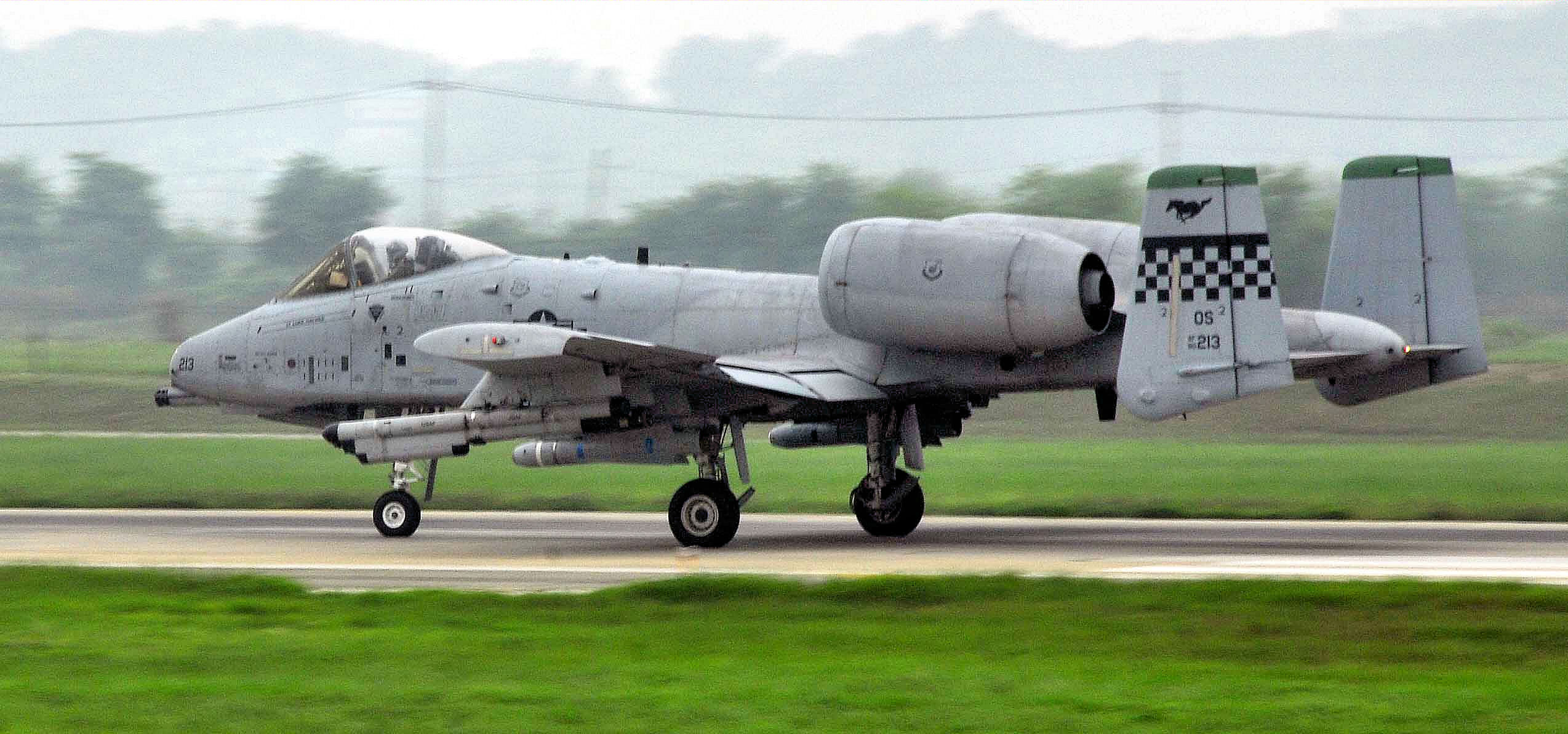
- A-10 Thunderbolt II 80-213 taking off from Osan AB
- Active: 1941–1945; 1946–1960; 1965–1990; 1993–2025
- Country: United States
- Branch: United States Air Force
- Role: Fighter
- Part of: Pacific Air Forces
- Garrison/HQ: Osan Air Base
- Nickname: Assam Draggins
- Motto: "PILSUNG!" (Korean: Certain Victory)
- Colors: Green
- Mascot: Elvis
- Engagements: China-Burma-India Theater; Korean War; Vietnam War
- Decorations: Distinguished Unit Citation; Presidential Unit Citation; Air Force Outstanding Unit Award with Combat "V" Device; Air Force Outstanding Unit Award; Republic of Korea Presidential Unit Citation; Vietnam Gallantry Cross with Palm

Insignia
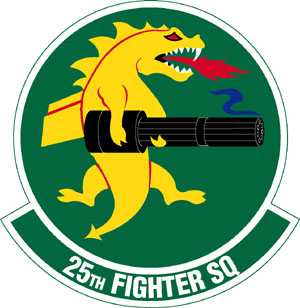
- 25th Fighter Squadron emblem (approved 22 May 1996)

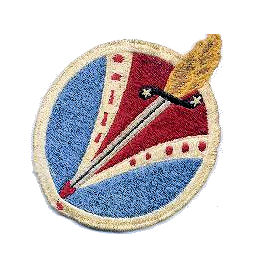
- 25th Fighter Squadron emblem (approved 1 August 1947)

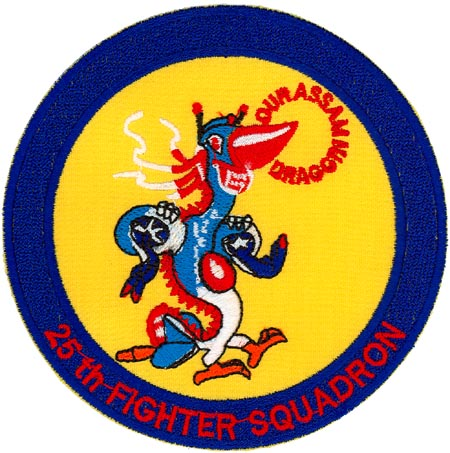
- 25th Fighter Squadron emblem (World War II) (Note: Watkins depicts the emblem in shades of green, rather than blue. This is likely to the use of black and white photographs as a source.)

The 25th Fighter Squadron was part of the US Air Force's 51st Operations Group, 51st Fighter Wing, at Osan Air Base, South Korea. It operated the Fairchild Republic A-10 Thunderbolt II aircraft conducting close air support missions. It was inactivated in June 2025.

== History ==
The squadron was originally created as the 25th Pursuit Squadron and activated at Hamilton Field, California on 15 January 1941. By March it was assigned to the 51st Pursuit Group at March Field, California. In July the squadron received Curtiss P-40 Warhawk aircraft.

=== World War II ===
The 25th sailed to combat operations in the Pacific Theater aboard the SS President Coolidge on 11 January 1942. The squadron was part of the first deployment of U.S. forces leaving the mainland after the declaration of war. The journey to Melbourne, Australia, took 20 days. By late March the 25th Pursuit Squadron had arrived in Karachi, India, and set up wartime operations.

The 25th flew its first aerial combat mission over The Hump on 25 September 1942, flying a combat escort mission. After the squadron moved to Dinjan Airfield in Assam, India, combat activity increased. Due to the terrain, the pilots would usually "drag in" on their passes. It was there that the 25th picked up the name Assam Draggins.

Operations from Dinjan were concentrated against the Japanese in northern Burma along the upper Chindwin and Irrawaddy Rivers. In February 1943 the 25th Fighter Squadron was tasked to defend Fort Hertz near Myitkyina. Fort Hertz was a vital cog in air operations near The Hump. The 25th bombed and strafed enemy troops, concentrations, supply dumps, bridges, and enemy communication lines for twelve consecutive days, but failed to slow the Japanese advance on Fort Hertz. North American B-25 Mitchell medium bombers were needed to halt the Japanese drive, but none were available. Lieutenant Colonel John E. Barr, the executive officer for the 51st Fighter Group, modified a P-40 to carry 1,000 pound bombs, and by May 1943, the Japanese offensive had been halted.

The 25th Fighter Squadron encountered more combat activity than any other unit within the 51st Fighter Group during the war. The squadron returned to the United States and was inactivated on 12 December 1945.

=== Postwar ===
On 15 October 1946, the 25th was reactivated at Naha Air Base, Okinawa, where the squadron was assigned Republic P-47 Thunderbolt and Lockheed P-80 Shooting Star aircraft. As part of the occupation force, the 25th provided defense for the Ryukyu Islands.

=== Korean War ===
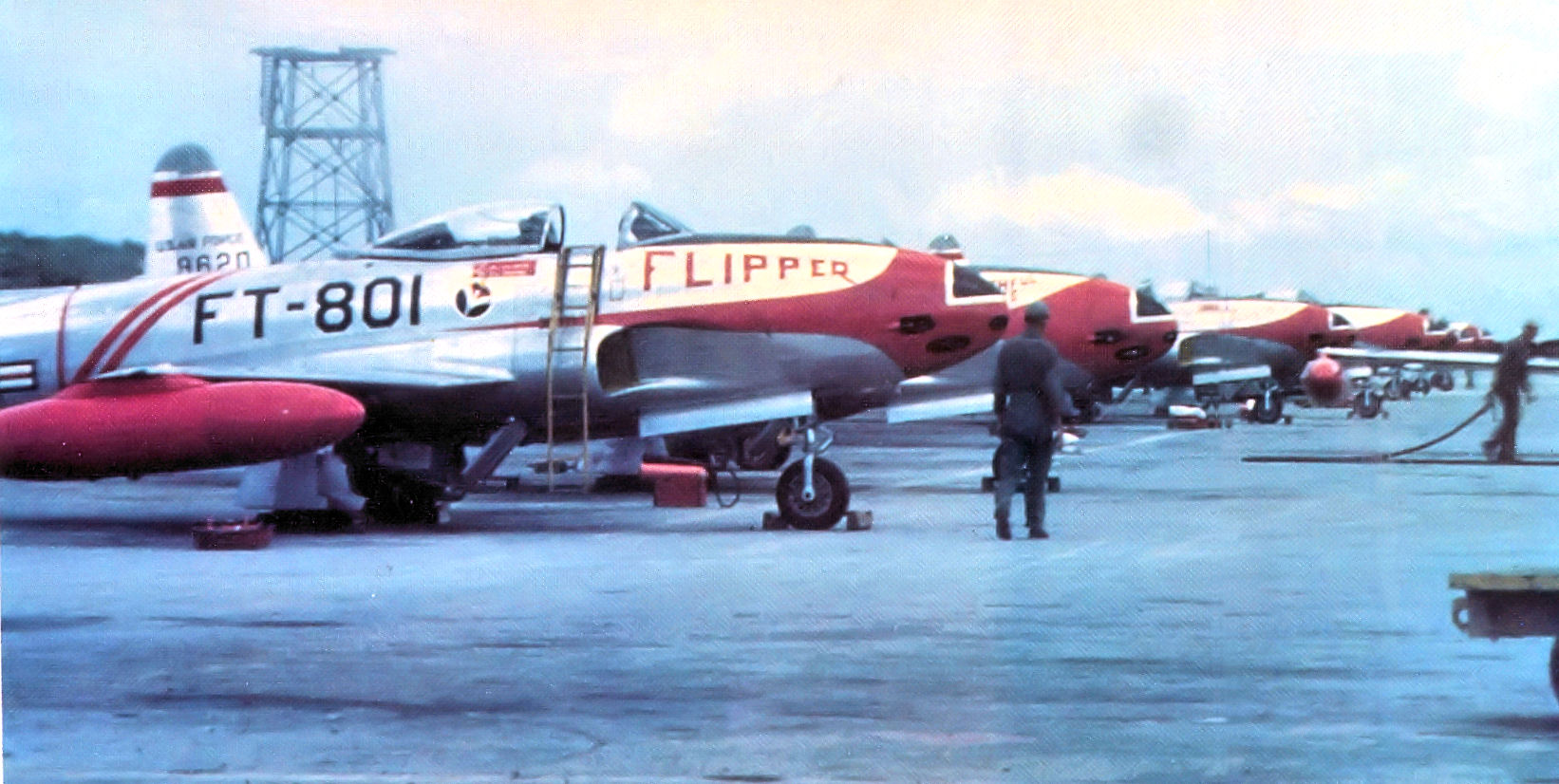
New F-80C Shooting Stars at Itazuke Air Base, Japan, 1950 (Note: Lockheed F-80C-LO serial 49-801 is in the foreground.)

The 25th was placed on alert when hostilities erupted in Korea in June 1950. The unit moved to Itazuke Air Base, Japan, in September, and to Kimpo Air Base, Korea, by October. The Chinese People's Volunteer Army intervention in December 1950 forced a retreat of U.N. forces from North Korea into the South. The 25th flew more than 21 sorties each day that month to save the 2nd Infantry Division, which had been cut off by the enemy near Kunuri, from being overrun. Air cover was officially credited with preventing disastrous losses to the division.

On 20 November 1951, squadron pilots received their new North American F-86 Sabre aircraft and went to face the Chinese, North Korean, and Soviet pilots in their MiG-15 aircraft. Major William T. Whisner Jr. got his fifth MiG kill on 23 February 1952, becoming an ace.

=== Post Korean War ===
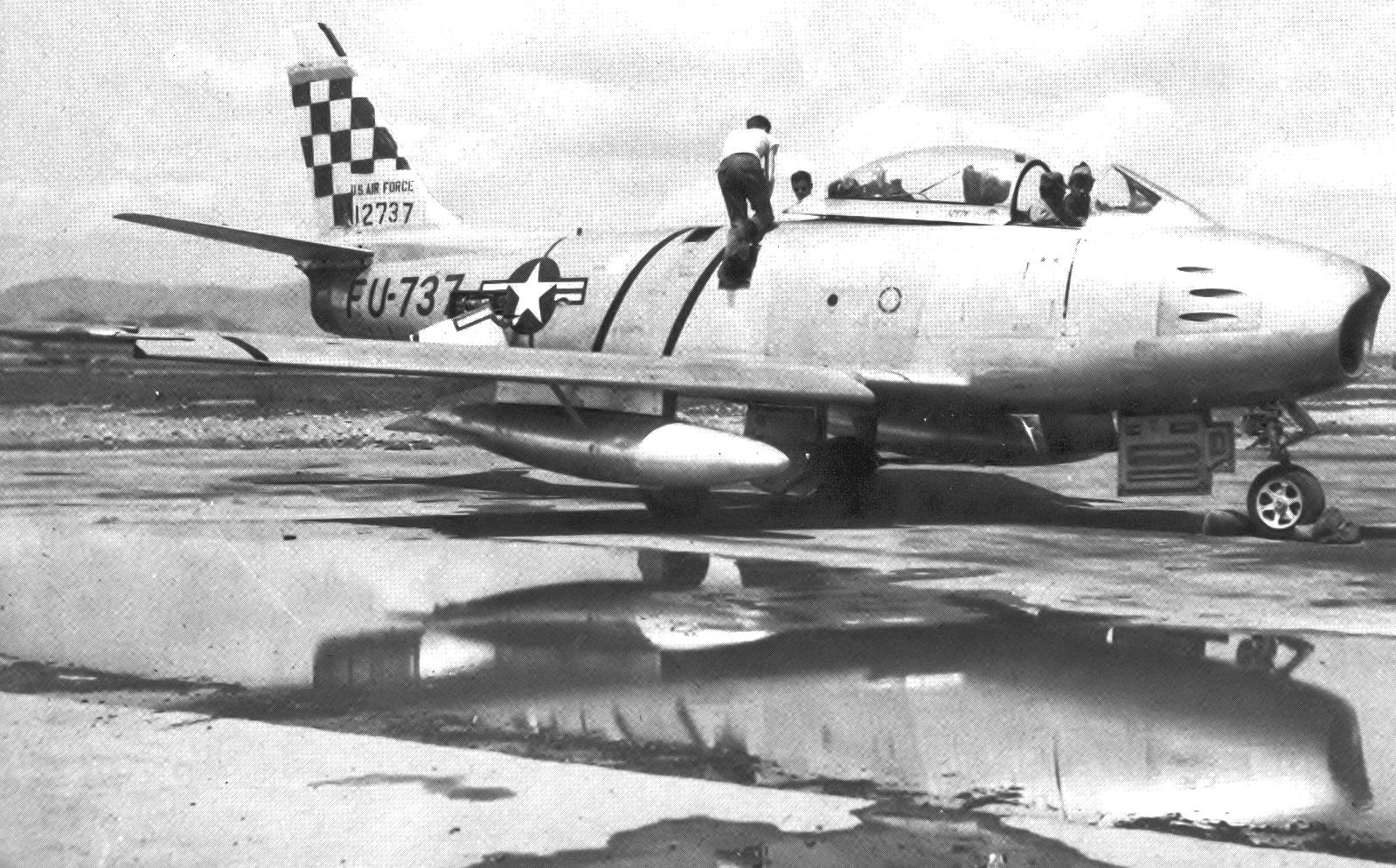
Squadron F-86E Sabre at Mangun AB (Note: Aircraft is North American F-86E-10-NA Sabre serial 51-2737 at K-12 (Mangun AB), South Korea, 1952.)

After the war, the 25th was assigned to the 51st Fighter-Interceptor Wing at Naha Air Base, Okinawa. While there, the pilots were deployed for one week at a time to Kadena Air Base, Okinawa. From 1960 to 1965, the 25th Fighter Squadron remained in a state of suspended animation with virtually no mission and only 20 percent manning. On 17 June 1965, the unit was redesignated the 25th Tactical Fighter Squadron and assigned to the 33d Tactical Fighter Wing at Eglin Air Force Base, Florida.

=== Vietnam War ===
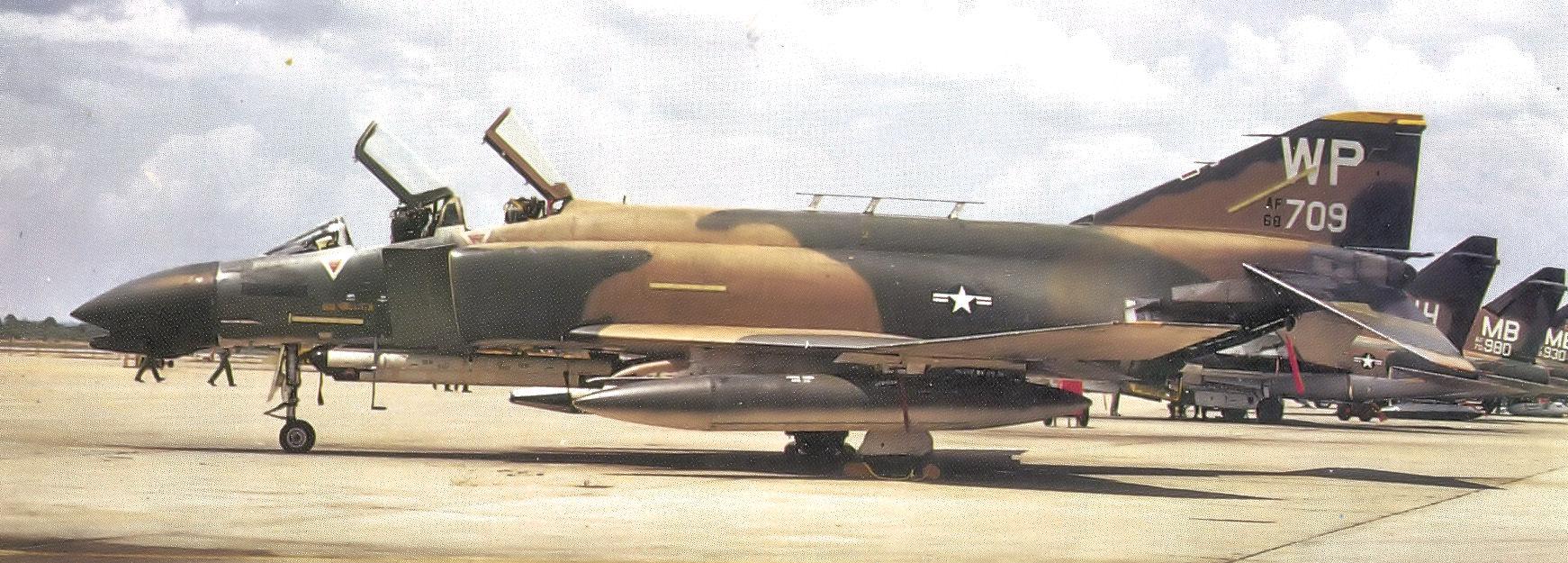
25th Tactical Fighter Squadron F-4D Phantom II (Note: Aircraft is McDonnell F-4D-32-MC Phantom serial 66-8709 at Korat RTAFB, 1974. This aircraft was retired to the Aerospace Maintenance and Regeneration Center as FP0164 on 6 October 1988.)

On 31 May 1968, the 25th was assigned to the 8th Tactical Fighter Wing and stationed at Ubon Royal Thai Air Force Base, later moving to Udorn Royal Thai Air Force Base, Thailand, once again seeing combat in the skies of Vietnam. Flying McDonnell F-4 Phantom II aircraft, the 25th received the Presidential Unit Citation (1971), the Republic of Vietnam Gallantry Cross with Palm (1967–1973), and five Air Force Outstanding Unit Awards (1967–1973).

=== Post Vietnam War – Present ===
When the Air Force began its withdrawal from Thailand, the 25th was reassigned the 18th Tactical Fighter Wing at Kadena Air Base, Okinawa, where it remained until 1 February 1981. On that date, the 25th was relocated without personnel or equipment to Suwon Air Base, Republic of Korea, and assigned to the 51st Composite Wing.

On 28 January 1982, the 25th received its first Fairchild Republic A-10 Thunderbolt II aircraft. The squadron's presence helped maintain a peaceful armistice between North and South Korea until 2 October 1989. It was during that time that the 25th began transferring aircraft to the 19th Tactical Air Support Squadron and other stateside units. The 25th was then inactivated on 1 July 1990. On 1 October 1993, the 25th Fighter Squadron was reactivated under the 51st Wing at Osan Air Base, Republic of Korea, under the command of Lieutenant Colonel Syd McPherson. The 25th has since added six A-10 aircraft to its fleet, making it a dual qualified A/OA-10 squadron. It was inactivated in June 2025.

== Lineage ==
- Constituted as the 25th Pursuit Squadron (Interceptor) on 20 November 1940

Activated on 15 January 1941
Redesignated 25th Pursuit Squadron (Fighter) on 12 March 1941
Redesignated 25th Fighter Squadron (Twin Engine) on 15 May 1942
Redesignated 25th Fighter Squadron on 1 June 1942
Redesignated 25th Fighter Squadron, Single Engine on 28 February 1944
Inactivated on 12 December 1945

- Activated on 15 October 1946

Redesignated 25th Fighter Squadron, Jet Propelled on 19 February 1947
Redesignated 25th Fighter Squadron, Jet on 10 August 1948
Redesignated 25th Fighter-Interceptor Squadron on 1 February 1950
Discontinued on 8 June 1960

- Redesignated 25th Tactical Fighter Squadron on 18 June 1965

Organized 20 June 1965
Inactivated 31 July 1990

- Redesignated 25th Fighter Squadron

Activated 1 October 1993
Inactivated 12 June 2025

=== Assignments ===
- 51st Pursuit Group (later 51st Fighter Group), 15 January 1941 – 12 December 1945
- 51st Fighter Group (later 51st Fighter-Interceptor Group, 15 October 1946 (attached to 51st Fighter-Interceptor Wing after 1 July 1957)
- 51st Fighter-Interceptor Wing, 25 October 1957 – 8 June 1960
- Tactical Air Command, 18 June 1965 (not organized)
- 33d Tactical Fighter Wing, 20 June 1965
- 8th Tactical Fighter Wing, 28 May 1968
- 432d Tactical Reconnaissance Wing (later 432d Tactical Fighter Wing), 5 July 1974
- 3d Tactical Fighter Wing, 18 December 1975
- 18th Tactical Fighter Wing, 19 December 1975
- 18th Tactical Fighter Group, 1 May 1978
- 51st Composite Wing (later 51st Tactical Fighter Wing), 1 February 1981 – 31 July 1990
- 51st Operations Group, 1 October 1993 – 12 June 2025

=== Stations ===
- Hamilton Field, California, 15 January 1941
- March Field, California, 11 June 1941 – 10 June 1942
- Karachi, India, 12 March 1942
- Dinjan Airfield, India, 22 November 1942

Detachment operated from Sadiya, India, 6 November 1942 – 2 April 1943
Detachment operated from Jorhat, India, 2 April–14 September 1943

- Yunnani, China, 14 September 1943

Detachment operated from Poashan, China, 30 November 1944 – January 1945
Detachment operated from Leangshan, China, 10 January–February 1945
Detachment operated from Poseh, China, 4 February–28 May 1945

- Loping, China, September–November 1945
- Fort Lewis, Washington, 11–12 December 1945
- Yontan Airfield, Okinawa, 15 October 1946
- Naha Airfield, Okinawa, 22 May 1947
- Itazuke Air Base, Japan, 22 September 1950
- Kimpo Air Base, South Korea, 23 October 1950
- Itazuke Air Base, Japan, 4 January 1951
- Tsuiki Air Base, Japan, 22 January 1951
- Suwon Air Base, South Korea, 20 July 1951
- Naha Air Base, Okinawa, 1 August 1954 – 8 June 1960
- Eglin Air Force Base, Florida, 20 June 1965 – 25 May 1968
- Ubon Royal Thai Air Force Base, Thailand, 28 May 1968
- Udorn Royal Thai Air Force Base, Thailand, 5 July 1974
- Clark Air Base, Philippines, 18 December 1975
- Kadena Air Base, Japan, 19 December 1975
- Suwon Air Base, South Korea, 1 February 1981
- Osan Air Base, South Korea, c. 10 November 1989 – 31 July 1990
- Osan Air Base, South Korea, 1 October 1993 – 12 June 2025

=== Aircraft ===
- Curtiss P-40 Warhawk (1941–1945)
- Lockheed P-38 Lightning (1944)
- North American P-51 Mustang (1944–1945)
- Republic P-47 Thunderbolt (1946–1947)
- Lockheed F-80 Shooting Star (1947–1951)
- North American F-86D Sabre (1951–1960)
- McDonnell F-4 Phantom II (1965–1980)
- Fairchild Republic A-10 Thunderbolt II (1982–1989, 1993–12 June 2025)
