= Hugo P. Rush =

United States Army general

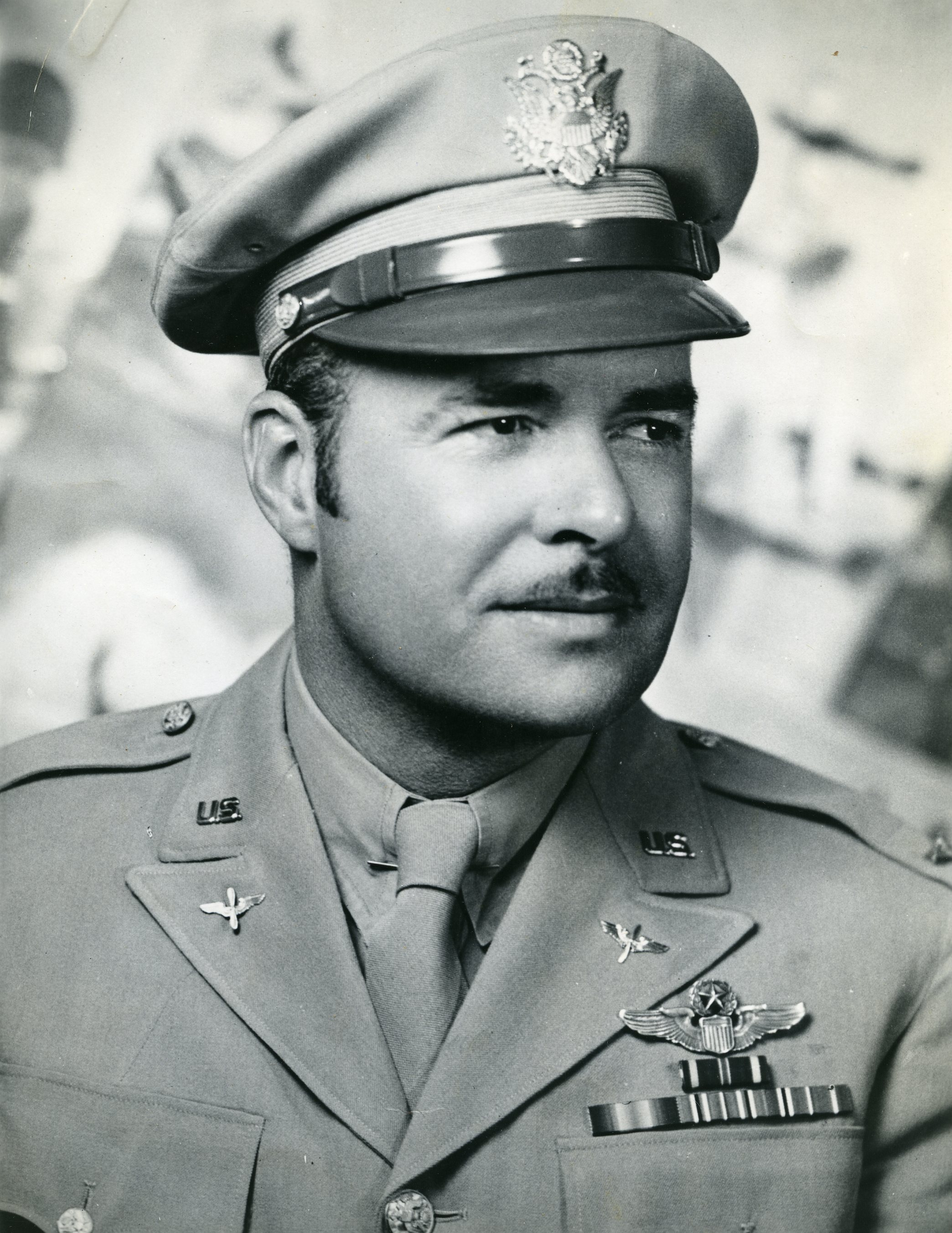
- Born: September 13, 1900; Pequea Township, Pennsylvania
- Died: February 1, 1979 (aged 78); Clearwater, Florida
- Education: United States Military Academy; Massachusetts Institute of Technology
- Occupation: Military officer

Hugo Peoples Rush (September 13, 1900 – February 1, 1979) was a major general in the United States Air Force.

== Early life and education ==
Hugo Peoples Rush was born in 1900 in Pequea Township, Pennsylvania. After graduating from Quarryville High School, he went to the United States Military Academy at West Point, New York.

== Career ==
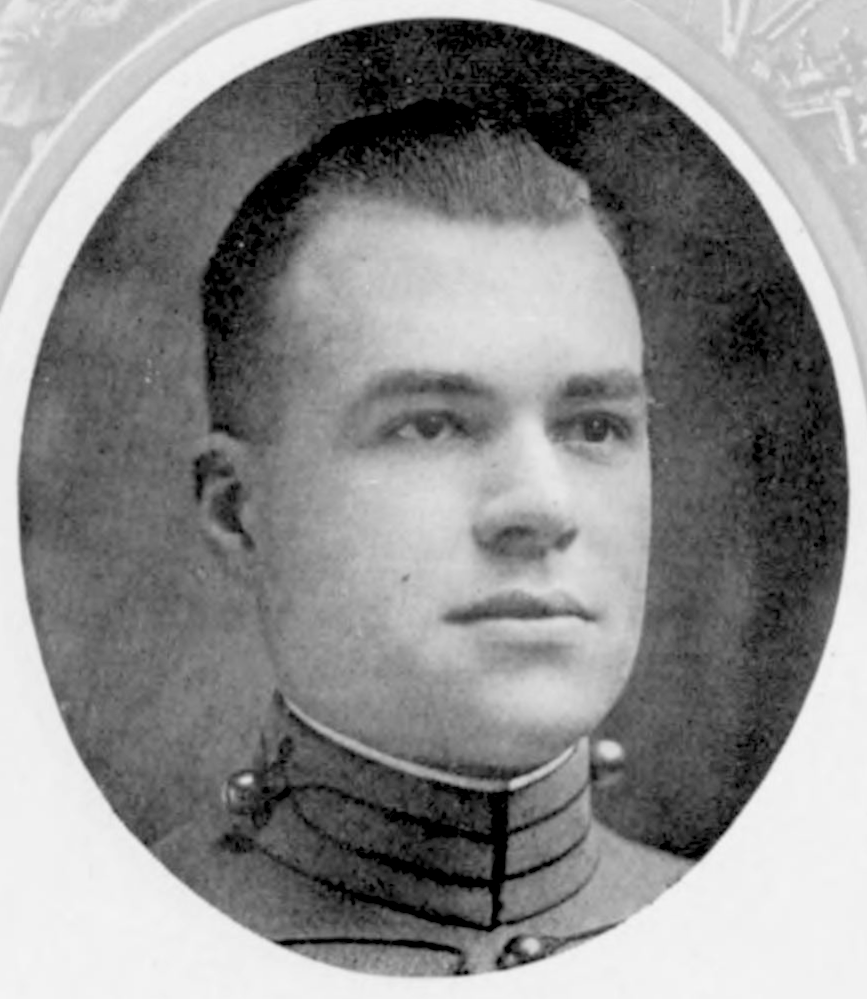
At West Point in 1920

Rush graduated from the United States Military Academy as a commissioned second lieutenant of infantry on July 2, 1920. He would later join the Wisconsin Army National Guard and serve as an instructor before joining the 54th Infantry Regiment. In April 1924 he transferred to the United States Army Air Service. He was later sent to the Massachusetts Institute of Technology to study aeronautical engineering. Rush graduated from the Air Corps Tactical School in 1939.

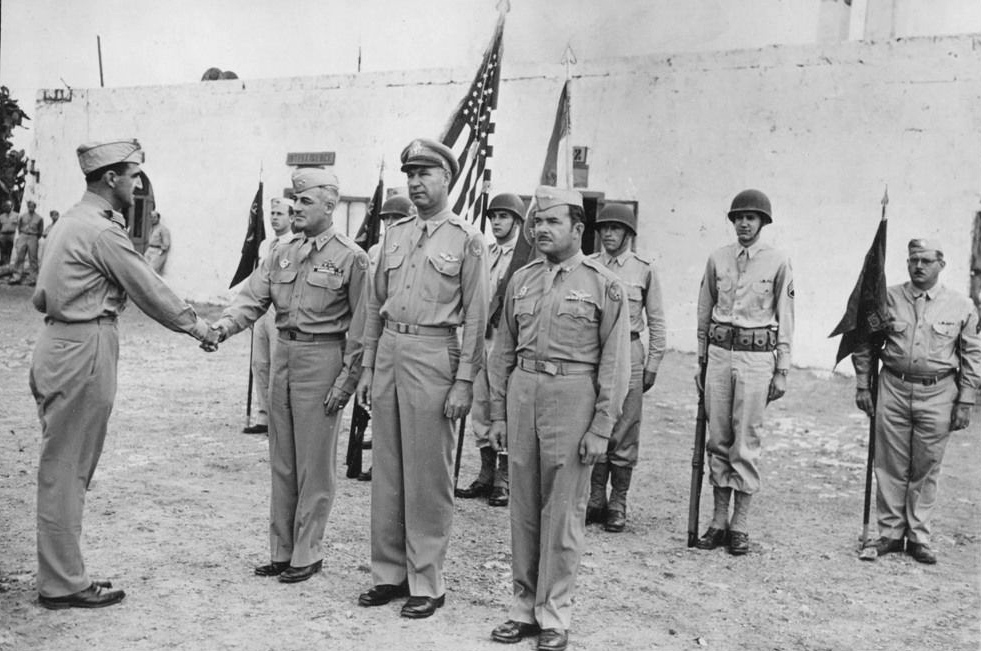
Rush (front right) as commander of the 47th Bombardment Wing in 1943

During World War II he held command of the 44th Bombardment Group, the 98th Bombardment Group, the 15th Wing, and the 47th Bombardment Wing. Rush was promoted to brigadier general in 1944. Following his service in the war he was given command of the 17th Bomb Operational Training Wing and VIII Bomber Command before being named the Commanding General of Keesler Field in 1946. Later assignments included holding command of the 301st Fighter Wing.

He would become a member of the Air Force after its inception in 1947. In 1948 he was given the command of the 51st Fighter Wing, promoted as major general in 1950, and retired from the USAF in 1951.

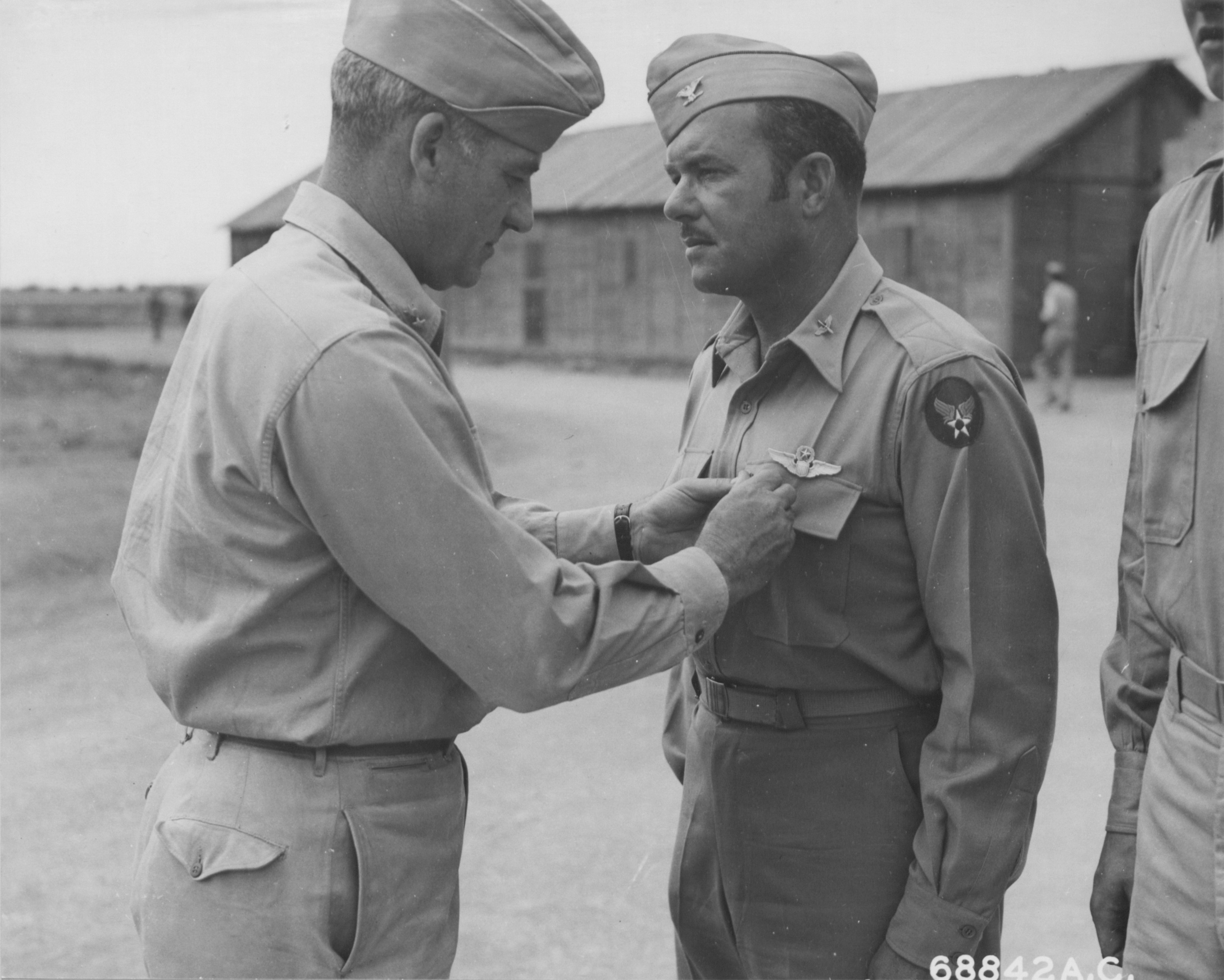
Rush receives the Silver Star from Maj. Gen. Nathan F. Twining in 1944

Awards he received include the Distinguished Service Medal, the Silver Star, the Legion of Merit, the Distinguished Flying Cross, and the Air Medal with three oak leaf clusters.

He died in Clearwater, Florida on February 1, 1979.
