= Suwon Air Base =

Airbase in South Korea

Suwon Air Base 수원공군기지
- IATA: SWU; ICAO: RKSW

Summary
- Airport type: Military/Public
- Owner/Operator: Republic of Korea Air Force
- Location: Suwon
- Elevation AMSL: 88 ft (27 m)
- Coordinates: 37°14′19″N 127°00′25″E

Map
- Location within South Korea Location within Asia Location within North Pacific Location within Earth

Runways
Direction	Length		Surface
Direction	m	ft	Surface
15L/33R		9,000
15R/33L		9,000
16/34		7,535

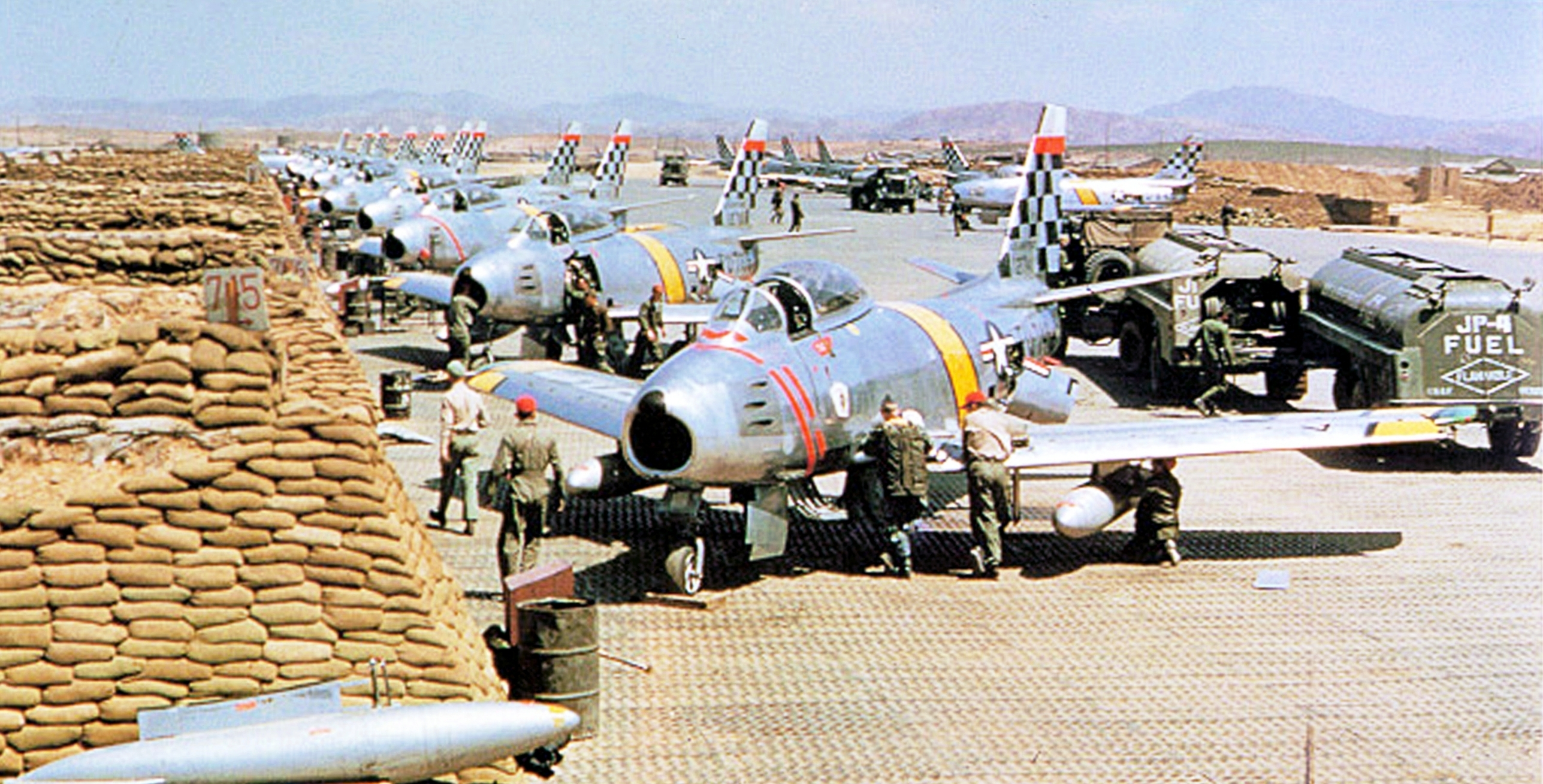
United States Air Force North American F-86 Sabre fighters from the 51st Fighter Interceptor Wing Checkertails are readied for combat during the Korean War at Suwon Air Base

Suwon Air Base (IATA: SWU, ICAO: RKSW) is a Republic of Korea Air Force (ROKAF) base near Suwon city.

== Units ==
The base is home to the ROKAF's 10th Fighter Wing (제10전투비행단), comprising:

- 101st Fighter Squadron flying KF-5E/KF-5F/F-5F
- 153rd Fighter Squadron flying F-4E (Retired)
- 201st Fighter Squadron flying KF-5E/KF-5F/F-5F

The US Army 6th Battalion, 52nd Air Defense Artillery Regiment operating Patriot missiles is stationed at the base.

== History ==
=== Korean War ===
The base was originally established during the Korean War as Suwon (K-13) Air Base and hosted United States Air Force units.

The base was evacuated on the night of 30 June 1950 in the face of the Korean People's Army (KPA) attack, but the base was not occupied by the KPA until 2 July 1950.

The base was recaptured on 24 September 1950 following the Inchon landings. The 811th Engineer Aviation Battalion arrived at the base on 1 October to repair the airfield and laid down PSP over the runway.

The base was evacuated in the face of the Chinese Third Phase Campaign on 5 January 1951 and the base's buildings were destroyed. The base was recaptured on 28 January as part of Operation Thunderbolt and by 6 March, despite its poor condition, the base was used for the staging of F-86 patrols along the Yalu River and Mig Alley.

USAF units based at Suwon included:

- 4th Fighter Wing from 30 March-23 August 1951
- 8th Fighter Wing from 23 August 1951 – 20 October 1954
- 51st Fighter Wing from 1 October 1951 – 26 July 1954
- 12th Fighter Squadron operating P-51s in 1950
- 16th Fighter Squadron operating F-86Ds from 20 May 1951-July 1954
- 25th Fighter Squadron operating F-86Ds from 1951 to 1954
- 35th Fighter Squadron operating P-51s in 1950 and operating F-80s from 1951 to 1952 and operating F-86F Sabrejets from 1953 to 1954
- 36th Fighter Squadron operating P-51s in 1950 and operating F-80s from 1951 to 1954
- 39th Fighter Squadron operating F-86Ds from 1952 to 1954
- 67th Fighter Squadron operating P-51s in December 1950
- 68th Fighter Squadron operating F-94s from March-19 April 1951, 23–27 June 1951 and 24 August 1951 – 23 March 1952
- 80th Fighter Squadron operating F-80s and later F-86s from 24 August 1951 – 21 October 1954
- 319th Fighter Interceptor Squadron operating F-94Bs from 10 March 1952 – 17 August 1954
- 334th Fighter Squadron operating F-86s from 10 March-1 May 1951
- 335th Fighter Squadron operating F-86s from 1 May-1 August 1951
- 336th Fighter Squadron operating F-86s from 6 April-27 June 1951

On 17 June 1951, at 01:10, Suwon was bombed by two Korean People's Air Force Polikarpov Po-2s. Each biplane dropped a pair of fragmentation bombs. Two bombs burst on the flight line of the 335th Fighter Squadron. One F-86A, AF Ser. No. 49-1334 was struck on the wing and began burning; the fire took hold, gutting the aircraft. Eight other Sabres were also damaged in the attack.

On 22 December 1952, a Hellenic Air Force C-47D, Ser. No. 49-2612 was taxiing at Suwon Air Base when it was hit by USAF F-80, AF Ser. No. 49-0722, that was taking off, killing all 13 on board the C-47.

=== Postwar ===
USAF units based at Suwon included:

- 25th Fighter Squadron operating A-10s from 1981 to 1989
- 82nd Fighter Squadron operating F-102s from 30 January-20 February 1968 as part of Operation Combat Fox and on rotation from 1968 to 1971
- 336th Fighter Squadron operating F-4s from 25 March – 17 April 1977

=== Accidents and incidents ===
On October 10, 1984, a corporately owned Northrop F-20 Tigershark, AF Ser. No. 82-0062, c/n GG1001, FAA registration N4416T, on a world sales tour, crashed at Suwon, killing Northrop chief test pilot Darrell Cornell. During the last maneuver of the final demonstration flight, the aircraft stalled at the top of an erratic vertical climb and dove into the ground from 1,800 feet (550 m).

On May 23, 1996, Korean People's Air Force Captain Lee Chul-Su defected in a Shenyang J-6 (#529), landing at Suwon.

On May 5, 2006 Captain Kim Do-hyun of the ROKAF's Black Eagles display team was killed when he lost control of his A-37B Dragonfly during an air show.

On January 11, 2022, Major Shim Jeong-min from ROKAF's 10th Fighter Wing was killed due to an engine fire in his KF-5E during training. He stayed in the jet to avoid crashing into a nearby village.
