= Thomas R. Olsen =

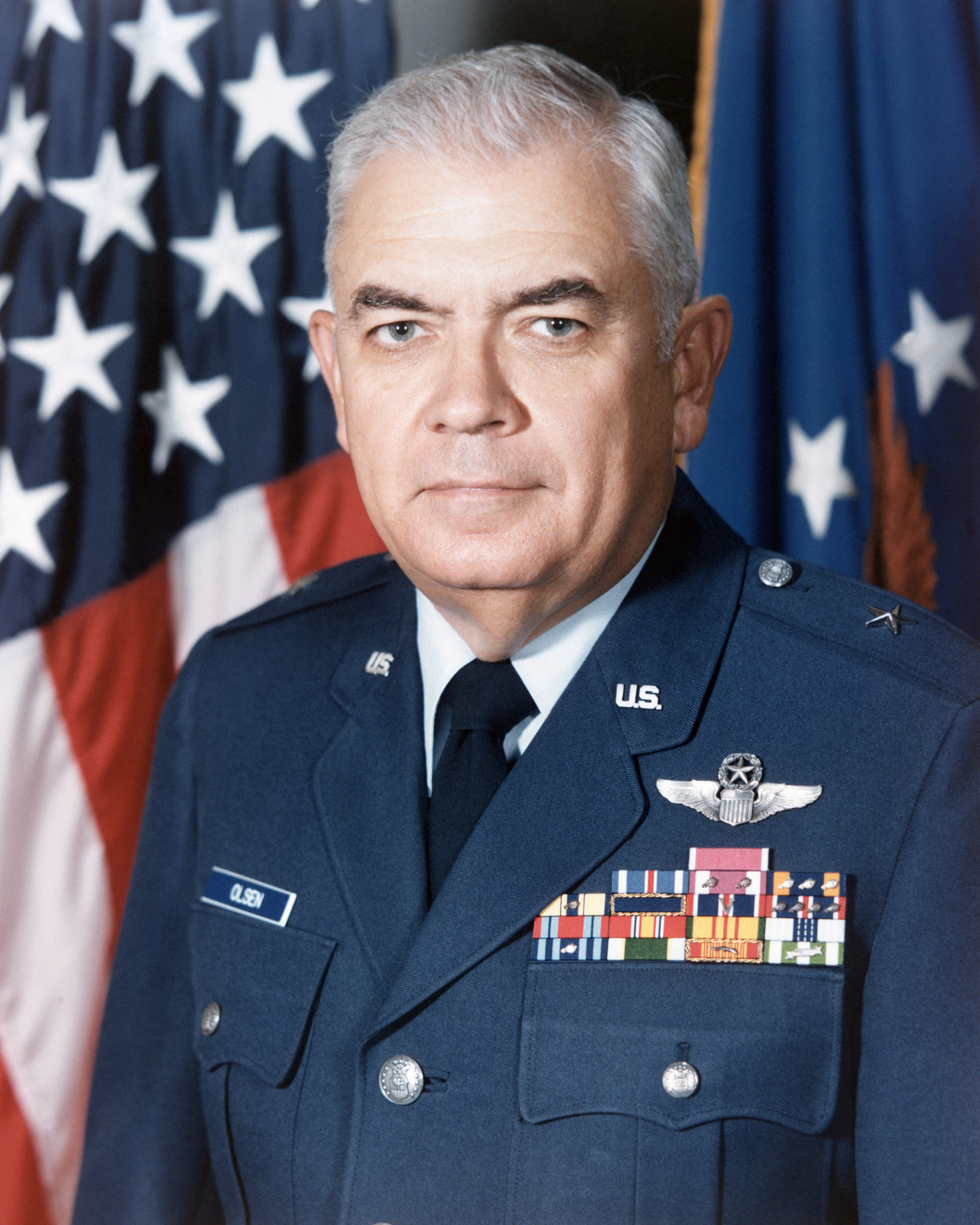
- Born: June 28, 1934; Houston, Texas
- Died: January 5, 2014 (aged 79); Sumter, South Carolina
- Military career
- Allegiance: United States of America
- Branch: United States Air Force
- Rank: Major general
- Conflicts: Vietnam War
- Awards: Defense Superior Service Medal; Legion of Merit; Distinguished Flying Cross; Meritorious Service Medal with two oak leaf clusters; Air Medal with 15 oak leaf clusters; Air Force Commendation Medal

Thomas R. Olsen (June 28, 1934 – January 5, 2014) was a major general in the United States Air Force.

== Biography ==
Olsen was born in Houston, Texas, in 1934. He died on January 5, 2014, at the age of 79.

== Career ==
Olsen completed Squadron Officer School in 1964, Naval Command and Staff College in 1968, and Air War College in 1975. Olsen, from June 1983 to July 1985 was assigned to Headquarters U.S. Pacific Command, Camp H.M. Smith, Hawaii, as deputy director for operations. He then served as assistant chief of staff for operations, Allied Forces Central Europe, Brunssum, Netherlands. In October 1987 he became chief of staff and deputy commander, 4th Allied Tactical Air Force, Heidelberg, West Germany. His retirement was effective as of November 1, 1991.

Awards he received include the Defense Superior Service Medal, Legion of Merit, Distinguished Flying Cross, Meritorious Service Medal with two oak leaf clusters, Air Medal with 15 oak leaf clusters, and Air Force Commendation Medal.
