= Zhang Jihui =

Chinese air force general (1927–2023)

- 张积慧
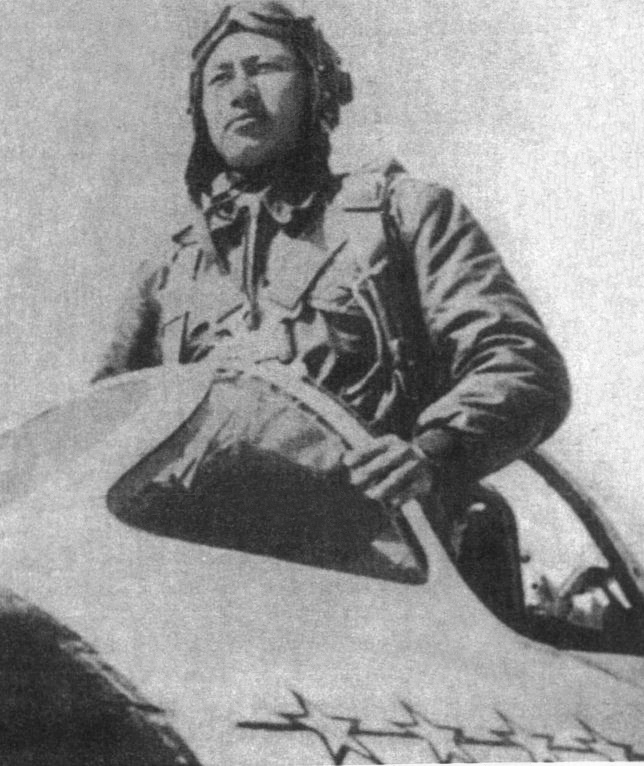
- Zhang Jihui after four victories
- Born: 10 February 1927; Rongcheng, Shandong, China
- Died: 26 April 2023 (aged 96); Beijing, China
- Military career
- Allegiance: China
- Branch: Eighth Route Army; People's Liberation Army Air Force
- Service years: 1945–1978
- Commands: 27th Aviation Division; 1st Aviation Corps; Deputy Commander, People's Liberation Army Air Force
- Conflicts: Korean War
- Awards: Combat Hero (1st Class); Meritorious Service (Special Class); Meritorious Service (1st Class); Meritorious Service (2nd Class); Freedom and Independence Medal (2nd Class)

Zhang Jihui (Chinese: 张积慧; pinyin: Zhāng Jīhuì; 10 February 1927 – 26 April 2023) was the Deputy Commander of the Chinese People's Liberation Army Air Force (PLAAF) and a highly decorated fighter pilot during the Korean War. Zhang joined the PLAAF in 1945 and was one of the first combat pilots trained for the PLAAF. He was later posted at the Chinese 4th Aviation Division, which was also the first Chinese air unit that entered combat during the Korea War. On 10 February 1952, Zhang became famous in China due to the death of American ace Major George Andrew Davis, Jr., and he was credited by the Chinese with shooting down the American ace. Russian sources disputed his claim 40 years later, with different theories as to who might have engaged him and how they might have done it. Zhang claimed a total of four victories during his service in Korea, and he was awarded the title Combat Hero, 1st Class during his service. After the Korean War, Zhang held various commands and became the Deputy Commander of PLAAF in 1973. Outside of his military career, Zhang was also the Deputy Mayor of Yantai.

== Early life and military career ==
Zhang Jihui was born at Rongcheng, Shandong in January 1927. He was born into a poor peasant family of seven that lived off 2 km^{2} (490 acres) of land. His father, Zhang Benzhou, was a farmer and a member of the Chinese Communist Party. Zhang entered elementary school at the age of 10, and he became a school teacher after finishing elementary school at Ningjin County in 1943.

Zhang soon abandoned his job in order to pursue higher education. While studying at university in 1945, he joined the Chinese Communist Eighth Route Army during the Second Sino-Japanese War. After the Japanese surrendered, his unit was moved into Manchuria, where the Chinese Communist People's Liberation Army (PLA) had set up its first pilot school. Zhang was sent to study at the school and graduated in 1948. He was among the first group of pilots trained for the fledgling People's Liberation Army Air Force (PLAAF). In 1950, Zhang became a group leader at the 4th Aviation Division.

== Combat in Korea ==
When the PLAAF officially entered the air war over Korea in September 1951, Zhang's 4th Aviation Division was the first PLAAF unit sent into combat, and it was under the command of the Soviet 64th Aviation Corps. The 4th Aviation Division was stationed at Langtou Airfield in Liaoning Province, and it was composed of 55 MiG-15s. Zhang first entered two aerial engagements with no victory, but he soon claimed his first victory on 16 October 1951. While intercepting a UN flight on October 16, Zhang claimed to shoot down one aircraft while forcing a F-86 Sabre to crash. For this action he was awarded the Meritorious Service, 1st Class. On 4 February 1952, Zhang claimed his third victory against a F-86 and received the Meritorious Service, 2nd Class.

== Death of Major Davis ==
On 10 February 1952, US F-86 Sabre ace Major George Andrew Davis, Jr. was shot down by a MiG-15 during his 16th mission in the MiG Alley near Kunu-ri. Davis was the highest-ranking Korean War ace at the time, and he was posthumously celebrated as a hero and received the Medal of Honor. About 36 MiG-15s from the 4th Aviation Division were involved in the engagement in which Davis was killed, and Zhang was among the group. According to Zhang's own report after the battle, while the MiGs were en route to intercept Davis' group, he and his wingman became separated from the main element. As Zhang was trying to rejoin his formation, he spotted a group of eight F-86s in the area between Taechon and Chongye at 0740. Zhang and his wingman then swung down onto the tails of two Sabres and opened fire. Zhang claimed that he shot down both Sabres, but enemy reinforcements soon destroyed his MiG while killing his wingman.

The publicity of Davis' death soon caught the Chinese attention. To determine whether Davis was killed by Zhang in the absence of gun camera footage, the 4th Aviation Division had sent two search teams on February 16 and 18, and they recovered wreckage of F-86E, along with Davis' body and his belongings. The search team had also discovered that the crash site was within 500 m (550 yd) of where Zhang had bailed out, and that Zhang's 12th Regiment was the only unit that operated near the area; the nearest Soviet unit was operating dozens of kilometers away. In light of those findings and the testimonies from the ground troops that had witnessed the battle, Zhang was credited by the PVA air force with shooting down Davis' F-86. Davis' dog tag is currently on display at the Memorial of the War to Resist US Aggression and Aid Korea in Dandong.

Although Zhang was credited by the PLAAF with shooting down Davis' F-86, doubts about the claim were raised due to US Air Force's recollection of the event was inconsistent with Zhang's own account of the battle, and that Davis had claimed to have shot down two Chinese MiGs moments before being killed. The lack of gun camera footage from the Chinese side meant Zhang's victory claim also hinged on his own recollection of the event. After declassifying their involvement in the Korean War 40 years later, Russian sources disputed Zhang's claim by raising the possibility that 1st Lieutenant Mikhail Akimovich Averin was the MiG pilot that had shot down Davis' plane. According to the recollections from the pilots of the Soviet 64th Aviation Corps, both Zhang and his wingman were probably shot down by Davis, who was in turn surprised and shot down by Mikhail A. Averin scrambling to save the Chinese MiGs. Lieutenant General Georgy Lobov, commander of the 64th Aviation Corps, also noted in his memoir that Davis was killed by a Soviet pilot. Currently, both China and Russia have taken credit for Davis' death with no conclusive evidence to confirm either side of the story.

Regardless of the controversy surrounding Davis' death, Zhang became a household name in China. The PLAAF later awarded Zhang the title Combat Hero, 1st Class for this action.

According to official records, Zhang had participated in 10 aerial engagements with a total of four victories during his service in Korea, and for his service, Zhang received the Meritorious Service, Special Class. The North Korean government also awarded Zhang the Freedom and Independence Medal, 2nd Class.

== Later life and death ==
Immediately after the war, Zhang was sent to study at the Red Banner Air Force Academy in the Soviet Union and returned to China in 1957 after graduation. He steadily climbed the ranks by assuming the command of the 27th Aviation Division in 1964 and later took command of the 1st Aviation Corps in 1970. In 1973, he was named the Deputy Commander of the PLAAF.

In July 1978, Zhang was stripped of his ranks and imprisoned, but after his release in 1980, he became the Deputy Mayor of Yantai. In July 1990, the PLA Central Military Commission restored Zhang's position and allowed him to retire with a state pension.

Zhang died on 26 April 2023 in Beijing, at the age of 96.

== Claims ==
Number	Date	Type	note
1	1951.10.16	F-86	
3	1952.2.10	F-86 two aircraft	common achievement
4	unknown	F-86	
5	1953.5.26	F-86	common achievement
