= Ningjin =

Ningjin may refer to the following places in China:

- Ningjin County, Hebei (宁晋县)
- Ningjin County, Shandong (宁津县)
- Ningjin Town (宁津镇), town in and seat of Ningjin County, Shandong
