= Changguan =

Chángguān (长官) could refer to the following locations in China:

- Changguan, Anhui, in Linquan County
- Changguan, Hunan, in Yongshun County
- Changguan, Shandong, in Ningjin County
