= John S. Walmsley Jr. =

United States Air Force Medal of Honor recipient

John Springer Walmsley Jr.
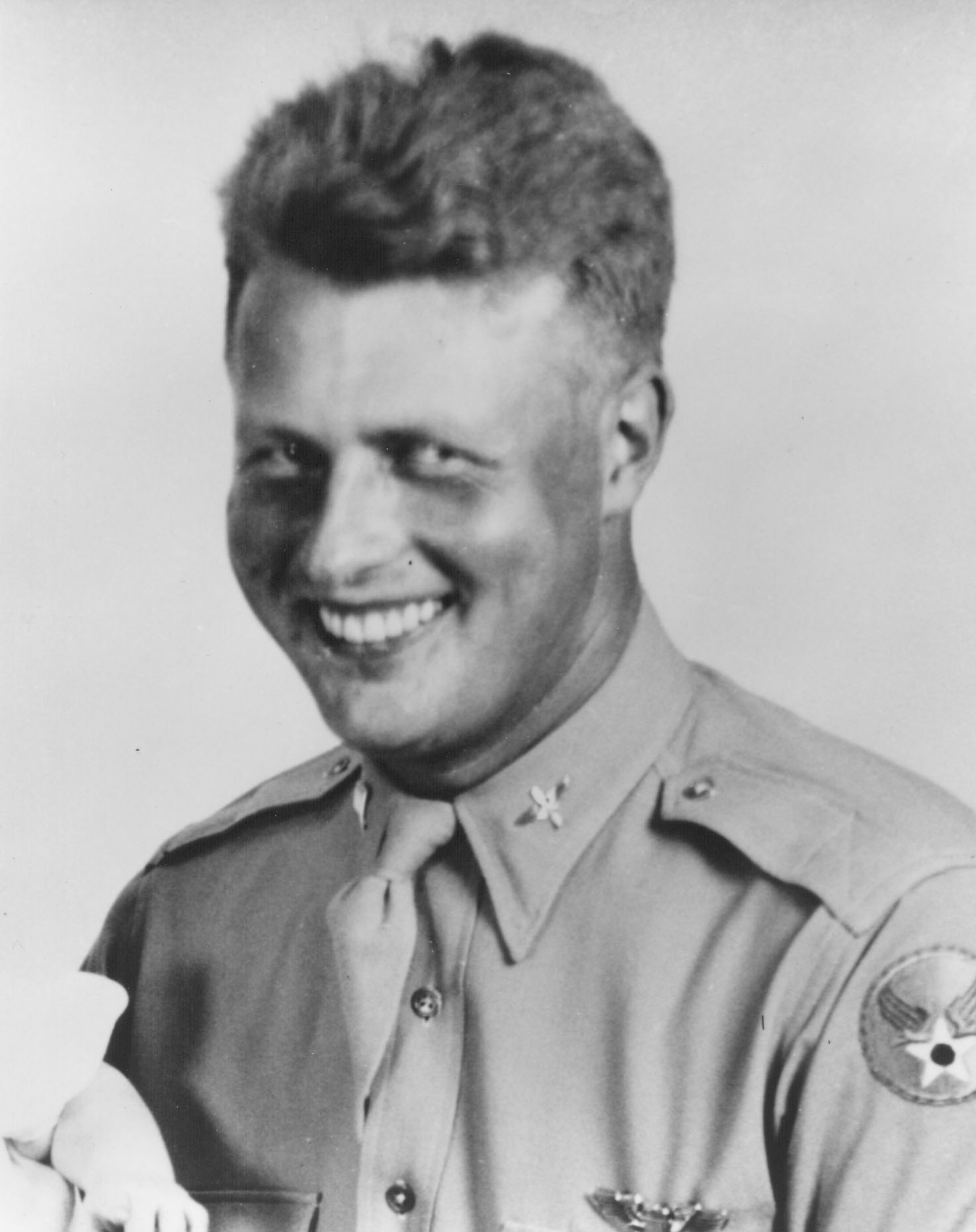
- Born: January 7, 1920; Baltimore, Maryland, United States
- Died: September 14, 1951 (aged 31) near Yangdok, North Korea
- Burial place: Arlington National Cemetery; National Memorial Cemetery of the Pacific
- Military career
- Allegiance: United States
- Branch: United States Army Air Forces; United States Air Force
- Service years: 1944–1951
- Rank: Captain
- Service number: AO-815023
- Unit: 8th Bombardment Squadron
- Conflicts: Korean War; Operation Strangle †
- Awards: Medal of Honor; Distinguished Flying Cross; Purple Heart; Air Medal (2)

John Springer Walmsley Jr. (January 7, 1920 – September 14, 1951) was a bomber pilot in the United States Army Air Forces after World War II and the United States Air Force during the Korean War. Walmsley rose to the rank of captain and posthumously received the Medal of Honor for his heroic actions on September 14, 1951, above Yangdok, North Korea, during a bombing mission.

Born in Baltimore, Maryland, Walmsley graduated from high school in 1936 and attended the University of Maryland.

He joined the Army Air Forces and spent the 1940s as an instructor pilot in the United States and Japan, but did not see combat. He was deployed with the 8th Bombardment Squadron to the Korean War, flying B-26 Invader aircraft. During this time, Walmsley volunteered for a risky bombing campaign, Operation Strangle.

During one of the bombing missions, Walmsley's aircraft spotted a Chinese supply train moving by cover of darkness. He attacked it until he expended his ammunition and called for backup. He then used a spotlight on his aircraft to illuminate the train for subsequent attacks, exposing himself and his crew to intense anti-aircraft fire, which he did not avoid. The mission resulted in the successful destruction of the train, and Walmsley was killed when his heavily damaged aircraft crashed.

== Early life and career ==
Walmsley was born on January 7, 1920, in Baltimore, Maryland. He entered service from the city, as well, joining the United States Army Air Forces in 1944. Walmsley served mainly as a flying instructor during World War II, never seeing combat. Walmsley was then transferred to Japan in 1946 as part of the post-war occupation of that country. There, he flew bomber aircraft from 1946 to 1949. After this, he attended Air Tactical School, graduating in July 1949.

== Korean War ==
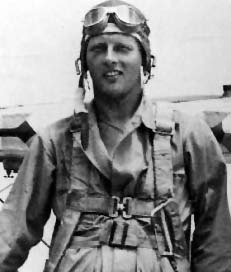
Walmsley in Korea, 1951

In June 1951, Walmsley was assigned to the 8th Bombardment Squadron, 3rd Bombardment Wing, Fifth United States Air Force which flew the Douglas B-26 Invader in Korea during the Korean War. During this time, he was described as "cheerful and popular". During the early phase of the war, missions included fairly simple bombing runs with 260 pounds (120 kg) fragmentation bombs and .50 caliber machine guns. In the summer of 1951, the two sides of the conflict appeared to be reaching a truce one year after the war began. However, as the negotiations continued, North Korean and Chinese troops began moving supplies to the front lines while negotiations were taking place. The move caused United Nations (UN) troops to counter with "Operation Strangle", a new interdiction campaign designed to attack supply lines using arclights, bright lamps attached to the bottom of the aircraft, which would spot truck convoys moving at night. The arclights, with an estimated 80 million candlepower, would easily illuminate supply trains but also expose the UN aircraft to antiaircraft fire. As such, North Korean and Chinese trains were heavily equipped with such guns, and the valleys through which they traveled were heavily fortified with anti-air capability. Walmsley was one of the first pilots to volunteer for the dangerous mission.

By September 1951, Walmsley had been promoted to captain and had flown 20 missions using the arclights. At 55 or 60 missions, the "tour" would have been complete using the risky weapons. A September 12 raid was extremely successful; in it, Walmsley's B-26 attacked a convoy with 500 pounds (230 kg) bombs, destroying or damaging 16 trucks, and forcing many of the vehicle drivers off the road. Emboldened by this successful mission, Walmsley opted on September 14 to bring his bomber named "Skillful 13" (tail number 44-34314), to a mission alone in North Korea.

=== Medal of Honor action and death ===
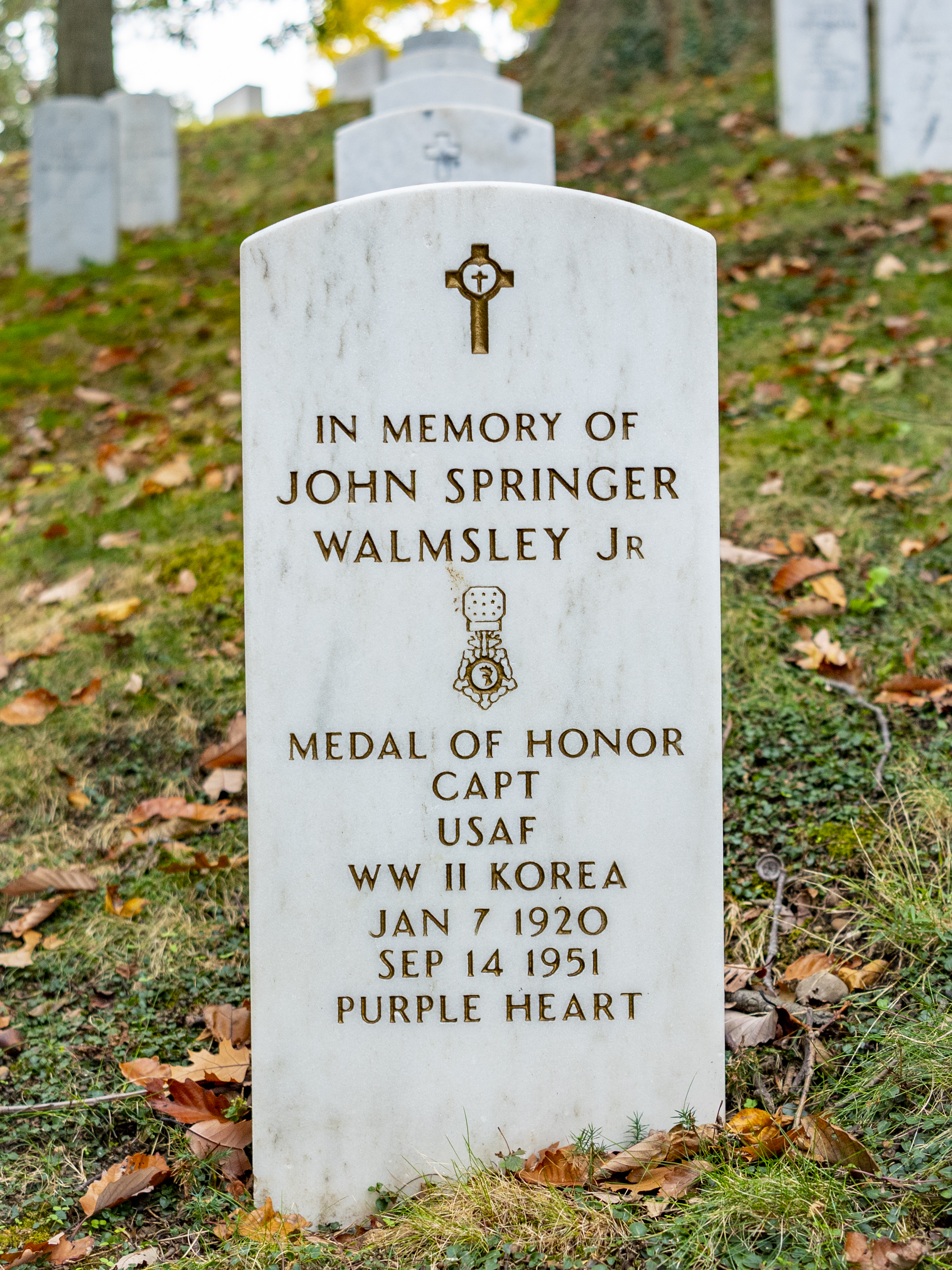
Memorial marker for United States Air Force Captain John Walmsley Jr. in Section MF of Arlington National Cemetery

On September 14 Walmsley's aircraft, Skillful 13, launched from Kunsan alone on a mission to search for truck convoys in North Korea. The aircraft was crewed by Walmsley as well as bombardier/navigator Second Lieutenant William D. Mulkins, photomapper Captain Philip W. Browning, and air gunner Master Sergeant George Morar. As the aircraft neared Yangdok, 100 miles (160 km) behind North Korean lines, the crew spotted an armed locomotive hauling supplies south in the middle of the night. Walmsley immediately had his crew attack the locomotive. They expended their complement of bombs in striking the locomotive, damaging it but not stopping it. Walmsley then called in another B-26 Invader from Kunsan, and upon its arrival volunteered to illuminate the locomotive with his aircraft's arclight. Walmsley's aircraft passed over the locomotive three times, illuminating it but, taking antiaircraft fire in the process from both the train itself and emplacements along the rail line, damaging the aircraft. Walmsley's actions not only illuminated the train but also allowed his aircraft to absorb most of its fire, sparing the other aircraft from attack. He did not take any evasive action against the North Korean anti-aircraft fire so as to keep the train illuminated for the other American aircraft.

After the third pass, the train was destroyed by the combined firepower of the two bombers, together with its cargo. However, Walmsley's aircraft was severely damaged. Its wings began trailing fuel, which ignited. Walmsley's aircraft caught fire, and proceeded about 2 miles (3.2 km), fighting to maintain altitude before finally crashing into the ground in a mountainous region, killing Walmsley, Mulkins and Browning, and severely injuring Morar. As the lone survivor of the crash, Morar was captured and spent the remainder of the war in a prison camp, though he survived. Walmsley was declared missing in action after the mission, and his status was listed as "presumed dead" after the end of the war.

Walmsley's crew each received a Distinguished Flying Cross for extraordinary heroism. Walmsley however, was awarded the Medal of Honor posthumously on June 12, 1954. The medal was presented to his widow at Bolling Air Force Base in Washington, D.C. Four weeks after the mission, the arclights and Operation Strangle were abandoned, as leaders felt the risks and casualties of the operation outweighed the benefits.

== Medal of Honor citation ==
Walmsley was one of four U.S. Air Force members to be awarded the Medal of Honor in the Korean War. All four were pilots who were killed in action. They were the only members of the U.S. Air Force to receive the Army version of the medal (the USAF version was first awarded during the Vietnam War). His Medal of Honor citation reads:

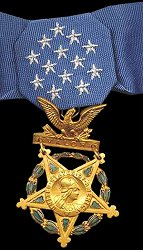
medal of Honor

Rank and organization: Captain, U.S. Air Force, 8th Bombardment Squadron, 3rd Bombardment Group

Place and date: Near Yangdok, Korea, September 14, 1951
Entered service at: Baltimore, Maryland Born: January 7, 1920, Baltimore, Maryland
Citation:
Capt. Walmsley, distinguished himself by conspicuous gallantry and intrepidity at the risk of his life above and beyond the call of duty. While flying a B-26 aircraft on a night combat mission with the objective of developing new tactics, Capt. Walmsley sighted an enemy supply train which had been assigned top priority as a target of opportunity. He immediately attacked, producing a strike which disabled the train, and, when his ammunition was expended, radioed for friendly aircraft in the area to complete destruction of the target. Employing the searchlight mounted on his aircraft, he guided another B-26 aircraft to the target area, meanwhile constantly exposing himself to enemy fire. Directing an incoming B-26 pilot, he twice boldly aligned himself with the target, his searchlight illuminating the area, in a determined effort to give the attacking aircraft full visibility. As the friendly aircraft prepared for the attack, Capt. Walmsley descended into the valley in a low level run over the target with searchlight blazing, selflessly exposing himself to vicious enemy antiaircraft fire. In his determination to inflict maximum damage on the enemy, he refused to employ evasive tactics and valiantly pressed forward straight through an intense barrage, thus insuring complete destruction of the enemy's vitally needed war cargo. While he courageously pressed his attack Capt. Walmsley's plane was hit and crashed into the surrounding mountains, exploding upon impact. His heroic initiative and daring aggressiveness in completing this important mission in the face of overwhelming opposition and at the risk of his life, reflects the highest credit upon himself and the U.S. Air Force.

== Awards and Decorations ==
Walmsley's military decorations and awards include:

Badge	USAF Pilot Badge		
1st row	Medal of Honor		
2nd row	Distinguished Flying Cross	Purple Heart	Air Medal with 1 Oak leaf cluster
3rd row	American Campaign Medal	World War II Victory Medal	Army of Occupation Medal with 'Japan' clasp
4th row	National Defense Service Medal	Korean Service Medal with 3 Campaign stars	Air Force Longevity Service Ribbon with 1 Oak leaf cluster
5th row	Korean Presidential Unit Citation	United Nations Service Medal Korea	Korean War Service Medal Retroactively Awarded, 2003

== See also ==
- List of Medal of Honor recipients
- List of Korean War Medal of Honor recipients
- George A. Davis Jr., USAF-MOH
- Charles J. Loring Jr., USAF-MOH
- Louis J. Sebille, USAF-MOH
