= Louis J. Sebille =

United States Air Force Medal of Honor recipient

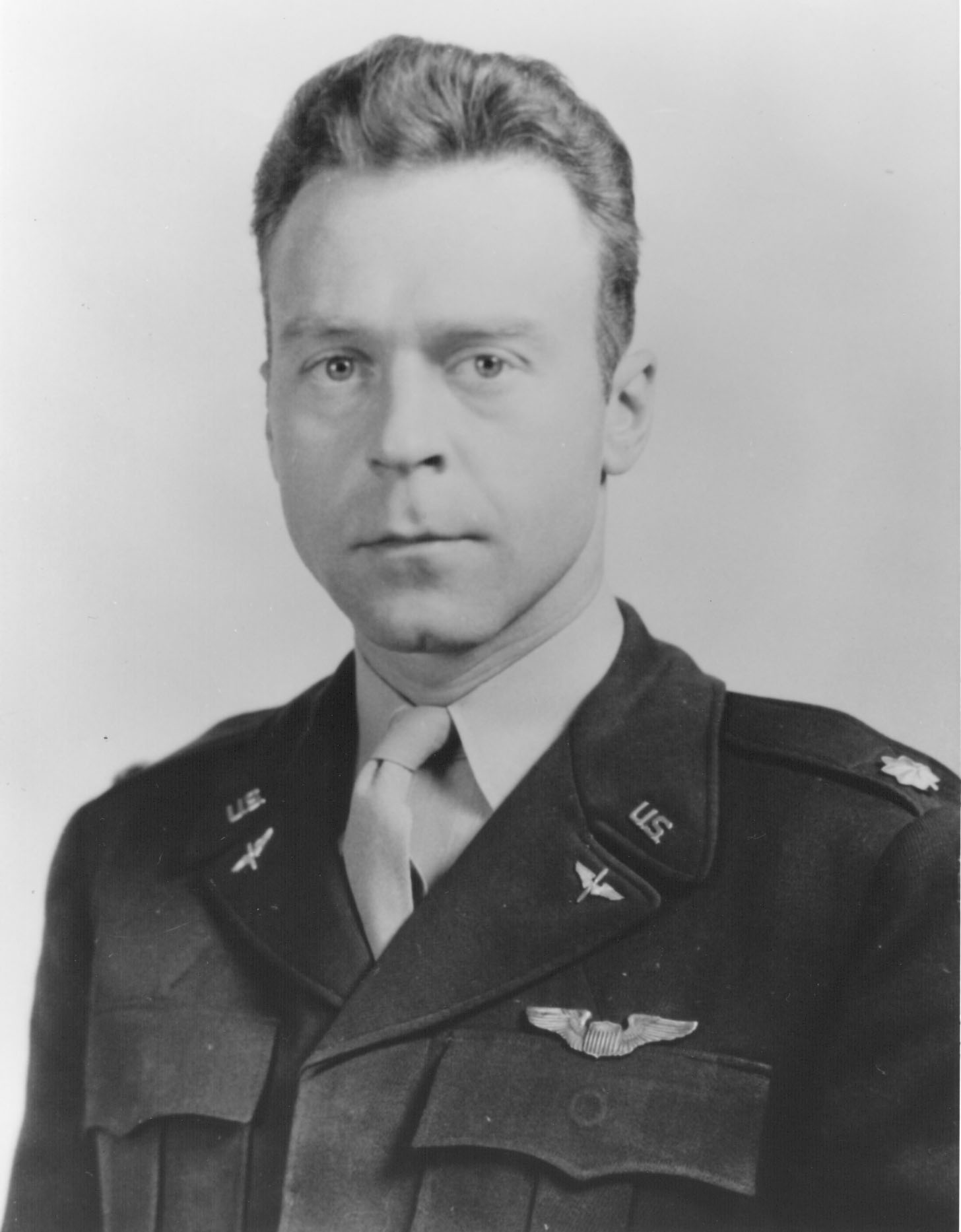
- Born: November 21, 1915; Harbor Beach, Michigan, U.S.
- Died: August 5, 1950 (aged 34) near Hamchang-eup, Pusan Perimeter, Korea
- Military career
- Allegiance: United States
- Branch: United States Army Air Forces; United States Air Force
- Service years: 1942–1945; 1946–1950
- Rank: Major
- Nickname: "Lou"
- Service number: O-662678 (USAAF); 6663A (USAF)
- Unit: 450th Bombardment Squadron
- Commands: 67th Fighter-Bomber Squadron
- Conflicts: World War II; European air campaign; Korean War; Battle of Pusan Perimeter; Battle of Taegu †
- Awards: Medal of Honor; Distinguished Flying Cross (2); Purple Heart; Air Medal (12)

Louis Joseph "Lou" Sebille (November 21, 1915 – August 5, 1950) was a fighter pilot in the United States Army Air Forces during World War II and later the United States Air Force during the Korean War. He rose to the rank of major and was posthumously awarded the Medal of Honor for his actions on August 5, 1950, in South Korea during the Battle of the Pusan Perimeter.

Born in Michigan, Sebille worked as a master of ceremonies in Chicago, Illinois, before joining the United States Army Air Corps shortly after the attack on Pearl Harbor on December 7, 1941. Sebille flew Martin B-26 Marauder bombers over Europe from 1943 to 1945. He flew 68 combat missions and accrued more than 3,000 hours of flying time. Sebille briefly became a commercial airline pilot after the war before he was offered a commission as a first lieutenant and reentered the service in July 1946.

Sebille commanded the 67th Fighter-Bomber Squadron at the outbreak of the Korean War, flying P-51 Mustangs in close air support and air strike missions. On August 5, 1950, he attacked a North Korean armored column advancing on United Nations military units. Though his aircraft was heavily damaged and he was wounded during his first pass over the column, he turned his plane around and deliberately crashed into the convoy at the cost of his life.

== Early life and education ==
Sebille was born on November 21, 1915, in Harbor Beach, Michigan. He attended Wayne State University in Detroit, Michigan. After his graduation from the university in the 1930s he moved to Chicago, Illinois, where he worked as a Master of Ceremonies in several Chicago nightclubs under the nickname "Lou Reynolds." He was described as "a handsome glib master of ceremonies who used to wow the customers with his own parody of My Blue Heaven." Sebille married and his wife gave birth to a son in December 1949.

== Career ==
=== World War II ===
Sebille enlisted in the United States Army Air Corps two weeks after the attack on Pearl Harbor by the Empire of Japan. He began flight training in January 1942, in spite of being two months older than the cutoff age of 26, as the desperate need for pilots combined with Sebille's skills as a pilot allowed him to receive a waiver of the age restriction. During that time he was described as an outstanding pilot and leader, and his maturity was helpful for the younger trainees. After completing flight training, Sebille was commissioned as a second lieutenant and assigned to the 450th Bombardment Squadron, 322nd Bombardment Group, 3rd Bombardment Wing, at MacDill Field, Florida. Sebille flew Martin B-26 Marauder aircraft.

Deployed to England in January 1943, Sebille flew bombing missions in the European theatre. The 322nd Bombardment Group, the first unit to fly the B-26 Marauder, was sent on its first mission on May 14, a low-altitude attack on an electrical power plant in the German-occupied Netherlands. The mission was Sebille's first sortie, and the group suffered one plane lost and 10 damaged. Sebille advanced to flight leader and then was promoted to squadron operations officer with the temporary rank of major. By the end of the war, Sebille had flown 68 combat missions with 245 combat hours. He was awarded two Distinguished Flying Crosses and twelve Air Medals. His unit returned to the United States in March 1945.

After the end of the war, Sebille left active duty with the Air Force and began work as a commercial airline pilot. However he returned to the Air Force in July 1946 after he was offered a commission as a first lieutenant. He held several positions, first as a staff officer with the Ninth United States Air Force headquarters at Biggs Army Airfield at Fort Bliss, Texas. Shortly thereafter, Sebille was assigned as a North American P-51 Mustang and Lockheed P-80 Shooting Star instructor pilot, teaching other pilots how to transition from propeller-driven fighter aircraft to newer jets. Sebille attended Air Tactical School at Tyndall Field, Florida. He was assigned to Clark Air Base in the Philippines in 1948. During this time, he flew an P-51D named Nancy III (tail number 44-74112). In November 1948, Sebille was once again promoted to major and made the commanding officer of the 67th Fighter-Bomber Squadron, 18th Fighter-Bomber Wing, a component of the Fifth United States Air Force stationed in Japan for post-World War II occupation duties. In November 1949, the squadron began receiving new P-80 Shooting Stars but continued to fly a mix of P-80 and P-51 aircraft. Eventually, the squadron transitioned entirely to P-80s, then back to P-51s. During this time, Sebille frequently discussed fighting and death, including sentiments supporting suicide attack, at one point saying "If you have to die, then take some of the enemy with you." During this time he worked mostly administrative duty as the squadron absorbed new aircraft and pilots in Japan.

=== Korean War ===
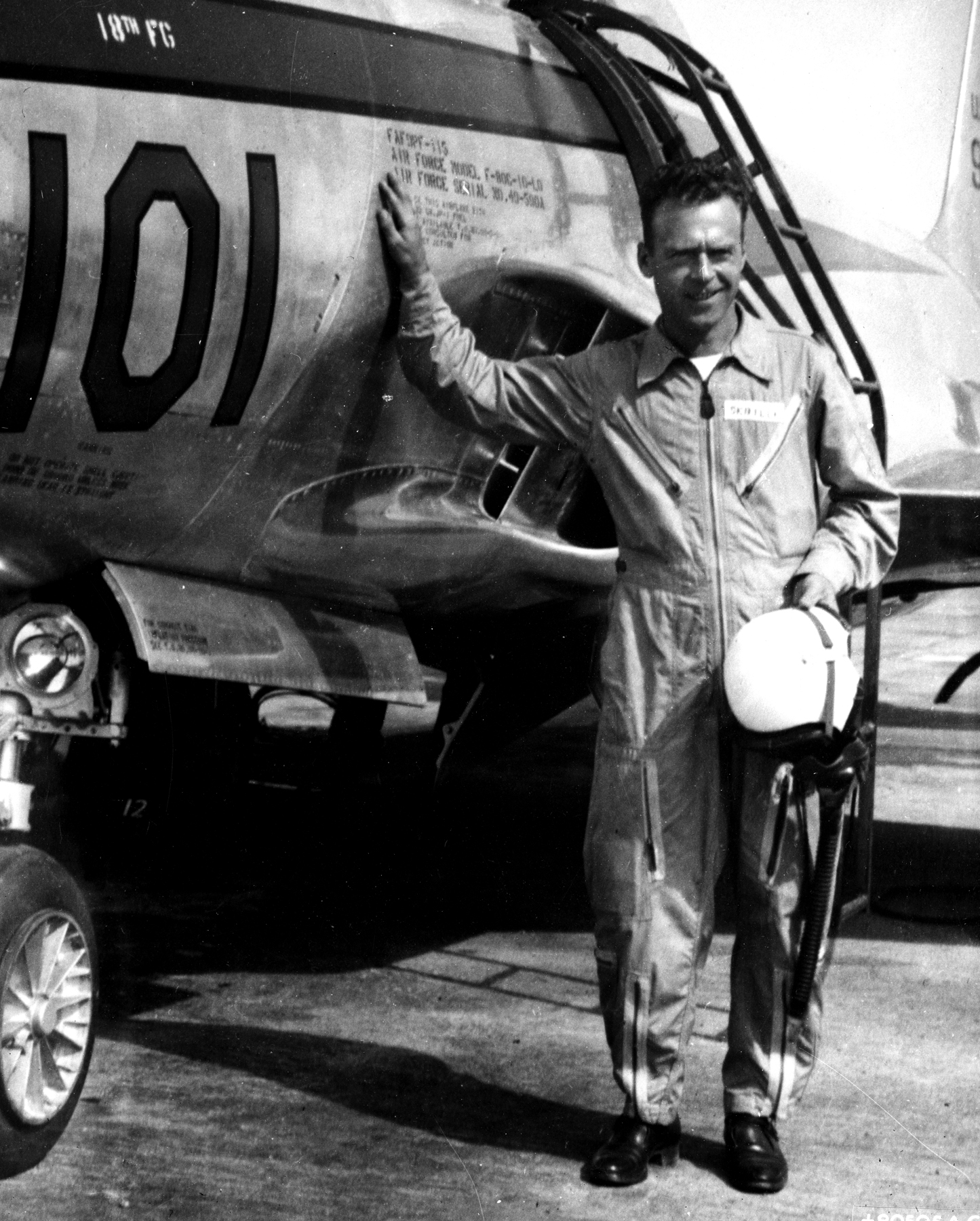
Louis Sebille in Korea.

With the outbreak of the Korean War on June 25, 1950, the United Nations voted to send troops into South Korea to aid it against the North Korean Army to prevent the country from collapsing. Sebille's unit was among those sent to assist the UN ground forces operating in Korea. By the end of July, the US had shipped a large number of aircraft of all types to Korea. On July 30, the Far East Air Forces had 890 planes—626 F-80s and 264 F-51s (previously designated P-51 until 1947)—with 525 of them in units and available and ready for combat.

Early in the war, these aircraft were used primarily to conduct raids and gather intelligence on North Korean ground targets, focused on disrupting supplies to the front lines. However, as soon as UN forces retreated to the Pusan Perimeter following the Battle of Taejon, the Naval aircraft were immediately reassigned to close-air support and airstrikes against North Korean ground troops on the front. These were significantly more risky missions, and the aircraft suffered much higher losses due to North Korean ground fire. On August 1, Sebille and his squadron moved to Ashiya Air Field and began conducting ground-support missions. By August 5, Sebille had accrued over 3,000 hours of flying time over the course of his career. The 67th Fighter-Bomber Squadron operated primarily out of Ashiya, but also used airfields at Taegu and Pusan.

==== Medal of Honor action and death ====
At the beginning of the Battle of the Pusan Perimeter, on the night of August 4 North Korean troops established a bridgehead across the Naktong River and were using it to advance across the river and attack Taegu, where the UN's Eighth United States Army was headquartered in defense of the perimeter. On August 5, a T-6 Mosquito forward air controller spotted a North Korea column advancing through the village of Hamchang-eup. Sebille was ordered to lead a flight of three F-51s on an airstrike against them. Sebille flew an F-51 (tail number 44-74394) loaded with two 500 pounds (230 kg) bombs, six rockets, and six M2 Browning .50 caliber machine guns. He and his wingmen, Captain Martin Johnson and Lieutenant Charles Morehouse, approached the village at an altitude of 5,000 feet (1,500 m) and spotted a North Korean armored column crossing a shallow section of the river. Sebille positioned himself for a medium-angle dive bomb run, planning to drop both of his bombs on his first attack. Diving, he held steady until about 2,500 feet (760 m). When he spotted a target column of trucks, artillery guns and armored cars, led by a North Korean Armored Personnel Carrier, he hit the bomb release button on his control stick, and then made a sharp pull-up to the left to stay away from his bomb blast. However, only one of his bombs released, and the 500 pounds (230 kg) of unbalanced weight under his left wing may have contributed to his near miss.

North Korean flak struck Sebille's F-51 as he turned to make a second run, heavily damaging the aircraft and it began trailing smoke and glycol coolant. Sebille had intended to release his second bomb, but he radioed Johnson that he had been hit and injured, probably fatally. Johnson radioed back Sebille should try to head for an American emergency landing strip in Taegu a short distance away, but Sebille responded with his last known words, "No, I'll never make it. I'm going back and get that bastard (sic)". He dove straight toward the APC that was his target. He fired his six rockets in salvo, then he deliberately dove his airplane and the remaining bomb straight into the target, firing his six machine guns. His plane sustained even heavier damage, and he crashed into the North Korean convoy, killing a large contingent of North Korean ground troops and destroying vehicles.

Upon hearing reports of Sebille's death, commanders in Korea did not think highly of Sebille's act, likening it to a kamikaze action. In spite of reluctance, Lieutenant Donald Bolt, the squadron's assistant awards officer, forwarded a citation of the event to Washington, D.C., where Sebille would be evaluated for the Medal of Honor. Shortly after the incident, both Bolt and Sebille's second-in-command, Captain Robert Howell, were killed in separate combat engagements. A short obituary for Sebille appeared in Time Magazine after his death. The United States Air Force Academy also created a memorial to Sebille in Harmon Hall, the academy's administration building.

== Awards and decorations ==
Sebille's military decorations and awards include:

USAF Senior Pilot Badge
Medal of Honor	Distinguished Flying Cross w/ 1 bronze oak leaf cluster	Purple Heart
Air Medal w/ 2 silver and 1 bronze oak leaf clusters	Air Force Presidential Unit Citation	American Campaign Medal
European-African-Middle Eastern Campaign Medal w/ 1 silver campaign star	World War II Victory Medal	Army of Occupation Medal w/ 'Japan' clasp
National Defense Service Medal	Korean Service Medal w/ 1 bronze campaign star	Air Force Longevity Service Award w/ 1 bronze oak leaf cluster
Republic of Korea Presidential Unit Citation	United Nations Korea Medal	Republic of Korea War Service Medal

=== Medal of Honor citation ===
Sebille was posthumously presented the Medal of Honor in a ceremony at March Air Force Base in Riverside County, California, on August 24, 1951. Air Force Chief of Staff General Hoyt Vandenberg presented the medal for him to his widowed wife and their son, who was 19 months old at the time. The ceremony was also attended by his former wingman in Korea, Martin Johnson, who made a speech calling Sebille "a remarkable friend, a fine commander and a very brave man."

Sebille was the first person in the U.S. Air Force to be awarded the Medal of Honor since the branch's beginning in 1947, and the 31st MOH recipient of the Korea War. The four U.S. Air Force members including Sebrille who received the medal in that war were pilots who were killed in action. They were the only USAF members to receive the Army version of the medal (the Air Force version was first awarded during the Vietnam War).

His Medal of Honor citation reads:

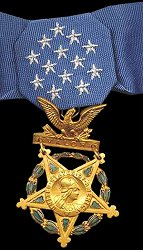
Medal of Honor

Rank and organization: Major, U.S. Air Force, 67th Fighter-Bomber Squadron, 18th Fighter-Bomber Group, 5th Air Force.

Place and date: Near Hanchang, Korea, August 5, 1950.
Entered service at: Chicago, Ill. Born: November 21, 1915, Harbor Beach. Mich.
Citation:
Maj. Sebille, distinguished himself by conspicuous gallantry and intrepidity at the risk of his life above and beyond the call of duty. During an attack on a camouflaged area containing a concentration of enemy troops, artillery, and armored vehicles, Maj. Sebille's F-51 aircraft was severely damaged by antiaircraft fire. Although fully cognizant of the short period he could remain airborne, he deliberately ignored the possibility of survival by abandoning the aircraft or by crash landing, and continued his attack against the enemy forces threatening the security of friendly ground troops. In his determination to inflict maximum damage upon the enemy, Maj. Sebille again exposed himself to the intense fire of enemy gun batteries and dived on the target to his death. The superior leadership, daring, and selfless devotion to duty which he displayed in the execution of an extremely dangerous mission were an inspiration to both his subordinates and superiors and reflect the highest credit upon himself, the U.S. Air Force, and the armed forces of the United Nations.

== See also ==
- List of Medal of Honor recipients
- List of Korean War Medal of Honor recipients
- George A. Davis, Jr.
- Charles J. Loring, Jr.
- John S. Walmsley, Jr.

== Citations ==
=== Sources ===
- Appleman, Roy E. (1998), South to the Naktong, North to the Yalu: United States Army in the Korean War, Department of the Army, ISBN 978-0-16-001918-0, archived from the original on 2014-02-07
- Biteman, Duane E. (1998), Air Force Fifty, Turner Publishing Company, ISBN 978-1-56311-409-0
- Bruning, John R. (1999), Crimson Sky: The Air Battle for Korea, Brassey's, ISBN 978-1-57488-841-6
- Dorr, Robert F. (2003), Korean Air War, Zenith Publishing, ISBN 978-0-7603-1511-8
- Ecker, Richard E. (2004), Battles of the Korean War: A Chronology, with Unit-by-Unit United States Casualty Figures & Medal of Honor Citations, McFarland & Company, ISBN 978-0-7864-1980-7
- Tillman, Barrett (2002), Above and Beyond: The Aviation Medals of Honor, Washington, D.C.: Smithsonian Institution, ISBN 978-1-58834-056-6
