= Operation Strangle =

Operation Strangle may refer to:

- Operation Strangle (World War II)
- Operation Strangle (Korean War)
