= Charles J. Loring Jr. =

United States Air Force Medal of Honor recipient

Charles Joseph Loring Jr.
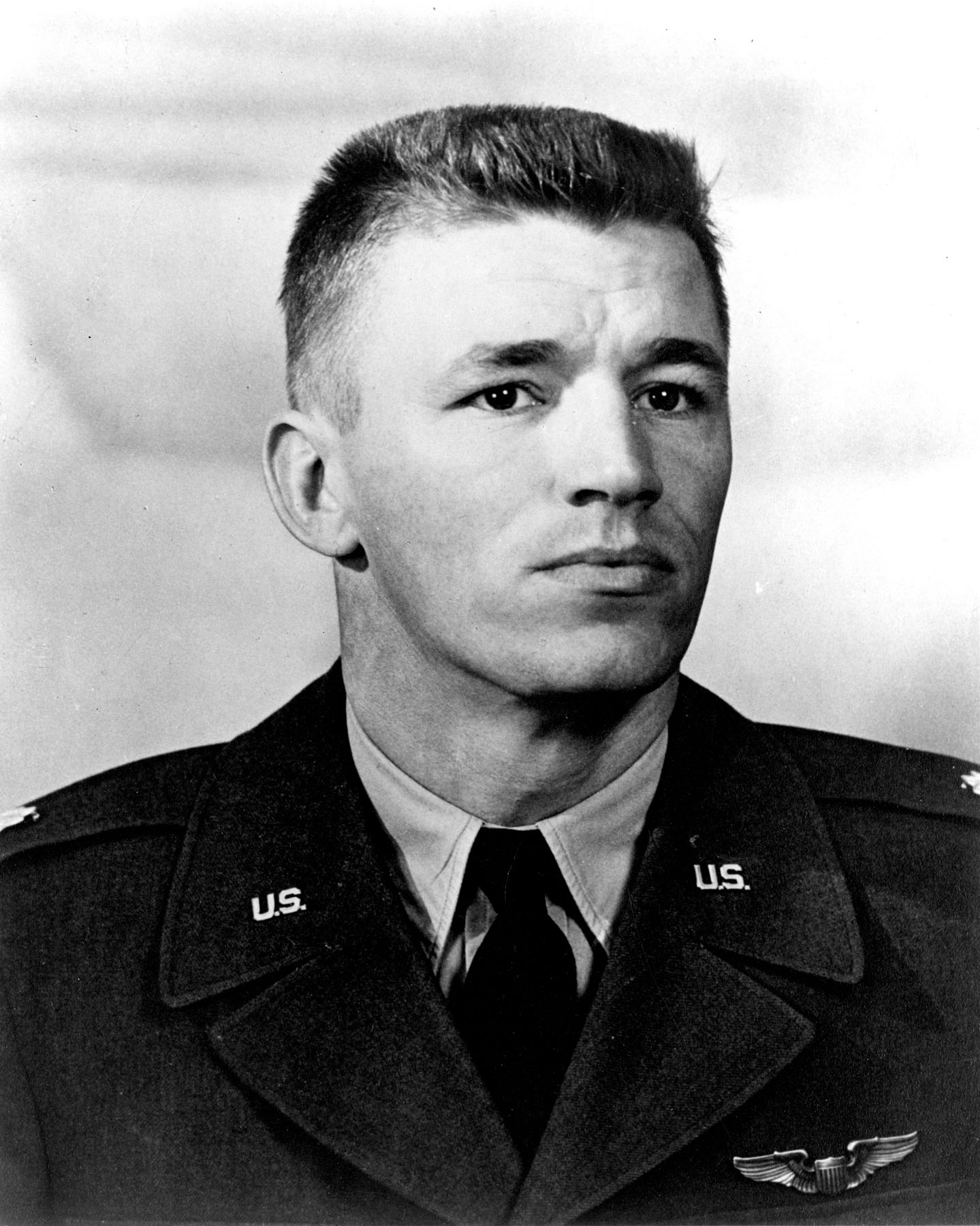
- Loring in c. 1950
- Born: October 2, 1918; Portland, Maine, United States
- Died: November 22, 1952 (aged 34); Kimnhwa, Korea
- Burial place: Arlington National Cemetery; National Memorial Cemetery of the Pacific
- Military career
- Allegiance: United States
- Branch: United States Army Air Forces; United States Air Force
- Service years: 1942–1952
- Rank: Major
- Service number: O-798155 (USAAF); 13008A (USAF)
- Units: 22nd Fighter Squadron; 36th Fighter-Bomber Squadron; 80th Fighter-Bomber Squadron
- Conflicts: World War II; Korean War †
- Awards: Medal of Honor; Distinguished Flying Cross; Purple Heart (2); Air Medal (12); Taegeuk Order of Military Merit (South Korea)

Charles Joseph Loring Jr. (October 2, 1918 – November 22, 1952) was a fighter pilot in the United States Army Air Forces in World War II, and later in the United States Air Force in the Korean War. Loring rose to the rank of major and posthumously received the Medal of Honor for his heroic actions on November 22, 1952, above Kunwha, Korea, during a close air support mission.

Born in Portland, Maine, Loring joined the United States Army in 1942 and was quickly selected to undergo pilot training. He spent several months stationed in Puerto Rico before being transferred to duty in the United Kingdom in 1944. There, he flew 55 combat missions in P-47 Thunderbolt aircraft before being shot down and spending six months as a Nazi German prisoner of war. By the outset of the Korean War, Loring was working in an administrative role in the United States, but by 1952 had been transferred to combat duty in Korea.

During a patrol on November 22, 1952, Loring was leading a flight of F-80 Shooting Stars of the 80th Fighter-Bomber Squadron in an attack on a Chinese artillery position. During the run, his aircraft was struck by intense and accurate anti aircraft fire. Rather than abort the mission, Loring continued his diving run, aiming his disabled aircraft at the position and obliterating it, killing himself in the process. After his death, Loring was awarded the Medal of Honor and made the namesake of Loring Air Force Base in Limestone, Maine.

== Early life ==
Charles Loring Jr. was born on October 2, 1918, in Portland, Maine to Charles J. Loring Sr. and Irene Cronin Loring. He lived in the town throughout his early life, attending Cheverus High School, and graduating in 1937.

== Military service ==
=== World War II ===
After the United States entry into World War II, Loring enlisted in the U.S. Army at Portland, at age 23 in March 1942, and as a private joined the Army Air Corps. By May 1942, he had been selected as an aviation cadet at the USAAC pre-flight school at Maxwell Air Force Base in Montgomery, Alabama. Loring completed Primary flight training at Douglas, GA, Basic at Greenville, Mississippi and Advanced at Napier Field, Alabama. After graduating, Loring was commissioned as a second lieutenant in the Army Reserve with a pilot rating.

In December 1942, Loring was assigned to the 22nd Fighter Squadron, 36th Fighter Group, Ninth Air Force at Losey Army Airfield in Juana Díaz, Puerto Rico. The unit flew anti-submarine patrols as part of a force defending the Panama Canal and Caribbean Sea areas. During this time, Loring primarily flew P-39 Airacobra and P-40 Warhawk fighter and ground attack aircraft. After a stint of this duty, the 36th Fighter Group returned to the United States to Charleston Army Airfield in Charleston, South Carolina. There, Loring and the other pilots of the unit trained with the P-47 Thunderbolt aircraft. It briefly moved to Scribner, Nebraska as part of this flight training.

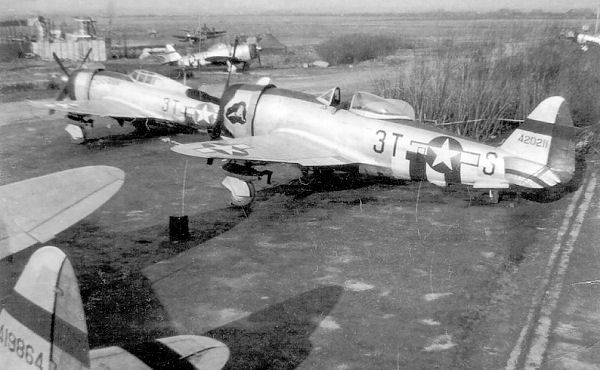
A group of P-47 Thunderbolts of the 22nd Fighter Squadron at Le Culot, Belgium in late 1944, as evidenced by the modified fuselage invasion stripes (removed from fuselage & wing upper surfaces). Loring was flying aircraft 44-19864 (left) when he was shot down over Belgium and made a prisoner of war.

In April 1944, Loring and the group moved to England to fly missions against Nazi German targets. The 36th Fighter Group flew out of RAF Kingsnorth in Kent, England flying reconnaissance, fighter escort and interdiction missions. The missions involved striking military strongpoints in northern Europe in preparation for Operation Overlord. Following the success of Overlord, Loring continued to fly air support missions for the remainder of the conflict. By December, he had flown 55 combat missions. He had been awarded a Distinguished Flying Cross for his actions under fire on June 12, 1944, that destroyed ten enemy armored vehicles in the area of Coutances, France, while on a dive-bombing mission.

==== Prisoner of war ====
On December 24, 1944, Loring was flying a mission over Belgium when his P-47 was hit by flak artillery as he strafed ground targets. Loring was subsequently captured and spent six months as a German prisoner of war. Loring was liberated on May 5, 1945, three days before the end of the war on May 8, 1945 (V-E Day).

After World War II, Loring remained in the U.S. Army Air Corps. Promoted to captain, he served in a number of administrative roles in the post-war Air Corps, which became the United States Air Force in 1947.

=== Korean War ===
By the outbreak of the Korean War in June 1950, Loring was attached to Air University and was not immediately sent to Korea for combat duty. On February 3, 1952, Loring was reassigned to the 2353rd Personnel Processing Squadron at Camp Stoneman in Pittsburg, California. This unit was quickly moved to South Korea, where it was assigned to the 8th Fighter-Bomber Wing, Fifth Air Force, with the assignment of supervising training for replacement pilots before they were moved into combat units. During this time he flew with the 36th Fighter-Bomber Squadron and 80th Fighter-Bomber Squadron, while assisting the new pilots.

In July 1952, Loring transferred to the 36th Fighter-Bomber Squadron full-time, where he served as operations officer. In this role he returned to combat duty, this time as a jet aircraft fighter pilot operating the F-80 Shooting Star. Missions for this unit primarily concerned close air support, air strikes and interdiction missions supporting United Nations Command ground troops in the country. In this role, Loring's unit primarily fought North Korean and Chinese ground targets. By November 22, 1952, Loring had completed 50 combat missions. At that time the ground battle in Korea had developed into a stalemate, with the two sides firmly entrenched along the 38th Parallel. Throughout November, the UN forces had been launching Operation Showdown against two targets: Triangle Hill and Sniper Ridge, northwest of Kunwha, 20 miles (32 km) north of the 38th Parallel. During the battle, the Chinese managed to amass 133 large caliber guns, 24 BM-13 rocket launchers and 47 anti-aircraft guns in the largest Chinese artillery operation during the Korean War, and it posed a serious threat to ground troops of the ROK 2nd Infantry Division operating in the area. The artillery was heavily guarded, forcing the UN forces to use airpower to combat them.

==== Medal of Honor action and death ====
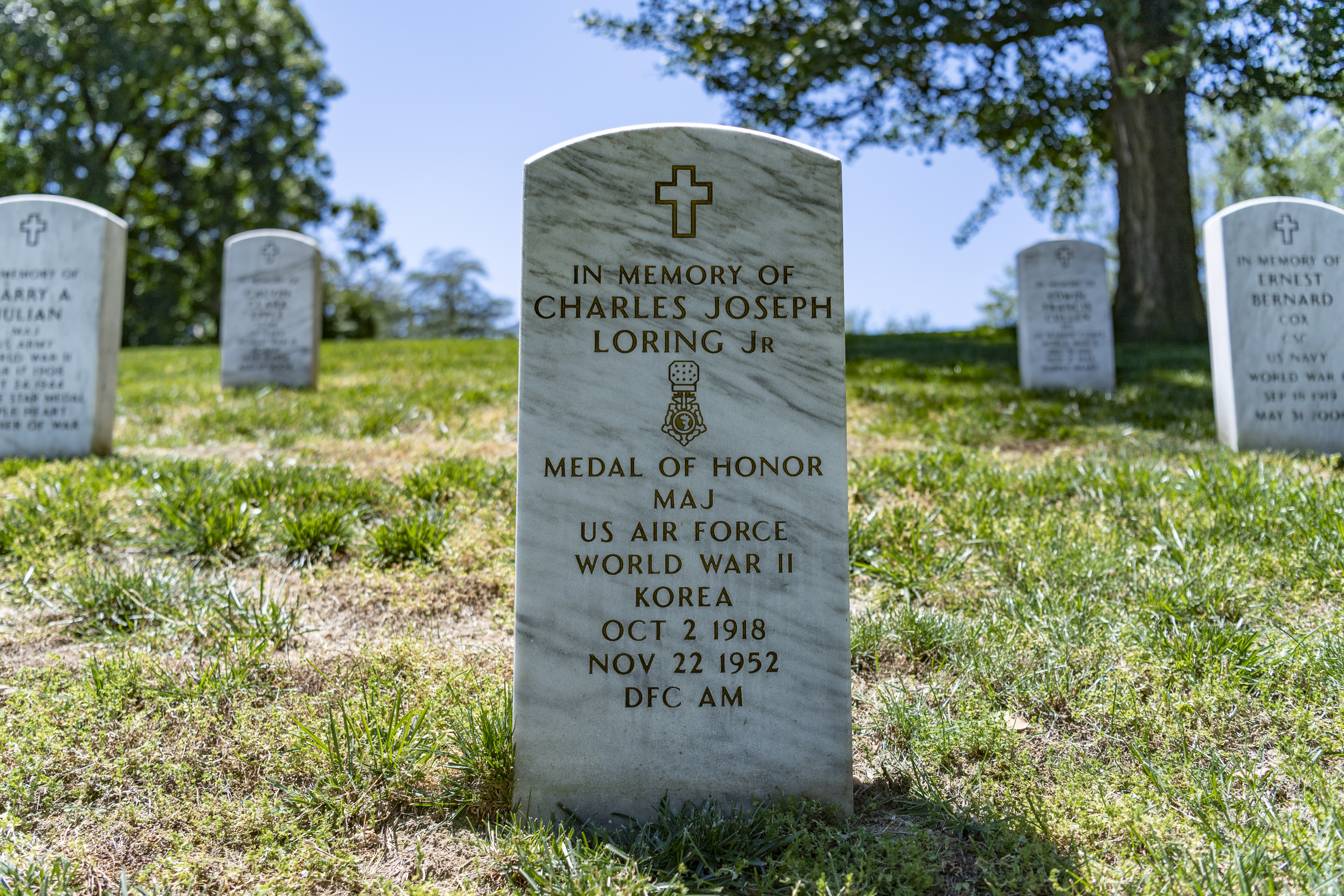
Cenotaph at Arlington National Cemetery

Late in the morning of November 22, 1952, Loring led a flight of four F-80s on patrol over Kunwha. Upon radioing a forward air controller, he was told a T-6 Texan flying over Sniper Ridge had spotted a concentration of artillery near the ridge which was pinning down UN ground troops on the ridge. He was also told the artillery concentration was surrounded by a heavy presence of anti-aircraft guns. Loring ordered the flight to the location, spotting the artillery concentration. Immediately after Loring began his dive bombing run, he was spotted by the anti-aircraft batteries. The Chinese crews operating them were highly skilled, and even at a distance, the batteries fired an extremely accurate barrage which struck Loring's aircraft several times on the nose and fuselage. The fire disabled the aircraft. His wingmen, noting the damage, suggested he abort the bombing mission, as the flight was not far behind the lines and Loring's aircraft could have attempted the return trip. Instead, Loring ceased radio contact, and resumed what appeared to be the standard bombing mission. At 4,000 feet (1,200 m), however, Loring accelerated his aircraft at a 40-degree angle in what appeared to be a controlled maneuver, lining up the Chinese batteries. The other pilots reported they watched, stunned, as Loring dove his damaged aircraft into the battery position. Loring was killed instantly in the impact, but his action resulted in the complete destruction of the battery position.

Loring's remains were never recovered after the crash and he was listed as "Missing in action, presumed dead."

== Honors ==
On May 5, 1954, Loring's widow received a Medal of Honor from President Dwight Eisenhower. At that time, it was also announced that the newly built Air Force Base in Limestone, Maine would be named Loring Air Force Base in his honor.

In 2000, "Loring Memorial Park" was dedicated for Major Loring in Portland, Maine in the Munjoy Hill neighborhood.

Cheverus High School (named in 1924 after the first Roman Catholic bishop of the Boston Diocese) where Loring had graduated from in 1937, created a display in its alumni room dedicated to Major Loring. The display featured replicas of Loring's medals, as well as his high school diploma. The school also created a school award named after him which honors students who have served in the U.S. military.

The Amvets Charles J. Loring Post 25 in Portland, Maine is named after Major Loring.

The combined enlisted/officer club at Kunsan AB, South Korea is named in his honor.

In 1957, the Maine State Legislature designated a portion of the East Deering Expressway as the "Charles J. Loring, Jr. Memorial Highway."

== Medal of Honor citation ==
Loring was one of four U.S. Air Force Medal of Honor recipients of the Korean War. All four were pilots who were killed in action. They were the only U.S. Air Force members to receive the Army version of the medal (the USAF version was first awarded during the Vietnam War). His Medal of Honor citation reads as follows.

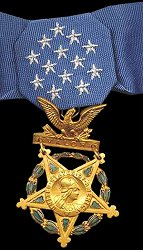
Medal of Honor

Rank and organization: Major, U.S. Air Force, 80th Fighter-Bomber Squadron, 8th Fighter-Bomber Wing, Fifth Air Force

Place and date: Near Sniper Ridge, North Korea, November 22, 1952
Entered service at: Portland, Maine. Born: October 2, 1918, Portland, Maine
Citation:

Maj. Loring distinguished himself by conspicuous gallantry and intrepidity at the risk of his life above and beyond the call of duty. While leading a flight of 4 F-80 type aircraft on a close support mission, Maj. Loring was briefed by a controller to dive-bomb enemy gun positions which were harassing friendly ground troops. After verifying the location of the target, Maj. Loring rolled into his dive bomb run. Throughout the run, extremely accurate ground fire was directed on his aircraft. Disregarding the accuracy and intensity of the ground fire, Maj. Loring aggressively continued to press the attack until his aircraft was hit. At approximately 4,000 feet, he deliberately altered his course and aimed his diving aircraft at active gun emplacements concentrated on a ridge northwest of the briefed target, turned his aircraft 45 degrees to the left, pulled up in a deliberate, controlled maneuver, and elected to sacrifice his life by diving his aircraft directly into the midst of the enemy emplacements. His selfless and heroic action completely destroyed the enemy gun emplacement and eliminated a dangerous threat to United Nations ground forces. Maj. Loring's noble spirit, superlative courage, and conspicuous self-sacrifice in inflicting maximum damage on the enemy exemplified valor of the highest degree and his actions were in keeping with the finest traditions of the U.S. Air Force.

== Awards and Decorations ==
Loring's military awards and decorations include:

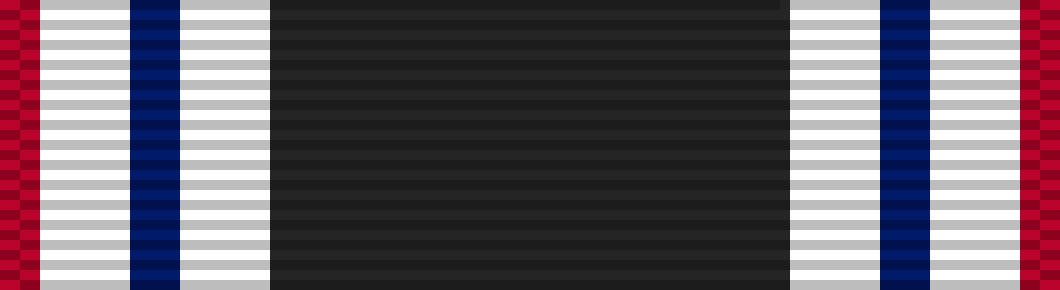

Badge	Senior Pilot Badge		
1st row	Medal of Honor	Distinguished Flying Cross	Purple Heart with 1 Oak leaf cluster
2nd row	Air Medal with 11 Oak leaf clusters	Presidential Unit Citation	Prisoner of War Medal Retroactively Awarded, 1985
3rd row	American Campaign Medal	European-African-Middle Eastern Campaign Medal with 6 Campaign stars	World War II Victory Medal
4th row	National Defense Service Medal	Korean Service Medal with 1 Campaign star	Air Force Longevity Service Ribbon with 1 Oak leaf cluster
3rd row	Korean Presidential Unit Citation	United Nations Service Medal Korea	Korean War Service Medal Retroactively Awarded, 2003

Foreign Awards

Croix De Guerre with Palm	Order of Military Merit Taeguk Cordon Medal

== See also ==
- List of Korean War Medal of Honor recipients
- George A. Davis Jr., USAF-M0H
- Louis J. Sebille, USAF-MOH
- John S. Walmsley Jr., USAF-MOH

== Citations ==
=== Sources ===
- Chinese Military Science Academy (2000), History of War to Resist America and Aid Korea (抗美援朝战争史) (in Chinese), vol. III, Beijing: Chinese Military Science Academy Publishing House, ISBN 7-80137-390-1
- Ecker, Richard E. (2004), Battles of the Korean War: A Chronology, with Unit-by-Unit United States Casualty Figures & Medal of Honor Citations, Jefferson, North Carolina: McFarland & Company, ISBN 978-0-7864-1980-7
- Tillman, Barrett (2002), Above and Beyond: The Aviation Medals of Honor, Washington, D.C.: Smithsonian Institution, ISBN 978-1-58834-056-6
- Zhang, Song Shan (张嵩山) (2010), Decipher Shangganling (解密上甘岭) (in Chinese), Beijing: Beijing Publishing House, ISBN 978-7-200-08113-8
