= Daliu, Shandong =

Daliu 大柳镇
- Town
- Location in Shandong Daliu (China)
- Coordinates: 37°46′05″N 117°05′14″E
- Country: People's Republic of China
- Province: Shandong
- Prefecture-level city: Dezhou
- County: Ningjin
- Elevation: 17 m (56 ft)
- Time zone: UTC+8 (China Standard)
- Postal code: 253416
- Area code: 0534

Daliu (Chinese: 大柳; pinyin: Dàliǔ) is a town in Ningjin County in northwestern Shandong province, China, located about 9 kilometres (5.6 mi) north-northeast of the county seat. As of 2011, it has 50 villages under its administration.

== See also ==
- List of township-level divisions of Shandong
