= Donald E. Adams =

American Korean War flying ace

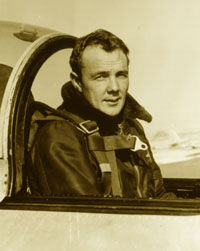
- Donald E. Adams
- Born: February 23, 1921; Caton, New York, U.S.
- Died: August 30, 1952 (aged 31); Detroit, Michigan, U.S. Civilian air crash
- Burial place: Clinton Grove Cemetery
- Military career
- Allegiance: United States
- Branch: United States Army Air Forces; United States Air Force
- Service years: 1942–1952
- Rank: Major
- Conflicts: World War II; Korean War
- Awards: Silver Star; Distinguished Flying Cross; Air Medal (8)

Donald E. Adams (February 23, 1921 – August 30, 1952) was a United States Air Force flying ace during the Korean War.

He was born in Caton, New York. After earning a bachelor's degree from Western Michigan College in 1942, he enlisted in the United States Army Air Forces. He was awarded his pilot's wings and commissioned a second lieutenant on August 30, 1943. He then served as an instructor at Newport, Arkansas until July 1944. In February 1945, however, he joined the 343rd Fighter Squadron of the 55th Fighter Group in the European Theater of World War II. He was credited with two enemy aircraft destroyed on the ground.

He remained in the military after the war, flying F-80 Shooting Star and F-86 Sabre jet fighters as part of the 62d Fighter Squadron of the 56th Fighter Group at Selfridge AFB, Michigan, from July 1947 to October 1951.

As part of the 16th Fighter Interceptor Squadron of the 51st Fighter Interceptor Group in the Korean War, Major Adams was credited with 6.5 enemy aircraft shot down between January and May 1952, making him an ace. He was awarded a Silver Star for leading a squadron of six against 20 "MIG type aircraft" on May 3 and downing two of the enemy.

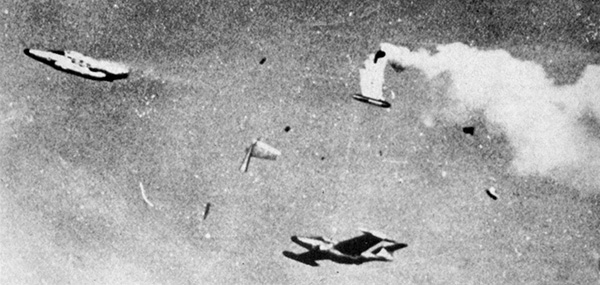
Adams Northrop F-89 Scorpion disintegrating at Detroit, Michigan in 1952

Transferred back to the United States, Adams was killed in a Detroit airshow crash on August 30, 1952, making him one of only two Korean War flying aces to die before the end of the war, the other being George A. Davis, Jr. Major Adams and his radar operator died after a wing tore off their Northrop F-89 Scorpion.

== See also ==
- List of Korean War flying aces
