= George Andrew Davis Jr. =

American fighter pilot (1920–1952)

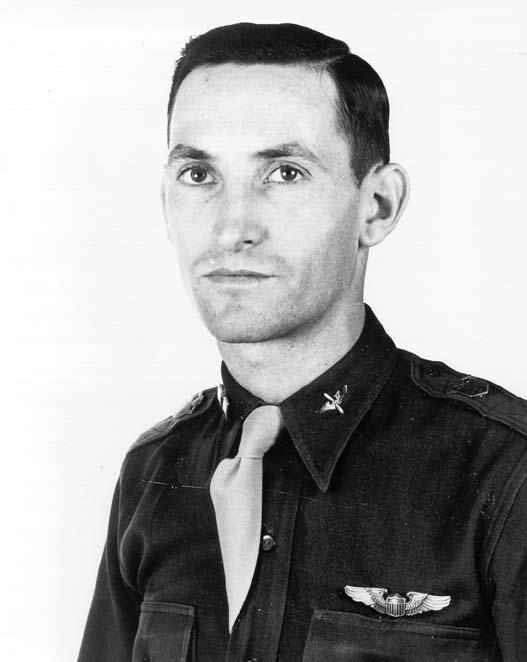
- Davis in 1945
- Born: December 1, 1920; Dublin, Texas, U.S.
- Died: February 10, 1952 (aged 31); Yalu River, North Korea
- Burial place: City of Lubbock Cemetery, Lubbock, Texas, U.S.
- Military career
- Allegiance: United States
- Branch: United States Army Air Forces; United States Air Force
- Service years: 1942–1952
- Rank: Lieutenant Colonel (posthumous)
- Nicknames: "Curly"; "One Burst Davis"
- Service number: O-671514 (USAAF); 13035A (USAF)
- Units: 312th Bombardment Group; 342nd Fighter Squadron; 71st Fighter-Interceptor Squadron
- Commands: 334th Fighter-Interceptor Squadron
- Conflicts: World War II; Pacific War; New Guinea campaign; Philippines campaign; Korean War; MiG Alley †
- Awards: Medal of Honor; Distinguished Service Cross; Silver Star (3); Distinguished Flying Cross (4); Purple Heart; Air Medal (10)

George Andrew Davis Jr. (December 1, 1920 – February 10, 1952) was a highly decorated fighter pilot and flying ace of the United States Army Air Forces in World War II, and later of the United States Air Force during the Korean War. He was killed in action during a combat mission in northwestern Korea, in an area nicknamed "MiG Alley". For his actions during the Korean War, Davis was posthumously awarded the Medal of Honor and promoted from major to lieutenant colonel.

Born in Dublin, Texas, Davis joined the United States Army Air Corps in early 1942. He was sent to the Pacific Theater after pilot training and flew in the New Guinea and Philippine campaigns, scoring seven victories over Japanese aircraft. He quickly gained a reputation as a skilled pilot and accurate gunner whose "daredevil" flying style contrasted with his reserved personality.

Davis did not see action in Korea until late 1951. Despite this, he achieved considerable success flying the F-86 Sabre fighter jet, quickly rising to become the war's ace of aces and downing fourteen North Korean, Chinese, and Soviet aircraft before his death in February 1952. During his final combat mission in northwestern Korea, Davis surprised and attacked twelve Chinese MiG-15 fighter jets, downing two of the MiG-15s before he was shot down and killed. Davis was the only flying ace of the United States to be killed in action in Korea. Controversies remain surrounding the circumstances of his death.

Davis is the fourth-highest US scoring ace of the Korean War, with a total of 14 victories added to the 7 he scored in World War II. He is one of seven US military pilots to become an ace in two wars, and one of 31 US pilots to be credited with more than 20 victories.

== Early life ==
Davis was born in Dublin, Texas, on December 1, 1920. He was the seventh of nine children born to George Davis Sr. and Pearl Love Davis. During his childhood, Davis also briefly lived in Maple, Texas. Davis attended Morton High School in Morton, Texas. Davis then attended Harding College in Searcy, Arkansas. After obtaining a degree, he returned to Texas. He took up farming for a time with his family before eventually deciding to join the military.

Friends and colleagues would later describe Davis as quiet, calm, and reserved as well as a natural leader. When flying, he would become "cool and calculating" in combat. He did not drink alcohol or smoke tobacco, unlike many other pilots, and he had a subdued personality despite his "daredevil" flying style.

Davis married Doris Lynn Forgason. They had children Mary Margaret Davis (born 1944) and George Davis III (born 1950). His wife was six months pregnant with their third child, Charles Lynn Davis, at the time of his death in 1952.

== Military career ==
=== World War II ===
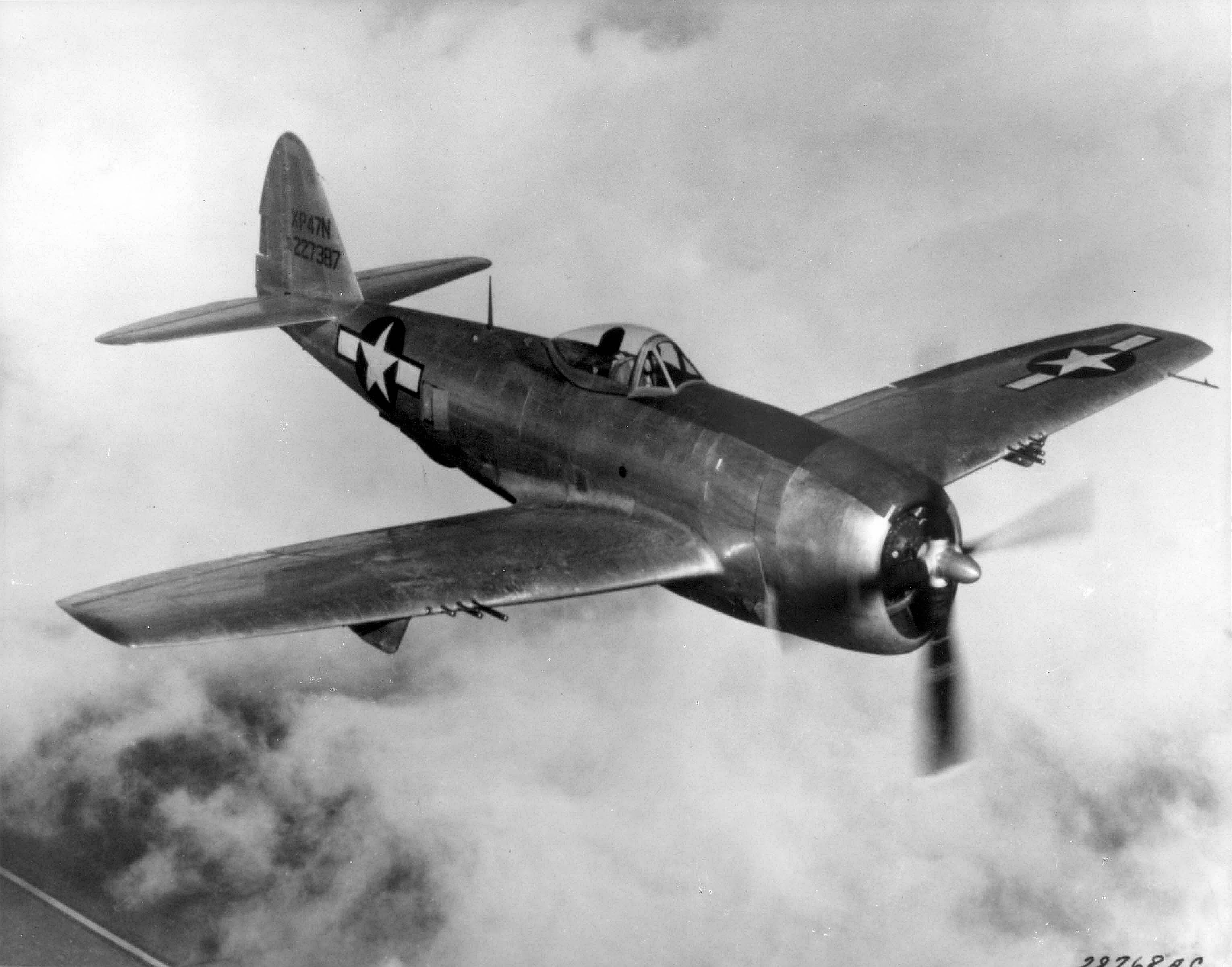
The P-47 Thunderbolt, the type of aircraft Davis flew during World War II

On March 21, 1942, Davis enlisted in the United States Army in Lubbock, Texas, just after the US entry into World War II. On June 3, he was appointed an aviation cadet in the Army Air Corps. He was moved to Kelly Field in San Antonio, Texas, for pre-flight training, which he completed in August. He was then moved to Jones Field in Bonham, Texas, for primary flight training. During this training, he got his first 60 hours of flight time aboard a Fairchild PT-19 trainer aircraft. Then he flew for another 74 hours during Basic Flight Training in Waco, Texas, and underwent a final stint of training aboard the T-6 Texan at Aloe Field in Victoria, Texas. On February 16, 1943, Davis completed his training, was commissioned as a second lieutenant in the US Army Reserve, and was immediately ordered into active duty with the Army Air Forces. By this time he had accrued 314 hours of flight time.

Davis's first assignment was to join the 312th Bombardment Group based at Bowman Field in Louisville, Kentucky, where he became qualified to fly the P-40 Warhawk fighter plane. He continued training there until August 1943, when the group was ordered to the Pacific Theater of Operations.

==== New Guinea ====
Davis was flown to Port Moresby, New Guinea, where he was quickly reassigned to the 342nd Fighter Squadron, 348th Fighter Group of the Fifth United States Air Force. The group flew the P-47 Thunderbolt fighter plane. By December, his unit moved to Finschhafen, where it was able to operate over the Solomon Sea against the air forces of the Empire of Japan, and he quickly earned the ironic nickname "Curly" because of his straight black hair. Davis was known among the pilots to be particularly confident. Davis served under the command of Colonel Neel E. Kearby, who himself would later receive the Medal of Honor. Many of the other pilots in the unit would quickly become aces as they participated in the conflict.

Davis's first combat experience came when his unit was sent on a patrol to Cape Gloucester on December 31, 1943, in support of the New Britain campaign as the Battle of Cape Gloucester began. However, the 15 aircraft were diverted to Arawe to the southwest to counterattack Japanese aircraft that were targeting Allied convoys during the Battle of Arawe. En route, they encountered 11 Japanese D3A Val and A6M Zero aircraft attacking an Allied convoy from 5,000 feet (1,500 m) to 10,000 feet (3,000 m). They immediately ambushed the Japanese planes. Davis quickly attacked a disorganized formation of the aircraft, downing a D3A Val as it completed a bombing run. By the end of the short battle, eight Japanese aircraft had been shot down and only one American plane had been damaged.

The next combat mission was on February 3, 1944. Sixteen P-47s were escorting a flight of B-24 Liberators on a bombing mission over Wewak. When they were 5 miles (8.0 km) west of the target area, they were ambushed by a flight of Nakajima Ki-43 Oscars and Kawasaki Ki-61 Tony aircraft at 17,000 feet (5,200 m). As the American aircraft rushed to the defense of the bombers, Davis managed to attack and shoot down a Ki-61 that had been attacking another P-47. In all, seven Japanese aircraft were destroyed in the attack. The next day, Davis was promoted to first lieutenant.

For the next several months, Davis's unit undertook patrol and escort missions in the Cape Gloucester area and around the islands of Saidor, Manus, and Momote. Through May, these actions were relatively uneventful, except for one fighter sweep mission from Wewak. From May to August, Davis flew 69 missions, including several dive-bombing attacks on Japanese positions on Hansa Bay. From September to November, Davis flew another 40 missions, including six patrols between Wakde Island and Hollandia. On November 14, Davis was promoted to the temporary rank of captain.

==== Philippines ====
Around December 1944, the unit began supporting missions in the Philippines and was moved to Tacloban Airport on Leyte Island. On December 10, after five uneventful weather-probing missions, Davis and the unit were assigned an escort mission. The aircraft were instructed to cover a flotilla of troop transports that were moving from Baybay to Oromoc Bay. En route, they were attacked by four Ki-61 Tony aircraft at 7,000 feet (2,100 m). After a series of quick maneuvers, Davis climbed to 15,000 feet (4,600 m) and took advantage of the sun's glare to ambush two aircraft below him. He pursued them as far as Cebu Island. He closed to within 75 yards (69 m) of the pair before destroying the first with his machine guns, and then the second near Negros Island as it attempted to dive for cover in a cloud.

... before (the Japanese aircraft) could make a pass at the bombers, I closed in on him from astern and fired at him from about 200 yards with no deflection. Some pieces flew off, and then he burst into flames and started down in a spin. My number three man saw this one crash. We then returned to the bombers and stayed with them until our fuel supply ran so low we were forced to leave them. I believe that up to the time we left the B-24s, no enemy fighters had gotten within firing range of them, although 10 to 15 aerial bombs had been dropped.

— Davis' after action report for the December 23 mission over Clark Field.

The unit undertook eight more patrol missions over Mindoro, covering Allied convoys.

On December 20, Davis was in one of twelve Thunderbolts patrolling Mindoro when eight A6M Zeroes were spotted attempting to ambush the flight from behind. Davis managed to rake the cockpit of one Zero and kill the pilot, earning him his fifth victory and the status of flying ace. Immediately after this, however, Davis's P-47 was struck by machine-gun fire from another aircraft, damaging the propeller and left wing components. On December 24, on a mission to escort several B-24s on a bombing mission of the Japanese-held Clark Field at Luzon, Davis shot down two more Zeroes that were part of a group of Japanese aircraft attempting to harass the bombers. Davis was awarded a Silver Star for this action.

Between the date of this action and February 19, 1945, Davis flew another 47 missions, most of them entailing the escorting of bombers or ships, and a few of them consisting of ground-attacks, but he saw little or no aerial combat during that time. On February 19, he was withdrawn from the front to begin certification on the P-51 Mustang, logging 45 hours of training time on the aircraft through the end of March. He returned to combat duty only briefly in April, flying in three combat missions as a copilot aboard a B-25 Mitchell bomber. On May 3, 1945, he was reassigned to Goodfellow Field at San Angelo, Texas, helping to train new pilots and serving as an operations officer for the base until the end of the war.

During his World War II service, Davis flew 266 missions, accruing a total of 705 combat hours and destroying seven Japanese aircraft. For these exploits, he was awarded the Silver Star, two Distinguished Flying Crosses and nine Air Medals. By the end of this war, Davis had over 2,200 hours of flight time.

==== Postwar ====
After the war's end, Davis served in several administrative positions in the United States. On August 10, 1945, he was assigned to the 556th Air Base Unit at Long Beach, California. On August 24, 1946, he was offered a commission as a first lieutenant in the active duty Army Air Corps, demoting him from his temporary rank but effectively allowing him to stay in the military despite the demobilization and downsizing of the US military. Several weeks later, on September 7, Davis was ordered to the 554th Air Base Unit in Memphis, Tennessee, where he served on one of the Army Air Corps aerobatic demonstration teams, the predecessors to the United States Air Force Thunderbirds.

Davis returned to front-line units on January 6, 1947, when he was moved to the 71st Fighter-Interceptor Squadron, 1st Fighter Group. He remained with this formation for most of the year. On September 18, 1947, the United States Air Force was created as a separate branch of the US Military. Davis was commissioned as a captain in the new branch. During his time with the 71st Squadron, Davis attended Air Tactical School and Tyndall Air Force Base. He was also a flight commander and air inspector while with the unit.

=== Korean War ===
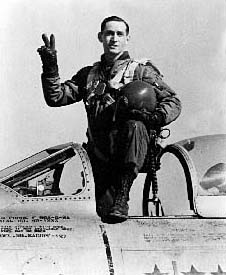
Davis in the cockpit of his F-86 Sabre jet in South Korea during his 1952 tour in the war

Upon the outbreak of the Korean War, Davis continued to serve in the 71st Squadron and did not see combat in the initial phase of the war. As it progressed, however, Davis began training on the F-86 Sabre (Sabrejet), the latest jet engine-powered fighter. On February 15, 1951, he was promoted to major and in October 1951 he was assigned to the headquarters of the 4th Fighter-Interceptor Wing, which was based in Japan and operating aircraft throughout Korea. Davis was thus sent to the conflict as a fighter pilot.

==== Command and success ====
During a patrol on November 4, 1951, Davis was credited with a "probable" victory over a Russian-made MiG-15 fighter jet of the Soviet Air Force or Chinese Air Force, giving him his first victory of the Korean War. On November 10, Davis was given command of the 334th Fighter-Interceptor Squadron, a unit of the 4th Wing. Davis and his squadron were relocated to Kimpo Airfield to allow them the best access to "MiG Alley" in North Korea, where much of the air-to-air combat took place. Of his leadership, subordinates often praised the quality of his training; Davis spent a great deal of time training new and younger pilots in tactics during his command. Commanders noted he often led by example, and Davis was known to be greatly respected, even among his rival ace pilots. He gained the nickname "One Burst Davis" for his extremely accurate shooting.

From November 1 to 26, he flew 17 missions in the Sinanju and Uiju areas, most resulting in no combat. On November 27, Davis was leading a formation of eight F-86s on a patrol near Sinanju, when they spotted and attacked six MiG-15s. He immediately downed one of the MiGs, striking its fuselage and forcing the pilot to bail out. He pursued a second MiG-15 to Koch'ong-ni and damaged it, forcing its pilot to bail out, as well. In all, four of the MiG-15s were destroyed by Davis's patrol.

A map of the area called "MiG Alley," where much of the air-to-air combat took place during the Korean War

For several more days, Davis led relatively quiet patrols, until November 30, Davis's 22nd combat mission in Korea. Around 16:00, Davis's flight of eight F-86s spotted a large group of nine Tupolev Tu-2 bombers from the Chinese 8th Bomber Division, escorted by 16 Lavochkin La-11 fighters from the Chinese 2nd Fighter Division near Sahol along the Yalu River. The force was en route to a bombing mission on Taehwado Island in the Pansong archipelago. Davis maneuvered the patrol into position for a firing pass on the bombers. He completed four attack runs on the formation, being continuously attacked by the La-11 fighters, which were unable to hit his aircraft. In spite of being separated from his wingmen, he managed to destroy two of the bombers and cause the crew of a third to bail out. By this time, another group of F-86s arrived to continue the fight, as Davis's aircraft were low on ammunition and fuel. As the flight attempted to withdraw, one of Davis's pilots, Raymond O. Barton, called for help. Davis flew to Barton's aid and found Barton's damaged aircraft under attack from 24 MiG-15s of the Chinese 3rd Fighter Division arriving as reinforcement. As two MiG-15s prepared a final attack on Barton, Davis swooped through their pass and scored direct hits on one, killing the Chinese flight leader who commanded the MiG pack. The second broke off its attack. Davis then escorted Barton's damaged aircraft back to base, landing with only 5 US gallons (19 L; 4.2 imp gal) of fuel left in his tanks. For the day's actions, Davis was awarded the Distinguished Service Cross. The Taehwado bombing mission forced the Chinese Air Force to end all bombing missions for the rest of the war, while the "hat trick"-plus-one of downing four Chinese aircraft in the fight resulted in raising Davis's confirmed victory count in Korea to six, making him the fifth jet ace of the war and the first man in the history of the US military to become an ace in two wars. At this point, Davis wrote to his family that he expected to be home by Christmas, but then the Air Force extended his tour of duty.

On December 5, Davis flew his next combat mission, his 23rd of the war. While on a search-and-destroy patrol over Rinko-do, Davis spotted two MiG-15s, shooting one down and forcing the other to withdraw. Ten minutes later, he spotted another MiG-15 preparing to attack near Haech'ang and destroyed it as well.

On December 13, another group of MiG-15s attacked Davis during a morning patrol near Yongwon. Davis destroyed one MiG, and as a second MiG attempted to target his wingman, Davis outmaneuvered it and shot it down. At the end of the patrol, Davis had amassed 10 victories, making him the first double ace of the war. During an afternoon patrol commanding twenty-two F-86's, Davis spotted fifty MiGs in the Sunchun, South Korea area heading further south towards the Taechon area. He surprised and destroyed one MiG, and then turned on another in an aggressive attack that forced the MiG pilot to bail out. After 30 combat missions in Korea, Davis had 12 victories.

After this successful series of patrols, Davis was ordered to conduct only one patrol a day to minimize the risk to him. The order had previously been sent on December 1, but Davis had apparently ignored it. Both the Air Force and Davis's family had growing concerns that Chinese and Soviet pilots would be gunning for Davis, given his success and fame. By this point, Davis had 12 victories, and the second-highest scoring aces each had six – Davis was averaging one victory for three missions.

In January, Davis wrote home, expressing frustration at the slow logistics of replacement aircraft parts, claiming this was slowing down missions. He also began to express contempt for the F-86, feeling at times it was being outperformed by the MiG and that "something will have to be done" to give the UN pilots more of an advantage in combat. He also said that he had begun to grow tired of the constant publicity about him. "They're trying to make a hero of me and I find it rather embarrassing", he wrote in a letter. At other times, Davis indicated he preferred to stay in combat.

In late January 1952, the Air Force told Davis it wanted to rotate him back to the United States. By this point, Davis held every record for a jet pilot, including most victories in all types of aircraft, most MiGs destroyed and most victories over propeller-driven aircraft. However, the Air Force determined it had no capable replacement who could command Davis's squadron, and other pilots indicated they wanted him to stay, considering him to be an able and effective leader.

== Death and controversy ==
On February 10, 1952, Davis flew his 59th and last combat mission of the war in an F-86E Sabre (tail number 51-2752); the circumstances of Davis's death and the identity of the person who killed him remain controversial. That day, he led a flight of four F-86s on a patrol near the Yalu River, near the Manchurian border. Davis's group was part of a larger UN force of 18 F-86s operating in the area. As Davis's patrol reached the border, one of his F-86 pilots reported he was out of oxygen, prompting Davis to order him to return to base with his wingman. As Davis continued patrolling with one wingman, Second Lieutenant William W. Littlefield, and cruising at an altitude of 38,000 feet (12,000 m), they spotted a flight of 12 MiG-15s of the Chinese 4th Fighter Division heading in the direction of a group of US F-84 Thunderjets conducting a low-level bombing mission on North Korean communication lines.

The MiGs were 8,000 feet (2,400 m) below Davis and Littlefield and had not noticed them. Without hesitating, Davis immediately flew behind the MiG-15 formation and attacked them from the rear. His surprise attack destroyed one of the MiG-15s, and he quickly turned to the next closest MiG and destroyed it before it could outmaneuver him. By this time, Davis and Littlefield had overtaken many of the MiGs, and some that were behind them began firing. Davis then moved to target a third MiG at the front of the formation, but as he was lining up his shot a MiG scored a direct hit on Davis's fuselage, causing his aircraft to spin out of control. Littlefield said later that he had spotted Davis's landing gear open, indicating hydraulic failure, and that he had attempted to defend Davis's aircraft as it lost altitude until Davis crashed and died. Littlefield reported that he had not seen Davis bail out of his aircraft. Davis was declared missing in action and presumed killed. Intense aerial searches of the area later revealed no evidence that Davis had survived the crash. Indeed, a week after the incident, the Chinese military searched the region and recovered Davis's body, which was found in the crashed aircraft. The Chinese never returned Davis's body to the United States.

In his four months in Korea, Davis had scored 14 confirmed victories, one probable victory and two aircraft damaged, bringing his career-total victory count to 21. By the end of the war, he was ranked fourth among pilots, surpassed by Joseph C. McConnell, James Jabara, and Manuel J. Fernandez, after his death. Immediately after receiving a report of Davis’ mission, his fellow ace Colonel Harrison Thyng, commander of the 4th Wing, recommended Davis for the Medal of Honor. On April 15, 1953, Davis was posthumously promoted to the rank of lieutenant colonel. Davis's cenotaph is located in the City of Lubbock Cemetery in Lubbock, Texas. Also buried at this cemetery is musician Buddy Holly and Medal of Honor recipient Herman C. Wallace. In April 1953, Davis's wife and family received his Medal of Honor from Air Force Chief of Staff, General Nathan F. Twining, at Reese Air Force Base in Lubbock.

=== Length of tour ===
If I could feel that he had lost his life for some good reason, I could feel better about it, but this is a war without a reason. The Air Force knew that he was more valuable here. Furthermore, Maj. Davis did not volunteer for Korean duty and did not ask to stay in Korea after he had shot down his fifth Red plane as the dispatches have read and as the public has been led to believe.

— Davis' wife, after his death.

After Davis's death, US Representative George H. Mahon (D-19) ordered an investigation into why Davis had remained in Korea after becoming a fighter ace. US military policy was to rotate pilots to stateside duty once they became aces, both so that they could train other pilots and so that they would not be killed in action. Mahon had been requesting that Davis be rotated back to the US up until a month before his death.

Davis's wife, Doris Davis, expressed anger toward the Air Force after his death, claiming that he had wanted to return to the United States after he became an ace, but had not been allowed to. She also claimed that he had been forced against his will into combat duty in Korea. Her complaints caused media attention to become focused on the Far East Air Force and its policies regarding the rotation of troops and pilots into and out of duty in Korea. Davis's wife had been a vocal opponent of the war since its beginning; she publicly denounced it after Davis's death, which widows of American soldiers rarely did during the war.

=== Necessity of action ===
Subsequent to Davis's death, some historians have questioned whether his actions had been necessary under the circumstances. Barrett Tillman (author, military aviation) contended that Davis's Medal of Honor had merely been a public-relations move by the US military to quell questions surrounding his death and to draw attention away from his wife's vocal opposition to the war. The Medal of Honor citation credited Davis with saving the F-84 formation, but the formation of F-86s that Davis was leading actually outnumbered the MiG-15s, so arguably Davis could easily have drawn them into the battle. Still, fellow pilots attested to Davis's bravery. Fellow ace William T. Whisner said, "George Davis was the best fighter pilot I ever knew. The only thing he didn't have was concern of his own life."

As the Korean War progressed, other pilots began to describe Davis as "more brazen, more aggressive, and more willing to take risks in Korea than he was during World War II." He became increasingly contemptuous of the Soviet and Chinese MiG pilots he faced as time went on, leading to other pilots thinking that he may have underestimated the skills of his opponents, and that this may have been a contributing factor in causing his death.

=== Identity of the shooter ===
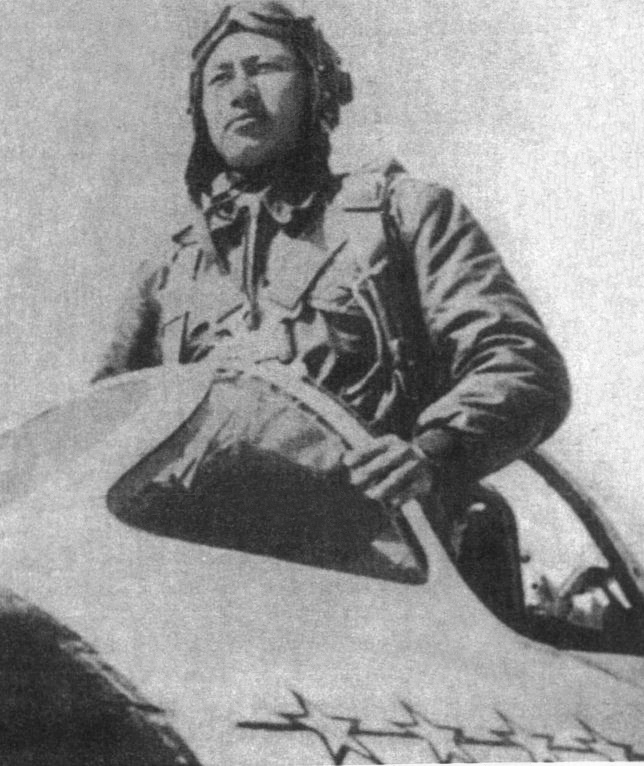
Zhang Jihui, the Chinese pilot who was one of two claiming to be responsible for Davis's death

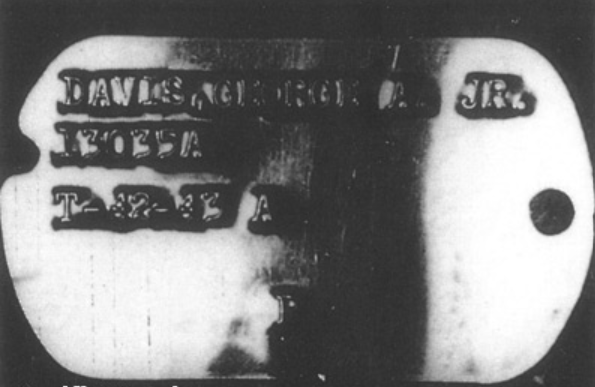
Davis's dog tag that was recovered from his body by the Chinese troops (1952)

Forty years after Davis's death, the identity of the person who shot Davis down, long assumed to be Chinese pilot Zhang Jihui, became a matter of dispute. Although Zhang had been credited by the Chinese with having shooting down Davis's F-86, after Russia declassified its involvement in the war Russian sources claimed that the pilot responsible had actually been Mikhail A. Averin (Михаил A. Аверин). Davis was the highest-ranking American Korean War ace at the time and the only American ace killed in action during the war. (Note: Though he was the only ace killed in action, Davis was not the only US ace to die during the war. Fellow ace Donald E. Adams was killed in a Detroit airshow crash in August 1952.) His death would have been a huge propaganda victory for the nation whose pilot was responsible for shooting him down. Davis's death at the hands of a Chinese pilot would also have been seen as avenging the losses inflicted by him over Taehwado Island on November 30, 1951. About 36 MiG-15s from the Chinese 4th Fighter Division were involved in the February 10 engagement in which Davis was killed, and Zhang was among the group. According to Zhang's own report after the battle, while the MiGs were en route to intercept Davis's group, he and his wingman became separated from the main element. As Zhang was trying to rejoin his formation, he spotted a group of eight F-86s in the area between Taechon and Chongye at 07:40. Zhang and his wingman then swung down onto the tails of two Sabres and opened fire. Zhang claimed that he had shot down both Sabres, but that reinforcements had soon thereafter destroyed his MiG and killed his wingman.

The publicity surrounding Davis's death soon caught Chinese attention. To determine whether Davis was killed by Zhang, given the absence of gun camera footage, the 4th Fighter Division sent out two search teams, on February 16 and 18. They recovered the wreckage of an F-86E, along with Davis' body and his belongings. His dog tag is currently on display at the Dandong Korean War Museum. (Note: Other objects from the wreck are on display at the Military Museum of the Chinese People's Revolution.) The search team also discovered that the crash site was within 550 yd (500 m) of where Zhang had ejected from his own aircraft, and that Zhang's 12th Regiment was the only unit that had operated near the area at the time. In light of these findings and the testimonies from ground troops that had witnessed the battle, Zhang was credited by the Chinese military with having shot down Davis's F-86.

However, according to the recollections of the pilots of the Soviet 64th Aviation Corps, both Zhang and his wingman were probably shot down by Davis, who was, in turn, surprised and shot down by Averin, who had been scrambling to save the Chinese MiGs. Lieutenant General Georgy Lobov (Г.А.Лобов), commander of the 64th Aviation Corps, also states in his memoirs that Davis was killed by a Soviet pilot.

Both China and Russia took credit for Davis's death, and there has been no conclusive evidence either way. Regardless of the uncertainty surrounding Davis's death, Zhang became a household name in China. The Chinese military later awarded Zhang the title of Combat Hero, 1st Class for this action.

== Aerial victories ==
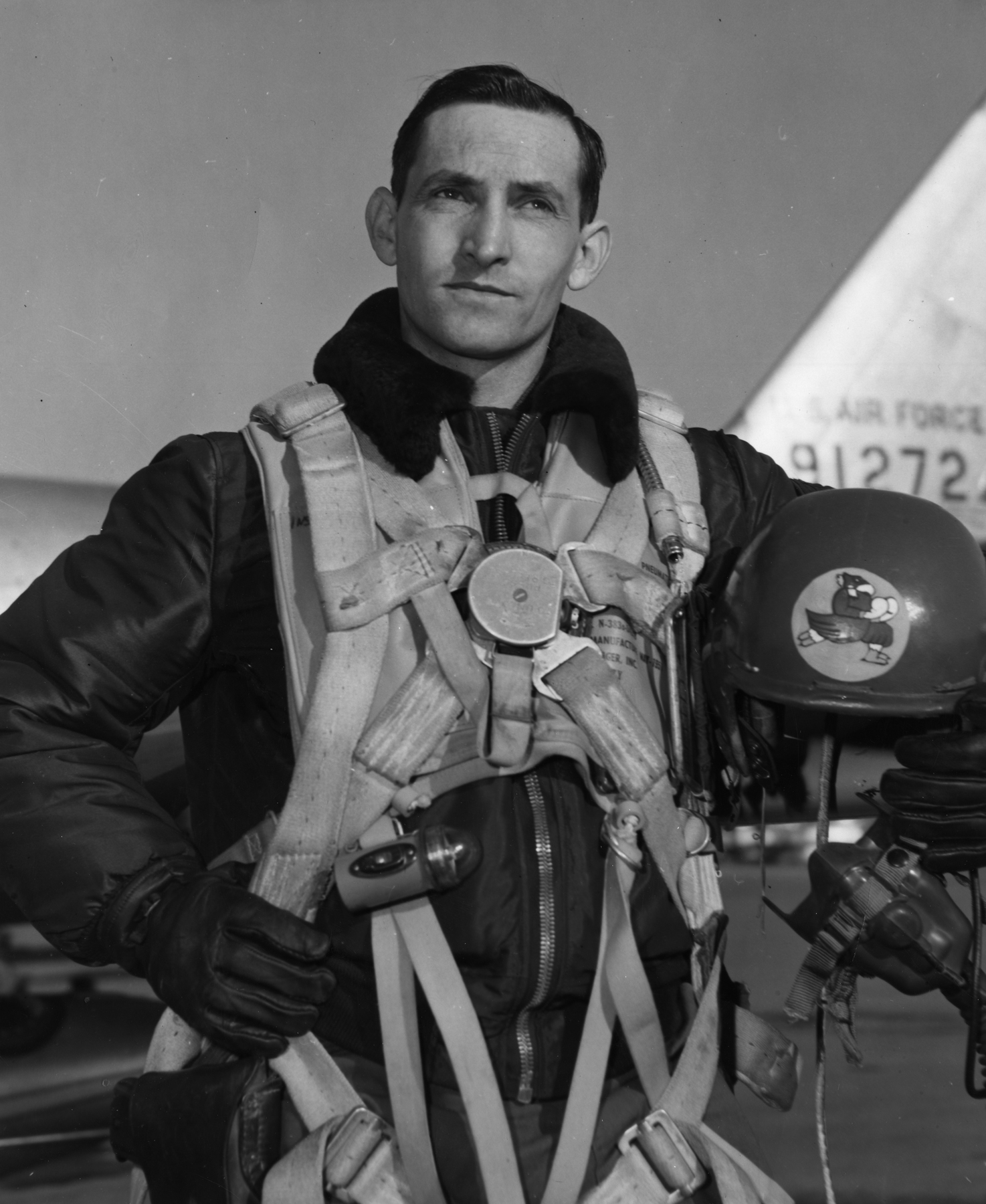
Davis c. early 1950s

Throughout his career, Davis was credited with 21 confirmed victories, one probable victory and two aircraft damaged. This made him one of only 30 US pilots to gain more than 20 confirmed victories over their careers. He had been known to be an extremely talented pilot and was especially accurate at deflection shooting, even from long distances against moving targets. Davis was one of 1,297 World War II aces from the United States, with seven confirmed kills during that war. He later became one of 41 Korean War aces from the United States, with 14 confirmed victories during that war. At the time of his death, he was the top-scoring ace from the US, making him the ace of aces. By the end of the war, he was the fourth-highest-scoring ace.

During the Korean War, Davis's accomplishments were particularly noteworthy. He was the only F-86 pilot to be awarded the Medal of Honor, and he was one of very few pilots who were able to score multiple kills on a single patrol. This was an extremely rare feat, which Davis accomplished on four occasions and which was rivaled only by fellow ace James Jabara who also scored a notable number of double victories. In shooting down four Chinese aircraft on November 30, 1951, Davis scored the most kills in a single day of any pilot in the war. Davis also took the shortest time to become a double ace; just 17 days in Korea. The next best pilot achieved the feat in 51 days.

Davis is one of six US Air Force pilots and seven US pilots overall who achieved ace status as both a piston-engined pilot in World War II and as a jet pilot in a later conflict. The others are Francis S. Gabreski, James P. Hagerstrom, William T. Whisner, Vermont Garrison and Harrison Thyng, as well as John F. Bolt of the US Marine Corps.

Date	#	Type	Location	Aircraft flown	Unit
December 31, 1943	1	Aichi D3A	Arawe, New Guinea	P-47 Thunderbolt	342 FS, 348 FG
February 3, 1944	1	Ki-61 Hien	Wewak, New Guinea	P-47 Thunderbolt	342 FS, 348 FG
December 10, 1944	2	Ki-61 Hien	Cebu and Negros Islands, Philippines	P-47 Thunderbolt	342 FS, 348 FG
December 20, 1944	1	A6M Zero	Mindoro, The Philippines	P-47 Thunderbolt	342 FS, 348 FG
December 24, 1944	2	A6M Zero	Clark Field, Luzon, Philippines	P-47 Thunderbolt	342 FS, 348 FG
November 27, 1951	2	MiG-15	Sinanju, North Korea	F-86 Sabre	334 FIS, 8 FIG
November 30, 1951	3	Tupolev Tu-2	Sahol, North Korea	F-86 Sabre	334 FIS, 8 FIG
November 30, 1951	1	MiG-15	Sahol, North Korea	F-86 Sabre	334 FIS, 8 FIG
December 5, 1951	1	MiG-15	Rinko-do, North Korea	F-86 Sabre	334 FIS, 8 FIG
December 5, 1951	1	MiG-15	Haechang, North Korea	F-86 Sabre	334 FIS, 8 FIG
December 13, 1951	2	MiG-15	Yongwon, North Korea	F-86 Sabre	334 FIS, 8 FIG
December 13, 1951	2	MiG-15	Sunchon, South Korea	F-86 Sabre	334 FIS, 8 FIG
February 12, 1952 (Note: US Air Force did not publicly acknowledge Davis' death until two days later.)	2	MiG-15	Sinuiju, North Korea	F-86 Sabre	334 FIS, 8 FIG

== Citations ==
Davis was the third of four members of the US Air Force to be awarded the Medal of Honor in the Korean War, after Louis J. Sebille, John S. Walmsley Jr. and before Charles J. Loring Jr. All four Air Force recipients of the MOH were pilots who were killed in action and the only USAF members to be awarded the Army version of the medal.

=== Medal of Honor Citation ===
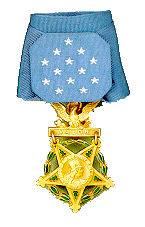

Maj. Davis distinguished himself by conspicuous gallantry and intrepidity at the risk of his life above and beyond the call of duty. While leading a flight of four F-86 Saberjets on a combat aerial patrol mission near the Manchurian border, Maj. Davis' element leader ran out of oxygen and was forced to retire from the flight with his wingman accompanying him. Maj. Davis and the remaining F-86's continued the mission and sighted a formation of approximately 12 enemy MIG-15 aircraft speeding southward toward an area where friendly fighter-bombers were conducting low level operations against the Communist lines of communications. With selfless disregard for the numerical superiority of the enemy, Maj. Davis positioned his two aircraft, then dove at the MIG formation. While speeding through the formation from the rear he singled out a MIG-15 and destroyed it with a concentrated burst of fire. Although he was now under continuous fire from the enemy fighters to his rear, Maj. Davis sustained his attack. He fired at another MIG-15 which, bursting into smoke and flames, went into a vertical dive. Rather than maintain his superior speed and evade the enemy fire being concentrated on him, he elected to reduce his speed and sought out still a third MIG-15. During this latest attack his aircraft sustained a direct hit, went out of control, then crashed into a mountain 30 miles south of the Yalu River. Maj. Davis' bold attack completely disrupted the enemy formation, permitting the friendly fighter-bombers to successfully complete their interdiction mission. Maj. Davis, by his indomitable fighting spirit, heroic aggressiveness, and superb courage in engaging the enemy against formidable odds exemplified valor at its highest.

=== Distinguished Service Cross citation ===

The President of the United States of America, under the provisions of the Act of Congress approved July 9, 1918, takes pride in presenting the Distinguished Service Cross (Posthumously) to Major George Andrew Davis, Jr. (AFSN: 0-671514/13035A), United States Air Force, for extraordinary heroism in connection with military operations against an armed enemy of the United Nations while serving as Squadron Commander, 334th Fighter-Interceptor Squadron, 4th Fighter-Interceptor Wing, FIFTH Air Force, on 27 November 1951, during an engagement with enemy aircraft near Sinanju, Korea. While leading a group formation of thirty-two F-86 aircraft on a counter air mission, Major Davis observed six MIG-15 aircraft headed southward above the group. With exemplary leadership and superior airmanship, he maneuvered his forces into position for attack. Leading with great tactical skill and courage, Major Davis closed to 800 feet on a MIG-15 over Namsi. He fired on the enemy aircraft, which immediately began burning. A few seconds later, the enemy pilot bailed out of his aircraft. Continuing the attack on the enemy forces, Major Davis fired on the wingman of the enemy flight, which resulted in numerous strikes on the wing roots and the fuselage. As Major Davis broke off his relentless attack on this MIG-15, another MIG-15 came down on him. He immediately brought his aircraft into firing position upon the enemy and after a sustained barrage of fire, the enemy pilot bailed out. Although low on fuel, he rejoined his group and reorganized his forces to engage the approximate 80 enemy aircraft making the attack. Against overwhelming odds, Major Davis' group destroyed two other MIG-15 aircraft, probably destroyed one and damaged one other. Major Davis' aggressive leadership, his flying skill and devotion to duty contributed invaluable to the United Nations' cause and reflect great credit on himself, the Far East Air forces and the United States Air Force.

== Awards and Decorations ==
Davis's military decorations and awards include:

Badge	Senior Pilot Badge		
1st row	Medal of Honor		
2nd row	Distinguished Service Cross	Silver Star with 2 Oak leaf clusters	Distinguished Flying Cross with 3 Oak leaf clusters
3rd row	Purple Heart	Air Medal with 8 Oak leaf clusters	Air Medal additional ribbon required per regulation
4th row	Presidential Unit Citation with 2 Oak leaf clusters	American Campaign Medal	Asiatic-Pacific Campaign Medal with 8 Campaign stars
5th row	World War II Victory Medal	National Defense Service Medal	Korean Service Medal with 2 Campaign stars
6th row	Air Force Longevity Service Ribbon with 1 Oak leaf cluster	Philippine Liberation Medal with 2 Campaign stars	Philippine Presidential Unit Citation
7th row	Korean Presidential Unit Citation	United Nations Service Medal Korea	Korean War Service Medal Retroactively Awarded, 2003

== See also ==
- List of Korean War air aces
- List of Korean War Medal of Honor recipients
- List of solved missing person cases: 1950–1999
- List of World War II aces from the United States

== Sources ==
- Ecker, Richard E. (2004), Battles of the Korean War: A Chronology, with Unit-by-Unit United States Casualty Figures & Medal of Honor Citations, Jefferson, North Carolina: McFarland & Company, ISBN 978-0786419807
- Harvey, Bill (2003), Texas Cemeteries: The Resting Places of Famous, Infamous, and Just Plain Interesting Texans, Austin: University of Texas Press, ISBN 978-0292734661
- King, O. H. P. (February 12, 1952), "Air Force Probe Is Ordered After Major Davis Shot Down In Korea", Lubbock Avalanche-Journal, 30 (90), Lubbock, Texas, ISSN 1394-2131
- Lorenz, William E.; Oliver, Dwight L. (1999), The Inner Seven: The History of Seven Unique American Combat 'Aces' of World War II and Korea, Nashville, Tennessee: Turner Publishing Company, ISBN 978-1563115042
- Stanaway, John (1999), Mustang and Thunderbolt Aces of the Pacific and CBI, Oxford: Osprey Publishing, ISBN 978-1855327801
- Tillman, Barrett (2002), Above and Beyond: The Aviation Medals of Honor, Washington, D.C.: Smithsonian Institution, ISBN 978-1588340566
- Werrell, Kenneth P. (2005), Sabres Over MiG Alley: The F-86 and the Battle for Air Superiority in Korea, Annapolis, Maryland: Naval Institute Press, ISBN 978-1591149330
- Wei, C. X. George; Liu, Xiaoyuan (2001), Chinese Nationalism in Perspective: Historical and Recent Cases, Westport, Connecticut: Greenwood Publishing Group, ISBN 978-0313315114
- Zhang, Xiao Ming (2004), Red Wings Over the Yalu: China, the Soviet Union, and the Air War in Korea, College Station: Texas A&M University Press, ISBN 978-1585442010
