= 450th Expeditionary Flying Training Squadron =

450th Expeditionary Flying Training Squadron

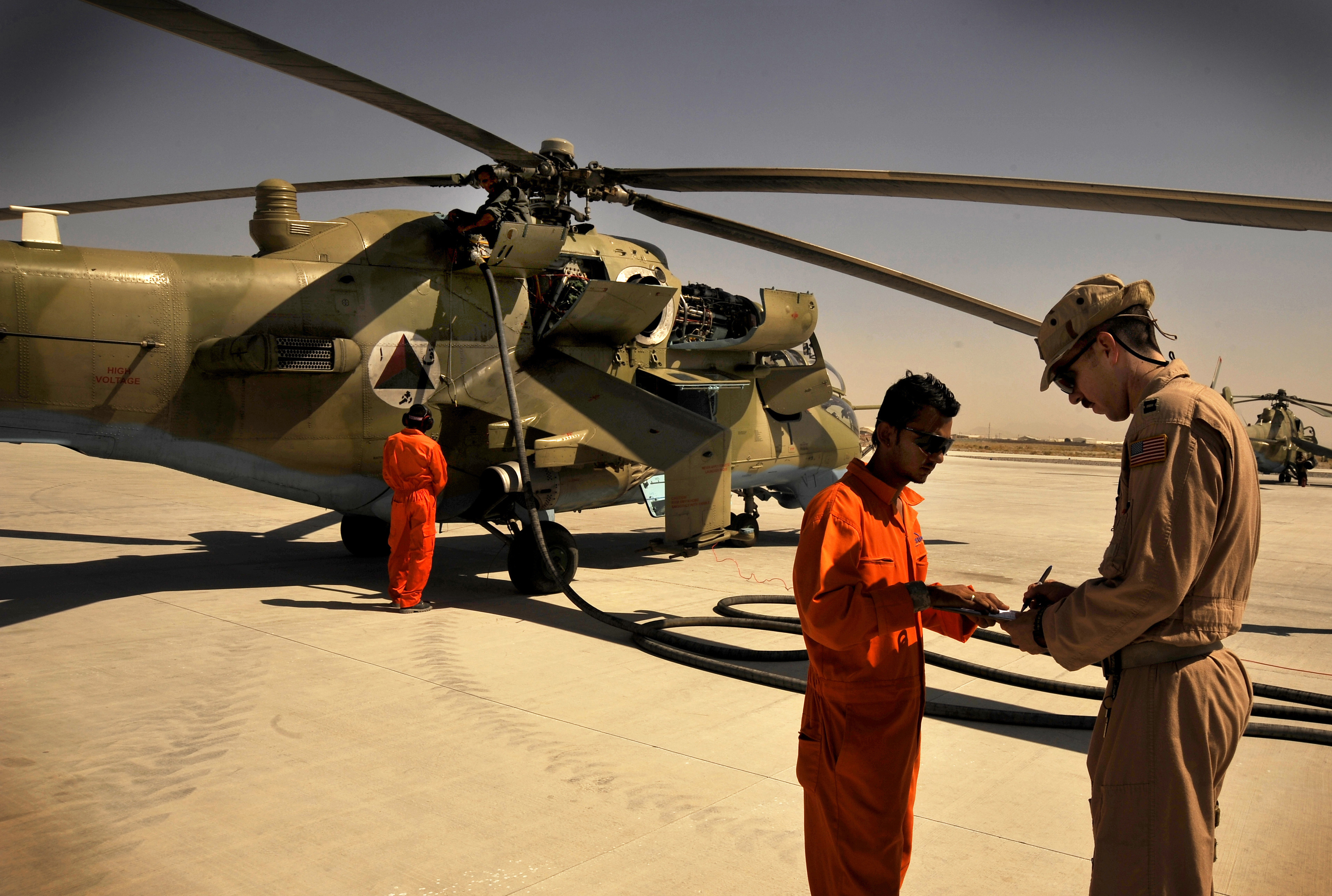
- Afghan Mil Mi-35 Hind with 450th Expeditionary Flying Training Squadron member
- Active: 1942-1945; 1947-1949; 1954-1957; 1973-1992; c. 2009
- Country: United States
- Branch: United States Air Force
- Role: Flying training
- Part of: Air Combat Command
- Engagements: European Theater of Operations; War in Afghanistan (2001–2021)
- Decorations: Distinguished Unit Citation; Air Force Outstanding Unit Award

Insignia
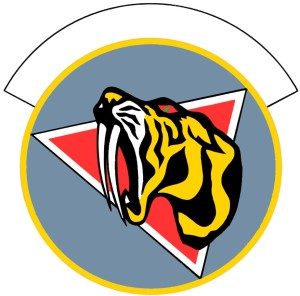
- 450th Expeditionary Flying Training Squadron emblem (Note: Approved 30 May 1973.)

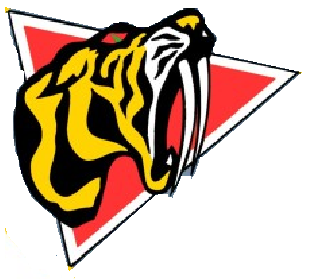
- 450th Fighter-Day Squadron emblem (Note: Approved 13 June 1955. Description: Over a red triangle with wide white border, outlined black, a stylized sabre-toothed tiger's head in his proper colors, yellow black, and white, his eyeball red, pupil green.)

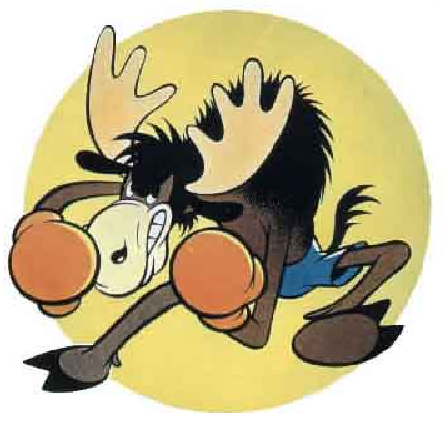
- 450th Bombardment Squadron emblem
- World War II fuselage Code: ER

The 450th Expeditionary Flying Training Squadron is a provisional United States Air Force unit. The squadron was first activated as the 450th Bombardment Squadron in July 1942. After training in the United States, it deployed to the European Theater of Operations (ETO) in December 1942. It engaged in combat operations from 1943 to 1945, earning a Distinguished Unit Citation for demonstrating the effectiveness of medium bombers in the ETO. Following V-E Day, it participated in the disarmament of the Luftwaffe until September 1945, when it returned to the United States for inactivation.

The squadron served in the reserves from October 1947 to June 1949, when it was inactivated as the military budget was reduced, although it does not appear to have been fully manned or equipped with operational aircraft at this time.

The squadron was activated in July 1954 as the 450th Fighter-Day Squadron and equipped with North American F-86 Sabre fighters. Although it upgraded to the North American F-100 Super Sabre it was inactivated in November 1957, when Tactical Air Command reduced the number of fighter groups at Foster Air Force Base from two to one.

In 1973, Air Training Command was converting its flying training units from MAJCON status. As part of this reorganization, the squadron was redesignated the 450th Flying Training Squadron and replaced the 3537th Electronic Warfare Training Squadron at Mather Air Force Base, California. It conducted flight training for members of the United States military and foreign allies until inactivating in May 1993 as Mather prepared for closure.

On 28 October 2008, it was converted to provisional status as the 450th Expeditionary Flying Training Squadron and assigned to Air Combat Command to activate or inactivate as needed. In 2009, it was active at Kandahar Air Base, training Afghan Army Air Corps personnel on Soviet-built helicopters.

== History ==
=== World War II ===
==== Initial organization and training ====
The squadron was first activated at MacDill Field, Florida on 17 July 1942 as the 450th Bombardment Squadron, one of the four original squadrons of the 322nd Bombardment Group. However, it did not receive its initial cadre until 7 August. It was equipped with Martin B-26 Marauders and trained with them at MacDill and at Drane Field, Florida. The ground echelon of the squadron departed for the Port of Embarkation in November and sailed for the United Kingdom aboard the RMS Queen Elizabeth on 24 November, arriving in the United Kingdom six days later. The air echelon continued training in Florida until it began to ferry its Marauders from Morrison Field to Europe via the South Atlantic ferry route as new aircraft became available. The 450th was the first squadron of the group to leave the United States, departing on 6 February 1943, with its last B-26 arriving on 9 March 1943.

==== Combat in the European Theater ====
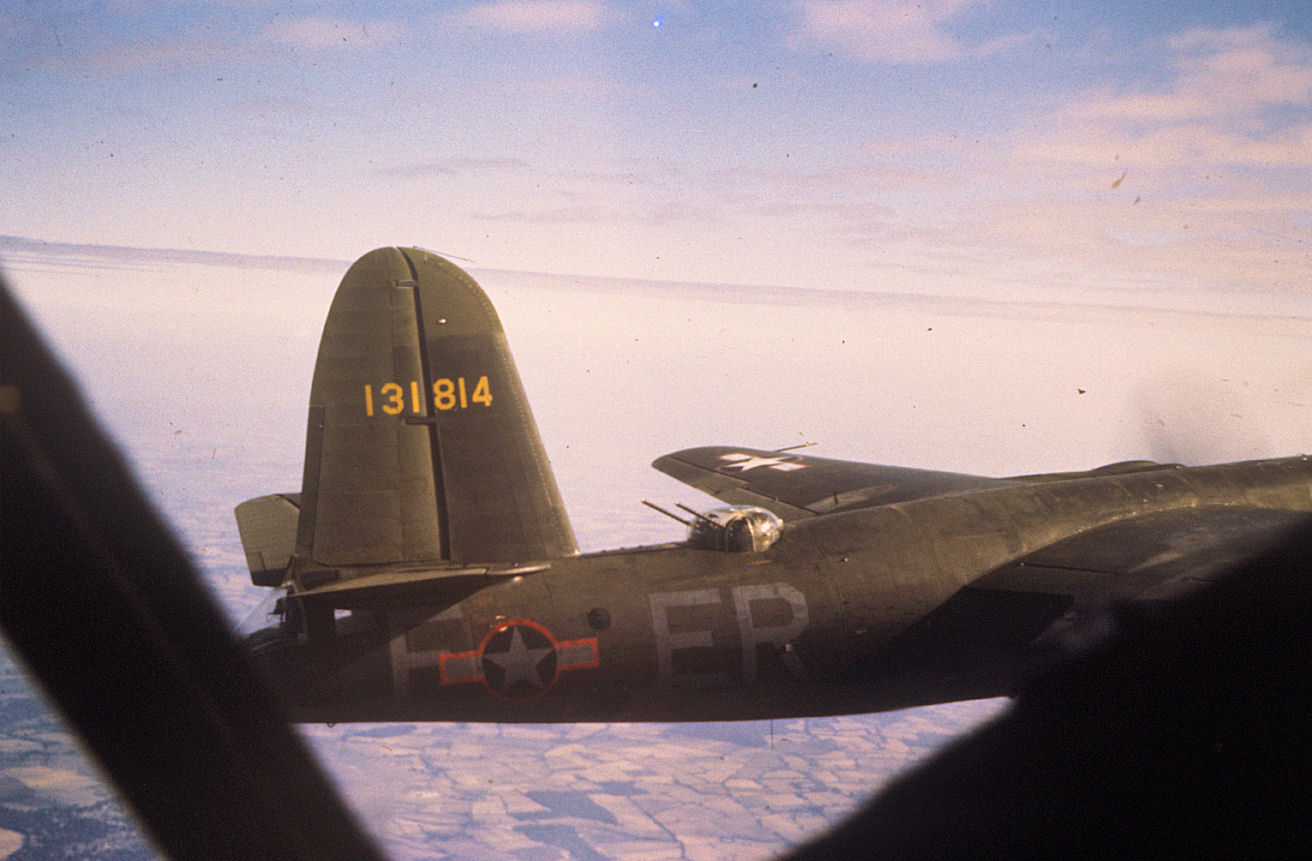
Squadron B-26 Marauder (Note: Airplane is Martin B-26B-25-MA Marauder, serial 41-31814, ER-F Bag of Bolts in flight over England. This plane was transferred to the 452d Bombardment Squadron and was shot down on 8 July 1944 by a Messerschmitt Bf 110G-4 flown by Maj Wolfgang Himming of Stab/Nachtjagdgeschwader 4 (Headquarters, Night Fighter Wing 4). One crewmember killed. Five bailed out, with three becoming prisoners of war and the other two evading capture. Missing Aircrew Report 6626.)

The ground echelon was established at RAF Bury St Edmunds, its first combat station, on 1 December 1942. The 322nd Group flew its first mission, and the first B-26 Marauder mission in the European Theater of Operations, on 14 May against an electrical power plant near IJmuiden in the Netherlands using low level attack tactics. The attack was led by Maj Othel Turner, the squadron's commander and one of seven men wounded during the mission. Three days later, the group dispatched eleven planes for a repeat low level attack on the IJmuiden power plant and another at Haarlem in the Netherlands. One plane returned early due to a mechanical malfunction. The remaining ten aircraft and their crews were lost to enemy action. For these actions and for demonstrating the effectiveness of medium bombers, the 322nd Group, including the squadron, was awarded the Distinguished Unit Citation. (Note: Following the raids, the 322nd was withdrawn from combat for training ln medium altitude bombing and equipping its planes for that tactic, returning to combat on 17 July.)

In June 1943, the squadron, along with all other B-26 units in England, moved to Essex, an area where it was planned to build up a tactical air force for the forthcoming invasion of Europe, with the 450th arriving at RAF Great Saling on 12 June. Once the squadron reentered combat, enemy airfields were its principal targets through February 1944, but it also attacked power stations, shipyards, construction works, marshalling yards and other targets. In March 1944, its emphasis shifted to railway and highway bridges, and oil storage facilities in preparation for Operation Overlord, the invasion of Normandy. It also participated in Operation Crossbow, the attacks on V-1 flying bomb and V-2 rocket launch sites.

On D-Day, the squadron attacked coastal defenses and artillery batteries. It supported the Allies in the Battle for Caen and in Operation Cobra, the breakout at Saint Lo in July. Through August and September, it provided air support for the drive of United States Third Army across Northern France.

In late September, the squadron moved from England to Beauvais/Tille Airfield, France. It bombed bridges, road junctions, defended villages, and ordnance depots in the assault on the Siegfried Line from October through December of 1944. During the Battle of the Bulge, it flew attacks on railroad bridges to cut German lines of communications. From then until it flew its last mission on 24 April 1945, it concentrated on communications, bridges, marshalling yards and fuel dumps.

Following V-E Day, the 450th transferred its aircraft and flying personnel to other units. The remainder of the squadron personnel then moved to Frankenberg, Germany, and later to Arolsen as part of the military occupation force. It engaged in inventorying and disassembling Luftwaffe equipment until September 1945. In December it returned to the United States and was inactivated at the Port of Embarkation on 11 December 1945.

=== Air Force reserve ===
The squadron was reactivated in the reserves on 10 August 1947 at Phillips Field, Maryland, on the Aberdeen Proving Ground reservation. It does not appear to have been fully manned and was equipped only with trainer aircraft. In July 1948 Continental Air Command (ConAC) assumed responsibility for managing reserve and Air National Guard units from ADC. President Truman’s reduced 1949 defense budget required reductions in the number of units in the Air Force, and the 450th was inactivated and not replaced as responsibility for military flying activity at the field was transferred to the Army.

=== Fighter operations ===
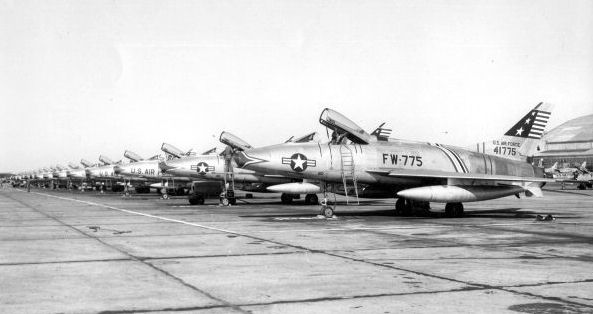
F-100s at Foster AFB in 1956 (Note: Aircraft in foreground is North American F-100C-5-NA Super Sabre, serial 54-1775. This plane was shot down in Southeast Asia on 2 August 1968. Baugher, Joe (24 July 2023). "1954 USAF Serial Numbers". Joe Baugher.)

The squadron was redesignated the 450th Fighter-Day Squadron and activated at Foster Air Force Base, Texas as Tactical Air Command took over Foster from Air Training Command (ATC). It was initially equipped with North American F-86 Sabre fighters, but by 1955 was replacing them with supersonic North American F-100 Super Sabres. However, the Air Force decided to close Foster. In November 1957, the 450th Fighter-Day Wing reduced to a single group and the squadron was inactivated along with other elements of the 322nd Fighter-Day Group.

=== Navigator training ===
==== Background ====
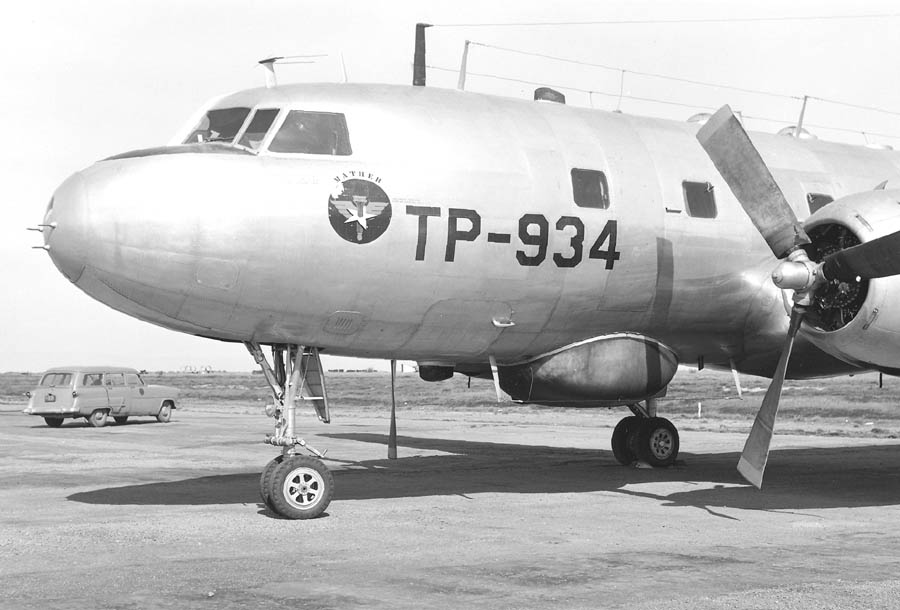
Convair T-29C from Mather AFB

The 3537th Training Squadron was established at Mather Air Force Base on 12 December 1949. With mission changes, it was redesignated the 3537th Support Squadron, 3537th Aircraft Observer Training Squadron and 3537th Navigator Training Squadron. Throughout, it was part of the 3535th Wing, which in its final incarnation was the 3535th Navigator Training Wing. In 1963, Air Training Command (ATC) transferred its electronic warfare officer training to Mather from Keesler Air Force Base, Mississippi since Keesler's runways could not be extended to accommodate high performance aircraft. The squadron became the 3437th Electronic Warfare Training Squadron. Training was initially conducted with Douglas TC-54 aircraft, but later with Convair T-29 Flying Classrooms equipped with special electronics.

However, the 3537th was a Major Command controlled (MAJCON) unit, created by ATC. MAJCON units could not carry a permanent history or lineage. ATC received authority from Headquarters USAF to discontinue its MAJCON flying training wings and to activate Air Force controlled (AFCON) units, most of which were inactive at the time, which could carry a lineage and history.

==== Training operations ====
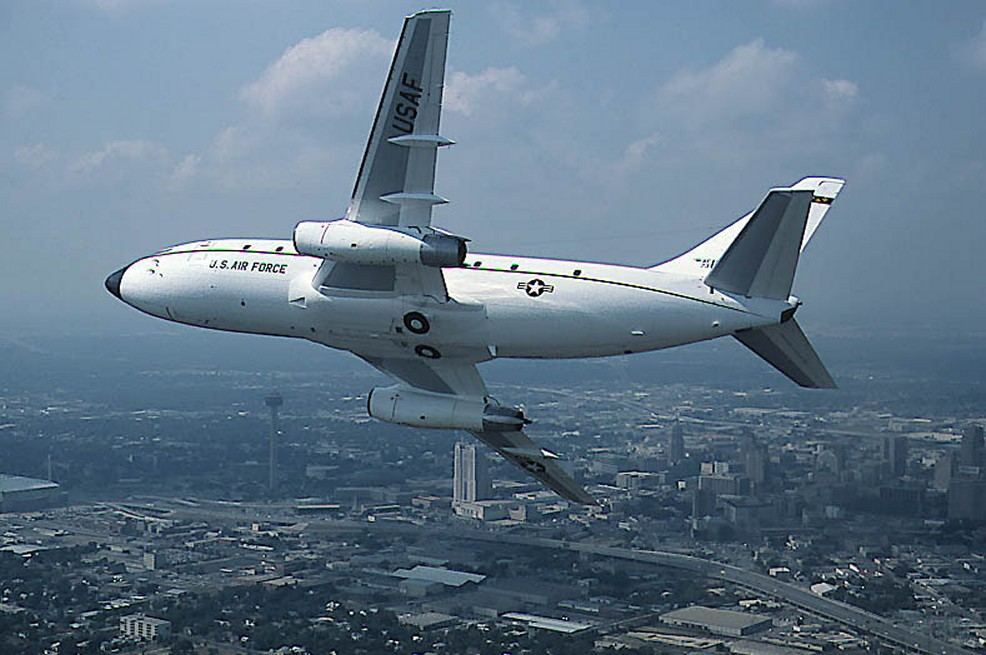
T-43 Bobcat as flown by the squadron

On 1 April 1973, the squadron was activated as the 450th Flying Training Squadron. It absorbed the personnel, mission and resources of the 3537th Electronic Warfare Training Squadron which was simultaneously inactivated. The squadron was initially responsible for training electronic warfare officers. In 1978, the first females began navigator training. By 1987, the 450th Squadron had become responsible for training officers on the fighter, attack and reconnaissance track of specialized undergraduate navigator training (SUNT). In 1988, this responsibility changed to training new officers on the initial 'core" training given to all enrolled in SUNT. This change in mission made the 450th the largest flying training squadron in ATC. It continued to conduct undergraduate navigator training for USAF, United States Navy, United States Marine Corps, and United States allies until 1992. In 1989, the base closure commission recommended that Mather be closed. The Air Force moved its navigator training to Randolph Air Force Base, Texas and the squadron was inactivated on 10 November 1992 as Mather drew down in preparing for closing on 1 October 1993.

=== Expeditionary operations ===
On 28 October 2008, the squadron was converted to provisional status as the 450th Expeditionary Flying Training Squadron and assigned to Air Combat Command to activate or inactivate as needed. By October 2009, the squadron was activated at Kandahar Air Base, Afghanistan, where it was involved in training airmen of the Afghan National Army Air Corps with Soviet-built helicopters, supplemented with members of the Czech Air Force. In October 2009, the squadron added three Mil Mi-35 Hind helicopters to the Mil Mi-17 Hips it was already using.

== Lineage ==
- Constituted as the 450th Bombardment Squadron (Medium) on 19 June 1942

Activated on 17 July 1942
Redesignated 450th Bombardment Squadron, Medium on 20 August 1943
Inactivated on 17 December 1945

- Redesignated 450th Bombardment Squadron, Light on 3 July 1947

Activated in the reserve on 10 August 1947
Inactivated on 27 June 1949

- Redesignated 450th Fighter-Day Squadron on 24 March 1954

Activated on 1 July 1954
Inactivated on 18 November 1957

- Redesignated 450th Flying Training Squadron on 28 July 1972

Activated on 1 April 1973
Inactivated on 10 November 1992

- Redesignated 450th Expeditionary Flying Training Squadron and converted to provisional status on 28 Oct 2008
- Activated by 3 October 2009
- Inactivated unknown

=== Assignments ===
- 322d Bombardment Group, 17 July 1942 - 17 December 1945
- 322d Bombardment Group, 10 August 1947 - 27 June 1949
- 322d Fighter-Day Group, 1 July 1954 - 18 November 1957
- 323d Flying Training Wing, 1 April 1973
- 323d Operations Group, 15 December 1991 - 10 November 1992
- Air Combat Command, to activate or inactivate at any time after 28 Oct 2008

Unknown October 2009

=== Stations ===
- MacDill Field, Florida, 17 July 1942
- Drane Field, Florida, 22 September-15 November 1942
- Camp Kilmer, New Jersey, 15–23 November 1942
- RAF Bury St Edmunds (Rougham) (AAF-468), England, 1 December 1942
- RAF Great Saling (later Andrews Field) (AAF-485), England, 12 June 1943
- Beauvais/Tille Airfield (A-61) (also B-42), France, c. 21 September 1944
- Le Culot Airfield (A-89) (also B-68), Belgium, 5 April 1945
- Frankenberg, Germany, 6 July 1945
- Arolsen, Germany, 10 September 1945
- Clastres Airfield, France, c. 1 October-29 November 1945
- Camp Kilmer, New Jersey, 16–17 December 1945
- Phillips Field, Maryland, 10 August 1947 - 27 June 1949
- Foster Air Force Base, Texas, 1 July 1954 - 18 November 1957 (deployed to Wendover Air Force Base, Utah, 3 January – 4 February 1957)
- Mather Air Force Base, California, 1 April 1973 - 10 November 1992
- Kandahar Air Base c. 3 October 2009

=== Aircraft ===
- Martin B-26 Marauder (1942–1945)
- North American AT-6 Texan (1947–1949)
- Beechcraft AT-11 Kansan (1947–1949)
- North American F-86 Sabre (1954–1955)
- North American F-100 Super Sabre (1955–1957)
- Convair T-29 Flying Classroom (1973–1974)
- Cessna T-37 Tweet (1974–1992)
- Boeing T-43 Bobcat (1973–1992)
- Mil Mi-17 Hip (2009)
- Mil Mi-35 Hind (2009)

=== Awards and campaigns ===
Award streamer	Award	Dates	Notes
	Distinguished Unit Citation	14 May 1943 – 24 July 1944	European Theater of Operations, 450th Bombardment Squadron
	Air Force Outstanding Unit Award	1 April – 31 December 1973	450th Flying Training Squadron
	Air Force Outstanding Unit Award	1 January 1976 – 28 February 1977	450th Flying Training Squadron
	Air Force Outstanding Unit Award	1 January 1978 – 30 April 1979	450th Flying Training Squadron
	Air Force Outstanding Unit Award	1 January 1980 – 30 April 1981	450th Flying Training Squadron
	Air Force Outstanding Unit Award	1 April 1990 – 31 March 1992	450th Flying Training Squadron

Campaign Streamer	Campaign	Dates	Notes
	Air Offensive, Europe	14 May 1943–5 June 1944	450th Bombardment Squadron
	Air Combat, EAME Theater	14 May 1943–11 May 1945	450th Bombardment Squadron
	Normandy	6 June 1944–24 July 1944	450th Bombardment Squadron
	Northern France	25 July 1944–14 September 1944	450th Bombardment Squadron
	Rhineland	15 September 1944–21 March 1945	450th Bombardment Squadron
	Ardennes-Alsace	16 December 1944–25 January 1945	450th Bombardment Squadron
	Central Europe	22 March 1944–21 May 1945	450th Bombardment Squadron
	Consolidation III	unknown	450th Expeditionary Flying Training Squadron

== See also ==
- List of Martin B-26 Marauder operators
- List of F-86 Sabre units
- List of F-100 units of the United States Air Force
