= Changguan, Shandong =

Changguan 长官镇
- Town
- Location in Shandong Changguan (China)
- Coordinates: 37°48′00″N 116°55′49″E
- Country: People's Republic of China
- Province: Shandong
- Prefecture-level city: Dezhou
- County: Ningjin
- Elevation: 17 m (56 ft)
- Time zone: UTC+8 (China Standard)
- Area code: 0534

Changguan (simplified Chinese: 长官; traditional Chinese: 長官; pinyin: Chángguān) is a town in Ningjin County in northwestern Shandong province, China, located about 5 kilometres (3.1 mi) south of the border with Hebei and 20 km (12 mi) north-northeast of the county seat. As of 2011, it has 50 villages under its administration.
