= Ningjin County, Shandong =

Ningjin County 宁津县
- County
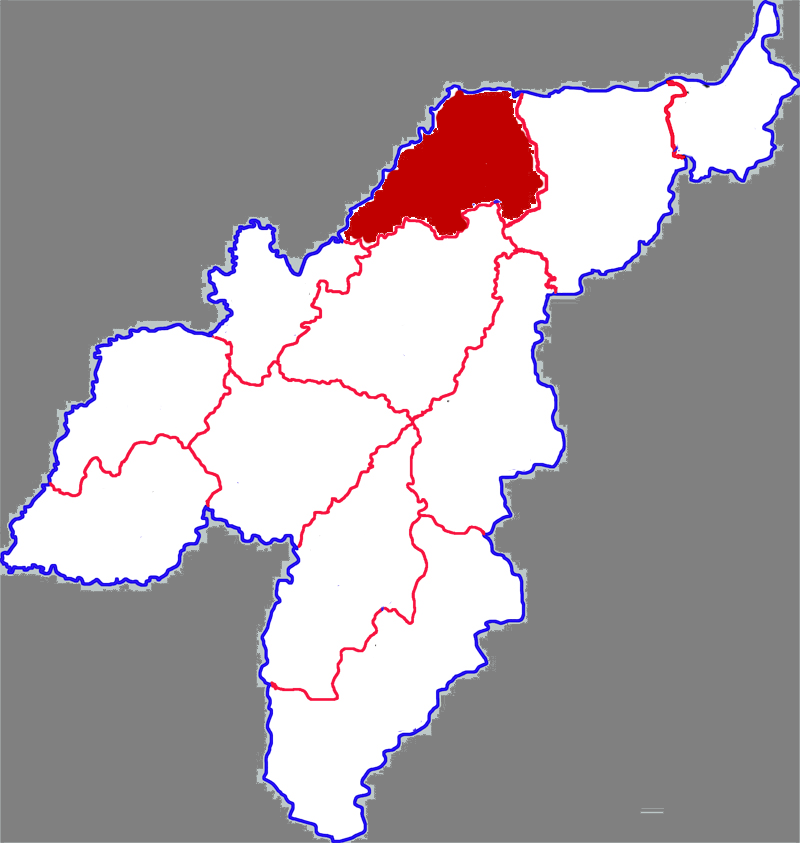
- Ningjin in Dezhou

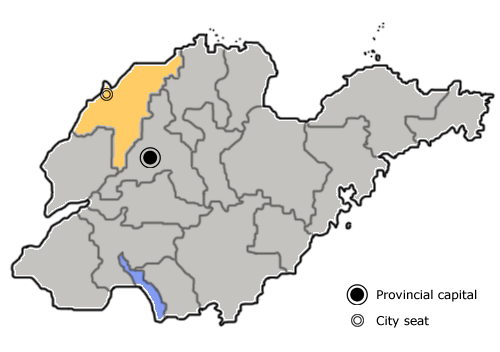
- Dezhou in Shandong
- Coordinates: 37°39′07″N 116°48′00″E
- Country: People's Republic of China
- Province: Shandong
- Prefecture-level city: Dezhou

Area
  - Total: 833 km^{2} (322 sq mi)

Population (2019)
  - Total: 463,300
  - Density: 556/km^{2} (1,440/sq mi)
- Time zone: UTC+8 (China Standard)
- Postal code: 253400

Ningjin County (simplified Chinese: 宁津县; traditional Chinese: 寧津縣; pinyin: Níngjīn Xiàn) is a county in the northwest of Shandong province, People's Republic of China, bordering Hebei province to the north. It is administered by the prefecture-level city of Dezhou.

The population was 444,038 in 1999.

Ningjin has been famous for its acrobatics from as early as during the Han dynasty. In 1995 the Ministry of Culture designated Ningjin as the hometown of Chinese acrobatics.

== Administrative divisions ==
As of 2012, this county is divided to 9 towns and 2 townships.

Towns

- Ningjin (宁津镇)
- Chaihudian (柴胡店镇)
- Changguan (长官镇)
- Duji (杜集镇)
- Baodian (保店镇)
- Daliu (大柳镇)
- Dacao (大曹镇)
- Xiangya (相衙镇)
- Shiji (时集镇)

Townships

- Zhangdazhuang Township (张大庄乡)
- Liuyingwu Township (刘营伍乡)

== Climate ==
Climate data for Ningjin, elevation 17 m (56 ft), (1991–2020 normals, extremes 1981–2010)
Month	Jan	Feb	Mar	Apr	May	Jun	Jul	Aug	Sep	Oct	Nov	Dec	Year
Record high °C (°F)	17.1 (62.8)	22.3 (72.1)	29.5 (85.1)	31.3 (88.3)	38.1 (100.6)	41.3 (106.3)	40.2 (104.4)	35.5 (95.9)	35.0 (95.0)	31.4 (88.5)	25.3 (77.5)	17.4 (63.3)	41.3 (106.3)
Mean daily maximum °C (°F)	3.2 (37.8)	7.2 (45.0)	13.9 (57.0)	20.7 (69.3)	26.5 (79.7)	31.5 (88.7)	31.9 (89.4)	30.2 (86.4)	26.9 (80.4)	20.7 (69.3)	11.8 (53.2)	4.7 (40.5)	19.1 (66.4)
Daily mean °C (°F)	−2.7 (27.1)	0.9 (33.6)	7.6 (45.7)	14.4 (57.9)	20.4 (68.7)	25.4 (77.7)	27.1 (80.8)	25.4 (77.7)	20.7 (69.3)	14.2 (57.6)	5.9 (42.6)	−0.8 (30.6)	13.2 (55.8)
Mean daily minimum °C (°F)	−7.4 (18.7)	−4.0 (24.8)	2.0 (35.6)	8.6 (47.5)	14.4 (57.9)	19.7 (67.5)	22.7 (72.9)	21.3 (70.3)	15.6 (60.1)	8.9 (48.0)	1.2 (34.2)	−5.2 (22.6)	8.2 (46.7)
Record low °C (°F)	−19.2 (−2.6)	−16.8 (1.8)	−9.6 (14.7)	−4.0 (24.8)	2.5 (36.5)	7.6 (45.7)	14.9 (58.8)	11.7 (53.1)	4.1 (39.4)	−4.2 (24.4)	−14.0 (6.8)	−21.0 (−5.8)	−21.0 (−5.8)
Average precipitation mm (inches)	2.4 (0.09)	7.7 (0.30)	7.4 (0.29)	23.1 (0.91)	41.4 (1.63)	75.1 (2.96)	161.5 (6.36)	141.8 (5.58)	37.0 (1.46)	34.1 (1.34)	15.7 (0.62)	3.0 (0.12)	550.2 (21.66)
Average precipitation days (≥ 0.1 mm)	1.5	2.5	2.3	5.0	6.0	8.2	10.8	9.5	5.7	4.8	3.7	1.9	61.9
Average snowy days	2.4	2.6	1.0	0.2	0	0	0	0	0	0	1.0	1.8	9
Average relative humidity (%)	60	56	52	56	60	61	76	82	74	67	66	63	64
Mean monthly sunshine hours	171.5	175.2	221.8	239.9	265.6	237.9	200.7	202.3	210.7	203.8	169.5	164.0	2,462.9
Percentage possible sunshine	56	57	60	60	60	54	45	49	57	59	56	55	56
Source: China Meteorological Administration

== Transportation ==
- G1818 Binzhou–Dezhou Expressway

== Industry and Economy ==
Ningjin County is the largest production base for gym and fitness equipment in China, forming a sports industry cluster together with its surrounding counties and cities.
