= Operation Strangle (Korean War) =

U.N. air-based military attack during the Korean War

Operation Strangle was a sustained interdiction attack on North Korea's supplies and communications by the United Nations forces during the Korean War. Beginning in August 1951, the campaign's 87,552 interdiction sorties were credited with destroying 276 locomotives, 3,820 railroad cars, 19,000 rail cuts, and 34,211 other vehicles. The North Koreans countered the campaign by moving anti-aircraft (AA) guns and crews towards the front line and placing them in higher concentrations around important targets, causing heavy casualties in the UN forces. Despite high losses, Operation Strangle destroyed 900 AA gun positions and damaged 443.

By December 1951, North Korea was able to repair rail cuts in less than six hours, bridges in two to four days, and other bomb damages fairly quickly. By May 1952, it was apparent that their supply efforts had increased support to their front-line troops despite the air attacks. By June, half of the North's anti-aircraft guns—132 cannons and 708 automatic weapons—were posted along North Korea's railroads.

Chinese forces made advances towards the goal of an armistice agreement. The USAF created an "air pressure strategy" to put political pressure on the North Korean politicians, and the U.S. Air Force (USAF) continued an aerial bombing campaign throughout the negotiations, until July 27, 1953 when armistice negotiations came to a halt over prisoners of war (POWs).

The new strategy used air power as a form of direct political pressure. Colonel Richard Randolph and Ben Mayo oversaw planning for the air pressure strategy by selecting proper targets for air operations. The two kept in mind the scarce targets in North Korea and suggested attacking the least maneuverable target. On June 26, 1952, the Far East Air Force (FEAF) Target Committee proposed that their combat operations policy should be rewritten sufficiently to follow the Fifth Air Force and FEAF Bomber Command (BOMBCOM) to maintain "air pressure" through destructive operations. Once General Otto P. Weyland, commanding general of the FEAF, approved the changes on June 29, 1952, the new military plan painted North Korean towns and villages as major targets to be destroyed by the bombers. FEAF's Fifth Air Force eventually selected seventy-eight villages as targets for the B-26 light bombers.

The North Koreans had large numbers of radar-directed anti-aircraft guns, 88 mm and 85 mm (including long-range 120s or 155s). They also had a large quantity of smaller guns, including 37 mm, 20 mm cannons and 12.7mm heavy machine guns. Additionally, they also had radar-directed searchlights, which could hold line-of-sight of the night-flying U.N. planes. The U.N. used electronic jamming against the communist radar on the radar-directed A.A. guns, but most U.N. planes were lost to the smaller guns.

Operation Strangle led the U.N. forces to hit a range of weapons, including AA guns and strategic positions.
