= Grigory Pulov =

Soviet air force officer

- Григорий Иванович Пулов
- Born: 18 January [O.S. 5 January] 1918; Podolets, Vladimir Governorate, RSFSR
- Died: 26 December 2005 (aged 88); Moscow, Russian Federation
- Military career
- Allegiance: Soviet Union
- Branch: Soviet Air Force
- Service years: 1942—1975
- Rank: General-major of Aviation
- Conflicts: Korean War
- Awards: Hero of the Soviet Union

Grigory Ivanovich Pulov (Russian: Григорий Иванович Пулов; 18 January [O.S. 5 January] 1918 — 26 December 2005) was a Soviet air force officer in command of the 17th Fighter Aviation Regiment during the Korean War. Credited with an estimated eight to ten aerial victories over Korea, (Note: It is very difficult to verify Korean War pilot shootdowns for a variety of reasons. Nevertheless, in recent years as more information from loss reports from both sides has become available, aviation historians have noticed high rates of overclaiming were prevalent on both sides of the conflict, casting doubt on the ace status claims of many pilots. For more information, read about overestimation of aerial victories in the Korean War) he was awarded the title Hero of the Soviet Union on 22 April 1952 for his achievements during the war.

== Early life ==
Pulov was born on 18 January [O.S. 5 January] 1918 to a Russian family in Podolets village Vladimir Governorate, RSFSR. After graduating from his tenth grade of school in 1934 in Yuryev-Polsky he initially worked as a primary school teacher, and eventually went on the graduate from the Vladimir Pedagogical College as well as the local aeroclub in 1937. He then briefly worked as a geography teacher, although he soon became a flight instructor at the Kostroma aeroclub in 1939, having graduated from the Kherson School of Pilot-Instructors in December 1938.

== World War II ==
Although he initially remained as a flight instructor at the Kostroma aeroclub after the German invasion of the Soviet Union, Pulov eventually transferred to military duty in March 1942 and briefly attended training in a reserve aviation regiment before being deployed to the frontlines of the war in August as a pilot in the 959th Fighter Aviation Regiment. There, he piloted the Hawker Hurricane and Yak-7 fighters, protecting sites of military importance such as railway junctions as well as escorting cargo aircraft to the frontlines. Despite having started off as a pilot, he quickly rose up in his unit, gaining a promotion to the position of squadron commander in April 1943. On 28 June 1944 he gained his first aerial victory when he shot down an He 111 during a night battle west of Smolensk. Having made 54 sorties in the war, in March 1945 he relinquished command of his squadron to attend the Air Force Academy in Monino, which he graduated from in 1949.

== Korean War ==
After graduating from the Air Force Academy he was initially appointed deputy commander of the 523rd Fighter Aviation Regiment, which was originally based in Yaroslavl but relocated to the Russian Far East in 1950 and subsequently to China several months later. Although he entered combat in the Korean War in March 1951, he was soon given command of the 17th Fighter Aviation Regiment to replace Ivan Parshikov in April. Pulov immediately began putting the pilots under his command through flying drills and simulated dogfights to increase their combat readiness, since the regiment's first sorties that took place before he was given command of the unit were considered disappointing by air force leadership. The regiment's performance improved, and Pulov frequently participated in the sorties with his unit. Eventually on 25 August he claimed his first aerial victory in the war, hitting a Gloster Meteor from No. 77 Squadron of the RAAF. Although he admitted he did not see the aircraft crash, he did say he saw smoke and flames emitting from the plane, and assumed it crashed shortly thereafter. During the same dogfight, Nikolai Sutyagin also claimed a victory over a Gloster Meteor. Meanwhile, Australian sources indicate that two Gloster Meteors from the No. 77 Squadron were lost due to a collision while attempting to land at their base in Kimpo; it has been suggested by aviation historian Igor Seidov that those two aircraft ended up in the collision due to the damage inflicted by Pulov and Sutyagin during the aerial battle.

On 31 August he went on to claim his second aerial victory. That day, he participated in a major sortie under the command of General Georgy Lobov. During the encounter with American aircraft, four Soviet aviators (Lobov, Pulov, Ponomaryov, and Bozhko) each claimed a solo shootdown of an American F-80, for a total of four F-80s. However, American sources indicate the loss of just one F-80 and F-84. Most likely, the F-80 that was shot down by either Pulov or one of the other three Soviet pilots was F-80 No. 49-859, piloted by Jake Henderson, who became a POW.

On 1 September Pulov decided to take command of squadron No.2 so that he could head strike groups. The next day, the weather was good enough to fly in combat, and the regiment made three sorties that day. The second sortie started off after a group of six B-29 bombers and their accompanying fighter escort were detected to be 20 km South of Junsen at around 10:00 AM, resulting in squadrons No.2 and 3 of the 17th Fighter Regiment being scrambled to confront them. During that sortie, Pulov noticed a group of eight F-86 very close ahead of him on his left while flying near Ansu. At an altitude of 11000 meters, Pulov decided to make an attack, and ordered Captain Shcherbakov to cover him as he zeroed in on one of the F-86. Having become aware of the MiGs presence, the F-86s began to drop their external fuel tanks and turn to the right to dodge the attack, but left one F-86 lagging behind, which Pulov went for, opening fire on it from 400 meters away. Senior lieutenant Gostyukhin confirmed witnessing the shootdown, and the shootdown was confirmed by camera footage. Two other pilots in the squadron also claimed shootdowns; Morozov’s shootdown claim was supported by film evidence, but Kordanov’s claim was not documented on film. However, American loss reports do not indicate any F-86 shot down on that occasion. Later on 11 September Pulov claimed another shootdown of an F-86, but because it was neither captured on film nor verified by authorities on the ground it was omitted from his tally. The aerial battles that month proved to be particularly intense; on several occasions Pulov’s MiG was damaged in battle, having engaged in dogfights against numerically superior forces on more than one occasion.

The aerial battles in October resulted in similar difficulties: on 2 October, flight commander Morozov was shot down while flying as Pulov’s wingman. Although Pulov claimed to have shot down an F-80 or F-84 in that battle, it was not included in his tally because there was no verification of the shootdown from ground authorities, although American records do indicate the loss of a RF-80A 45-8472 by Bruce Sweney that day. Earlier that day, Pulov's aircraft had been hit by enemy fire. Eventually on 5 October, Pulov was reprimanded by his superiors for his compilation of reports describing the regiments aerial battles. However, that day, Pulov claimed a F-86 shootdown, which, despite being witnessed by captain Blagov and being supported by confirmation from authorities on the ground about aircraft being downed, was not included in his official tally. Nevertheless, the next day Pulov got an aerial victory added to his tally, which made him considered an ace: that day, at roughly 8:30 AM, he led a group of 22 MiGs in an engagement to confront a group of attack aircraft that were protected by fighter escort. During the battle, he claimed one F-86 shootdown, while Mishakin and Komarov claimed a shared victory of another one. However, two MiGs in his sustained damage, although both pilots were able to make safe landings at their designated airfield. Meanwhile, the aircraft that Pulov hit and claimed as an aerial victory was most likely F-86A 49-1178, which, although damaged in the battle, was not destroyed.

In addition to leading confrontations against groups of fighter aircraft in dogfights, Pulov participated in joint raids involving other regiments that went after American B-29 bombers. On October 22, the start of what became known as the "dark week" among American B-29 crews flying in MiG alley, 20 MiG-15 from Pulov's 17th Fighter Aviation Regiment joined forces with an additional 20 fighters from the 523rd Regiment under the command of Grigory Okhay and 14 fighters from the 18th Guards Regiment under the command of Alexander Smorchkov. However, Pulov and Okhay's regiments ended up engaging with groups of F-80 and F-84 attack aircraft while Smorchkov's unit went out to meet the bombers. As result, Pulov decided to pursue a group of 16 F-84 attack aircraft; although they managed to break up the formation, Pulov ended up having to turn away from the engagement when his wingman (Viktor Blagov) suffered a fogged up cockpit, leaving captain Stepan Artemchenko in charge of the attack on the F-84s. Things then got worse for the MiG pilots when a group of F-86s swooped in to provide cover for the F-84s, leaving the pilots of the 17th Regiment outnumbered in addition to being spread thin, with many pilots separated from their wingmen. Eventually, Alexander Shirokov, who lost sight of his wingman, teamed up with Pulov; as the two flew near the Yalu River, they were attacked by two F-86s, leaving 12 holes in Pulov's plane and inflicting 16 to Shirokov's plane as well as injuring him. Nevertheless, both managed to land their badly damaged aircraft at the airfield, where they underwent repairs and were eventually returned to service. Although they did not suffer any losses, the sortie was considered unsuccessful by division command, which laid fault on Artemchenko and Pulov for failing to maintain leadership of the unit during the mission. Later that week he was also subject to criticism in reports from division command for maintaining poor unit organization during subsequent aerial battles. Subsequently on 26 October, Pulov claimed the shootdown of an F-80, but with losses mounting, eventually at the end of the month it was decided to send Pulov to sanatorium starting on 1 November for a brief vacation to recover from the physical and mental stress of flight.

After returning from vacation on 17 November he returned to leading his regiment into battle, and in December he was promoted to the rank of lieutenant colonel. Eventually on 6 January he claimed an aerial victory over an F-86, but so did eight other pilots in the 64th Fighter Aviation Corps that day; however, the American side documented the loss of only one F-86 that day. That morning, a group of enemy fighters and ground attack aircraft were detected heading for the Ansu area, and so the 303rd Fighter Aviation Division was tasked with confronting them. Tasked with covering nearby units and repelling the raid, Pulov led his regiment in the sortie; while over the Taysen area, Sutyagin noticed a flight of F-86s heading for Pulov's tail, forcing Pulov to make evasive maneuvers, breaking up the group of F-86 and allowing him to zero in on one on his left. After flying in downward spirals, he eventually managed to open fire on the F-86 from 700 meters away. Due to the American side recording the loss of only one F-86 but three F-84s and an F-80 that day, it is possible that he mistook one of those aircraft for an F-86.

On 3 February at slightly past 1:00 PM he claimed his last aerial victory when he led a sortie of 14 MiGs, and ended up confronting 24 F-86s. It is possible that the aircraft he hit was F-86A 49-1223 piloted by Charles Ray Spath, who bailed out of his plane and became a prisoner of war.

In total Pulov flew 115 sorties and engaged in 60 aerial battles during the war, being personally credited with eight shootdowns. His regiment ended up not only suffering the fewest losses in the division as well as claiming the most (108) aerial victories. Eventually he was awarded the title Hero of the Soviet Union on 22 April 1952 for his feats in the Korean War.

== Later life ==
After returning from his deployment in Korea, he was initially stationed in the Russian Far East, and remained in command of the 17th Fighter Aviation Regiment until October 1953. He then transferred to being an adjunct in the Department of Fighter Aviation and Air Defense Tactics at the Air Force Academy in Monino, where he remained until 1954. From then to 1960 he served as a senior flight inspector in the Combat Training Directorate of Fighter Aviation and Air Defense Forces. He then became the deputy commander of the 24th Fighter Aviation Division, and was promoted to commanding officer of the division in 1963. In 1968 he moved on to command the 15th Air Defense Corps, and in December 1970 he became the deputy commander of the Baku Air Defense District. After retiring from the military in December 1974 he worked at the Mikoyan Design Bureau as a designer and engineer before retiring altogether in 1988. He died in Moscow on 26 December 2005 and was buried in the Troyekurovskoye Cemetery.

== Awards ==
- Hero of the Soviet Union (22 April 1952)
- Order of Lenin (22 April 1945)
- Three Order of the Red Banner (10 October 1951, 14 August 1957, and 22 February 1968)
- Two Order of the Patriotic War 1st class (31 July 1944 and 11 March 1985)
- Order of the Red Star (14 May 1956)
- Medal "For Battle Merit" (30 December 1956)
- Medal of Sino-Soviet Friendship (China)

== Aerial victories ==
Aircraft flown	Date	Enemy aircraft	Notes
Yak-7	28 June 1944	He 111	Shot down west of Smolensk.
MiG-15	25 August 1951	Gloster Meteor	Possibly Gloster Meteor Mk.8 A77-354, although Australian sources attribute the loss to a midair collision
MiG-15	31 August 1951	F-80	Possibly F-80 49-859
MiG-15	2 September 1951	F-86	Possibly F-86A 49-1258 piloted by Lawrence Layton.
MiG-15	27 September 1951	F-84	Status unclear
MiG-15	2 October 1951	RF-80	Presumably RF-80A 45-8472 piloted by Bruce Sweney who was declared MIA. Not included in his official tally.
MiG-15	5 October 1951	F-86	Identity unclear; witnessed by captain Blagov and remains of F-86 found by ground authorities. Not included in his official tally.
MiG-15	6 October 1951	F-86	F-86A 49-1178 damaged but not downed.
MiG-15	26 October 1951	F-80	Identity unclear. Three USAF F-80 reported shot down that day.
MiG-15	6 January 1952	F-86	Status unclear
MiG-15	3 February 1952	F-86	Possibly F-86A 49-1223 piloted by Captain Charles Ray Spath, who became a POW.
