= List of Korean War flying aces =

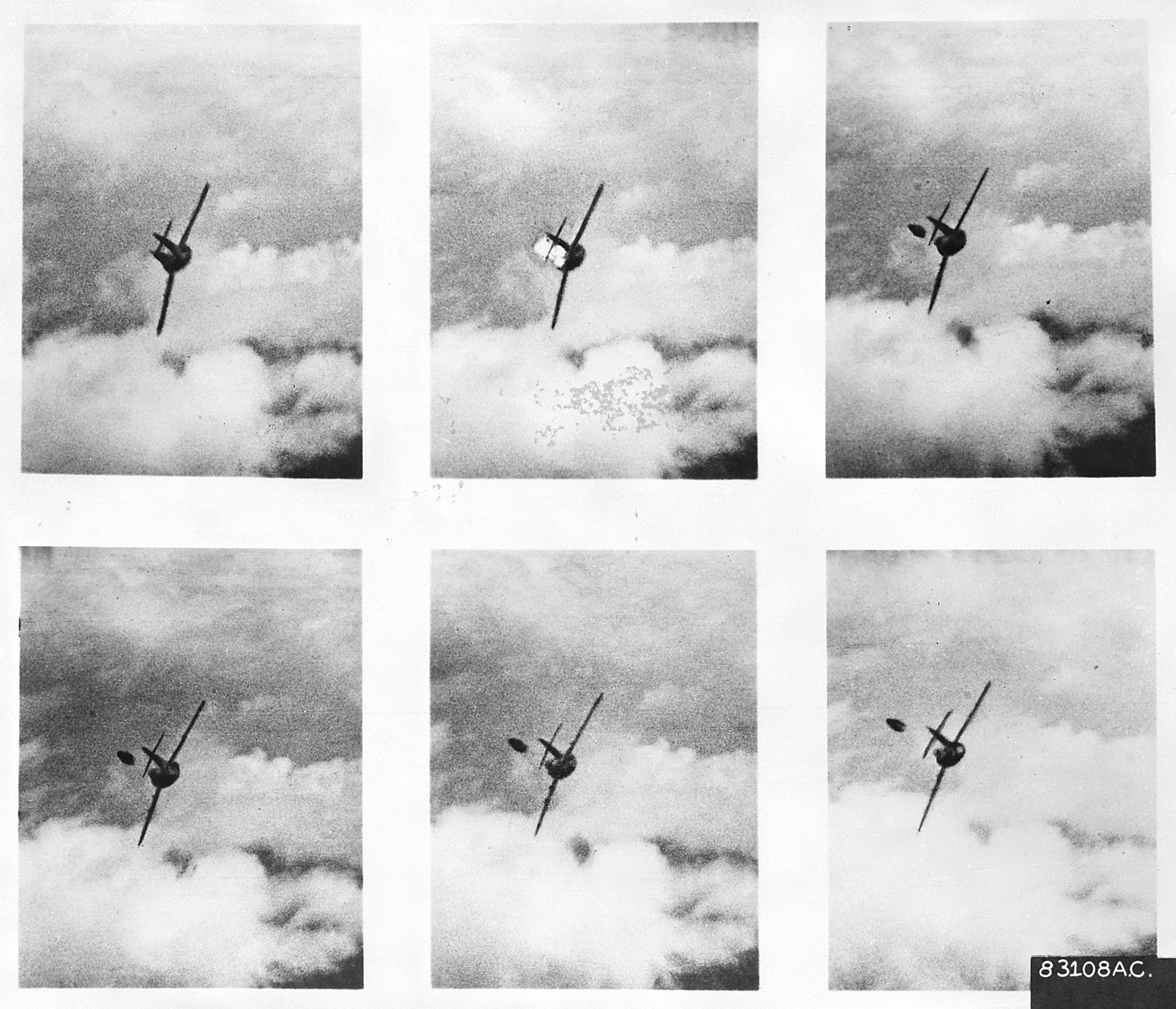
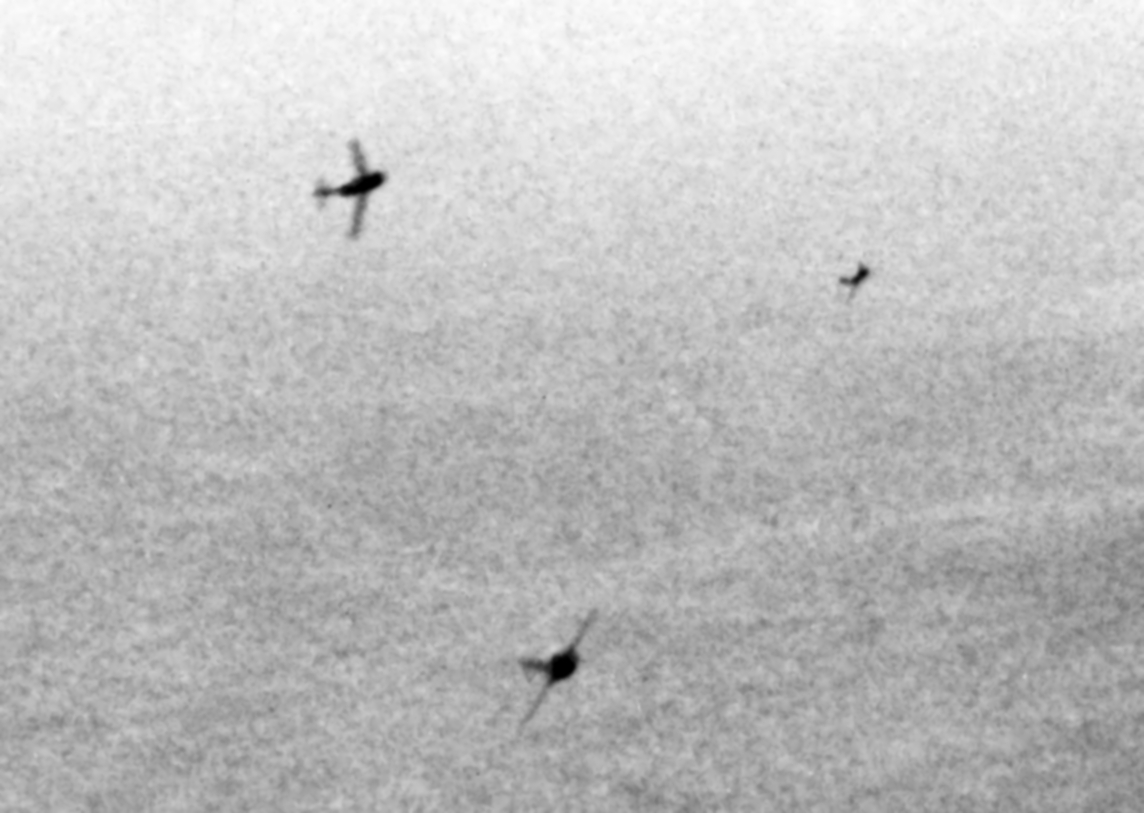
F-86 engaging a MiG-15 (left) and MiG-15s engaging a B-29 (right)

Dozens of aviators were credited as flying aces in the Korean War from 1950 to 1953. The number of total flying aces, who are credited with downing five or more enemy aircraft in air-to-air combat, is disputed in the war.

The Korean War saw the first widespread use of jet engine-powered fighter aircraft for both sides of a war. Subsequently, difficulty arose in crediting the number of victories for each side, thanks in part to poor records, intentional overestimation, and the difficulty of confirming crashes in MiG Alley, where the majority of air-to-air combat took place in the war. As a result, there is a large discrepancy on both sides as to the number of victories claimed versus aircraft lost, and it is extremely difficult to determine the accuracy of many victories. The ace status of dozens of pilots still remains in question.

Aviators from four nations may have qualified as aces during the Korean War; between six and nine aces have been estimated for China and up to four in North Korea. Pilots of the Soviet Union had the most difficulty confirming victories and accurately determining which pilots achieved ace status, and between 34 and 60 pilots from that nation have been postulated as possible aces in the war. For the United Nations, the United States was the only country with pilots to attain ace status, with 40. No pilot from another UN country attained ace status, though many claimed victories. Among these, Royal Canadian Air Force pilot Ernest A. Glover claimed three victories.

== Controversy ==
The status of many claimed aces in the Korean War has been increasingly debated as more data becomes available, showing that instances of over-claiming abounded on both sides.

An example of this occurred on 20 May 1951, when the war's largest fighter battle to date took place between 28 F-86 Sabres and 30 MiG-15s. After this battle the Americans claimed three MiGs (including two for James Jabara) and the Soviets claimed four Sabres (including one for Yevgeny Pepelyaev). In fact, each side lost only one aircraft.

The Americans claimed that Jabara was their first jet ace after the 20 May combat but, apart from the discrepancy on that date, he was also credited with a kill in a 12 April 1951 combat in which the Americans claimed a total of 11 MiGs shot down when the Soviets actually lost only one fighter. For their part, the Soviets claimed 15 Boeing B-29 kills on that date when the Americans only lost four in the combat itself and six written-off later.

Compounding the problem, both sides were using jet engine-powered fighter aircraft on a large scale for the first time, and the high speeds of combat made visual identification of damaged and destroyed aircraft difficult. USAF pilots were credited with a kill if the gun camera showed their guns striking the enemy aircraft even if no one actually saw it go down. After the war the USAF reviewed its figures in an investigation code-named Sabre Measure Charlie and downgraded the kill ratio of the North American F-86 Sabre against the Mikoyan-Gurevich MiG-15 by half. The Soviets also had lax standards for confirming kills at the beginning of the war, leading to widespread over-claiming. Both sides made extensive use of gun cameras to better track effectiveness, but Soviet cameras were less effective, further contributing to over-claiming.

Records from the United Nations show that 40 American pilots reached ace status. However, records from China, the Soviet Union, and North Korea conflict widely and accounts vary on how many aircraft on each side were lost and who is credited with the victories. Air victory claims, which are often controversial between two sides of a war, were particularly difficult to measure in Korea thanks to the difficulty recovering crashed aircraft and confirming losses, as well as poor records for the two sides which fought the bulk of their engagements in an area known as MiG Alley.

The number of aircraft lost during the war is in dispute among both the UN and the Soviet bloc nations. UN pilots claim 840 aircraft shot down during the war, while Chinese, Soviet, and North Korean sources indicate only 600 were lost among the three nations, including non-combat losses. Conversely, the Soviet Union sources claim to have shot down 800 UN aircraft, while the US claims to have lost only 100 aircraft in combat. Overestimation of victories on both sides has been attributed to the stress and confusion of air combat situations during the war, as well as the tendency for pilots to deliberately exaggerate claims for career advancement. Historians suggest that numbers in these nations were deliberately exaggerated for propaganda purposes and to appease their superiors. For example, Soviet pilots faced penalties for perceived failure or ineffectiveness, making inaccurate or false claims of victories more common. Conversely, data-matching with Soviet records shows that US pilots claimed up to 400 per cent more kills in some combats than they actually achieved, and that they routinely attributed their own combat losses to landing accidents and "other causes".

The Soviet bloc nations claim to have destroyed a combined total of between 1,000 and 1,600 UN aircraft in air-to-air combat, the most common number in sources being 1,106 UN aircraft total, including 651 F-86 Sabres. The most authoritative Soviet numbers indicate 1,016 UN aircraft, including 595 Sabres. Chinese sources claim an additional 330 victories, including 211 Sabres. The most common number used is a total of 271 victories for China and North Korea. Other, more recent works claim 1,337 UN aircraft.

During the entire course of the war, UN air forces lost about 3,000 aircraft. The United States Air Force (USAF) reported a total of 516 non-combat losses and 1,466 aircraft lost in combat missions, with 757 of them lost to enemy fire Of these 139 were destroyed in air-to-air combat, 305 were unknown causes and 472 were "other losses". Of these, just 78 Sabres were listed as lost in air-to-air combat, 26 were unknown causes and 61 were "other losses". The United States Navy and United States Marine Corps lost 1,248 aircraft to all causes and the other UN countries lost about 300 aircraft.

Tallying claims for the many Soviet pilots who claim to have achieved ace status is extremely difficult. The system of claims awards in the Soviet Union was unclear and appears to have been highly inconsistent during the war. There is also no single list of victories for each pilot in the Soviet Union, with numbers instead drawn from after action reports and accounts from pilots and unit leaders. These complications, in addition to the intentional exaggeration of kills in order to please superiors, means that the about 50 Soviet pilots claiming ace status have a total number of victories which far exceeds the number of aircraft the UN lost in the Korean War's air battles. Realizing the chronic problem with false claims, Soviet leaders began to tighten the criteria for confirming victories in 1952. As a result, far fewer Soviet pilots were made aces in the second half of the war.

Similarly, data-matching shows that US aces also over-claimed. For example, the US claimed that James Jabara became the world's first jet-versus-jet ace during his first tour of duty, but Soviet data shows he didn't achieve ace status until his second tour.

== List of aces ==
=== China ===
Various sources claim that between six and nine Chinese pilots attained ace status during the course of the war. A USAF report listed six Chinese pilots attained ace status during the Korean War. Although all Chinese aces have received the title Combat Hero in acknowledgement of their services, very little information is known of the Chinese pilots during the war due to the lack of published records.

This with the * indicates that the pilot was either killed in action or killed in a training event during the war.
This indicates that certain historians have expressed doubt regarding the ace status of the pilot listed.

Photo	Name	Service	Victories	Unit	Aircraft	Notes
	Zhao Baotong	PLAAF	7	3rd Fighter Aviation Division	MiG-15	First Chinese pilot to achieve ace status. Also known as Chao Bao Tun.
	Wang Hai	PLAAF	4-9	3rd Fighter Aviation Division	MiG-15	Although the USAF report listed Wang's nine victories, historian Zhang Xiaoming contended that only four victories were actual kills while other five were damages. Also known as Van Hai.
—	Li Han	PLAAF	8	4th Fighter Aviation Division	MiG-15	First Chinese pilot credited with shooting down a U.S. aircraft.
—	Lu Min	PLAAF	8	12th Fighter Aviation Division	MiG-15	Later purged due to alleged connections with Marshal Lin Biao's coup attempt against Mao Zedong.
	Fan Wanzhang*	PLAAF	8	3rd Fighter Aviation Division	MiG-15	Also known as Fan Van Chou. Killed in action on August 8, 1952.
	Sun Shenglu*	PLAAF	6	3rd Fighter Aviation Division	MiG-15	Killed in action on December 3, 1952 near the Ch'ongch'on River.
	Liu Yudi	PLAAF	0-6	3rd Fighter Aviation Division	MiG-15	Professor Xiaoming Zhang says Liu was credited with four victories during a single mission on November 23, 1951, but USAF records said only two F-84 were actually damaged with no aircraft lost. Yudi's name is not listed in the USAF report.
	Han Decai	PLAAF	6	43rd Regiment of the 15th Division	MiG-15	Credited with 5 "kills"; 4 Planes were shot down and 2 were damaged
	Guan-Lee Sing(施光礼)	PLAAF	4		MiG-15	
	Zhang Jihui	PLAAF	3-5		MiG-15	

=== North Korea ===
There is some controversy as to whether any pilots of the North Korean People's Air Force attained ace status. Various sources claim there were either zero, two or four aces from North Korea. Research by the USAF in 1999 concluded two North Korean pilots may have attained the status. However, historian Michael J. Varhola subsequently contended that Chinese and Soviet records indicate it is unlikely any North Korean pilots attained enough victories for ace status.

This with the * indicates that the pilot was either killed in action or killed in a training event during the war.
This indicates that certain historians have expressed doubt regarding the ace status of the pilot listed.

Name	Service	Victories	Unit	Aircraft	Notes
Kim Den Dek	KPAF	8	1st Air Division	MiG-15	Ace status disputed.
Kim Di San	KPAF	6	1st Air Division	MiG-15	Ace status disputed.

=== Soviet Union ===
Various sources claim between 43 and 60 pilots from the Soviet Union attained ace status in the war. Most sources claim around 50 pilots attained ace status during the Korean War, of whom many are very controversial. Research by the USAF named 52 pilots who may have had legitimate claim to the title. Little is known of some of the pilots and their combined tally is incompatible with the number of aircraft the USAF claims to have lost in the war. Subsequent independent sources generally agree the number of aces claimed was around 52, but 15 names differ among the lists, particularly lower-scoring pilots. The number of victories for virtually all of the ace pilots is subject to dispute. Listed are names of 67 Soviet pilots attributed as aces in various sources. Of these, the ace status of 30 are in question among historians.

This with the * indicates that the pilot was either killed in action or killed in a training event during the war.
This indicates that certain historians have expressed doubt regarding the ace status of the pilot listed.

Name	Rank	Victories	Unit	Aircraft	Notes
Nikolai Sutyagin	Major	22	17th Fighter Air Regiment, 523rd Fighter Air Regiment	MiG-15	The 'Ace of Aces' in the Korean War, with the highest number of kills for any pilot. Also holds the title for shooting down most jet fighters in history. Awarded Hero of the Soviet Union.
Yevgeny Pepelyaev	Colonel	19	196th Fighter Air Regiment	MiG-15	Awarded Hero of the Soviet Union. Most Russian sources credit Pepelyaev with 19 shootdowns, thought many western sources indicate 20 to 23. Of the issue, Pepelyaev claimed he was "absolutely sure" of only six of his victories, of which he had seen only two of the aircraft crash into the ground.
Lev Shchukin	Captain	15+2	18th Guards Fighter Air Regiment	MiG-15	
Alexander Smorchkov	Lieutenant colonel	12-15	523rd Fighter Air Regiment	MiG-15	
Dmitry Oskin	Major	14	523rd Fighter Air Regiment	MiG-15	Number of victories is disputed, and may be 11. Russian sources credit him with 16 solo and one shared victory.
Sergey Kramarenko	Captain	13-16	176th Guards Fighter Air Regiment	MiG-15	Awarded Hero of the Soviet Union. Scored between an estimated 3 shootdowns in World War II. Russian sources credit him with 16 shootdowns in the Korean War. He was the last living Soviet flying ace of the Korean War.
Mikhail Ponomaryev	Major	10-14	17th Fighter Air Regiment	MiG-15	Number of victories is disputed, and may be 11.Russian sources credit 10 shootdowns.
Konstantin Sheberstov	Major	12-13	176th Guards Fighter Air Regiment	MiG-15	Number of victories is disputed. In 1951, Sheberstov made a false claim on one of Yevgeny Pepelyaev's victories and was exposed, disgracing himself.
Stepan Bakhayev	Major	11-12	523rd Fighter Air Regiment	MiG-15	Russian sources credit him with 12 shootdowns.
Ivan Suchkov	Captain	10-12	176th Guards Fighter Regiment	MiG-15	Number of victories is disputed and may be 10.
Grigory Okhay	Captain	11	523rd Fighter Air Regiment	MiG-15	
Dmitry Samoilov	Senior lieutenant	10-11	523rd Fighter Air Regiment	MiG-15	Russian sources credit him with 11 shootdowns.
Pyotr Milaushkin	Captain	10	176th Guards Fighter Air Regiment	MiG-15	
Grigory Pulov	Lieutenant colonel	8-10	17th Fighter Air Regiment	MiG-15	Number is disputed, and may be 8.
Nikolai Dokashenko	Captain	9	17th Fighter Air Regiment	MiG-15	
Mikhail Mikhin	Captain	9	518th Fighter Air Regiment	MiG-15	Awarded Hero of the Soviet Union.
Serafim Subbotin	Major	9	176th Guards Fighter Air Regiment	MiG-15	Awarded Hero of the Soviet Union. Some sources claim Subbotin had up to 15 victories, though most sources indicate a tally of 9 or ten.
Vladimir Zabelin	Major	9	256th Fighter Air Regiment and 821st Fighter Air Regiment	MiG-15	
Grigory Ges	Captain	8	176th Guards Fighter Air Regiment	MiG-15	Some sources claim Ges may have had up to 10 victories, though most sources agree on 8.
Vladimir Alfeev	Captain	7	196th Fighter Air Regiment	MiG-15	Listed by independent sources.
Pavel Antonov	Major	7	18th Guards Fighter Air Regiment	MiG-15	Listed by independent sources but not the USAF report.
Nikolai Babonin	unknown	7	18th Guards Fighter Air Regiment	MiG-15	Listed by the USAF report but not independent sources.
Semyon Fedorets	Major	7	913th Fighter Air Regiment	MiG-15	
Lev Ivanov	Captain	7	196th Fighter Air Regiment	MiG-15	
Aleksandr Karasyov	Lieutenant colonel	7	523rd Fighter Air Regiment	MiG-15	Listed by independent sources but not the USAF report.
Aleksey Mitusov	Lieutenant colonel	7	196th Fighter Air Regiment	MiG-15	Listed by independent sources but not the USAF report.
Vasily Shulev	Captain	7	17th Fighter Air Regiment	MiG-15	Listed by independent sources but not the USAF report.
Nikolai Volkov	Captain	7	17th Fighter Air Regiment	MiG-15	Listed by independent sources but not the USAF report.
Ivan Zaplavnev	Captain	7	196th Fighter Air Regiment	MiG-15	
Stepan Artemchenko	Major	6	17th Fighter Air Regiment	MiG-15	Listed by independent sources but not the USAF report. Also claimed 6 kills in World War II.
Arkady Boitsov	Major	6	16th Fighter Air Regiment	MiG-15	Awarded Hero of the Soviet Union.
Boris Bokach	Captain	6	196th Fighter Air Regiment	MiG-15	
Vladimir Khvostontsev	unknown	6	unknown	MiG-15	Listed by the USAF report as an ace. Other sources credit him with three kills.
Nikolai Ivanov	unknown	6	726th Fighter Air Regiment	MiG-15	Listed by the USAF report but not independent sources.
Aleksey Kalyuzhny	Major	6	Fighter Air Regiment	MiG-15	Listed by independent sources but not the USAF report.
Anatoly Nikolayev	unknown	6	17th Fighter Air Regiment	MiG-15	Listed by the USAF report but not independent sources.
Pavel Nikulin	unknown	6	176th Guards Fighter Air Regiment	MiG-15	Listed by the USAF report as an ace. Other sources credit him with one kill.
Fyodor Shebanov*	Senior lieutenant	6	196th Fighter Air Regiment	MiG-15	Killed in action 29 October 1951.
Sergey Vishnyakov	Colonel	6	176th Guards Fighter Air Regiment	MiG-15	
Nikolai Zameskin	Major	6	878th Fighter Air Regiment	MiG-15	
Boris Abakumov	Captain	5	196th Fighter Air Regiment	MiG-15	
Anatoly Bashman	Major	5	148th Guards Fighter Air Regiment	MiG-15	
Vasily Belousov	unknown	5	324th Fighter Air Division (IAD), 303rd Fighter Air Division (IAD)	MiG-15	Listed by the USAF report but not independent sources.
Grigory Berelidze	Captain	5	224th Fighter Air Regiment	MiG-15	
Georgy Bogdanov	unknown	5	unknown	MiG-15	Listed by the USAF report but not independent sources.
Sergey Bychkov	Captain	5	17th Fighter Air Regiment	MiG-15	Listed by the USAF report but not the US Air Force.
Nikolai Gerasimenko	unknown	5	18th Guards Fighter Air Regiment	MiG-15	Listed by the USAF report but not independent sources.
Sergey Danilov	unknown	5	unknown	MiG-15	Listed by the USAF report but not independent sources.
Grigory Dmitryuk	Major	5-6	821st Fighter Air Regiment	MiG-15	Russian sources credit him with six kills.
Nikolai Goncharov	Captain	5	196th Fighter Air Regiment	MiG-15	Listed by independent sources but not the USAF report.
Anatoly Karelin	Major	5	351st Fighter Air Regiment, 303rd Fighter Air Division (IAD)	MiG-15	Awarded Hero of the Soviet Union.
Viktor Kolyadin	Lieutenant colonel	5	28th Guards Fighter Air Regiment	MiG-15	Listed by independent sources but not the USAF report.
Nikolai Korniyenko	Captain	5	18th Guards Fighter Air Regiment	MiG-15	
Aleksandr Kochegarov	unknown	5	196th Fighter Air Regiment	MiG-15	Listed by the USAF report but not independent sources.
Vasily Lepikov	unknown	5	415th Fighter Air Regiment	MiG-15	Listed by the USAF report but not independent sources.
Viktor Muravyov	Captain	5	196th Fighter Air Regiment	MiG-15	Listed by independent sources but not the USAF report.
Stepan Naumenko	Captain	5	29th Guards Fighter Air Regiment	MiG-15	First Soviet ace in the war, scoring his fifth kill on 24 December 1950.
Boris Obraztsov*	unknown	4-5	176th Guards Fighter Air Regiment	MiG-15	Killed in action. Listed by the USAF report as ace, but Russian sources credit him with only four shootdowns.
Afanasy Olenitsa	Major	5	821st Fighter Air Regiment	MiG-15	
Viktor Popov	Captain	5	523rd Fighter Air Regiment	MiG-15	Listed by independent sources but not the USAF report.
Aleksey Prudnikov	unknown	5	821st Fighter Air Regiment	MiG-15	Listed by the USAF report but not independent sources.
German Shatalov*	Senior lieutenant	5	523rd Fighter Air Regiment	MiG-15	Killed in action 28 November 1951. Listed by independent sources but not the USAF report.
Boris Siskov	Captain	5	224th Fighter Air Regiment	MiG-15	Final soviet ace of the war, scoring his fifth victory on July 20, 1953.
Nikolai Shelamanov	Captain	5	196th Fighter Air Regiment	MiG-15	
Vasily Stepanov	Senior lieutenant	5	18th Guards Fighter Air Regiment	MiG-15	Listed by independent sources but not the USAF report.
Nikolai Shkodin	unknown	5	147th Guards Fighter Air Regiment	MiG-15	The USAF report found Shkodin had been credited with 5 victories but could only confirm three of them. Independent sources do not list Shkodin on lists of aces.
Yevgeny Pomaz	Captain	2-11	494th Fighter Air Regiment	MiG-15	Listed by the USAF report but not considered ace by Russian sources, which indicate only 2 shootdowns.

=== United States ===
Of 40 United States military servicemen who attained ace status in Korea, all but one of them flew primarily the F-86 Sabre during their air-to-air fights. Early in the war against the older North Korean People's Air Force aircraft, US pilots flew a variety of aircraft including the F-51 Mustang, F-80 Shooting Star and F-82 Twin Mustang. However, with the introduction of the MiG-15 when the People's Liberation Army Air Force entered the war, only the Sabre fighter could match the Soviet-built fighters in single combat.

Similarly to the Chinese and Soviet aces, the kill totals of many American pilots are disputed. Their combined tally is incompatible with recorded losses by communist forces, and data-matching with Soviet records shows that many of the aces' claimed kills were erroneous. In some cases, American pilots over-claimed by 400 per cent after air combat.

The pilots who attained ace status in the war scored a disproportionate number of kills in the war. Of 1,000 fighter pilots who served in the war, only 355 were credited with aerial victories. A total of 756.5 victories were credited for aircraft shot down by the UN, with the 40 aces shooting down a total of 310.5 aircraft, or 40 percent of the total. The top five aces are credited with a combined ten percent of the UN aircraft victories of the war. In addition to the 40 pilots who attained ace status in the Korean War, another 17 US pilots who had been aces in World War II claimed additional kills in the Korean War. Two Canadian World War II aces, J. Lindsay and John McKay, also garnered additional kills in the war.

This with the * indicates that the pilot was either killed in action or killed in a training event during the war.

Photo	Name	Service	Rank	Victories	Unit	Aircraft	Notes
	Joseph C. McConnell	USAF	Captain	16	39th Fighter-Interceptor Squadron	F-86 Sabre	Was a B-24 Liberator navigator during World War II. Killed in a 1954 training accident.
	James Jabara	USAF	Major	15	334th Fighter-Interceptor Squadron	F-86 Sabre	America's first jet ace. Also claimed 1.5 kills (1 shared) flying a P-51 Mustang in World War II.
	Manuel J. "Pete" Fernandez	USAF	Captain	14.5 (1 Shared)	334th Fighter-Interceptor Squadron	F-86 Sabre	Killed in a 1980 aircraft crash.
	George A. Davis*	USAF	Major	14	334th Fighter-Interceptor Squadron	F-86 Sabre	Shot down 10 February 1952. His death generated controversy between China and the Soviet Union, in which both MiG pilots Zhang Jihui and Mikhail Averin had claimed to be his assailant. Received the Medal of Honor for his actions and posthumously promoted to the rank of lieutenant colonel. Also claimed 7 kills in the P-47 Thunderbolt in World War II.
	Royal N. "King" Baker	USAF	Colonel	13	48th Fighter Group	F-86 Sabre	Also claimed 3.5 kills (1 shared) in World War II.
	Frederick C. "Boots" Blesse	USAF	Major	10	334th Fighter-Interceptor Squadron	P-51 Mustang; F-80 Shooting Star; F-86 Sabre	"No Guts, No Glory"
	Harold E. Fischer	USAF	First Lieutenant	10	39th Fighter-Interceptor Squadron	F-86 Sabre	Shot down and captured in China on April 7, 1953.
	James K. Johnson	USAF	Colonel	10	335th Fighter-Interceptor Squadron	F-86 Sabre	Also claimed 1 kill in World War II.
	Lonnie R. Moore	USAF	Captain	10	335th Fighter-Interceptor Squadron	F-86 Sabre	Killed in a 1956 aircraft crash.
	Ralph Parr	USAF	Captain	10	335th Fighter-Interceptor Squadron	F-86 Sabre	
	Vermont Garrison	USAF	Lieutenant Colonel	10	335th Fighter-Interceptor Squadron	F-86 Sabre	Also claimed 7.3 kills (1 Shared among three pilots) in World War II
	Cecil G. Foster	USAF	Captain	9	16th Fighter-Interceptor Squadron	F-86 Sabre	
	James F. Low	USAF	First Lieutenant	9	335th Fighter-Interceptor Squadron	F-86 Sabre	
	James P. Hagerstrom	USAF	Major	8.5 (1 Shared)	334th Fighter-Interceptor Squadron, 67th Fighter-Bomber Squadron	F-86 Sabre	Also claimed 6 kills in World War II.
	James Robinson "Robbie" Risner	USAF	Major	8	336th Fighter-Interceptor Squadron	F-86 Sabre	
	George I. Ruddell	USAF	Lieutenant Colonel	8	39th Fighter-Interceptor Squadron	F-86 Sabre	
	Henry Buttelmann	USAF	First Lieutenant	7	25th Fighter-Interceptor Squadron	F-86 Sabre	Was the youngest American ace of the war, claiming 5 victories in 12 days.
	Clifford D. Jolley	USAF	Captain	7	335th Fighter-Interceptor Squadron	F-86 Sabre	
—	Leonard W. Lilley	USAF	Captain	7	334th Fighter-Interceptor Squadron	F-86 Sabre	
	Donald E. Adams*	USAF	Major	6.5 (1 Shared)	16th Fighter-Interceptor Squadron	F-86 Sabre	Killed in an airshow crash on August 30, 1952.
	Francis S. "Gabby" Gabreski	USAF	Colonel	6.5 (1 Shared)	4th Fighter-Interceptor Wing, 51st Fighter-Interceptor Wing	F-86 Sabre	Also claimed 28 kills in World War II.
	George L. Jones	USAF	Lieutenant Colonel	6.5 (1 Shared)	335th Fighter-Interceptor Squadron, 51st Fighter-Interceptor Wing	F-86 Sabre	
	Winton W. Marshall	USAF	Major	6.5 (1 Shared)	335th Fighter-Interceptor Squadron	F-86 Sabre	
	John F. Bolt	USMC	Major	6	39th Fighter-Interceptor Squadron	F-86 Sabre	Also claimed 6 kills in World War II.
	James H. Kasler	USAF	First Lieutenant	6	335th Fighter-Interceptor Squadron	F-86 Sabre	
	Robert J. Love	USAF	Captain	6	335th Fighter-Interceptor Squadron	F-86 Sabre	
	William T. Whisner	USAF	Major	5.5 (1 Shared)	334th Fighter-Interceptor Squadron, 25th Fighter-Interceptor Squadron	F-86 Sabre	Also claimed 16.4 kills in World War II
	Robert P. Baldwin	USAF	Colonel	5	16th Fighter-Interceptor Squadron, 25th Fighter-Interceptor Squadron, 39th Fighter-Interceptor Squadron	F-86 Sabre	
—	Richard S. Becker	USAF	Captain	5	334th Fighter-Interceptor Squadron	F-86 Sabre	
	Stephen L. Bettinger	USAF	Major	5	336th Fighter-Interceptor Squadron	F-86 Sabre	Also claimed 1 kill in World War II. Was the final American ace of the war with his final victory claimed on July 20, 1953. Was subsequently shot down and taken prisoner.
	Guy Bordelon	USN	Lieutenant (navy)	5	Composite Squadron 3	F4U-5NL Corsair	Only US Navy aviator to be awarded ace status.
—	Richard D. Creighton	USAF	Major	5	336th Fighter-Interceptor Squadron	F-86 Sabre	
	Clyde A. Curtin	USAF	Captain	5	335th Fighter-Interceptor Squadron	F-86 Sabre	
—	Ralph D. "Hoot" Gibson	USAF	Colonel	5	335th Fighter-Interceptor Squadron	F-86 Sabre]	
	Iven C. Kincheloe	USAF	Captain	5	25th Fighter-Interceptor Squadron	F-86 Sabre	Killed in a 1958 aircraft crash.
	Robert T. Latshaw	USAF	Captain	5	335th Fighter-Interceptor Squadron	F-86 Sabre	
	Robert H. Moore	USAF	Captain	5	336th Fighter-Interceptor Squadron, 16th Fighter-Interceptor Squadron	F-86 Sabre	
	Dolphin D. Overton	USAF	Captain	5	16th Fighter-Interceptor Squadron	F-86 Sabre	Attained Ace status in the shortest time of any American pilot in the war with five victories in four days.
	Harrison R. Thyng	USAF	Colonel	5	335th Fighter-Interceptor Squadron, 4th Fighter-Interceptor Wing	F-86 Sabre	Also claimed 5 kills in World War II. Credited to have shot down pilots of more nationalities of any American ace, with victories against Nazi Germany, Vichy France and the Empire of Japan.
	William Westcott	USAF	Major	5	25th Fighter-Interceptor Squadron, 51st Fighter-Interceptor Wing	F-86 Sabre	
	Charles G. Cleveland	USAF	First Lieutenant	5	334th Fighter-Interceptor Squadron	F-86 Sabre	Fifth victory was not recognized by the US Air Force until 2008. He was the last living American flying ace of the Korean War.
