= Smorchkov =

Smorchkov (Russian: Сморчков, from сморчок, a morel) is a Russian masculine surname, its feminine counterpart is Smorchkova. It may refer to

- Alexander Smorchkov (1919–1998), Soviet military pilot
- Vladimir Smorchkov (born 1980), Russian weightlifter
