= Boytsov =

Boytsov (masculine, Russian: Бойцов) or Boytsova (feminine, Russian: Бойцова) is a Russian surname. Notable people with the surname include:

- Denis Boytsov (1986–2026), Russian boxer
- Arkady Boytsov (1923–2000), Russian Soviet Korean War flying ace
