= Robert J. Love =

American flying ace (1917–1986)

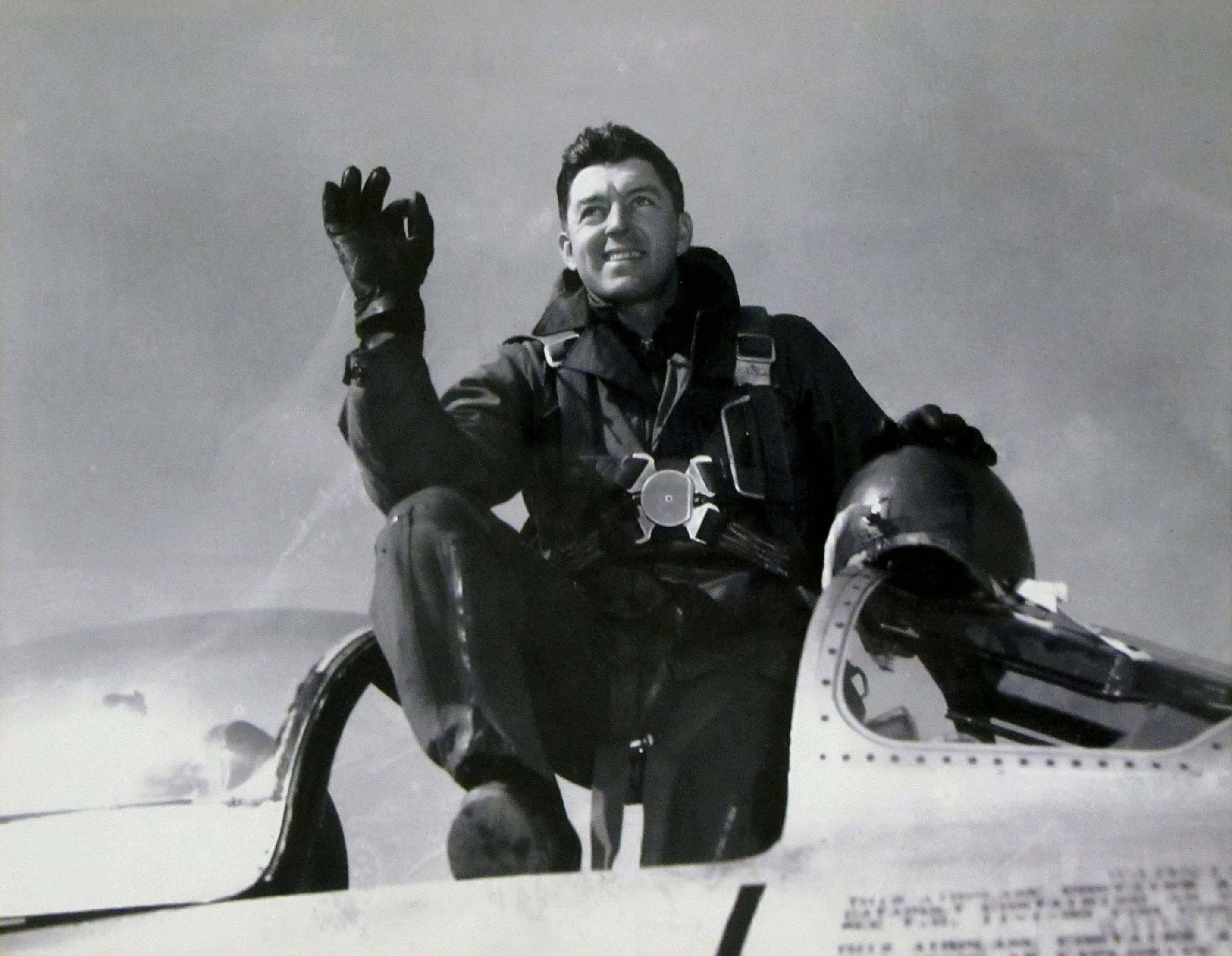
- Love with his F-86 Sabre in Korea
- Born: December 28, 1917; Grande Prairie, Canada
- Died: December 6, 1986 (aged 68); California, United States
- Military career
- Allegiance: Canada; United States; El Salvador
- Branch: Royal Canadian Air Force; United States Army Air Forces; California Air National Guard; United States Air Force; Salvadoran Air Force (Mercenary)
- Service years: 1940–1964, 1969
- Rank: Major
- Nickname: Bob
- Commands: 196th Fighter Interceptor Squadron; 8196th Replacement Training Squadron; 8196th Air Base Squadron
- Conflicts: World War II; Korean War; Soccer War (Mercenary)
- Awards: Silver Star; Distinguished Flying Cross; Air Medal (5)

Robert John Love (December 28, 1917 – December 6, 1986) was a test pilot and fighter pilot. He married Bernice Baxter. Also was a United States Air Force flying ace during the Korean War, shooting down six MiG-15 jet aircraft in 1952. He was assigned to the 4th Fighter-Interceptor Wing's 335th Fighter-Interceptor Squadron. In 1969 he was one of the pilots hired by the air force of El Salvador during the Soccer War between that country and Honduras, where he flew a P-51 Mustang.

== See also ==
- List of Korean War flying aces
