= Semyon Fedorets =

Semyon Alekseyevich Fedorets
- Семён Александрович Федорец
- Born: 18 February 1921; Yekaterinoslav, Ukrainian SSR
- Died: 2002 (aged 80–81); Kharkiv, Ukraine
- Military career
- Allegiance: Soviet Union
- Branch: Soviet Air Force
- Service years: 1941 – 1968
- Rank: Lieutenant colonel
- Unit: 913th Fighter Aviation Regiment
- Conflicts: Korean War
- Awards: Order of Lenin

Semyon Alekseyevich Fedorets (Russian: Семён Александрович Федорец; 18 February 1921 – 2002) was a MiG-15 pilot of the Soviet Union. He was a flying ace during the Korean War, with 7 victories.

== Career ==
In 1941, Fedorets graduated from Dnipropetrovsk Aeroclub and entered the Military Aviation School in Odesa. After graduation, he was sent to the Leningrad Front as part of the 403rd Fighter Aviation Regiment. Young pilots were only allowed to participate in combat operations by May 1944, and by then the front moved away from Leningrad. Thus, he did not actually participate in the battles of the Great Patriotic War.

After the war, in September 1949, he was transferred to the airfield Voskresensk in the Russian Far East. In April 1952, his unit was sent to an airfield in Anshan city, China. On 17 December 1952, Fedorets shot down his first F-86 Sabre. On 19 February 1953, he was appointed as squadron commander in the 913th Fighter Regiment of the 32nd Fighter Aviation Division.

Throughout his deployment in the Korean War, he flew 98 combat sorties, engaged in 40 dogfights, and shot down seven enemy aircraft.

He was also shot down (over the Yellow sea?) by Captain Joseph McConnell of the US 39th Fighter Interceptor Squadron in F86F-15 51-12971 (FU-971).

== See also ==
- List of Korean War flying aces
