= Stepan Naumenko =

Soviet flying ace (1920–2004)

Stepan Ivanovich Naumenko
- Степан Иванович Науменко
- Born: 7 January 1920; Zlynka village, Kherson Governorate, Russian Empire (located within present-day Ukraine)
- Died: 20 November 2004 (aged 84); Podolsk, Russia
- Military career
- Allegiance: Soviet Union
- Branch: Soviet Air Force
- Service years: 1937 – 1961
- Rank: Colonel
- Unit: 234th Fighter Aviation Regiment
- Conflicts: World War II; Korean War
- Awards: Hero of the Soviet Union

Stepan Ivanovich Naumenko (Russian: Степан Иванович Науменко, Ukrainian: Степан Іванович Науменко; 7 January 1920 – 20 November 2004) was a Soviet MiG-15 pilot during the Korean War, credited as the first Soviet ace in the conflict. Estimates of his number of victories range from two to six, although most indicate five.

== Early life ==
Naumenko was born on 7 January 1920 to a Ukrainian family in Zlynka village, Kirovgrad oblast. After completing his ninth grade of school in 1935 he worked at a labor colony in Odessa before entering the military in 1937. In 1939 he graduated from the K.E.Voroshilov Leningrad Military Aviation Technical school and went on to work at the 2nd Chakalovsky Aviation Institute as a technician. In November 1942 he became a mechanic in the 615th Night Bomber Aviation Regiment, based in the Volga Military District. In the early part of the war with Germany he was a mechanic, but in April 1942 he was sent for training to become a pilot.

Initially he studied at the 6th Voronezh Aviation School and in September he began studies at the Burma Military Aviation School of Pilots, which he completed in 1943. However, he did not return to the front until November 1944 since attended command courses after flight school. Upon his return to the front he became a flight commander in the 195th Fighter Aviation Regiment, but he did not see combat in the war. After the capitulation of Nazi Germany he transferred to the 29th Guards Fighter Aviation Regiment, which was sent to China in October 1950.

== Korean War ==
On 4 December 1950 Naumenko made his first sortie, and that afternoon he was credited with shooting down two F-80s. In the dogfight he used sharp vertical climb techniques to out-maneuver the F-80s, which could not climb as sharply and hence ended up falling into his gunfire. Two days later he shot down a B-29 bomber while flying at an altitude of 6,000 meters; when he and his flight crew found a group of five B-29s, they opened fire. They saw one get catch fire and go down, and the other four bombers tried to get away from the fighters. Two of those bombers were hit, but the MiGs did not continue to pursue them due to fuel shortages. After analysis of post-flight data, the mission was credited with taking out three B-29s, of which one was credited to Naumenko.

On 9 December he flew in a mission to seek out enemy aircraft, during which his group of jets was attacked by F-80s. However, they managed to dodge the initial attack by climbing sharply. After returning to engage the F-80s, lieutenant Serafim Volodkin lagged behind the rest of the jets, and as a result separated from his wingman Ivan Grechko. With the F-80s at a moment of strategic advantage, they rushed in to target Volodkin, who was saved by Grechko coming to his aid. After the intense dogfight the F-80s eventually disengaged. Later combats would be even more difficult due to increased US aviation presence. The next day he engaged F-80s attacking a Sensen railway station, but was soon forced to temporarily disengage after entering an unequal battle, having made several mistakes in the initial attack. When he turned around to attack the F-80 again, he managed to get a hit, but he had to leave due to a fuel shortage. No remnants of the F-80 he attacked were found, so it was not considered to be an aerial victory.

On 14 December he flew in a dogfight the resulted in one of his subordinates claiming an F-84, but it was not until 24 December that Naumenko himself scored his next aerial victory, likely due to poor weather or American aircraft having improved tactics to avoid the MiG-15. That day was also the first time Naumenko engaged with F-86 fighters, Earlier on 17 December Americans engaged the new F-86 against MiGs in combat for the first time, since the 4th Fighter Wing had just arrived in the South. As a result, flight inspection Yefromeenko from the 50th Fighter Aviation Division was shot down and forced to parachute out. During the dogfight on 24 December, Naumenko was able to position himself 800 meters behind a F-86 and opened fire, gaining his fifth shootdown in the war. The pilot, Donald George, became missing in action While attacking that plane, an F-86 tried to attack squadron commander Pavel Orlov, and Naumenko soon rushed to his defense and fended off the F-86s, which were forced to retreat. That day many pilots in his regiment had to fly multiple sorties, including Naumenko, and later that day he was credited with another shootdown – either an unidentified F-86 or the F-84E piloted by Roger W. Bascom. He continued to fly in combat until late January 1951 and engaged several more intense aerial combats, but did not claim any more aerial victories. In total he flew about 50 sorties and engaged in 10 dogfights, officially claiming five solo aerial victories.

American records differ on the number of shootdowns he had. Based on American loss listings and Soviet claims, Naumenko had two confirmed plus two probable aerial victories. While Soviet records claim he and his colleagues took out three B-29s on 6 December, American records claim that only one B-29 was lost after it made an emergency landing with serious damage. Two other pilots also claimed B-29s from that flight, so it is unclear if that specific decommissioned B-29 was brought down by Naumenko or someone else. The 8th Fighter Bomber Squadron claimed to have lost one F-80 on 10 December, when Naumenko claimed to have hit an F-80 but was not credited with an aerial victory by Soviet records; however, lieutenant Glinsky also claimed to have shot down an F-80 that day. The first shootdown he claimed on 24 December matches up with the American loss report for the F-86A piloted by Donald George, and the second plane he claimed that day was initially believed to be another F-86, but based on corresponding records it was more likely to have been F-84E No. 49-2422, piloted by second lieutenant Roger Bascom. From the 522nd Fighter Escort Squadron. However, a listing compiled by historians at the Air War College of the USAF credits him with 5. Most Russian sources credit Naumenko with five shootdowns.

== Postwar ==
Not long after leaving the warfront in early 1951, he was awarded the title Hero of the Soviet Union on 12 May 1951 for his actions in Korea. In May 1952 he entered the Lipetsk Higher Officer Flight Tactical Courses and graduated in October. In December that year he became a squadron commander in the 234th Fighter Aviation Regiment in the Moscow Military District, and in February 1953 he was promoted to assistant commander of combat tactics in the 32nd Guards Fighter Aviation Regiment. In 1957 he was made deputy commander of flight training within the same regiment, and after being promoted to senior deputy commander of the unit in 1958 he rose up through the ranks to regimental commander in September 1959. After leaving the military in March 1961 he worked as a physics teacher before he died in Podolsk on 20 November 2004.

== Awards ==
USSR

- Hero of the Soviet Union (12 May 1951)
- Order of Lenin (12 May 1951)
- Order of the Red Banner (22 February 1955)
- Order of the Patriotic War 1st class (11 March 1985)
- Two Order of the Red Star (3 November 1953 and 29 April 1954)
- Medal "For Battle Merit" (20 June 1949)
- Medal of Zhukov
- Medal "For the Defence of Moscow" (1944)
- Medal "For the Victory over Germany in the Great Patriotic War 1941–1945" (1945)
- jubilee medals

Foreign

- Medal of Sino-Soviet Friendship, (China)
- Order of Freedom and Independence, 2nd class (North Korea)

== See also ==
- List of Korean War flying aces
