= Konstantin Sheberstov =

Soviet Korean War flying ace (1919–1953)

Konstantin Yakovlevich Sheberstov
- Константин Яковлевич Шеберстов
- Born: 14 March 1919
- Died: 23 March 1953 (aged 34)
- Military career
- Allegiance: Soviet Union
- Branch: Soviet Air Force
- Service years: 1939 – 1953
- Rank: Major
- Unit: 176th Guards Fighter Aviation Regiment
- Conflicts: World War II; Korean War
- Awards: Order of the Red Banner

Konstantin Yakovlevich Sheberstov (Russian: Константин Яковлевич Шеберстов; 14 March 1919 – 23 March 1953) was a MiG-15 pilot of the Soviet Union. In World War II he is credited with shooting down 2 FW-190s. He was a flying ace during the Korean war, with around 12-13 victories. His number of victories is disputed. In 1951, he allegedly made a false claim on one of Yevgeny Pepelyaev's victories and was exposed, disgracing himself. On 23 March 1953, he died in a mid-air collision over Oreshkovo airfield (located in Voroynsk village, Babyninsky District, Kaluga Oblast).

== See also ==
- List of Korean War flying aces
