= Clifford D. Jolley =

American pilot and architect (1921–1995)

Clifford Dale Jolley
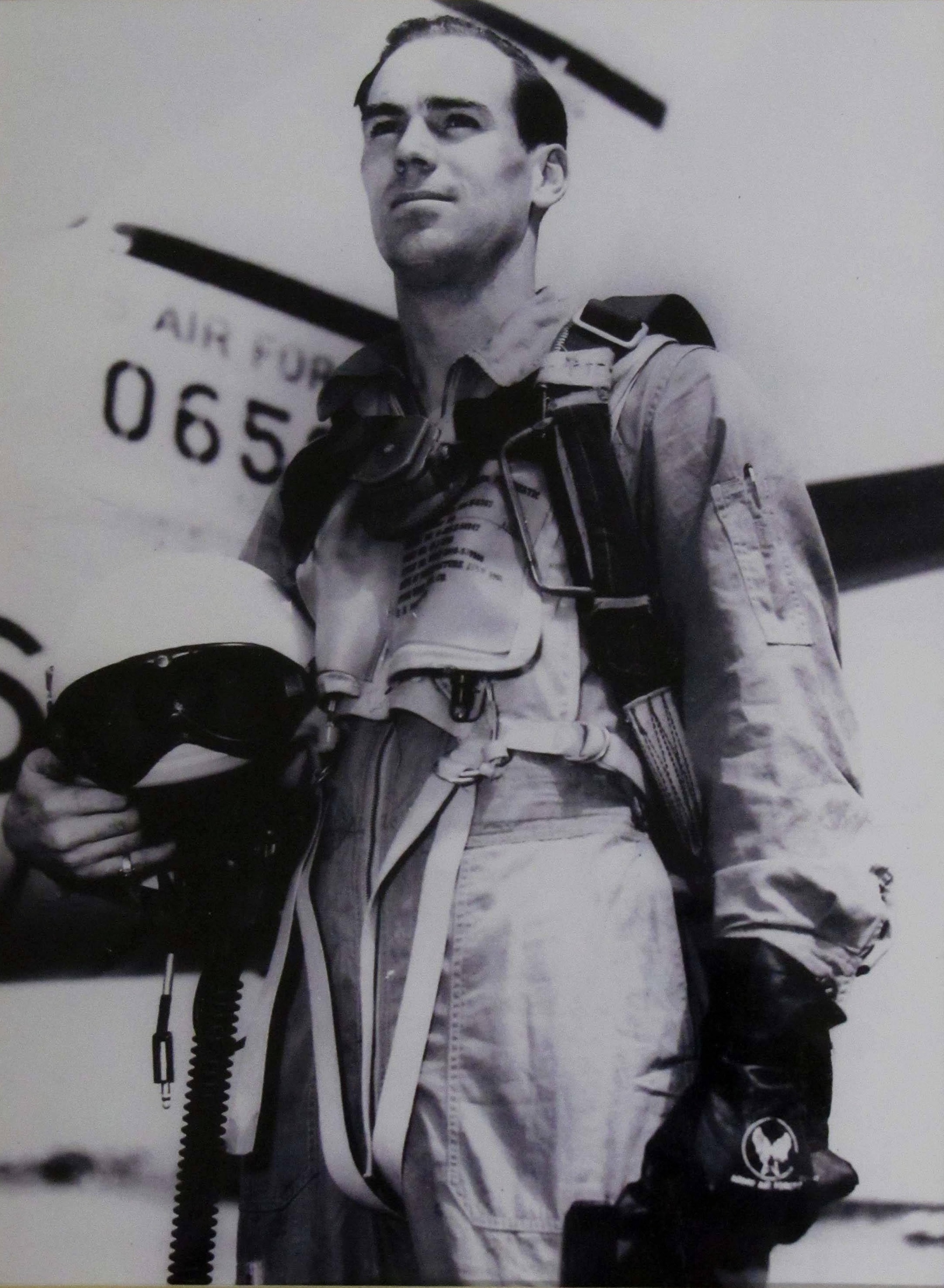
- Born: May 4, 1921; Cleveland, Ohio, U.S.
- Died: July 13, 1995 (aged 74); Bountiful, Utah, U.S.
- Burial place: Bountiful Memorial Park; Bountiful, Utah, U.S.
- Military career
- Allegiance: United States
- Branch: United States Army Air Forces; United States Air Force; Utah Air National Guard
- Service years: 1941–1966
- Rank: Lieutenant Colonel
- Units: 343rd Fighter Group; 4th Fighter-Interceptor Wing
- Conflicts: World War II; Korean War
- Awards: Silver Star; Distinguished Flying Cross (4); Purple Heart; Air Medal (3)

Clifford Dale Jolley (May 4, 1921 – July 13, 1995) was a fighter pilot in the United States Air Force and the first Air National Guard pilot to become a flying ace during the Korean War.

== Early life ==
Jolley was born on May 4, 1921, in Cleveland, Ohio.

== Military career ==
In 1941, Jolley enlisted in the United States Army Air Corps. In 1942, after completion of flight training, Jolley received his pilot wings and commission as second lieutenant in the United States Army Air Forces. He was then assigned as a Curtiss P-40 Warhawk and Lockheed P-38 Lightning pilot with the 18th Fighter Squadron of the 343rd Fighter Group in Alaska, where he flew combat missions in the Aleutian Islands campaign during World War II.

Upon his return home after completion of his combat duty, Jolley served as an airplane mechanic and flight instructor in California. He briefly served in the California Air National Guard, where he completed his training in jet aircraft and served as gunnery instructor. In 1948, he began flying the Lockheed F-80 Shooting Stars and North American F-86 Sabres. He then moved to Utah, where he joined the Utah Air National Guard in 1949. He toured with Utah Air National Guard in air demonstrations across the United States until 1952, when the Utah Air National Guard was activated for the Korean War.

=== Korean War ===
In 1952, Jolley was assigned as a F-86 pilot with the 335th Fighter-Interceptor Squadron of the 4th Fighter-Interceptor Wing at Kimpo Air Base in South Korea during the Korean War. On May 4, 1952, on his 31st birthday, Jolley shot down his first MiG-15. On July 4, 1952, he scored his second aerial victory of the Korean War when he shot down a MiG-15 while protecting fighter-bombers over Korea. During the aerial battle, his aircraft was hit by enemy fire from MiG-15, resulting him being wounded and his aircraft damaged. Low on fuel and flying a heavily damaged aircraft, Jolley attempted to assist his wingman after receiving a distress call before he and his wingman ejected from their aircraft and then landed into the Yellow Sea. Jolley's wingman was killed following ejection while Jolley was briefly apprehended by North Korean soldiers before he was released following the soldiers' brief confrontation with the USAF crew of the H-5 rescue helicopter. For his heroism in the mission, Jolley received the Silver Star.

Jolley continued to fly further missions after his rescue. On August 7, Jolley downed two MiG-15s in a single mission and on the following day, during aerial patrol over MiG Alley, he shot down his fifth MiG-15, becoming the 18th American jet ace of the Korean War and the first from the National Guard. On September 15 and October 11, Jolley shot down his sixth and seventh MiG-15s, his final aerial victories.

During the war, Jolley scored seven aerial victories and 13 more probable. He flew F-86 bearing the name 'Jolley Roger' with Jolly Roger flag painted on it.

=== Post war ===
After his service in Korea, Jolley became the operations officer for the 191st Fighter Squadron in the Utah National Guard. He later became a test pilot for Northrop Corporation. His flying career came to an end after he was diagnosed with diabetes at the age 33. Jolley remained in the Air National Guard until 1966, retiring at the rank of lieutenant colonel.

== Later life ==
Jolly married Mildred Pack on 1943. The couple had seven children. Following his military career, Jolley worked as an architect and designer. Later he owned a construction company, worked as a director of design for Boise Cascade and for the architecture department of the Church of Jesus Christ of Latter-day Saints.

Jolley died on July 13, 1995, at his home in Bountiful, Utah, following complications from a brain tumor.

== Awards ==

USAF Command Pilot Badge
Silver Star		Distinguished Flying Cross with three bronze oak leaf clusters
Purple Heart	Air Medal with two bronze oak leaf clusters	American Campaign Medal
Asiatic–Pacific Campaign Medal with bronze campaign star	World War II Victory Medal	National Defense Service Medal
Korean Service Medal with bronze campaign star	Air Force Longevity Service Award with three bronze oak leaf clusters	Armed Forces Reserve Medal with bronze hourglass device
Republic of Korea Presidential Unit Citation	United Nations Service Medal for Korea	Korean War Service Medal

=== Silver Star citation ===
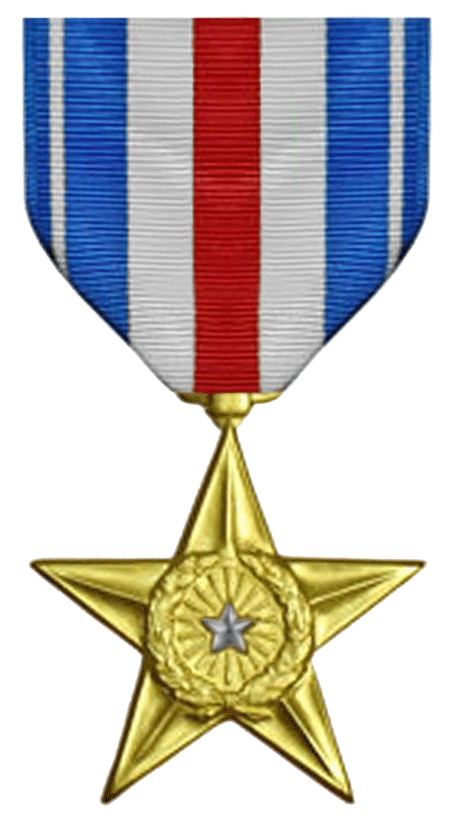

Jolley, Clifford D.
Captain, U.S. Air Force
335th Fighter-Interceptor Squadron, 4th Fighter-Interceptor Wing, Fifth Air Force
Date of Action: July 4, 1952

Citation:

The President of the United States of America, authorized by Act of Congress July 9, 1918, takes pleasure in presenting the Silver Star to Captain Clifford Dale Jolley, United States Air Force, for gallantry in action against an enemy of the United Nations while serving as Pilot of an F-86 Sabrejet Fighter-Bomber of the 335th Fighter-Interceptor Squadron, 4th Fighter-Interceptor Group, Fifth Air Force, on 4 July 1952 in Korea. Leading a flight of F-86s protecting friendly Fighter-Bombers in the Sakchu area, Captain Jolley sighted two MiGs and, positioning himself, damaged one of them before they escaped across the Yalu River. Later, Over Sinuiju, Captain Jolley was attacked by four MiGs, during which time he was wounded and his aircraft damaged. However, he regained control, destroyed one MiG that was attacking his wingman, and drove off another. A few minutes later, Captain Jolley damaged another MiG in a brief encounter. While proceeding out to sea he received a distress call from his wingman. Captain Jolley immediately made a 180 degree turn to his wingman’s aid despite the face that he was wounded, and his aircraft badly damaged and very low on fuel. Before overtaking his wingman he was advised the wingman had headed safely out to sea, so Captain Jolley returned to a friendly island, bailed out, and was rescued by friendly aircraft. As a direct result of his superlative airmanship and quick thinking, one MiG was destroyed, two MiGs critically damaged, and he diverted a fierce enemy attack on his wingman in the second encounter of the day. Through his heroic gallantry in action against determined enemy opposition, Captain Jolley reflected the highest credit upon himself and the military service. Great credit upon himself, the Far East Air Forces, and the United States Air Force.

== See also ==
- List of Korean War flying aces
