= Stephen L. Bettinger =

- Born: April 28, 1924; Newark, New Jersey, U.S.
- Died: December 4, 2010 (aged 86); Kirkland, Washington, U.S.
- Military career
- Allegiance: United States
- Branch: United States Army Air Forces; United States Air Force
- Service years: 1942–1973
- Rank: Colonel
- Conflicts: World War II; Korean War
- Awards: Silver Star; Legion of Merit; Distinguished Flying Cross (3); Bronze Star Medal; Air Medal (7); Air Force Commendation Medal; Croix de guerre (France)

Stephen L. Bettinger (April 28, 1924 – December 4, 2010) was a United States Air Force flying ace during the Korean War, credited with shooting down five enemy aircraft.

Bettinger also claimed 1 kill in World War II. He was the final American ace of the Korean War with his final victory claimed on July 20, 1953. He was subsequently shot down and taken prisoner.

== See also ==
- List of Korean War flying aces
