= James K. Johnson =

American flying ace (1916–1997)

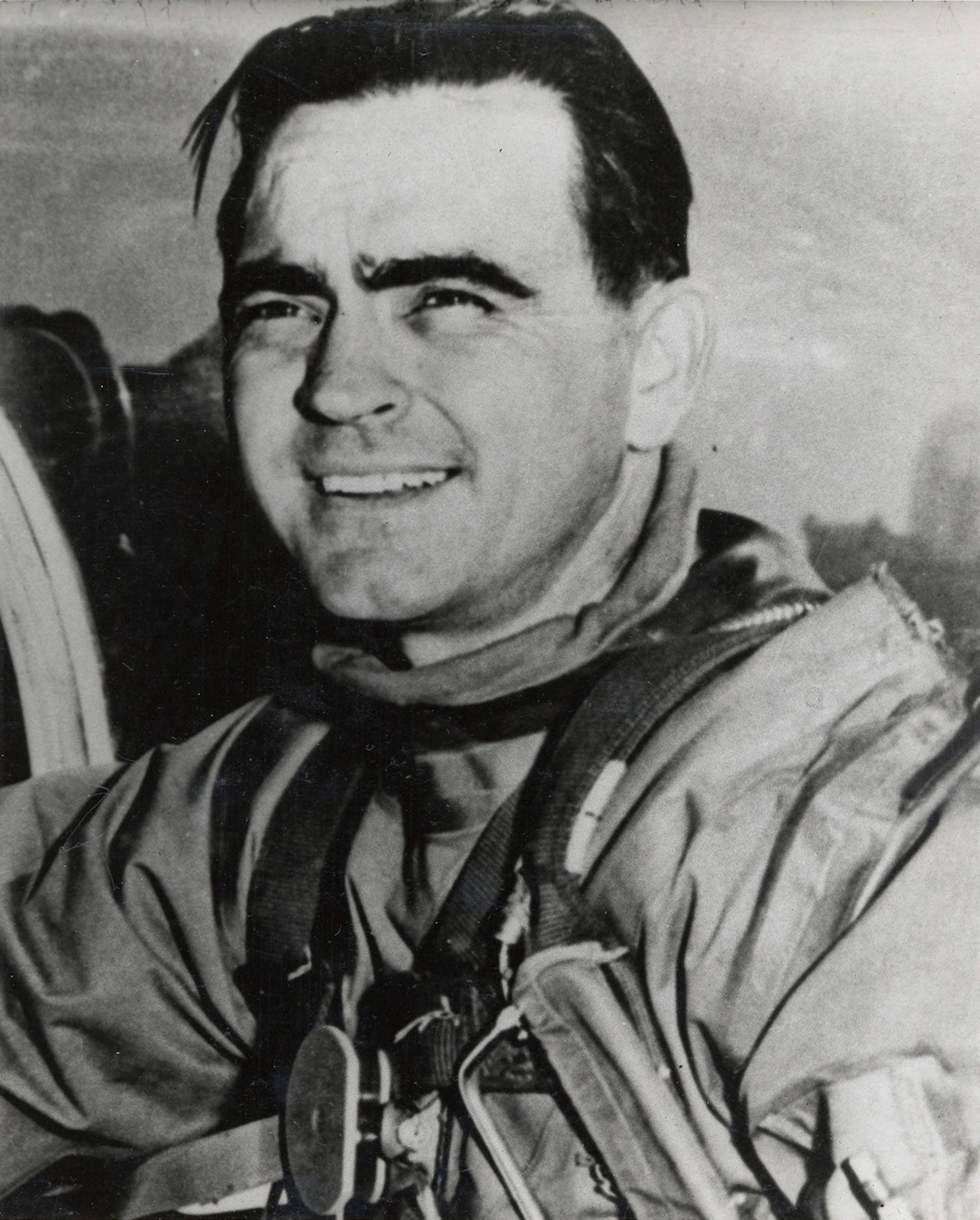
- James K. Johnson in 1952 or 1953
- Nickname: "The Mayor of Sabre Jet City"
- Born: May 30, 1916; Phoenix, Arizona
- Died: August 22, 1997 (aged 81)
- Buried: Arlington National Cemetery
- Allegiance: United States
- Branch: United States Army Air Forces; United States Air Force
- Service years: 1939–1963
- Rank: Colonel
- Commands: 43rd Bomber Wing (1960–61); 3958th Operational Test and Evaluation Group (1959–60); 55th Strategic Reconnaissance Wing (1956–59); 4th Fighter-Interceptor Wing (1952–53); Nellis Air Force Base (1951–52); 48th Fighter-Bomber Group (1944–45)
- Conflicts: World War II; Korean War
- Awards: Distinguished Service Cross; Silver Star; Legion of Merit (2); Distinguished Flying Cross (2); Air Medal (19); Army Commendation Medal
- Spouse: Sylvia

James Kenneth Johnson (May 30, 1916 – August 22, 1997) was a colonel in the United States Air Force. In the Korean War he was a double ace, credited with shooting down ten enemy aircraft. He also had one "kill" in World War II, when he was a lieutenant colonel. He received numerous awards, including the Distinguished Service Cross, the Silver Star, the Legion of Merit, and the Distinguished Flying Cross.

== Early life and education ==
Johnson was born on May 30, 1916, in Phoenix, Arizona. In 1939, he graduated from the University of Arizona. On December 28 of that year, he entered the Army Air Corps' Aviation Cadet Program, training at Kelly and Randolph Fields. He was commissioned on August 30, 1940, when he also received his wings.

== Military career ==
From 1940 until October 1943, he was the Squadron Commander of the 43d Pursuit Squadron serving at Albrook Field in the Panama Canal Zone, where he helped protect the Panama Canal with his P-40 Warhawk. Also, he was Deputy Commander of the 404th Fighter-Bomber Group from November 1943 to October 1944. In March 1944, he went with the 404th to southern England to prepare for the Normandy landings, flying a P-47 Thunderbolt. From October 1944 until after the end of the war, in June 1945, he commanded the 48th Fighter-Bomber Group in Belgium. He flew 92 missions in the Thunderbolt, during which he was credited with one kill: a Fw 190.

After World War II, Johnson served at Ellington Field in Texas, where he was Base Commander, Instructor Pilot, project officer, and Commander of the 3605th Navigation Training Group. From September 1951 to October 1952, he was also Commander of the 3595th Flying Training Group at Nellis Air Force Base in Nevada.

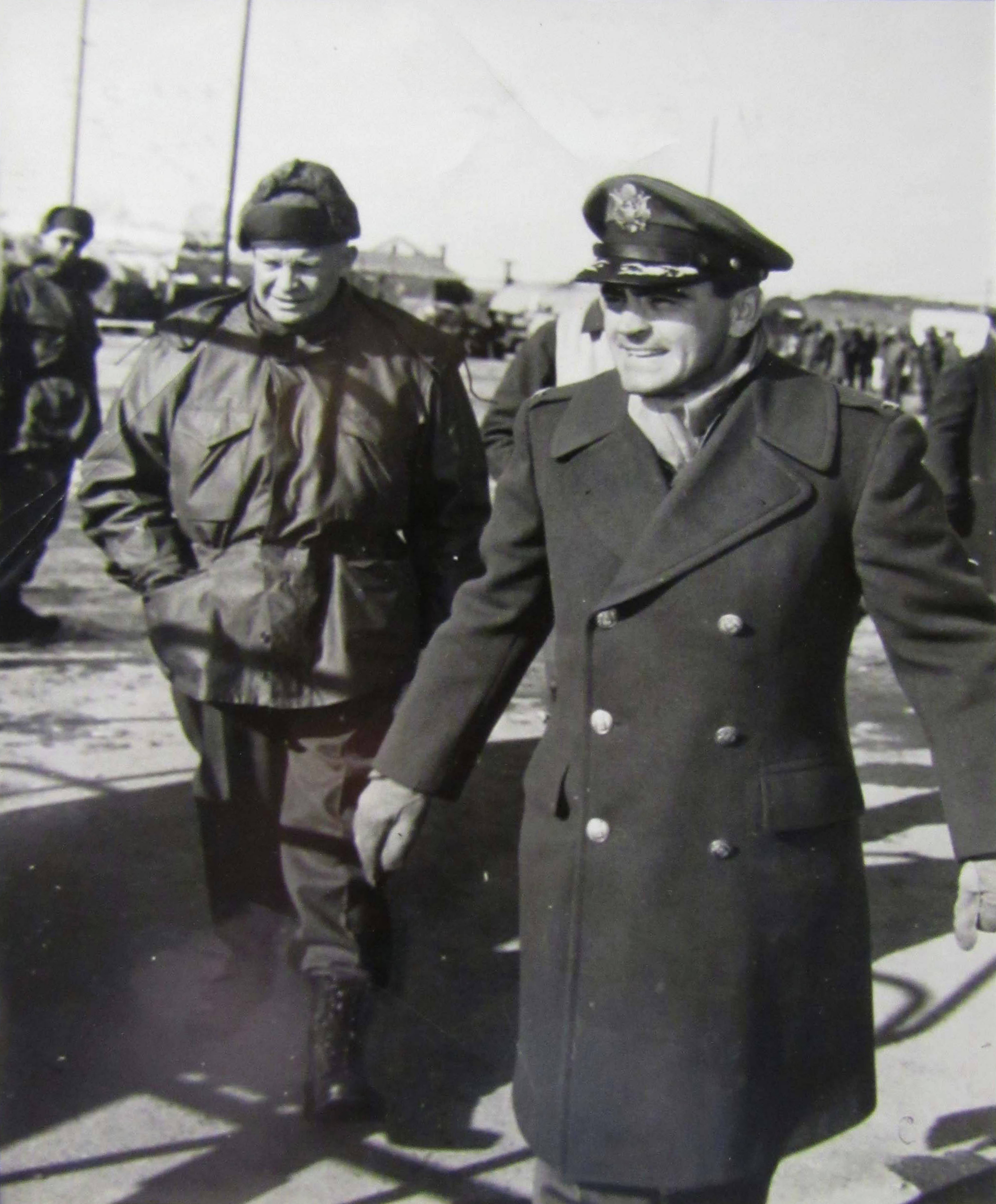
Johnson (right) with President-elect Dwight D. Eisenhower at Kimpo Air Base in 1952

During the Korean War, Johnson commanded the 4th Fighter Interceptor Wing from November 1952 to August 1953, flying combat in an F-86 Sabre; it was from that plane that he received his nickname, "The Mayor of Sabre Jet City". On March 28, 1953, he became the war's 29th jet ace when he shot down his fifth MiG-15. After 86 missions and eight months of combat, he had destroyed ten enemy aircraft, damaged nine more, and had three probables, making him the first double jet ace wing commander.

From when the war ended in 1953 until September 1956, Johnson worked at the Air Force headquarters in the Pentagon, where he was chief of the Air Defence Group in Research and Development. He then commanded the 55th Strategic Reconnaissance Wing at Forbes Air Force Base in Kansas from September 1956 to August 1959. After that, he went to Carswell Air Force Base, where he commanded two groups: the 3958th Operational Test and Evaluation Group from August 1959 to March 1960; and the 43rd Bomb Wing from then until June 1961. He was then posted to the 19th Air Division, with whom he was Director of Operations, from June to September 1961. The 43rd, the first supersonic bomb wing helped test the new, supersonic B-58 Hustler, developed by the Air Research and Development Command, Strategic Air Command, and Convair. With the B-58, the 43rd Wing broke eleven records for aircraft performance. In September 1961, he served at Headquarters Tactical Air Command at Langley Air Force Base, Virginia. He retired from the Air Force on November 30, 1963.

== Later life and death ==
James Johnson had four daughters (Jaye, Margaret, Patricia and Judith) with his first wife Mary Ellen and two children (Sherri and James Jr.) with his second wife Lorraine. He has several grandchildren including Jennifer Rachel Hecker, and great-grandchildren including Forest Shannon Hecker and Reed Bennett Hecker. In 1979, Johnson was remarried to his wife Sylvia, with Arizona Senator Barry Goldwater as his best man.

He died on August 22, 1997, and was buried at Arlington National Cemetery.

== Awards and legacy ==
On November 12, 1953, Johnson was awarded the Distinguished Service Cross and the Silver Star for actions on June 30 and May 17, 1953, respectively. He also received two awards of the Legion of Merit and three of the Distinguished Flying Cross. His third Distinguished Flying Cross was later rescinded because it was based on the same combat mission as his Distinguished Service Cross.

Command pilot badge
Distinguished Service Cross
Silver Star
Legion of Merit with bronze oak leaf cluster
Distinguished Flying Cross with bronze oak leaf cluster
Air Medal with three silver and bronze oak leaf clusters
Air Medal with bronze oak leaf cluster (second ribbon required for accouterment spacing)
Army Commendation Medal
Air Force Presidential Unit Citation with three bronze oak leaf clusters
Air Force Outstanding Unit Award with bronze oak leaf cluster
American Defense Service Medal with one service star
American Campaign Medal with one service star
European-African-Middle Eastern Campaign Medal with silver and bronze campaign stars
World War II Victory Medal
Army of Occupation Medal
National Defense Service Medal with one service star
Korean Service Medal with silver campaign stars
Air Force Longevity Service Award with silver oak leaf cluster
French Croix de Guerre with Palm
Republic of Korea Presidential Unit Citation
United Nations Service Medal for Korea
Korean War Service Medal

=== Distinguished Service Cross citation ===

Johnson, James K.
Colonel, U.S. Air Force
335th Fighter-Interceptor Squadron, 4th Fighter-Interceptor Group, 5th Air Force
Date of Action: June 30, 1953

Citation:

The President of the United States of America, authorized by Act of Congress July 9, 1918, takes pleasure in presenting the Distinguished Service Cross (Air Force) to Colonel James Kenneth Johnson, United States Air Force, for extraordinary heroism in connection with military operations against an armed enemy of the United Nations while serving as Pilot of an F-86 Sabrejet Fighter of the 335th Fighter-Interceptor Squadron, 4th Fighter-Interceptor Group, Fifth Air Force, in action against enemy forces in the Republic of Korea on 30 June 1953. Colonel Johnson was leading a flight of four F-86 aircraft deep within enemy territory when a flight of twelve enemy MiG aircraft was sighted at an altitude of thirty-five thousand feet. Colonel Johnson immediately initiated a forceful attack and concentrated on destroying one of the enemy aircraft. Closing on the single MiG, Colonel Johnson held his fire until he was within twelve hundred feet, at which time he scored numerous hits on the wing and fuselage of the enemy aircraft. To assure that he did not lose his tactical advantage, and with full knowledge of the potential danger from the other MiGs in the enemy flight, Colonel Johnson continued on his attack. With unswerving singleness of purpose, Colonel Johnson began firing from a range of six hundred feet, continuing his devastating barrage until he was only fifty feet from the enemy aircraft, at which time it began to burn and disintegrate. Only then did Colonel Johnson turn to face the fire of the other MiGs. While expertly maneuvering to escape the attacking enemy aircraft, Colonel Johnson experienced a loss of engine power which later proved to be the result of damage caused by debris from the destroyed enemy aircraft. In spite of the handicap of a disabled aircraft, he valiantly turned to attack the enemy MiGs, and by superb airmanship and aggressiveness, outmaneuvered them until they withdrew from the area. Colonel Johnson then brought his disabled aircraft back to base. The extraordinary heroism displayed by Colonel Johnson on this occasion reflects the greatest credit on himself and is in keeping with the high traditions of the military service.

While he commanded the 43rd Bomb Wing, he became the first and only wing commander to win the Blériot, MacKay, Thompson, and Harmon trophies.

The Johnson Dining Facility at Kadena Air Base is named for Johnson.

== See also ==
- List of Korean War flying aces
