= Robert T. Latshaw =

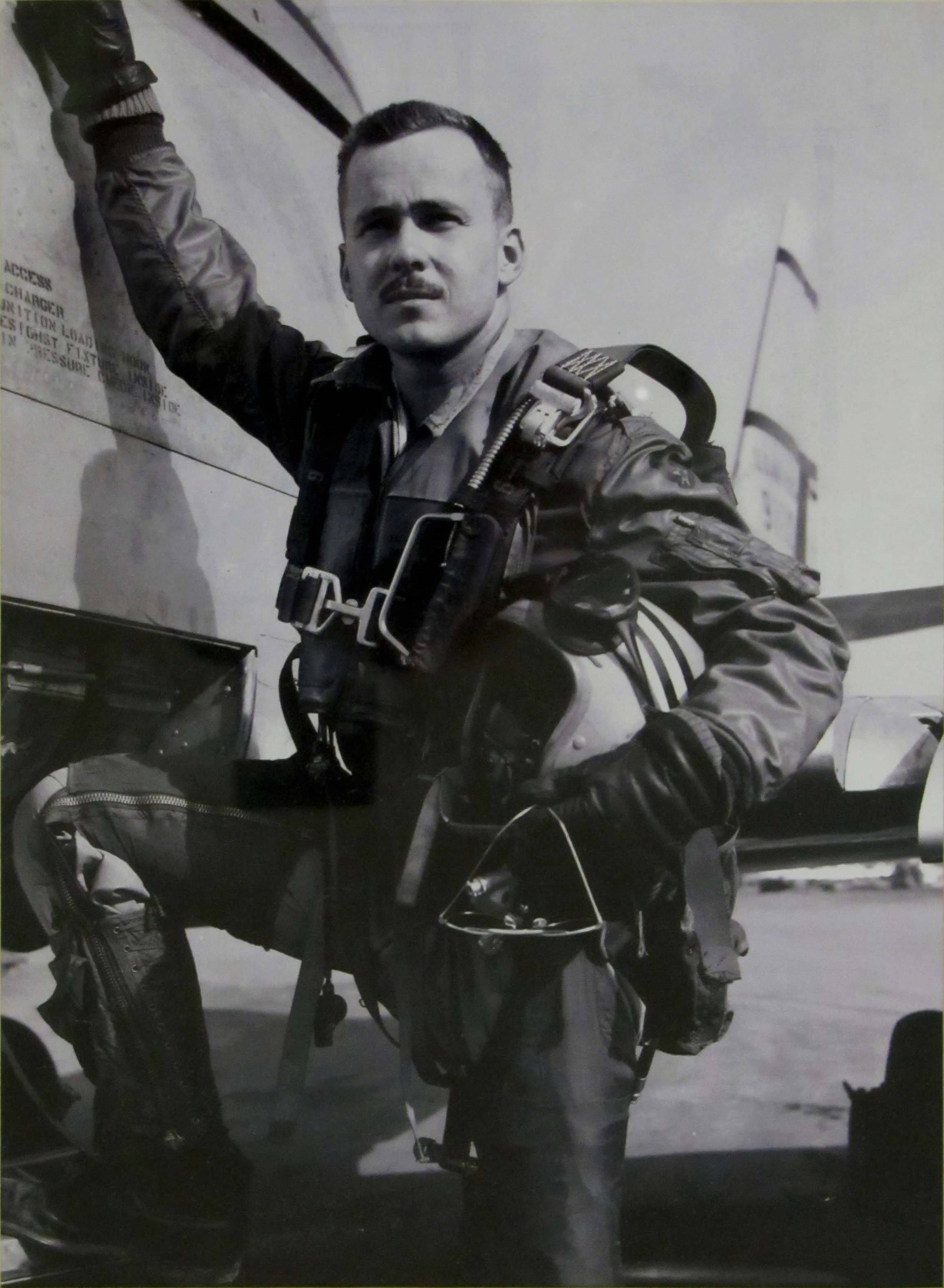
- Latshaw with his F-86 Sabre in Korea
- Born: August 20, 1925; St. Louis, Missouri
- Died: April 20, 1956 (aged 30) near Boca del Rio Air Base, Venezuela
- Burial place: San Francisco National Cemetery
- Military career
- Allegiance: United States
- Branch: United States Army Air Forces; United States Air Force
- Service years: 1943–1956
- Rank: Major
- Conflicts: Korean War
- Awards: Distinguished Flying Cross (3); Air Medal (6)

Robert Thomas Latshaw Jr. (August 20, 1925 – April 20, 1956) was a United States Air Force flying ace of the Korean War, credited with shooting down five enemy aircraft.

== Early life ==
Latshaw was born on August 20, 1925, in St. Louis.

== Military career ==
He enlisted in the U.S. Army Air Forces on July 7, 1943, and on May 23, he was accepted into the Aviation Cadet Program. On January 27, 1945, he was commissioned a second lieutenant and awarded his pilot wings at Boca Raton Army Air Field in Florida. World War II ended before Latshaw could participate in combat missions and he left active duty on December 7, 1946. He returned to active duty in the newly created U.S. Air Force on October 10, 1947. He was promoted to rank of captain on January 16, 1951.

=== Korean war ===
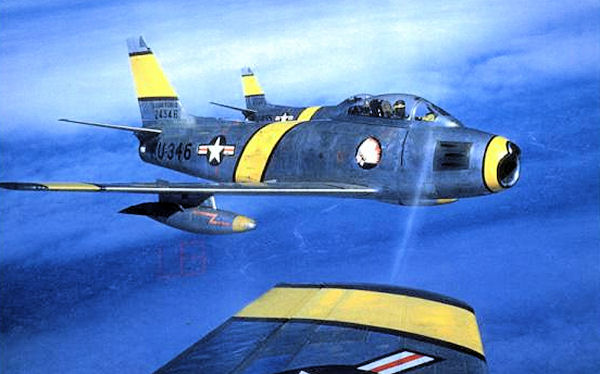
North American F-86F Sabres of the 335th FIS "Chiefs" over Korea

In the late 1951, he was assigned to 335th Fighter Interceptor Squadron of the 4th Fighter Interceptor Wing at Kimpo Air Base in South Korea, during the Korean War. Flying the North American F-86A Sabre, Latshaw shot down his first MiG-15 on January 25, 1952, near Pyongyang. On the same year, the 4th FIW received the F-86E Sabre and Latshaw shot down his second MiG-15 over North Hamgyong on March 19. On April of the same year, he shot down two more MiG-15s.

On May 3, 1952, Latshaw became the 13th American flying ace of the war, when he shot down his fifth MiG-15 over Yangsi, North Pyongan. He was also credited with damaging four MiG-15s during the war.

=== Post war ===
After the war, Latshaw continued to serve in the U.S. Air Force. On April 20, 1956. he was killed in the crash of a Lockheed T-33 Shooting Star near Boca del Rio Air Base in Venezuela. He was buried at the San Francisco National Cemetery.

== Awards and decorations ==

U.S. Air Force Senior Pilot Badge
Distinguished Flying Cross with 2 bronze oak leaf clusters	Air Medal with silver oak leaf cluster	Air Force Presidential Unit Citation
Army Good Conduct Medal	American Campaign Medal	World War II Victory Medal
National Defense Service Medal	Korean Service Medal with three bronze campaign stars	Air Force Longevity Service Award with bronze oak leaf cluster
Republic of Korea Presidential Unit Citation	United Nations Service Medal for Korea	Korean War Service Medal

== See also ==
- List of Korean War flying aces
