= Richard S. Becker =

United States Air Force flying ace (1926–2015)

- Born: December 4, 1926; Fleetwood, Pennsylvania, U.S.
- Died: January 5, 2015 (aged 88)
- Military career
- Allegiance: United States
- Branch: United States Army Air Forces; United States Air Force
- Rank: Major
- Conflicts: World War II; Korean War
- Awards: Silver Star; Distinguished Flying Cross (2)

Richard S. Becker (December 4, 1926 – January 5, 2015) was a United States Air Force flying ace during the Korean War, shooting down five enemy aircraft in the war.

== See also ==
- List of Korean War flying aces
