= Boris Siskov =

Soviet air force fighter pilot

Boris Nikolayevich Siskov
- Борис Николаевич Сиськов
- Born: 30 July 1920; Smirnovka village, Yeniseysk Governorate, RSFSR (located in present-day Minusinsky District)
- Died: 25 February 1984 (aged 63); Kislovodsk, USSR
- Military career
- Allegiance: Soviet Union
- Branch: Soviet Air Force
- Service years: 1940–1958
- Rank: Major
- Conflicts: World War II; Korean War
- Awards: Medal "For Courage"

Boris Nikolayevich Siskov (Russian: Борис Николаевич Сиськов; 20 July 1920 – 25 February 1984) was a Soviet MiG-15 flying ace during the Korean War credited with eleven or five aerial victories. He was the final Soviet ace of the war, scoring his fifth (and possibly last) victory on 20 July 1953.

== Awards ==
- Order of Lenin (4 June 1954)
- Medal "For Courage" (31 August 1945)
- Medal "For Battle Merit" (15 November 1950)

== See also ==
- List of Korean War flying aces
