= Dmitry Oskin =

Soviet pilot

Dmitry Pavlovich Oskin
- Дмитрий Павлович Оськин
- Born: 25 October 1919; Stavropol, Stavropol Krai, Russian SFSR, Soviet Union
- Died: 25 January 2004 (aged 84); Moscow, Russian Federation
- Military career
- Allegiance: Soviet Union
- Branch: Soviet Air Force
- Service years: 1938 – 1987
- Rank: General-lieutenant
- Commands: 523rd Fighter Aviation Regiment
- Conflicts: World War II; Korean War
- Awards: Hero of the Soviet Union

Dmitry Pavlovich Oskin (Russian: Дмитрий Павлович Оськин; 25 October 1919 – 25 January 2004) was a Soviet MiG-15 pilot and flying ace during the Korean War credited with 11 to 19 solo victories.

== Early life ==
Oskin was born on 25 October 1919 to a working-class Russian family in Stravpol. After completing his tenth grade of school in 1937 he trained at an aeroclub and worked for a newspaper in Tbilisi before entering the military in November 1938. After graduating from the Stalingrad Military Aviation School in 1940 he was assigned to the 51st Fighter Aviation Regiment.

== Military career ==
=== World War II ===
For most of the war Oskin was not directly on the warfront, instead working as a flight instructor and later flying with several units that were not deployed before he was sent to the front in October 1944 as part of the 863rd Fighter Aviation Regiment. From then until the end of the war he flew 66 missions and engaged in two dogfights while flying the La-5 and La-7, but he did not shoot down any enemy aircraft. However, he did destroy ten ground vehicles.

=== Interwar period ===
In November 1945 Oskin became assistant commander of the air rifle service of the 863rd Fighter Regiment, and in April 1947 he became chief of that within the 9th Guards Fighter Aviation Regiment. In 1949 he transferred to the 18th Guards Fighter Aviation Regiment, which was based in the Belorussian Military District until it was sent to Northern China in 1951.

=== Korean War ===
Shortly after his regiment was sent to Northern China in May 1951, Oskin became commander of the 523rd Fighter Aviation Regiment in October, which used the MiG-15. Before the promotion he scored several aerial victories, and by the time he was awarded the title Hero of the Soviet Union on 13 November 1951 he gained eleven solo shootdowns, plus one shared. Due to combat taking a toll on his health he flew less in 1952, so his deputy Grigory Okhay often took his place in flights. By the time he was recalled from Korea he had flown 150 sorties, engaged in 60 dogfights, and accumulated at least 11 solo kills, which included the F-86, Meteors, B-29, F-84s, and F-80; most sources indicate a solo score around 15. The number of aircraft shot down by his regiment significantly exceeded the losses; for only 16 aircraft lost and 6 pilots killed, the unit shot down 105 aircraft.

=== Postwar ===
Once he returned to the Soviet Union he continued to serve in the Air Force, and after graduating from the Air Force Academy in Monino in 1956 he became the deputy commander of the 1st Guards Fighter Training Division; he became commander of it in 1957, but returned to his studies in 1959. After graduating from the Military Academy of General Staff in 1961 he became the deputy commander of the 61st Guards Fighter Corps. He rose through the ranks and went on to hold a variety of high command positions, becoming the deputy inspector-general of the air force before he retired in 1987. After retiring from the military he lived in Moscow, where he died on 25 January 2004 and was buried in the Nikolo-Archangelskoe Cemetery.

== Awards and honors ==
USSR and Russia

- Hero of the Soviet Union (13 November 1951)
- Honored Military Pilot of the USSR (18 August 1972)
- Two Order of Lenin (13 November 1951 and 31 October 1967)
- Order of the October Revolution (27 December 1982)
- Order of Alexander Nevsky (31 May 1945)
- Order of the Patriotic War 1st class (11 March 1985)
- Order of the Patriotic War 2nd class (28 February 1945)
- Two Order of the Red Star (10 October 1951 and 30 April 1954)
- Order "For Service to the Homeland in the Armed Forces of the USSR" 3rd class (17 February 1976)
- Medal "For Battle Merit" (20 June 1949)
- Medal of Zhukov
- Medal "For the Capture of Königsberg" (1945)
- Medal "For the Victory over Germany in the Great Patriotic War 1941–1945" (1945)
- jubilee medals

Foreign

- Medal of Sino-Soviet Friendship (China)
- Medal “For Strengthening Friendship in Arms”, Golden class (Czechoslovakia)
- Medal Brotherhood in Arms, Bronze class (East Germany)
- Order of the Polar Star (Mongolia)

== See also ==
- List of Korean War flying aces
