= Fyodor Shebanov =

Soviet Korean War flying ace (1921–1951)

Fyodor Akimovich Shebanov
- Фёдор Акимович Шебанов
- Born: 26 May 1921; Studenki village, Ranenburgsky district, Ryazan Governorate, Russian SFSR
- Died: 26 October 1951 (aged 30); Pyongyang, Korean Peninsula
- Military career
- Allegiance: Soviet Union
- Branch: Soviet Air Force
- Service years: 1940 – 1951
- Rank: Senior lieutenant (posthumously)
- Units: 730th Fighter Aviation Regiment; 196th Fighter Aviation Regiment
- Conflicts: World War II; Korean War
- Awards: Hero of the Soviet Union

Fyodor Akimovich Shebanov (Russian: Фёдор Акимович Шебанов; 26 May 1921 – 26 October 1951) was a Soviet MiG-15 pilot who became a flying ace during the Korean War, with around 6 victories. He was killed in action 26 October 1951.

== Early life ==
Shebanov was born into a peasant family in Ryazan Governorate, on 26 May 1921. He graduated from eight classes of secondary school, before being transferred to Ryazan Musical College in 1940, where he attended first year of the institution.

== Military career ==
In October 1940, he was drafted into the Red Army and later was transferred to the Soviet Air Force. From October 1940 to April 1942, he served as radio telegraph operator of the airfield service battalion in the Air Force of the Central Asian Military District at Stalinabad, Tajik SSR.

Shebanov graduated from the Odessa Military Aviation School of Pilots in 1944, which operated in the city of Frunze, Kirghiz SSR, after its evacuation to Soviet Central Asia following the outbreak of Operation Barbarossa in June 1941. He was promoted to Junior lieutenant on 27 December 1944. In January 1945, he was assigned to the 730th Fighter Aviation Regiment of 125th Fighter Aviation Division of the Western Air Defense Front, during World War II. Flying Yak-9s, he flew combat and patrol missions over the Baltic ports. He did not encounter any enemy aircraft nor engage in air combat.

After the end of World War II, he continued to serve in the Air Force. Shebanov was promoted to Lieutenant on 25 August 1947. In December 1948, he was transferred to the 32nd Guards Fighter Aviation Regiment of the 15th Guards Fighter Aviation Division of 64th Air Fighter Air Defense Army. In February 1950, the regiment was transferred to the 324th Fighter Aviation Division of the Moscow Air Defense District.

Following the outbreak of Korean War in July 1950, Shebanov was assigned to the 196th Fighter Aviation Regiment. In December 1950, Shebanov left for North China to join the regiment. For about three months, the regiment was engaged in preparing for hostilities and training Chinese pilots on flying the Mikoyan-Gurevich MiG-15. In April 1951, the regiment began flying combat missions. Shebanov flew his first combat mission in MiG-15, on 4 April and on the same mission he scored his first aerial victory, when he shot down a USAF F-86 Sabre.

In less than two months of battles, he flew 69 missions, which includes 29 dogfights against American fighter jets, while flying MiG-15s. He scored his last aerial victory on 20 May 1951, when he shot down an F-86. Shebanov was credited with 6 USAF aircraft shot down, which includes one B-29 Superfortress and five F-86 Sabres.

On 10 October 1951, Senior Lieutenant Shebanov was awarded the title of Hero of the Soviet Union, but he was killed in action before he could receive the medal.

== Final mission and death ==
According to Yevgeny Pepelyaev, the second highest scoring Soviet flying ace in the Korean War, Shebanov often disregarded his flight leader and frequently broke away from the group during aerial combat, which ultimately led to his death in his final mission.

On 26 October 1951, during a dogfight, Shebanov broke away from his flight group. He was then attacked by three USAF F-84 Thunderjets. As a result, he was shot down and his plane crashed 35 kilometers south-west of Pyongyang, resulting in his death. He was posthumously promoted to Senior lieutenant.

Shebanov was buried at the Lushun Soviet Army Martyrs Cemetery in Dalian, China.

== Awards ==
- Hero of the Soviet Union (10 October 1951)
- Order of Lenin (10 October 1951)
- Order of the Red Banner (2 June 1951)
- Medal "For Battle Merit" (15 November 1950)

== See also ==
- List of Korean War flying aces
