= Dmitry Samoylov (pilot) =

Soviet fighter pilot during World War Two & Korean War

Dmitry Aleksandrovich Samoilov
- Дмитрий Александрович Самойлов
- Born: 31 December 1922; Kokand, Turkestan ASSR, RSFSR
- Died: 15 August 2012 (aged 89); Elektrostal, Moscow oblast, Russian Federation
- Military career
- Allegiance: Soviet Union
- Branch: Soviet Air Force
- Service years: 1940 – 1960
- Rank: Colonel
- Conflicts: World War II; Korean War
- Awards: Hero of the Soviet Union

Dmitry Aleksandrovich Samoilov (Russian: Дмитрий Александрович Самойлов; 31 December 1922 – 15 August 2012) was a Soviet fighter pilot who flew in World War II and later Korea, during which he became credited as a flying ace and was awarded the title Hero of the Soviet Union.

== Early life ==
Samoilov was born on 31 December 1922 to a working-class Russian family in Kokand, located in present-day Uzbekistan. In 1940 he completed his 9th grade of school in Elektrostal, and later that year he graduated from the Noginsk aeroclub. After joining the military he trained at the Kachin Military Aviation School of Pilots, graduating in September 1941. He then graduated from the Konotop Military Aviation School of Pilots in February 1945, becoming a flight instructor there afterwards. In 1946 he was transferred to the 171st Fighter Aviation Regiment, and in 1948 to the 139th Regiment, before being sent to the 523rd Fighter Regiment in July 1950 as a senior pilot. That summer the unit was sent to the Russian Far East with other parts of the 303rd Fighter Division, and in March 1951 they were sent to Manchuria, China where they underwent intense training before first entering combat in Korea on 1 June 1951.

== Korean War ==
As one of the few pilots in his regiment who had not flown in combat before, Samoylov initially flew with his more experienced counterparts, including Aleksandr Karasyov and Grigory Okhay. Due to his inexperience he became separated from his squadron commander during a flight, but managed to survive the incident, with much guilt over having endangered himself and his commander. It was not until 9 September 1951 that he was credited with an aerial victory after he badly damaged the F-86 of Donald Jabush, although Jabush was able to land his damaged plane. His next credited aerial victory took place the next day after he damaged another F-86, and during a later mission that day he was credited with shooting down an F-84. His next credited aerial victories were attacks on F-86 fighters in October. Later that month he attacked a B-29, causing damage that led to it losing control and fatally crashing while on approach to landing. Another credited victory that day was the downing of an F-84, although some sources indicate the aircraft suffered a compressor failure as cause of its crash. The last time Samoylov was officially credited with an aerial victory was on 4 November 1951, an incident indicated to have involved an F-86. Postwar historians credit him with an additional aerial victory on 5 January 1952 during a flight with Grigory Okhay in which he encountered an F-84, but there are no documents from his regiment supported the claim. Shortly after being made a flight commander in January 1952, he was made deputy commander of the 2nd squadron the next month. However, he did not hold that position for very long, since his regiment made its last sortie taking place on 20 February 1952 before being sent back to the USSR. Throughout the conflict Samoylov flew 161 sorties and accumulated 128 hours and 54 minutes of flight time in combat.

== Postwar ==
After returning from Korea he remained in the Air Force, being promoted to squadron commander within his regiment in 1957. In March 1958 he became the deputy commander for flight training in the 224th Fighter Regiment before entering the reserve in July 1960. After graduating from an Engineering College in 1965 he worked as an engineer in Elektrostal until 1988. He lived there for the remainder of his life until he died on 15 August 2012.

== Awards ==
- Hero of the Soviet Union (13 November 1951)
- Order of Lenin (13 November 1951)
- Two Order of the Red Banner (10 October 1951 and 4 June 1955)
- Order of the Patriotic War 1st class (14 March 1985)
- Order of the Red Star (22 February 1955)
