= 256th Fighter Aviation Regiment =

- Active: 1950–1959
- Country: Soviet Union
- Branch: Soviet Air Forces
- Type: Aviation Regiment
- Part of: 190th Fighter Aviation Division
- Garrison/HQ: Kamen-Rybolov
- Engagements: Korean War

Commanders
- Notable commanders: Ivan Semenyuk

Aircraft flown
- MiG-15

The 256th Fighter Aviation Regiment (256th IAP) was a fighter aviation regiment of the Soviet Air Forces. It existed between 1950 and 1959 and fought in the Korean War.

== History ==
The 256th Fighter Aviation Regiment was activated on 31 December 1950 as part of the 54th Air Army's 190th Fighter Aviation Division (IAD) at Kamen-Rybolov. The regiment was initially equipped with Bell P-63 Kingcobra fighters, and replaced the 17th Fighter Aviation Regiment, which had been deployed to Korea. It included personnel from the 494th and the 821st Fighter Aviation Regiments, and new flight school graduates. In July 1951, it received Mikoyan-Gurevich MiG-15 jet fighters.

The regiment was led by World War II flying ace and Hero of the Soviet Union Ivan Semenyuk from January 1952. At the same time, the regiment left for China with the 190th IAD. It deployed to Miaogou near Antung in northeast China in February 1952 as part of Soviet participation in the Korean War, becoming part of the 64th Fighter Aviation Corps. At this point the pilots of the regiment were inexperienced on the MiG-15, and did not have more than 50 to 60 hours of flight in the MiGs.

256th IAP navigator and pilot Viktor Kalmanson and 523rd IAP ace Grigory Okhay at Miaogou airfield, February 1952

The 256th fought in combat from 12 February to 10 August. On 14 February, the regiment flew as the cover group for the 190th's first mission as a full division, although the Soviet aircraft did not encounter the enemy. On 17 February, 3rd Squadron pilot Senior Lieutenant A.M. Zvorykin downed an American F-86E Sabre fighter flown by Captain Chuck Owens of the 336th Fighter-Interceptor Squadron (FIS), the regiment's first aerial victory. In the same action, Senior Lieutenant G.D. Kotovshchikov's aircraft was downed, the regiment's first loss.

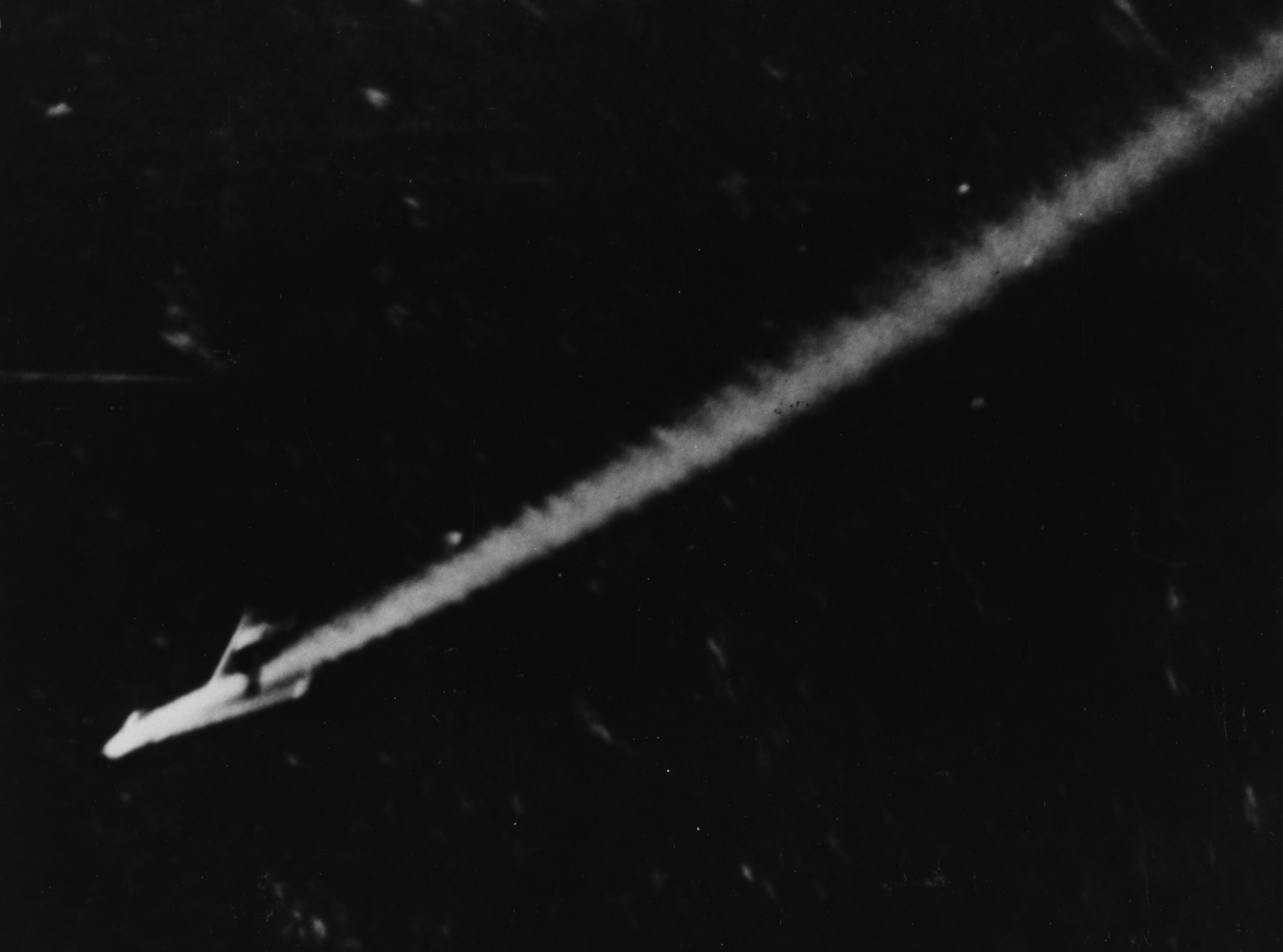
A MiG-15 being shot down by American aircraft in Korea, late 1952

On 3 March, the regiment shot down an F-86 Sabre with the loss of a MiG-15 over the Sui-ho Dam, during a day in which they flew three missions. Pilots of the regiment shot down two Sabres and suffered the loss of an MiG on 24 March while repulsing an American fighter-bomber raid. On 2 April, the regiment claimed two Sabres and on the next day lost two MiGs when they were jumped by Sabres while returning from a mission. The regiment lost four MiGs while downing a Sabre on 21 April. Three of the MiGs lost were shot down returning to Miaogou. The regiment shot down a Sabre on 3 May but lost three MiGs over Miaogou on the next day to planes from the 335th Fighter-Interceptor Squadron. On 20 May, regimental navigator Captain Viktor Kalmanson was shot down and killed by F-86s from the 335th FIS over Miaogou. The 256th suffered losses of three MiGs and one pilot while repelling fighter-bomber and carrier strikes against supply lines in the Anju area on 25 May. On the same day, it was relocated to Anshan airfield.

On 25 June, a flight of 256th IAP MiGs engaged four Sabres over Anshan without result. The regiment was transferred to the new Dapu airfield on 30 June as a result of heavy attacks on Anshan. On 4 July, while repulsing airstrikes against the power grid of the Sui-ho Dam, the regiment claimed an F-86, on a day that the 190th suffered heavy losses on. In July, flying ace Vladimir Zabelin became the acting regimental commander after Semenyuk fell ill and was evacuated. On 20 July Zabelin claimed an F-86 over Dapu airfield. On 6 August, the regiment had several dogfights with F-86s while sweeping the air over Antung airfield. The 256th IAP lost a MiG whose pilot bailed out on the next day, and on 9 August, the regiment suffered its final loss when Senior Lieutenant Khalitov was shot down, although he safely ejected. Six pilots of the regiment were killed during the deployment. According to Thomas Polak in his 1999 book on Soviet aces, the regiment shot down 16 Sabres while losing sixteen MiGs during the deployment. Mikhail Bykov provides a different figure in his 2014 book, with the 256th IAP claiming 18 F-86s while losing 20 MiGs.

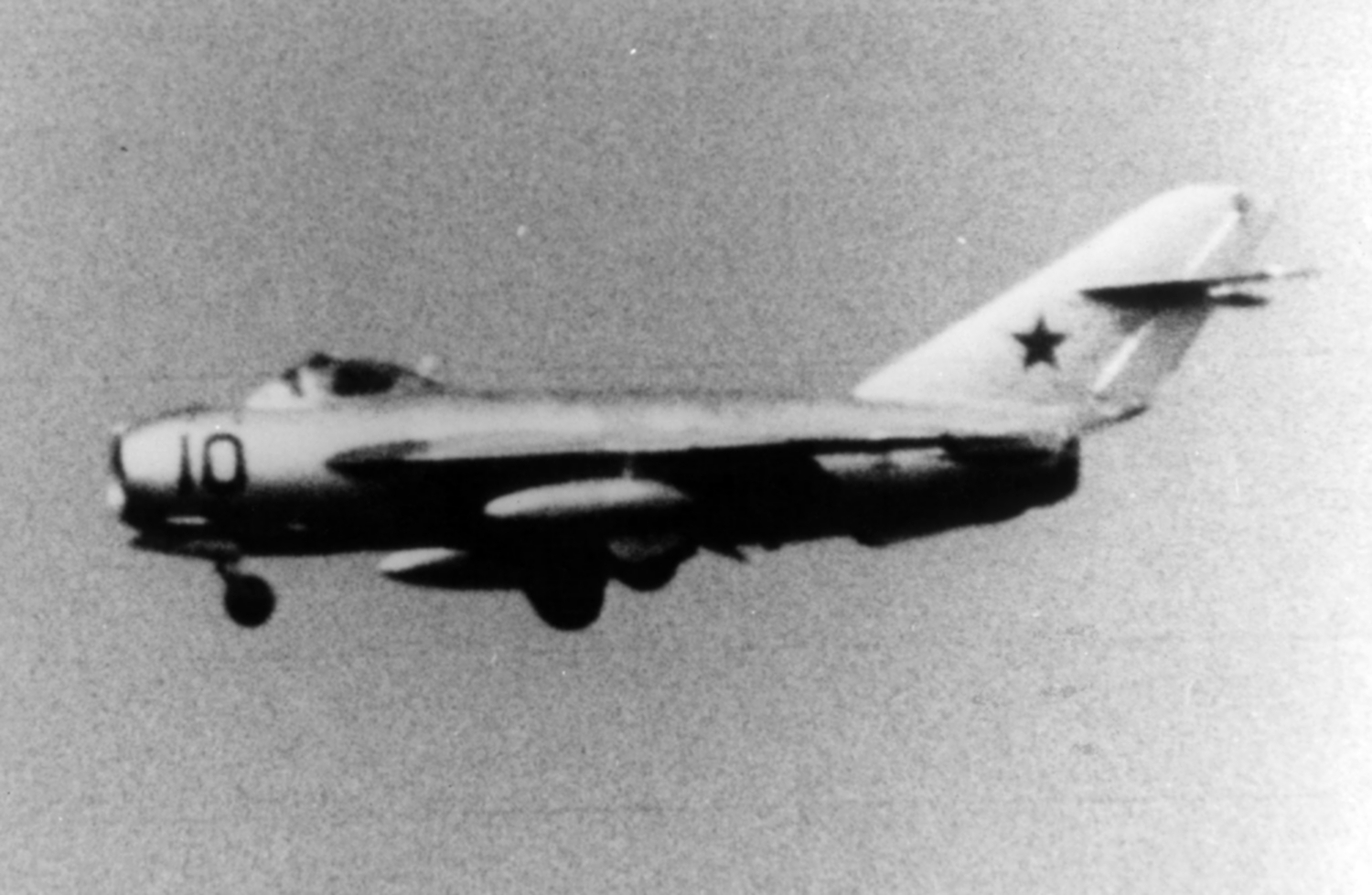
A MiG-17 of the type operated by the regiment after the Korean War

In August 1952 the 256th was moved back to Kamen-Rybolov when the 190th IAD rotated out of China. Zabelin became the regiment's permanent commander in November. The regiment received Mikoyan-Gurevich MiG-17 aircraft in 1954. The regiment was disbanded on 13 June 1959.

== Aircraft operated ==
Aircraft operated by 256th IAP, data from
From	To	Aircraft	Version
December 1950	1951	Bell P-63 Kingcobra	
July 1951	1954	Mikoyan-Gurevich MiG-15	
1954	1959	Mikoyan-Gurevich MiG-17	
