= William Wescott =

American Korean War flying ace

William Westcott
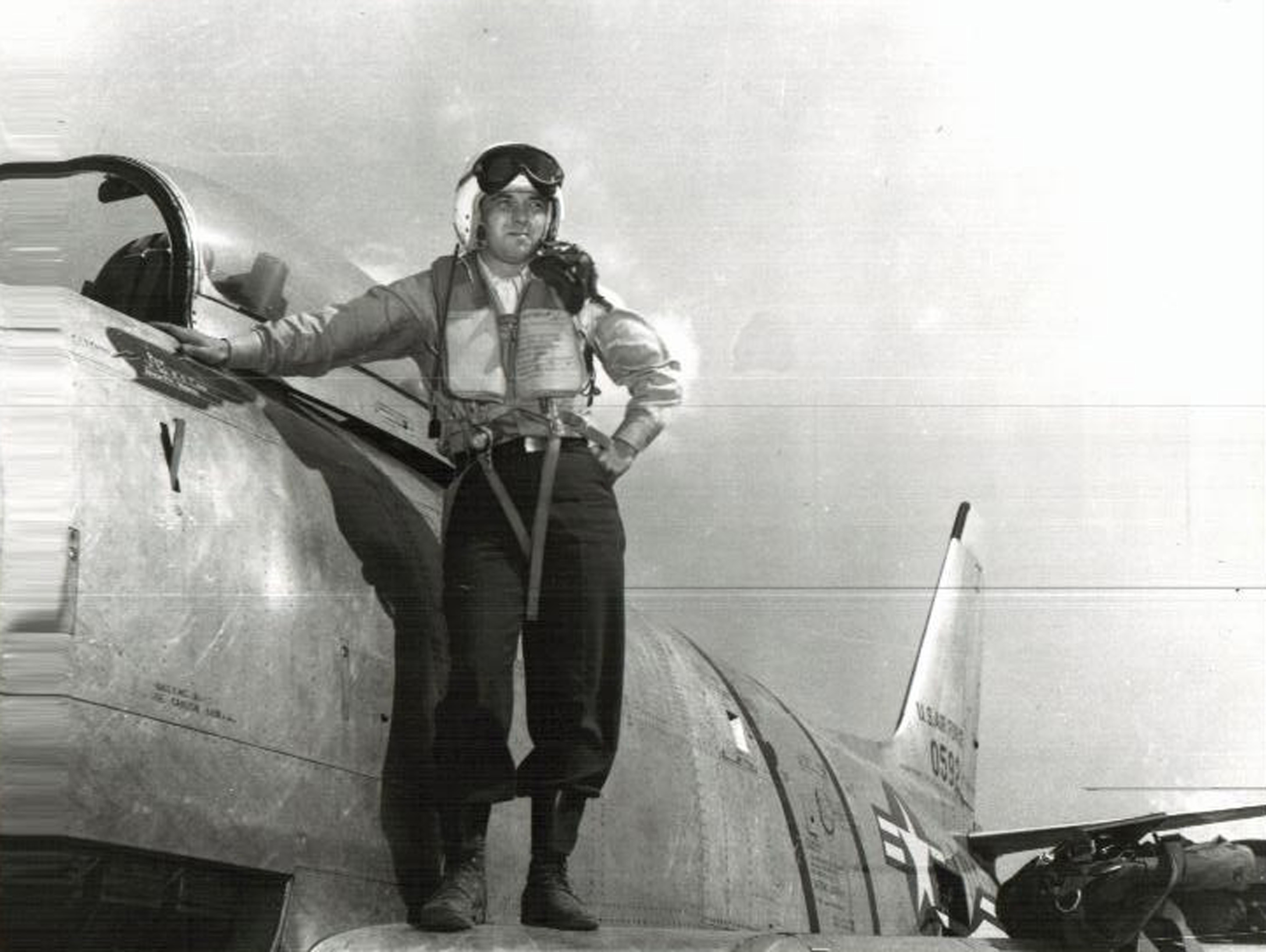
- Major William Wescott in Korea, 1950
- Born: September 1, 1922; Milwaukee, Wisconsin
- Died: February 25, 2016 (aged 93); Mesa, Arizona
- Military career
- Allegiance: United States
- Branch: United States Army Air Forces; United States Air Force
- Service years: 1942–1955
- Rank: Lieutenant colonel
- Conflicts: World War II; Korean War
- Awards: Silver Star; Distinguished Flying Cross (2)

William Henry Wescott (September 1, 1922 – February 25, 2016) was a United States Air Force flying ace of the Korean War, credited with shooting down five enemy aircraft.

== See also ==
- List of Korean War flying aces
