= Clyde A. Curtin =

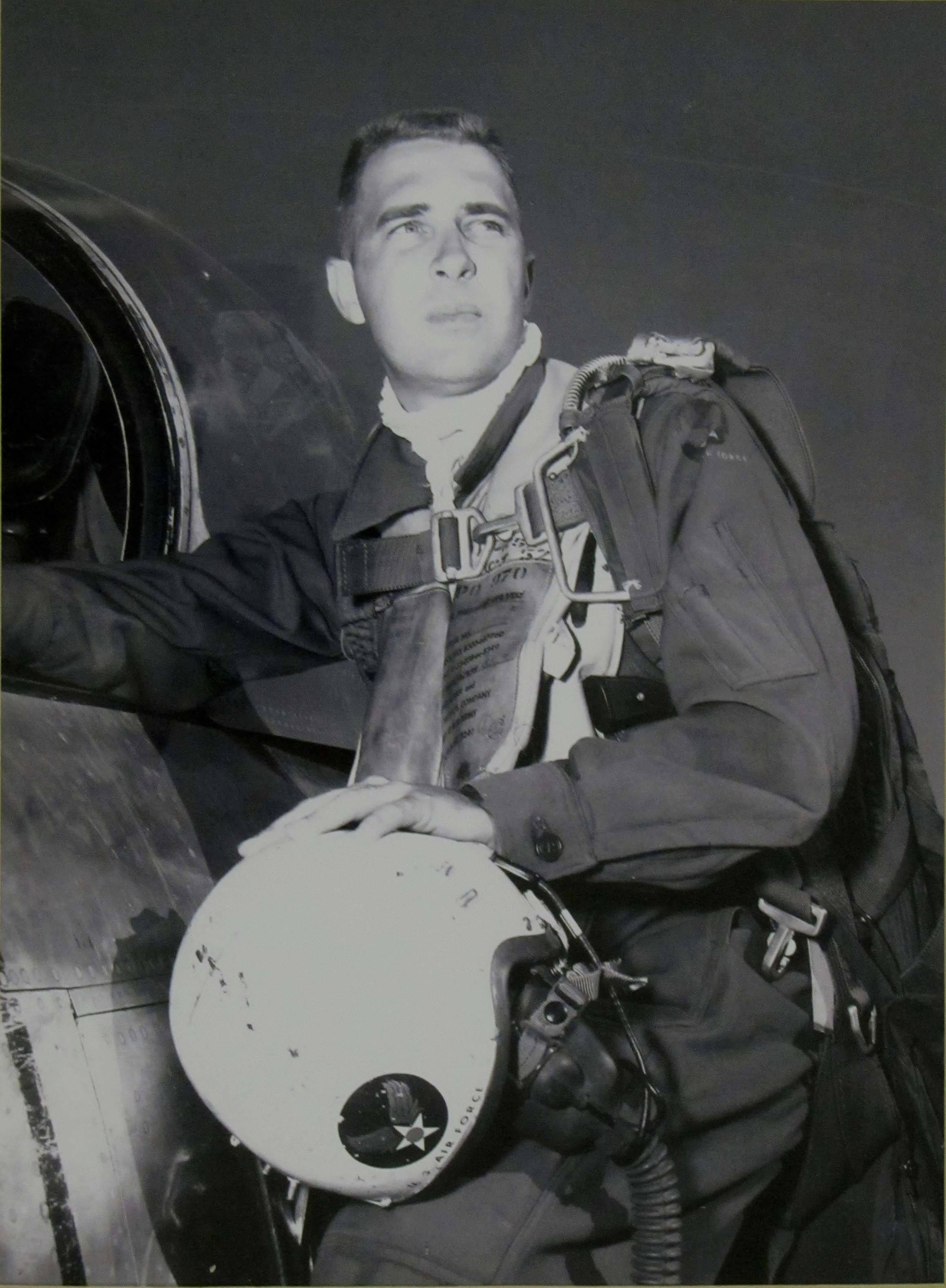
- Curtin with his F-86 Sabre in Korea
- Born: October 25, 1920; Gresham, Oregon, U.S.
- Died: August 22, 2011 (aged 90); Portland, Oregon, U.S.
- Military career
- Allegiance: United States
- Branch: United States Army Air Forces; United States Air Force
- Rank: Major
- Conflicts: World War II; Korean War
- Awards: Silver Star; Distinguished Flying Cross (3)

Clyde A. Curtin (October 25, 1920 – August 22, 2011) was a United States Air Force flying ace during the Korean War, shooting down five enemy aircraft in the war.

== See also ==
- List of Korean War flying aces
