= Serafim Subbotin =

Serafim Pavlovich Subbotin
- Серафим Павлович Субботин
- Born: 15 January 1921; Krasnogorye village, Yaroslavl Governorate, RSFSR
- Died: 22 April 1996 (aged 75); Cherkasy, Ukraine
- Military career
- Allegiance: Soviet Union
- Branch: Soviet Air Force
- Service years: 1938 – 1973
- Rank: Colonel
- Unit: 176th Guards Fighter Aviation Regiment
- Conflicts: Korean War
- Awards: Hero of the Soviet Union

Serafim Pavlovich Subbotin (Russian: Серафим Павлович Субботин; 15 January 1921 – 22 April 1996) was a MiG-15 pilot of the Soviet Union. He was a flying ace during the Korean War, with around 9 victories. He was awarded Hero of the Soviet Union. Some sources claim he had up to 15 victories, though most sources indicate 9.

== See also ==
- List of Korean War flying aces
