= Robert H. Moore =

American flying ace

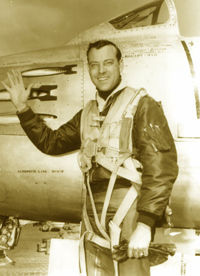
- Captain Robert H. Moore in 1950
- Born: May 13, 1924; Hillsboro, Texas, U.S.
- Died: January 1978
- Military career
- Allegiance: United States
- Branch: United States Army; United States Army Air Forces; United States Air Force
- Rank: Lieutenant colonel
- Conflicts: World War II; Korean War; Vietnam War
- Awards: Distinguished Flying Cross (3)

Robert Harold Moore (13 May 1924 – January 1978) was a United States Air Force flying ace of the Korean War, credited with shooting down five enemy aircraft in the war, all as a member of the 51st Fighter Interceptor Wing. Moore made his first kill on 28 October 1951 and fifth on 3 April 1952, all while flying the North American F-86 Sabre and all with the 16th Fighter Squadron except for one kill made with the 336th Fighter Squadron. He was the ninth American ace of the war.

== See also ==
- List of Korean War flying aces
