= Arkady Boytsov =

Soviet MiG-15 pilot

- Аркадий Сергеевич Бойцов
- Born: 17 March 1923; Podolsk, USSR
- Died: 15 June 2000 (aged 77); Samara, Russia
- Military career
- Allegiance: Soviet Union
- Branch: Soviet Air Force
- Service years: 1941 — 1976
- Rank: General-Major of Aviation
- Conflicts: World War II; Korean War
- Awards: Hero of the Soviet Union

Arkady Sergeyevich Boytsov (Russian: Аркадий Сергеевич Бойцов; 17 March 1923 - 15 June 2000) was a Soviet MiG-15 pilot and flying ace during the Korean War, credited with six to eleven victories. He was awarded Hero of the Soviet Union.

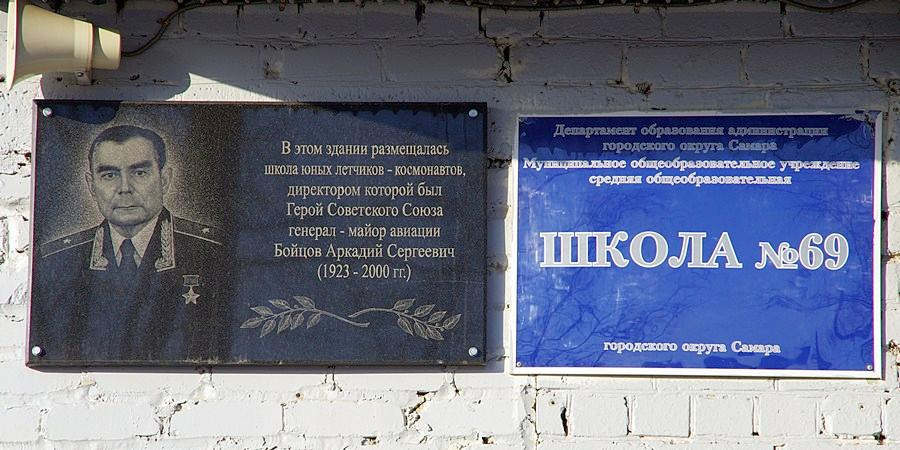
Memorial plaque on Municipal School №69 (Samara, Russia)

== Awards ==
- Hero of the Soviet Union (14 July 1953)
- Two Order of Lenin (25 September 1952 and 14 July 1953)
- Three Order of the Red Star (1 September 1944, 22 February 1955, and 30 December 1956)
- Order of the Patriotic War 1st class (11 March 1985)
- Medal "For Military Merit" (17 May 1951)

== See also ==
- List of Korean War flying aces
