= Alexander Smorchkov =

Soviet fighter pilot

Alexander Pavlovich Smorchkov
- Александр Павлович Сморчков
- Born: 29 November 1919; Chekmovo, Moscow Governorate, Russian SFSR
- Died: 16 November 1998 (aged 78); Moscow, Russian Federation
- Military career
- Allegiance: Soviet Union
- Branch: Soviet Air Force
- Service years: 1938 – 1975
- Rank: Colonel
- Units: 523rd Fighter Aviation Regiment; 18th Guards Fighter Aviation Regiment
- Conflicts: World War II; Korean War
- Awards: Hero of the Soviet Union

Alexander Pavlovich Smorchkov (Russian: Александр Павлович Сморчков; 29 November 1919 – 16 November 1998) was a Soviet fighter pilot. After gaining three shootdowns during World War II he went on to attain ace status in the Korean War, being credited with 12-13 solo victories on the MiG-15 for which he was awarded the title Hero of the Soviet Union.

== Early life and World War II ==
Smorchkov was born on 29 November 1919 to a Russian family in Chekmovo, Moscow. After completing his seventh grade of school in 1935 he worked and attended a trade school while training at an aeroclub. Having entered the military in 1938, he soon went on to graduate from the Kachin Military Aviation School of Pilots with the rank of junior lieutenant in 1940, after which he became a flight instructor at the Lviv Military Aviation School of Pilots. From December that year until August 1941 he worked training pilots at the Fastovsky Military School of Aviation. In October he arrived at the warfront, where he was wounded in combat that month after tallying 51 sorties and 9 aerial engagements. After recovering from his injuries in December that year he was assigned to work for the Chernogovskoye Military-Emergency Services Association, where he was soon promoted to flight commander. One year later he became a deputy squadron commander in the 761st Fighter Aviation Regiment, which was stationed away from the front. There he learned to pilot the Yak-7B before entering navigator courses. Upon redeployment in September 1943 he returned to combat, but during his first sortie he received minor injuries, resulting in him being sent back to study. Eventually he was able to return to the 523rd Fighter Aviation Regiment in May 1944, and by the end of the war he shot down two or three enemy aircraft – two Bf 109 and possibly an FW 190 throughout the course of over 200 missions. (Note: Bykov credits him with 213 sorties and two Bf 109 shootdowns in WWII, while Seidov credits him with 279 sorties and three shootdowns (two Bf 109s and an FW 190). Kenneth P. Werrell credits him with five unspecified victories,) He remained in the 523rd Regiment after the war.

== Korean War ==
Several months after the outbreak of the Korean War, Smorchkov was transferred to the 18th Guards Fighter Aviation Regiment, and two months later in March 1951 the until was sent to China. In May he entered combat, and from then until February 1952 he flew over 100 sorties, (Note: Bykov credits him with 191 sorties in the Korean war, while Seidov credits him with 150.) which resulted in him tallying 52 aerial engagements, one shared and 12 or 13 solo shootdowns. According to Smorchkov, he and his wingman Dmitry Oskin shot down five Gloster Meteors during a single night. During one of his last flights he was wounded in the leg, but survived. On 13 November 1951 he was awarded the title Hero of the Soviet Union for his first ten solo victories. The breakdown and exact number of his victories varies from source to source, but all indicate a tally of at least 12.

== Postwar ==
In August 1952 during the midst of hostilities in Korea he was recalled from combat and sent to attend the Air Force Academy in Monino. After graduating in 1956 he became commander of the 826th Fighter Training Aviation Regiment, and in 1960 took command of the 802nd Fighter Training Aviation Regiment. In 1962 he was promoted to deputy commander of the 9th Fighter Aviation Division, and in 1964 he was made commander of the 95th Fighter Aviation Division; later that year he was made head of the command post of the 26th Air Army. In 1966 he began working at the Zhukovsky Air Force Engineering Academy, where he was promoted to senior teacher in 1967. After entering the reserve in 1975 he remained in Moscow, where he died on 16 November 1998 and was buried in the Troyekurovskoye cemetery.

== Awards ==
- Hero of the Soviet Union (13 November 1951)
- Order of Lenin (13 November 1951)
- Three Order of the Red Banner (27 August 1944, 28 October 1944, and 28 March 1945)
- Order of Alexander Nevsky (26 December 1944)
- Two Order of the Patriotic War 1st class (1 July 1944 and 11 March 1985)
- Two Order of the Red Star (10 October 1951 and 5 November 1954)
- Medal "For Military Merit" (20 June 1949)

== See also ==
- List of Korean War flying aces
