= Mikhail Ponomaryov =

Mikhail Sergeyevich Ponomaryov
- Михаил Сергеевич Пономарёв
- Born: 15 December 1920; Alexeyevka, Kirghiz ASSR, RSFSR
- Died: 26 September 2006 (aged 85); Kherson, Ukraine
- Military career
- Allegiance: Soviet Union; Poland
- Branch: Soviet Air Force (1940-1944, 1947-1968); Polish Air Force (1944-1947)
- Service years: 1940 – 1968
- Rank: Colonel
- Conflicts: World War II; Korean War
- Awards: Hero of the Soviet Union

Mikhail Sergeyevich Ponomaryov (Russian: Михаил Сергеевич Пономарёв; 15 December 1920 – 26 September 2006) was a Soviet fighter pilot who flew with the Polish Air Force during World War II and later became a flying ace during the Korean war, with 10 to 14 victories.

== Early life ==
Ponomaryov was born on 15 December 1920 to a Russian peasant family in the village of Alexeyevka. After completing his ninth grade of school in 1937 he worked at a mine in Karaganda and trained at the local aeroclub, which he graduated from in 1939. He then entered the military in March 1940 and went on to graduate from a school for aviation specialists in November, after which he was assigned to the 136th High-speed Bomber Regiment as a radio operator and gunner. In January 1941 he became a cadet at the Stalingrad Military Aviation School of Pilots, where he graduated in 1942.

== World War II ==
After graduating from the school in Stalingrad he was assigned to the 897th Fighter Aviation Regiment, and in November he was reassigned to the 13th Reserve Fighter Regiment. However, the first time he saw combat in the war was in 1943 while he was in the infantry, since from March to September that year he was an assistant platoon commander in the 32nd Separate Rifle Brigade. Upon his return to aviation in September he was assigned to the 8th Separate Training Aviation Regiment, and in February 1944 he was sent back to the front as a pilot in the 832nd Fighter Regiment. There he gained his first aerial victory when he shot down a Fw 190 in July, and in August he gained his first (and only) shared victory.

In October the 832nd Regiment was transferred to the Polish Air Force, where it was renamed to the 11th Regiment but only entered combat in late April 1945. Ponomaryov's exact tally from the war is unclear, although there is consensus that he was not made an ace in the war.

== Interwar period ==
Remaining with the Polish Air Force until 1947, Ponomaryov had risen up from senior pilot to flight commander in the 11th Regiment by May 1945, and in May 1947 he was promoted to deputy squadron commander in the 3rd Fighter Regiment; however, he returned to the Soviet Union just two months later and was assigned to the 523rd Fighter Aviation Regiment. By 1948 he became a skilled pilot of the MiG-15, and was a participant in the 1950 May Day air parade that included a flyover of Red Square. In August that year the regiment was sent to Vozdvizhenka in the Russian Far East as part of a prelude to the Soviet participation in the Korean War.

== Korean War ==
Not long after arriving in China, the 523rd Regiment first saw combat with American jets on 18 June 1951 over the Chongju-Pakchon-Kusong area. That day he was credited with his first aerial victory in war, an F-86. During the 14-minute dogfight Karasyov and Yakovlev also claimed one F-86 each. However, American records do not indicate the loss of those Sabres. Throughout the entire day there had been multiple dogfights between MiGs and Sabres in the area, but Americans indicated the loss of only one – an F-86A piloted by William Crone, who was killed in action. The next time he was credited with a victory was on 24 June, involving an F-80. In that incident, he shot down F-80 No. 49-721; the plane crashed, killing the pilot, First Lieutenant Will C. White. That day his regiment claimed to have shot down eight other F-80.

On 26 June 1951 Ponomaryov was ordered to be transferred to the 17th Fighter Aviation Regiment as commander of the 2nd squadron; the squadron had only eight pilots in it when he took command of it on 17 July, and previously it had been plagued by high casualties since many members were inexperienced. Surviving veterans of the squadron later praised Ponomaryov for developing better combat tactics and bravery, saying that he met their expectations. As a new squadron commander, he first led his men into combat on 29 July. During their first dogfight he spotted a group of six American aircraft he presumed to be F-80s and led his squadron in engaging them. Ponomaryov was credited with downing one, and Soviet records claim that three others were downed in the battle, but American records confirmed only one aerial victory that day, and that it was an F-84 (No. 49-2339), not an F-80 shot down Grigory Fokin, who was injured during the battle. Several days later American records indicate multiple other F-84s were written off, including No.49-2385, which was indicated as having crashed before reaching its base. Many historians believe this was the aircraft shot down by Ponomaryov on 29 July.

The next month his squadron made 14 sorties and engaged in 5 dogfights, but only Ponomaryov claimed an aerial victory, doing so on 31 August. Earlier that month he mistook Nikolai Sutyagin’s plane for the enemy and fired at it, but did not hit it. Sutyagin was not hurt, and Ponomaryov admitted his mistake and never made another one like it. On 11 September he was credited with shooting down three F-84s over the course of two sorties, and went on to be credited with another victory on 19 September. On 1 October he shot down another F-84, but the next day was marked with tragedy for him after Captain Ivan Nikolaevich Morozov was shot down by an F-86 and killed. It was the first (and only) time a pilot was killed in the squadron under his command.

Previously a pilot had been shot down by Chinese anti-aircraft fire, but managed to eject safely. With the loss of Morozov and the departure of several other squadron members for health reasons, few people were left, so on 22 October more crews were added. They received a new squadron navigator, but he made only two sorties before being withdrawn from combat; during his second mission he was attacked by an F-86 and badly burned. In November Ponomaryov did not shoot down any more enemy aircraft, but they did not suffer any additional losses. It was during that month he was awarded the title Hero of the Soviet Union. The next month he made 21 sorties, and during a mission on 15 December he fainted at 7000 meters. Upon regaining consciousness he had not special orientation and struggled to fly, so he closely tailed his wingman.

After the incident he stopped flying for the rest of the year, but less than a month later he returned to combat with a promotion to Major. On 23 January he was credited with shooting down an F-86, his last victory over Korea, and on 18 February 1952 he made his last sortie. He was never shot down. The exact number of sorties he flew is unclear, with western sources indicating 140 sorties and Russian sources indicating 175 sorties.

== Postwar ==
After the Korean War, Ponomaryov served in the Air Defense Forces in the Russian Far East. In April 1953 he became the navigator for guidance and control points of the 254th Fighter Aviation Division, and in May 1954 he was made deputy head of combat training planning in Komsomol-Khabarovsk. In December he was made a senior operations officer for the Air Defence Army in Amur, but in January 1957 he switched to the same post in the Air Army of the Russian Far East. In May that year he became the senior navigator for the staff operations division, and in 1960 he transferred to the 11th Separate Air Defense Army in Khabarovsk before retiring in 1968 with the rank of Lieutenant Colonel. (Note: He left active duty in 1968 with the rank of colonel, but while in the reserve he was promoted to colonel in 1975)

Upon leaving the military he moved to Kherson, where he became a factory foreman. In 1977 he became chairman of a DOSAAF district, and in 1985 he became part of the Kherson regional council. He died on 26 September 2006 at the age of 85.

== Awards ==
USSR

- Hero of the Soviet Union (13 November 1951)
- Order of Lenin (13 November 1951)
- Order of the Red Banner, twice (25 October 1944 and 10 October 1951)
- Order of the Patriotic War 1st class (11 March 1985)
- Order of the Red Star, twice (26 February 1955 and 22 February 1968)
- Medal "For Battle Merit" (15 November 1950)
- Medal "For the Defence of Leningrad" (22 December 1942)
- Medal "For the Victory over Germany in the Great Patriotic War 1941–1945" (9 May 1945)
- jubilee medals

Poland

- Cross of Valour
- Silver Cross of Merit
- Medal of Victory and Freedom 1945
- Medal "For Oder, Neisse and the Baltic"
