= Grigory Okhay =

Soviet Korean War flying ace

Grigory Ulyanovich Okhay
- Russian: Григорий Ульянович Охай; Ukrainian: Григорій Ульянович Охай
- Born: 5 January [O.S. 23 December 1916] 1917; Tokmak, Russian Empire
- Died: 8 February 2002; Dnipropetrovsk, Ukraine
- Military career
- Allegiance: Soviet Union
- Branch: Soviet Air Force
- Service years: 1935 – 1960
- Rank: Colonel
- Conflicts: World War II; Winter War; Eastern Front; Korean War
- Awards: Hero of the Soviet Union

Grigory Ulyanovich Okhay (Russian: Григорий Ульянович Охай, Ukrainian: Григорій Ульянович Охай; 5 January [O.S. 23 December 1916] 1917 – 8 February 2002) was a Soviet MiG-15 flying ace during the Korean war, with an estimated 11 victories.

== Early life ==
Okhay was born on 5 January [O.S. 23 December 1916] 1917 in Tomak to a Ukrainian peasant family. After completing his secondary school he entered a trade school, and in 1935 he completed on year of instruction at the Melitopol Pedagogical Institute shortly before being drafted into the military. In 1937 he graduated from the Voroshilovgrad Military Aviation School of Pilots, after which he was assigned to the 46th Bomber Regiment. In May 1939 he was transferred to the 1st Light Bomber Regiment.

== Military career ==
=== Winter War ===
In January 1940 he was deployed to the warfront of the Soviet-Finnish war as part of the 39th Bomber Regiment. During the conflict he flew 28 sorties on an SB bomber, attacking Finnish targets. Once the war ended he was transferred and began attending the Ryazan School of Navigators.

=== World War II ===
After completing training for the Yak-1 he served as a flight instructor in the 13th Reserve Fighter Wing in the early phase of the war. During that time he trained 85 pilots before entering the 897th Fighter Aviation Regiment. Most sources indicate that he had no aerial victories during the war, but he did fly in the Battle of Kursk.

=== Peacetime ===
In October 1945 Okhay was transferred to the 18th Guards Fighter Aviation Regiment, where he was a senior lieutenant and deputy squadron commander. In December that year he became a squadron commander in the 272nd Fighter Regiment, where he remained until switching to the 523rd Fighter Regiment.

=== Korean War ===
Shortly before being deployed to Northern China, Okhay was promoted in his regiment to deputy commander of training and combat tactics. During the war he shot down an estimated eleven aircraft over the course of 122 sorties and 68 dogfights in less than a year, flying the MiG-15. After his seventh shootdown he was nominated for the title Hero of the Soviet Union, which was awarded on 13 November 1951. He observed that the American Sabre performed better than the MiG-15 at lower altitudes but was disadvantaged at higher altitudes and took advantage of this information in combat.

== Later life ==
Okhay remained in the air force until 1960. After leaving the military he transferred to the field of civil aviation until retiring in 1978. He died in Dnipropetrovsk, Ukraine on 8 February 2002 and was buried in the Zaporozhye cemetery.

== Awards and decorations ==
- Hero of the Soviet Union (13 November 1951)
- Order of Lenin (13 November 1951)
- Order of the Red Banner (4 June 1955)
- Order of the Patriotic War 1st class (11 March 1985)
- Order of the Patriotic War 2nd class (28 November 1945)
- Two Order of the Red Star (15 November 1950 and 10 November 1951)
- Medal “For Courage” 20 May 1940
- Medal “For Battle Merit” (6 November 1946)
- campaign and jubilee medals

== See also ==
- List of Korean War flying aces
