= MiG Alley =

Site in North Korea known for dogfights during the Korean War

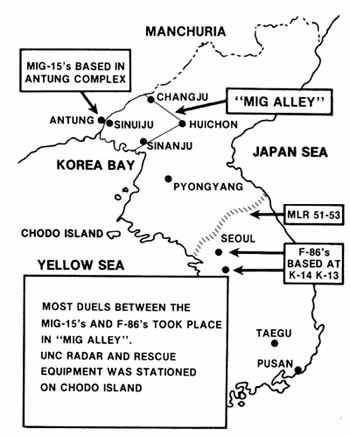
Map of aerial combat in Korean War.

"MiG Alley" was the name given by United Nations (UN) pilots during the Korean War to the northwestern portion of North Korea, where the Yalu River empties into the Yellow Sea. It was the site of numerous dogfights between UN fighter pilots and their opponents from North Korea (including some unofficially crewed by Soviet airmen) and the People's Republic of China. Soviet-built Mikoyan-Gurevich MiG-15 were the aircraft used during most of the conflict, and the area's nickname was derived from them. It was the site of the first large-scale jet-vs.-jet air battles, with the North American F-86 Sabre.

== History ==
=== 1950 ===
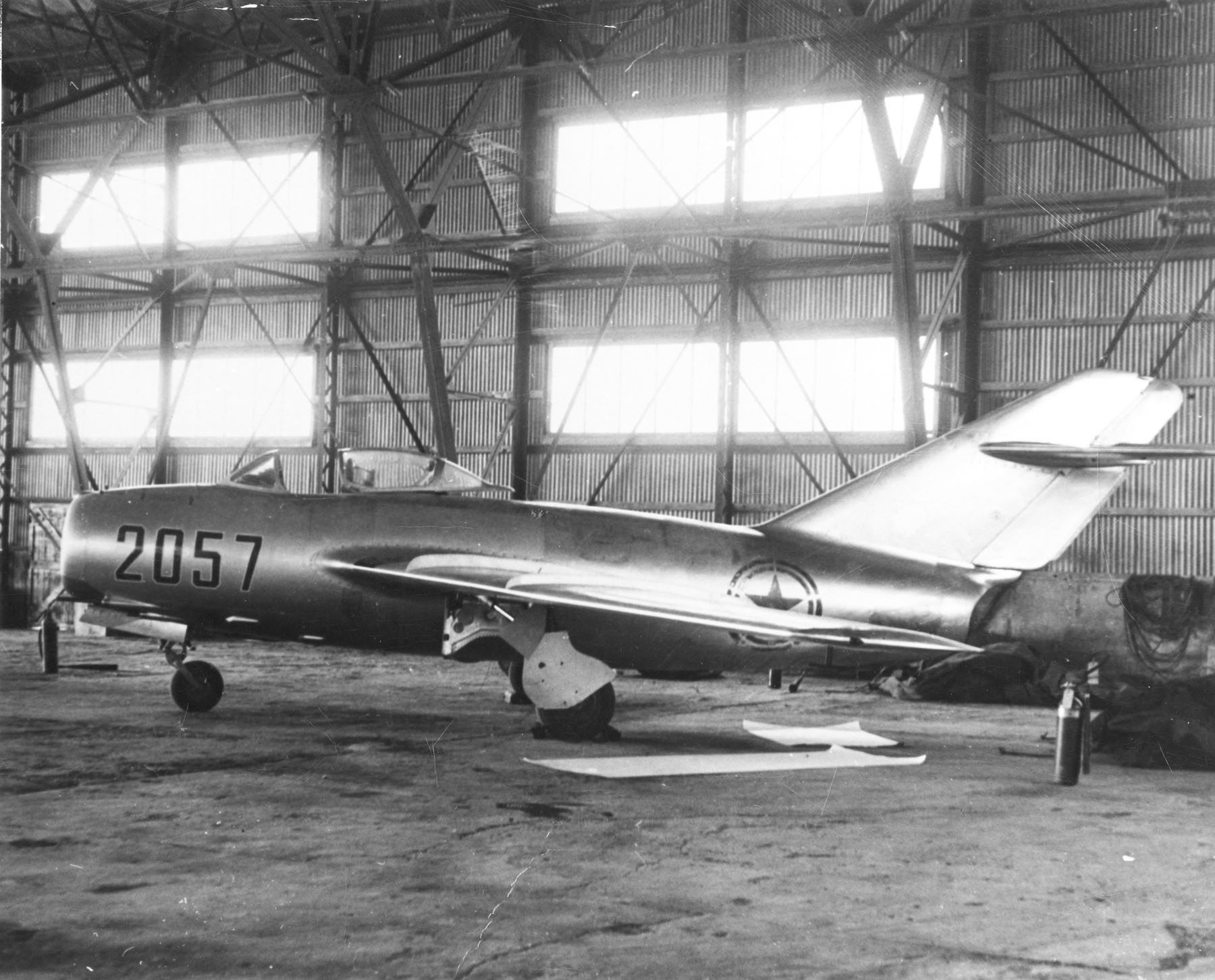
MiG-15 delivered by a defecting North Korean pilot to the US Air Force.

The North Koreans began their war against South Korea on June 25, 1950, with small numbers of Soviet aircraft retained from the Second World War. These were flown by under-trained and inexperienced pilots. After the United States and its closest allies committed its air units to the UN, the North Korean People's Army Air Force (KPAAF) was rapidly depleted. For several months, propeller-engined bombers and fighters, like the B-29 and P-51 Mustang – and early jet fighters like the F-80 Shooting Star, F-84 Thunderjet and Grumman F9F Panther – flew the skies over Korea virtually unopposed.

During October, the major Communist powers – China and the Soviet Union – commenced unofficial military support of North Korea. The Soviets also committed to supply North Korea and China with its latest MiG-15 fighters, and to train Korean and Chinese pilots to fly them. China officially entered the war in support of North Korea on October 25, 1950. While its strength in ground forces initially overwhelmed UN forces, the Chinese People's Liberation Army Air Force (PLAAF) was, at the time, small and no better equipped than the KPAAF.

While the Soviet Union never officially entered the war, on November 1, 1950, the 64th Fighter Aviation Corps (64 IAK) of the Soviet Air Forces was attached to the PLAAF, under the 1st United Air Army. That same day, Soviet-piloted MiG-15s began operating over North Korea and the first clashes between MiG-15s and US aircraft occurred, when eight aircraft from the Soviet Air Forces intercepted about 15 United States Air Force P-51 Mustangs flying a ground support mission. First Lieutenant Fiodor V. Chizh shot down and killed Mustang pilot First Lieutenant Aaron Richard Abercrombie. Later in the day, the first air combat between jets occurred, when three MiG-15s attacked about 10 USAF F-80s. While First Lieutenant Frank L. Van Sickle Jr., in a F-80C, was killed, a US record states that he was shot down by AA fire. First Lieutenant Semyon F. Khominich (referred to as Jominich in some sources) – was credited with a kill by the Soviet authorities. On November 9, 1950, a MiG-15 was destroyed in combat for the first time, when Lieutenant Commander William T. Amen of the US Navy, in a F9F-2B Panther, shot down and killed Captain Mikhail F. Grachev.

In response to the deployment of MiG-15s, the UN's P-51 squadrons began to convert to jet fighters. In the case of the USAF, this was the F-86 Sabre.

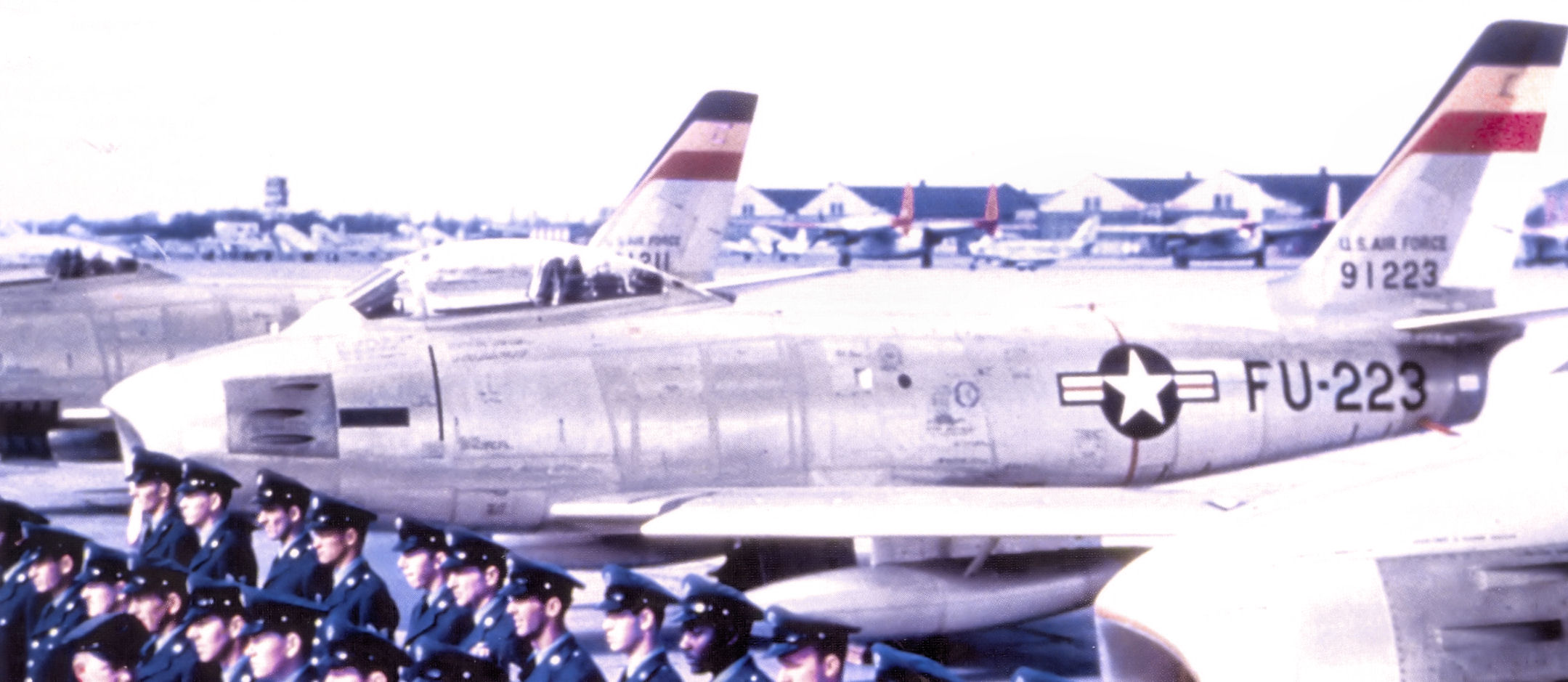
F-86A-5-NA Sabre 49-1223. This aircraft served with the 335th F-I Squadron, 4th F-IW in Korea. It was shot down by MiGs near Wonsan on February 3, 1952; the pilot ejected.

UN Command standing orders forbade pilots from crossing the Chinese border. On December 17, Lieutenant Colonel Bruce H. Hinton led a finger-four formation of Sabres from the 336th Fighter Squadron on a patrol, a 485-mile (780 km) round trip, along the Yalu River, in an attempt to draw the MiG pilots into combat. The Sabre pilots stayed below 475 mph (765 km/h), to create the impression on radar screens that the Sabres were a slower aircraft. The slower speed and two 120-US-gallon (450 L; 100 imp gal) drop tanks on each F-86 also provided maximum air time. Forty minutes after take-off the Sabres were approaching the Yalu at 32,000 feet (9,800 m). Four MiGs were spotted 7,000 feet (2,100 m) below the Sabres and about to pass beneath them. The Americans jettisoned their drop tanks and as the MiGs passed below, the Sabres turned to the left and dived down at the Soviet fighters. When the MiG pilots realized that their adversaries were not older jets that they could easily extend away from, they broke formation and headed for the border. Hinton caught up to the leader's wingman, Major Yakov Efromeenko, and fired 1,500 rounds of .50 caliber bullets. Smoke belched from its jet pipe and flames enveloped the tail section. After Efromeenko ejected, the MiG crashed about 10 miles (16 km) south of the Yalu.

On the morning of December 22, a Sabre was destroyed by a MiG-15 pilot for the first time. Captain Lawrence V. Bach's F-86 was hit in the wing root by cannon fire from an unknown MiG pilot and Bach was captured after ejecting. That afternoon, eight Sabres from the USAF 4th Fighter-Interceptor Wing (4th F-IW), operating out of a forward base at K-14 Kimpo (Gimpo), attacked an estimated 15 MiGs at 30,000 feet (9,100 m) and pursued some to the Yalu, claiming six without loss.

=== 1951–1953 ===
On January 1, 1951, a Communist offensive drove UN forces out of the Kimpo area; K-14 was overrun and the 4th F-IW was withdrawn to Japan. In March 1951, the first two Sabre squadrons, from the 4th F-IW, returned to Korea, just in time to meet a new build-up of Communist air strength designed to secure air superiority over northwest Korea, in a prelude to a major ground offensive.

While the Australian government had attempted to order the F-86, to replace Mustangs operated in Korea by No. 77 Squadron RAAF, North American was required to prioritize re-equipping the USAF. The British Gloster Meteor F.8 was the only viable alternative. 77 Squadron began converting to Meteors in Japan during April 1951.

USAF pilots nicknamed April 12, 1951 "Black Thursday", after 30 MiG-15s attacked 48 B-29 bombers escorted by approximately 100 F-80s and F-84s. The MiGs were fast enough to engage the B-29s and extend away from their escorts. Three B-29s were shot down and seven more were damaged, with no casualties on the communist side. Following this, USAF bomber sorties over Korea were halted for approximately three months. Bomber commanders were forced to discontinue daylight raids, and changed to night missions by small formations.

In the first five months of 1951 the 4th F-IW flew 3,550 sorties and claimed 22 victories. No F-86 Sabres were shot down by MiGs, although a number were lost due to accidents.

On July 10, 1951, truce talks between North Korean and UN representatives opened at Kaesong. The ground forces were virtually stalemated at the 38th parallel, but in the air the two squadrons of the 4th F-IW were flying the only Sabres in the theater. Some intelligence source estimated that 500 MiGs were being operated by the 1st United Air Army.

Although 77 Squadron RAAF had previously operated in Korea as a ground-attack unit, many of its pilots were veterans of World War II fighter units and it was expected that the Gloster Meteor would allow it to return to its previous role of interception. With 22 Meteors, 77 Squadron was attached to the USAF's 4th F-IW at Kimpo at the end of July. For a few weeks, MiG-15 pilots scrutinized the performance of the Meteors and used their superior speed to avoid engaging the Meteors. The first Meteor fatalities occurred on August 22, when two aircraft collided in mid-air as they returned to Kimpo after a sweep.

Meteor and MiG-15s pilots engaged each other for the first time on August 25, without either side scoring hits. Four days later, eight Meteors and 16 Sabres fought 12 MiGs; one Australian ejected after his aircraft was shot down, and a second Meteor was damaged. The following week, a Meteor suffered severe damage in a dogfight with MiGs. As a result of these losses, senior RAAF commanders decided to focus on escort and air defense sorties.

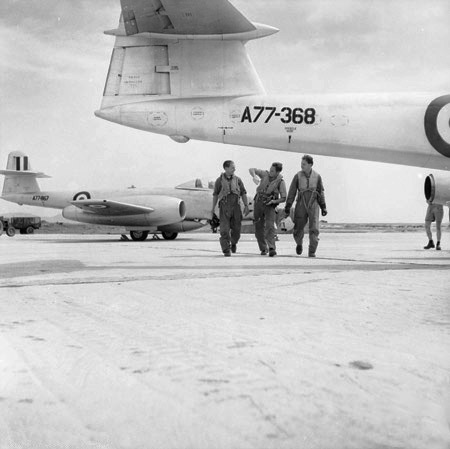
No. 77 Squadron pilots and their Meteors at Kunsan, South Korea, June 1954.

Flight Lieutenant R. L. "Smoky" Dawson registered No. 77 Squadron's first jet combat claim when he damaged a MiG during an escort mission near Anju, North Korea, on September 26, 1951. On October 27, Flying Officer Les Reading was credited with damaging another MiG while covering B-29s over Sinanju; it was subsequently confirmed as having been destroyed, making it the squadron's first MiG "kill". The squadron was awarded the Republic of Korea Presidential Unit Citation for "exceptionally meritorious service & heroism" on November 1.

On December 1, 1951, over Sunchon, at least 20 Soviet-piloted MiGs from the 176th Guards Fighter Air Regiment (176 GvIAP) attacked a formation of 14 Meteors. Both sides apparently overestimated the scale of the battle and the damage inflicted to their opponents: while three Meteors were lost, Soviet pilots claimed nine Meteors destroyed; Australian pilots claimed one MiG shot down and another damaged, from a formation of at least forty MiGs, while Russian sources suggest that all of the MiGs returned to base and less than 25 MiGs were available to 176 GvIAP at the time.

The F-86As and F-86Es of the 4th F-IW were now getting decidedly battle-worn and it was decided that the 51st Fighter-Interceptor Wing (51st F-IW) was able to commence operations from Suwon on December 1 under Colonel Francis S. "Gabby" Gabreski. Nonetheless, the 4th F-IW claimed 13 MiGs in air battles on December 13.

On December 26, 1951, the RAAF reassigned 77 Squadron to ground attack sorties, a role it would pursue until the end of the war. Its pilots continued to encounter MiGs and claimed two more victories over them, both in the Pyongyang area, on 4 and May 8, 1952.

By August 1952, the tide of battle above "MIG Alley" had turned in favor of the United Nations. During that month 63 MiGs were shot down for the loss of only nine Sabres. An important reason for the increasing superiority of UN air power was the new F-86F, which had been issued to two squadrons of the 51st Wing in June and July and began reaching the 4th Wing in September. This Sabre development had a more powerful J47 engine developing 5,910 lbf (26,300 N) thrust, wing shackles for 200-US-gallon (760 L; 170 imp gal) drop tanks (raising the combat radius to 463 miles or 745 kilometres) and a simplified A4 radar gun sight that was more efficient than the MkXVIII gyro sight used on most of the F-86As and easier to maintain than the rather unreliable A1CM radar sight fitted to late F-86As and Es.

One Meteor was shot down and another damaged by MiGs following a ground-attack mission on October 2, 1952. No. 77 Squadron was credited with downing its last MiG southeast of Pyongyang on March 27, 1953.

A special fighter-bomber variant of the F-86F arrived in Korea during January 1953 – the F-86-F-30 with dual stores mountings under each wing. This Sabre could carry either a 120-US-gallon (450 L; 100 imp gal) drop tank or a 1,000-pound (450 kg) bomb on the inner fittings, together with a 200-US-gallon (760 L; 170 imp gal) drop tank on each of the outboard points. The new fighter-bombers were issued to the 18th Fighter Bomber Wing, which included 2 Squadron, South African Air Force (previously a P-51 unit). In February the 8th Fighter Bomber Wing began to replace its F-80s with Sabre fighter-bombers.

On July 27, 1953, the ceasefire came into effect. By that time there were 297 Sabres in Korea facing an estimated 950 Sino-Korean MiGs. During the conflict the F-86 pilots claimed to have destroyed 792 MiGs in air-to-air combat for a loss of 78 Sabres – a phenomenal 10 to 1 kills-to-losses ratio. In September the defection of a MiG-15 pilot (with his aircraft) enabled US pilots to assess their erstwhile opponent at first hand. The MiG that Lieutenant No Kum-sok flew into Kimpo on September 21 was one of the later MiG-15SDs.

More recent research by Dorr, Lake and Thompson however has claimed the actual ratio is closer to 2 to 1. The Soviets claimed to have downed over 600 Sabres, together with the Chinese claims. A recent RAND report made reference to "recent scholarship" of F-86 v MiG-15 combat over Korea and concluded that the actual kill:loss ratio for the F-86 was 1.8 to 1 overall, and likely closer to 1.3 to 1 against MiGs flown by Soviet pilots. However, this ratio does not include the number of aircraft of other types (B-29, A-26, F-80, F-82, F-84...) were shot down by MiG-15s. Overall, the US lost 1,986 aircraft during the Korean War, most conservative estimates put 250 of these due to air-to-air combat.

== Soviet role ==
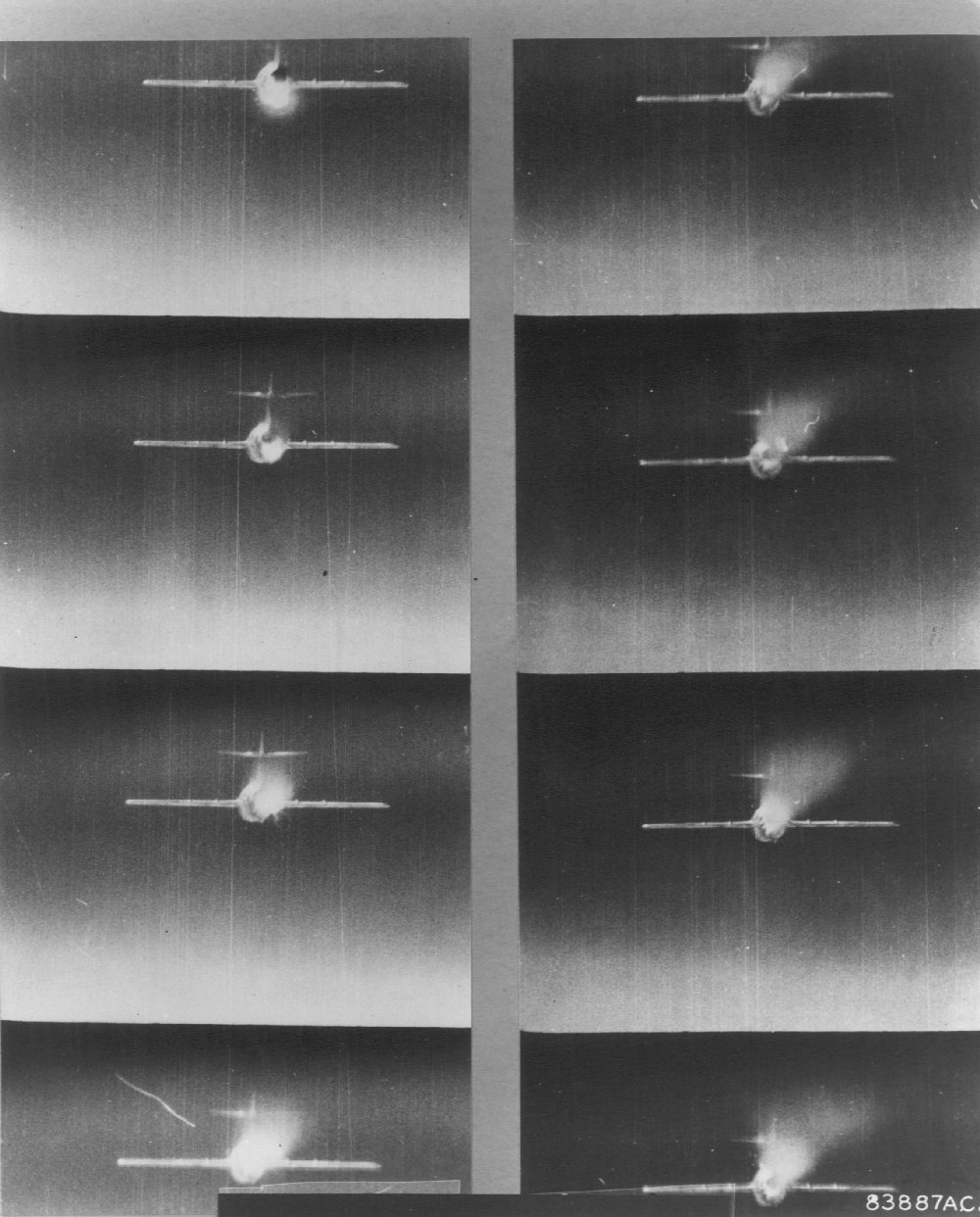
Gun camera strip showing Soviet MiG-15 over Korea, April 1953.

According to Budiansky, "In late March 1951, the 1st RSM (1st Radio Squadron, Mobile), still operating in Japan, picked up Russian ground controllers in voice communication with Soviet MiG fighter aircraft operating over North Korea. This became an "intelligence windfall", because "Soviet doctrine called for tight control of fighters by stations on the ground tracking the location of friendly and enemy aircraft on radar throughout the battle." These radio intercepts gave additional warning beyond the range of radar. This breakthrough in signals intelligence, centralized at a single USAFSS facility in Seoul, meant real-time listening of Russian controllers and fighters and the subsequent passing of information to U.S. pilots. "An analysis of ground control traffic in June 1952 concluded that more than 90 percent of MiGs engaged in air operations over North Korea were being flown by Russians."

The Soviet Union kept the participation of their aircrews in the Korean War secret for many years, though it was widely suspected by UN forces. Soviet aircraft were adorned with North Korean or Chinese markings and pilots wore either North Korean uniforms or civilian clothes, to disguise their origins. For radio communication, they were given cards with common Korean words for various flying terms spelled out phonetically in Cyrillic characters. These subterfuges did not long survive the fury of air-to-air combat, however, and pilots were soon heard communicating in Russian.

Soviet MiG-15 regiments were based on Chinese fields in Manchuria, where, according to existing UN rules of engagement, they could not be attacked. Many Soviet regiments underwent preliminary training at Soviet bases in the neighboring Soviet Maritime Military District. Soviet air defense troops also began to arrive along the Yalu, setting up radar installations, ground control centers, searchlights and large numbers of anti-aircraft guns to deter any attacks on the Chinese airfields.

While UN pilots chafed at the restrictions imposed on attacking the MiG's Chinese airfields, it wasn't known until many years later that the MiG pilots themselves operated under tight restrictions. To preserve the impression that Soviet pilots were not fighting in Korea, they were prohibited from flying over non-Communist-controlled territory or within 30 to 50 miles (50–80 km) of the Allied front lines. One Soviet pilot who was shot down in UN-controlled territory shot himself with his pistol rather than be taken captive. Another pilot who bailed out into the Yellow Sea was strafed to prevent him from being captured. Soviet pilots were not allowed to pursue UN aircraft over the UN-controlled Yellow Sea.

In spite of the restrictions, many US pilots took advantage of a "hot pursuit" exception to flying over China to pursue MiGs across the Yalu River. Later, "hot pursuit" became active MiG hunting over Manchuria, with US pilots maintaining a "code of silence" about the patrols. Flight leaders chose wingmen who would keep quiet, and many rolls of incriminating gun camera footage "mysteriously" disappeared.

The UN conducted Operation Moolah to entice Communist pilots, especially Soviet pilots, to defect to South Korea with a MiG-15. The operation was intended to gain an analysis of the MiG-15's flight performance, as well as serve a psychological purpose undermining the Soviet pilots.

With the end of the Cold War Soviet participation in the Korean war became widely recognized as pilots who participated in the conflict revealed their role.

== Aftermath ==
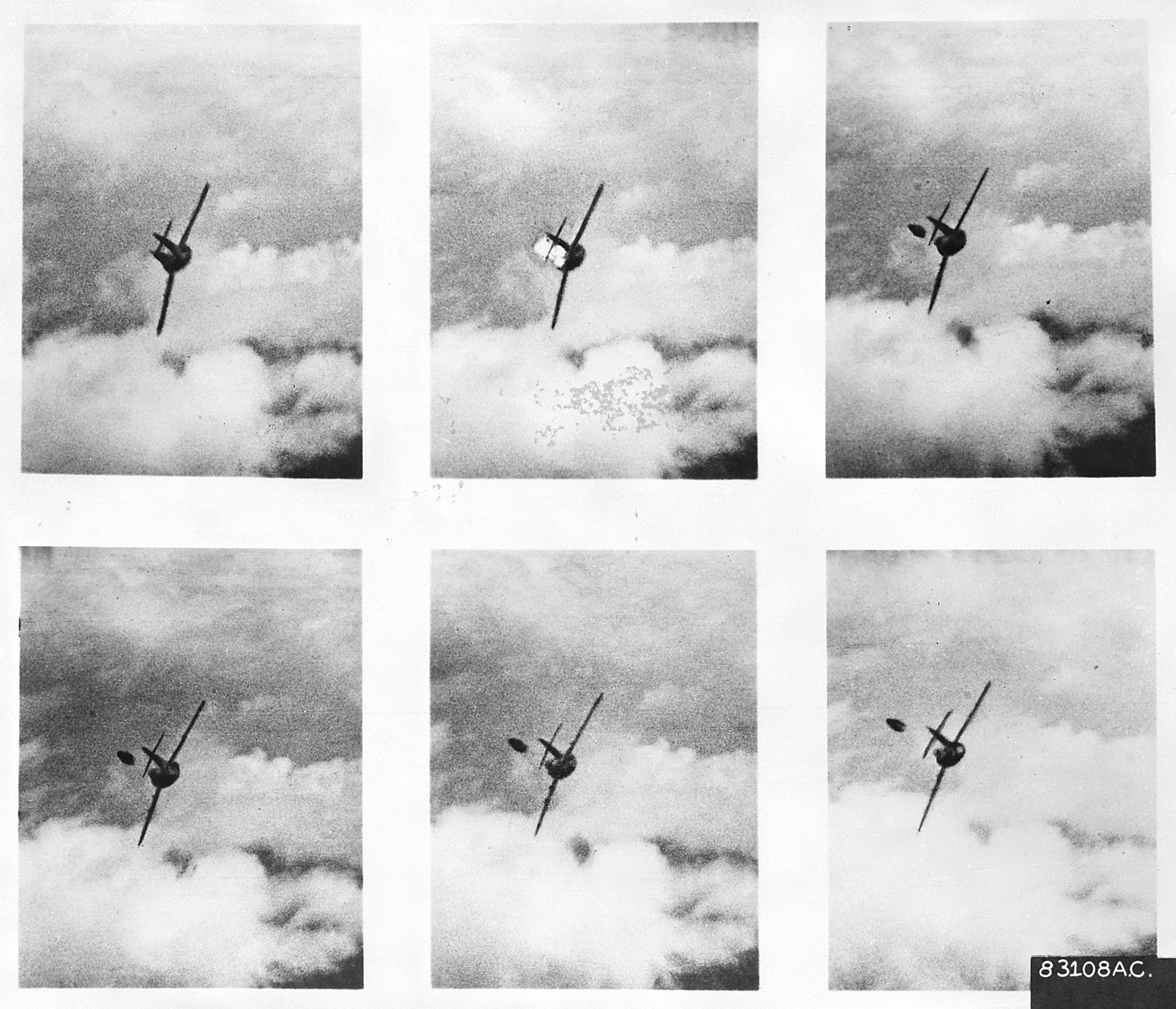
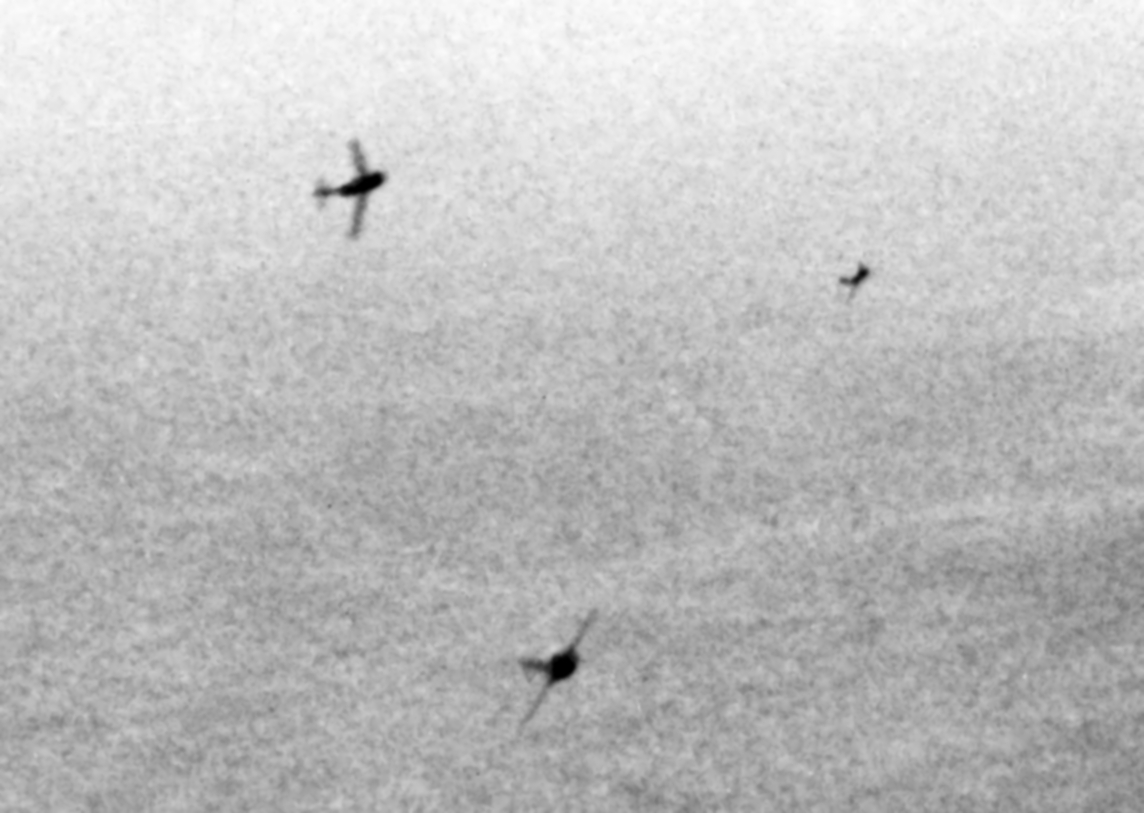
F-86 engaging a MiG-15 (left) and MiG-15s engaging a B-29 (right)

The MiG Alley battles produced many fighter aces. The top aces were Russian. Nikolay Sutyagin claimed 21 kills, including nine F-86s, one F-84 and one Gloster Meteor in less than seven months. His first kill was the F-86A of Robert H. Laier on June 19, 1951 (listed by the Americans as missing in action), and his last was on January 11, 1952, when he shot down and killed Thiel M. Reeves, who was flying an F-86E (Reeves is also listed as MIA). Other famous Soviet aces include Yevgeni G. Pepelyayev, who was credited with 19 kills, and Lev Kirilovich Shchukin, who was credited with 17 kills, despite being shot down twice himself.

The top UN ace of the war, Captain Joseph C. McConnell, claimed 16 MiGs, including three in one day. His story featured in a film called The McConnell Story, starring Alan Ladd and June Allyson. The second-highest-scoring UN ace, Major James Jabara, was the first UN jet-vs.-jet ace. Another ace, Frederick C. "Boots" Blesse, claimed nine MiG-15s in his F-86 Sabre and later wrote No Guts, No Glory, a manual of air fighter combat that is still studied today. James P. Hagerstrom claimed 8.5 kills. George Andrew Davis, Jr. became one of the first members of the new U.S. Air Force to receive the Medal of Honor after being killed while leading his section of two F-86s against 12 MiG-15s when he was trying to shoot them all down.

Aces also emerged from the newly established People's Liberation Army Air Force of China. Among them was Zhao Baotong, the first Chinese pilot to achieve ace status.

Over thirty Sabre pilots were claimed to have been shot down behind enemy lines and their fates have never been definitively established. Surviving pilots, captured and later repatriated after the armistice, reported being interrogated by Koreans, Russians, and Chinese. For years after the Korean War ended in 1953, rumors persisted of pilots held captive by the Soviets.

A number of computer video games based on the combat in MiG Alley have been produced, amongst them MiG Alley Ace, released by MicroProse in 1983.

== See also ==
- List of Korean War flying aces
- MiG Alley (video game) – flight simulation computer game based on the air combat in MiG Alley
