= Sergey Kramarenko (pilot) =

Soviet Air Force officer (1923–2020)

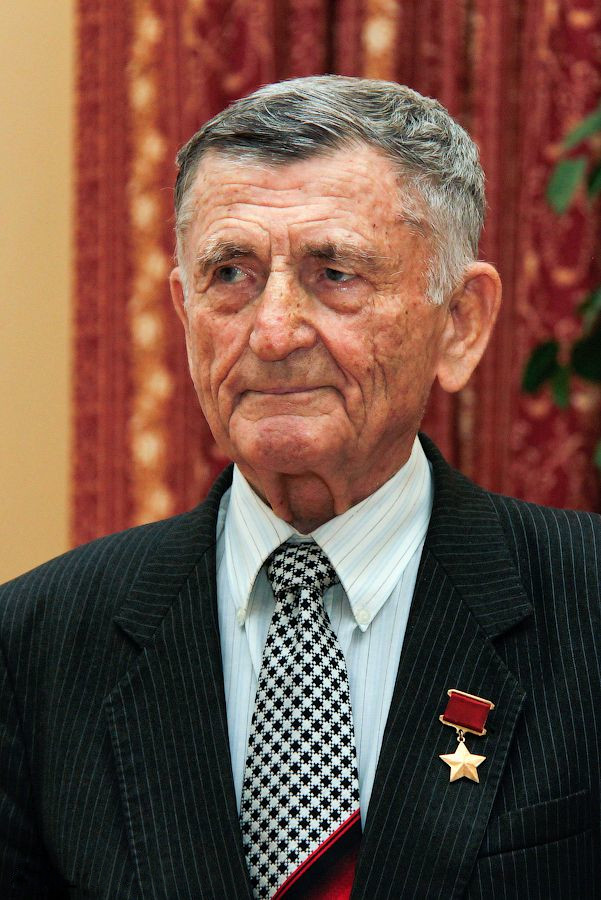
- Born: Sergei Makarovich Kramarenko; 10 April 1923; Kalynivka, Sumy Oblast, Ukrainian SSR
- Died: 21 May 2020 (aged 97); Russia
- Military career
- Allegiance: USSR
- Branch: Soviet Air Force
- Service years: 1941 — 1977
- Rank: Major General of Aviation
- Commands: 167th Guards Fighter Aviation Regiment
- Conflicts: World War II; Korean War
- Awards: Hero of the Soviet Union
- Other work: Memoirs: Protiv Messerov i Seybrov. V Nebe Dvukh Voyn (Against Messerschmitts and Sabre Jets. In the Sky of Two Wars), 2006.

Sergei Makarovich Kramarenko (Russian: Серге́й Макарович Крамаренко; 10 April 1923 – 21 May 2020) was a Soviet Air Force officer who fought in World War II and the Korean War. For his service in Korea he became a holder of the Title of Hero of the Soviet Union. He achieved several high command positions in the USSR and was also Air Force advisor in Iraq and Algeria in the 1970s. Retired in 1977 with the rank of major-general, he lived with his family in Moscow.

He was the last living Soviet flying ace of Korean War.

== Childhood and encounter with aviation ==
Sergei Kramarenko was born on 10 April 1923 in the village of Kalynivka in Sumy Oblast, Ukraine, the eldest of three sons of Makar Kramarenko and Nadezhda Galkovskaya. His parents were divorced when he and his brothers were still children and he went with his mother and brothers to live first in the Caucasus, and later to a kolkhoz near the Volga river.

During the 1930s the young Kramarenko listened to radio broadcasts about the deeds of Soviet airmen like Valery Chkalov and Georgy Baydukov, and so decided to become a pilot. In the autumn of 1940 he began a flying course at the Dzerzhinsky aeroclub, and as one of the 80 who graduated with the highest marks was offered the opportunity to become a military pilot. Kramarenko accepted and began military training on 1 April 1941 at Borisoglebsk aerodrome.

== World War II - Soviet-German Front ==
Sergei Kramarenko first saw action in late November 1942 over Stalingrad, as part of the 523rd Fighter Aviation Regiment, equipped with the LaGG-3. Like most inexperienced fliers, he began as wingman to more experienced pilots, such as Capt. Mikhail Baranovskiy and Lt. Yury Ryzhov. In early 1943 his unit was re-equipped with the Lavochkin La-5, which performance-wise proved to be on a par with the German Fw 190 and Bf 109.

=== First aerial victory ===
On 23 February 1943 he was flying as wingman in a flight led by Capt. Baranovskiy when they engaged a group of dive-bomber Ju 87 Stukas. Several escorting Fw 190s jumped his element leader Ryzhov and he promptly rushed to assist:

In that moment in front of me, with a left turn at 100-150 meters arrived two unknown aircraft of green color - in their fuselages were black crosses. In spite it was the first time I saw them, immediately I knew they were two Fw 190s. As soon as they finished their turn, one of them began to shoot at my leader. I opened fire against the trailing airplane and I saw shell strikes all over the aircraft. I watched that suddenly it went upwards turning, and his leader after him. Right then, ahead of me from the left went by tracers. I looked to the left and saw that 300 meters behind at the left were two Focke-Wulfs. They shoot right at me, and the tracers of their aircraft get closer and closer to my airplane. What should I do? To climb was impossible, because there were two more Focke-Wulfs. Immediately broke to the left, underneath the tracers. I dove [...] Many years later, while I described this episode to a journalist friend of mine, he told me that he saw in German memoirs a report of the leader of that Schwarm. [...] After the combat with me, while returning home, one of his pilots, because of unexplainable reasons, got into a dive and crashed into the ground. I realized that one of the shells of my cannons hit the pilot's cockpit and wounded the pilot, who because of the loss of blood fainted and crashed to his death.

Kramarenko's first victory claim was Fw 190A-3 (WkNr 2265) of Oberfeldwebel Karl Stadeck, (of 2./JG 51 "Mölders"), who was killed. He claimed while flying Lavochkin La-5 "Red 34".

=== Downed, wounded, captured and rescued ===
On 19 March 1944 three La-5FNs of the 19th Fighter Aviation Regiment intercepted a group of Ju 88 bombers escorted by six Bf 110 fighters. Kramarenko's leader - Pavel Maslyakov - shot down one of the Junkers, but was in return jumped by one of the Bf 110s. Kramarenko was ready to cover him, scoring hits on the Messerschmitt. He then fell prey to the Bf 110 wingman, who set his aircraft on fire and forced him to bail out with severe burns to face and hands.

Kramarenko was captured almost immediately by German troops, and as he was unwilling to answer the questions of his SS interrogator he was to be executed. Fortunately for Kramarenko the order was cancelled at the last minute by a Wehrmacht General, who ordered also that Kramarenko be sent to a German field hospital. Two weeks later Kramarenko was rescued by Soviet troops liberating the hospital.

=== Service in Kozhedub's 176th Guards Fighter Aviation Regiment ===
After several months of convalescence in a Moscow burns hospital, he returned to his regiment (now redesignated 176th Guards Fighter Aviation Regiment). Kramarenko was appointed wingman to the Regiment navigator Major Aleksandr Kumanichkin, already an ace with 35 aerial victories ( he claimed five more in Korea). Both men were aggressive and disciplined in the air and they became a lethal team. He flew Kumanichkin's wing for several of the ace's victories, and shared some of them. On 16 April 1945 Kramarenko scored his second full victory: a Fw 190 over Eastern Prussia. The aircraft he flew that day was the Lavochkin La-7 "Red 27", of the regimental executive officer Major Ivan Kozhedub. Kozhedub had lent Kramarenko his aircraft because he was not scheduled to fly and no other aircraft was available.

== Interwar period ==
In 1946 the 176th Guards Fighter Aviation Regiment was redeployed to the aerodrome of Tyoply Stan on the south-west outskirts of Moscow and was among the first units to receive the new prop-driven La-9, the jet-propelled La-15, and in late 1949 the MiG-15. Already the deputy commander of the 3rd squadron, Kramarenko flew the MiG-15 during the 1950 May Day fly-past over the Kremlin and Red Square, and on 14 August over Tushino airbase.

== The Korean War (1950–53) ==
In early October 1950 the 176th Guards Fighter Aviation Regiment were called to a meeting in the Officers' Club at Tyoply Stan by General Redkin, the Executive Officer of the Air Defense of Moscow, with Vasily Stalin also attending. Redkin detailed the critical situation in North Korea, with American B-29 heavy bombers bombing the poorly defended North Korean cities. The Soviet-backed Democratic People's Republic of Korea had officially requested Soviet assistance. When asked for volunteers all pilots, including Kramarenko, raised their hands. The unit was soon deployed to Korea. Soviet involvement would be a secret until well after the end of the Cold War.

Travelling across Siberia, Kozhedub's 324th Fighter Aviation Division (made up of the 176th Guards Fighter Aviation Regiment and 196th Fighter Aviation Regiment) arrived in the city of Dunfyn, where they were given Chinese uniforms to wear. The Soviet fliers received their first salary in Chinese currency which they spent at local markets, buying civilian clothing to replace the Chinese uniforms. An intense period of air-to-air training in the MiG-15 followed. The Russians trained alongside Chinese pilots in the nearby airbase of Mukden. Kozhedub brought Kramarenko with him and personally checked the training of their Chinese and Korean apprentices. Kramarenko remembered the poor training of the Chinese students who could barely perform even basic training flights. Both he and Kozhedub also realized the meager diet of rice they received was a problem. As soon as the Chinese rations were replaced by meat and other high-calorie food the situation improved.

=== First victories ===
Both regiments of the 324th Fighter Aviation Division redeployed to the forward airbase at Antung, and entered into battle in early April 1951. On 3 April they suffered three losses for no victories, although on 4 April 1951 Fyodor Shebanov managed to shoot down an F-86 and the pilot captured.

Kramarenko noted that the main reason for such a defeat was their failure to enter Korean airspace at higher altitude and superior speed in comparison with American aircraft. Yevgeny Pepelyaev, (commander of the 196th Fighter Regiment) and Sergey Vishnyakov (executive officer of the 176th Fighter Regiment) instructed the MiG pilots to jump the American formations in co-ordinated attacks from different directions. Now with these coordinated attacks and both height and high speed the MiG-15 fliers had combat conditions in their favor.

These tactics were tested on 12 April 1951 when 44 MiG-15s of the 176th Guards Fighter Aviation Regiment and 196th Fighter Aviation Regiment faced an American formation made up of 48 B-29s escorted by 96 jet fighters. Against these uneven odds the Soviet fliers claimed some 10 B-29s, 3 F-80s, and 1 F-86 shot down. Kramarenko's first victory in Korea was the F-80C of Captain A. B. Swanson (18th ABG). Kramarenko's second victory in the Korean sky occurred on 2 June, as he recalls:

In such conditions (on 2 and 17 June [1951] I managed to shoot down some Sabres. For example, reminded me the following combat: We flew in a zveno [a flight, a 4-airplanes formation] in the area assigned to patrol, having performed some circuits, when we spotted a group of eight Sabres, heading in a head-on course. We maneuvered to gain altitude and turned around to attack them from the rear hemisphere, but the Sabres spotted us and turned around too. A quartet kept on flying straight, and I with a dive began to chase the aircraft of the rearmost quartet. Two Sabres went to left, and two to the right; Lazutin's pair attacked the pair on the left, and went towards the right. The Sabres began to dive, but by then the range had decreased, and at about 400 meters I open fire. I see hits all over the Sabre wingman, which releasing smoke kept on diving. My wingman jumped the second Sabre, but his aircraft began to shake, due to the speed had almost reached 1.000 km/h, and consequently missed. We got out of the dive, and we saw that below remained only one Sabre - no trace of the second. Soon the ground control confirmed us, that he fell.

His victory was probably confirmed by the interception of American radio dialogue: the F-86A Bu.No 49-1130 of Thomas C. Hanson (336th FIS, Killed), although USAF records list the aircraft as lost in an accident shortly after take-off.

=== Clash of Titans ===
On 17 June 1951 Kramarenko and his six wingmen almost fell in an American ambush when they engaged eight Sabres who were acting as bait for three more F-86s lying in wait and ready to attack from above. What follows is Kramarenko's account of the duel he had against an American ace of World War II:

"Then the Sabres changed to another tactic. Individual pairs of their most experienced pilots would sit off to the side, and when combat was joined would pounce on the trailing aircraft of our group, and frequently shoot them down. [...]

My flight was flying to reinforce the strike group in the lead battle. As we got to the place of combat, the enemy were just finishing up moving out over the sea. Our side was also running out of fuel, and they were heading for home. As we got there, we could see an eight of Sabres coming right at us at the same altitude. Without thinking, I gave the command “Let’s attack them” and turned at a nearly 90 degree bank to wind up 600 meters behind this group. It was just as I got the leader in my sights and gave him a burst that I got a sensation of that something was behind me. That sensation made me turn right and look behind me, and what it was I do not know to this day. Perhaps I had seen something. But inexplicable as it was, there I now saw less than 100 meters behind me the huge nose of a Sabre and the blasts and tracers of its six machine guns firing at me. Without thinking, in the space of a few hundredths of a second I reacted automatically, and my MiG momentarily did a half roll, dropping into a dive. While in the dive, I looked back and saw a group consisting of three Sabres right behind me in a dive.[...]

I could have initiated a dive, but I had been told that the Sabre was heavier than the MiG, so it should dive better. Because of that, to dive wasn't an option. Then I saw right in front of me a cluster of saving clouds. My only choice was to head my aircraft towards one of them. Once inside the cloud, I made a very sharp turn of 90° to the left, I got out of the clouds and performed a right turn. I supposed that the lead Sabre would have thought that my MiG would keep on diving straight after getting out of the cloud. And that was exactly what happened. Now, below me, there were these three Sabres, which were looking for me downwards. Without losing not even a second, I jumped them. I have turned the tables. Now it was my turn to attack. But somehow they spotted me and immediately they split: the wingmen performed a diving turn to the left, and the leader a climbing right turn. This tactic allowed them to neutralize my attack and to transform me into their prey: it was a trap. Whichever one I attacked, I would be forced to turn my tail to the others and then they would get me under fire. What was I to do? I could climb up and give battle, but I did not want to get into this interesting and tricky situation: if you are going to do battle with strong pilots, with the Sabre wing commander, you had better be in a better position.

It is true that they were 3, but it didn't matter to me: I was very self-confident in my skills and my MiG. But now, I needed to decide fast who I should to attack. Should I attack the pair which was diving, or the Sabre which was climbing? If I jumped the first ones, the latter would dive after me and he would shoot me down. That's why I chose the latter, because it was closer and was making a climbing turn to the right. So, I dived and soon I put myself behind him, I aimed, and at a distance of about 600 meters, I opened up. To slow down and to hold my fire until I got closer was impossible, because the two remaining Sabres could catch me. My shells struck the Sabre. Evidently, some of the projectiles had hit it close to the engine, because the aircraft began to leave a trail of dark-gray smoke. The Sabre began to descend, and later entered in a steep dive.

I could not see the entire fall, because when I looked back, I saw a couple of Sabres at 500 meters. A little bit longer, and both would open fire with their 12,7 mm (0,50") machine guns. Evidently, that was when I made a mistake. I should have increased my angle of climbing and lead the Sabres to high altitude, where the MiG had the advantage. But I came to that conclusion only a long time later. At that time I reversed my heading, passed over the Sabres and in a slight dive I led my aircraft towards a small group of clouds. Once there I turned to the right and when I got out of them, I started a ‘Boyevoy Razvorot [‘Combat Turn’, a climbing turn with a roll angle of 40-50°] to the left, but I didn’t find the Sabres below where I expected them to be, but behind at my left. [...]

I threw my aircraft in a dive, but instead of a sharp pull-up into a climb I began to slowly roll my aircraft into a flat dive. The Sabres, who didn’t expect that, stayed at the height, far above and behind.

I dived to the right towards the hydroelectric station over the Yalu river [this station is referred in the Russian cartography as Suphun hydroelectric station, and as Suiho Dam/Reservoir in the American one – Note of the authors]. This huge reservoir had a dam of 300 meters height and a power station which provided energy not only to half of Korea but also the whole North-East of China. Precisely it was the main target we should protect. Besides us, their defense consisted in a dozen of anti-aircraft batteries, which had the order to shoot at any airplane which get closer to the dam.

I had the hope that the gunners of these batteries would help me to get these Sabres off my tail. And that was what happened: the gunners carried out their order to open fire at any intruder, and in front of me there appeared a dark cloud caused by the detonation of the anti-aircraft shells. I didn’t want to evade that cloud, because the Sabres would reduce the distance and they would shoot me down. At that moment I preferred to eventually die at the hands of my fellow gunners, rather than by the bullets of the Sabres, so I headed for the very center of a cloud. The aircraft tore into the cloud. Once inside and away from the shell bursts I immediately swung the aircraft from side to side, up and down. Grabbing the stick, I pulled back on it. The result was that the wings fluttered a bit.

But after several tens of seconds passed, suddenly I was once again out in the sunshine. The aircraft had punched through the black cloud. Behind and below me were the dam and the reservoir. Off to the left I could see the departing Sabres, who, having lost me in the cloud, perhaps figured I was dead. Following me had proven to be useless, the sea was near, and not wanting a new fight, even though I had come close to passing out from the stress. In order to not lose consciousness I focused my attention in front of me and pinched the arteries in my neck, as I did not want the blood to leave my head. It was far easier for the Sabre pilots to take this stress – they had a special anti-G suit which, when it sensed increased stress on the pilot, filled with air and, grasping him tightly, prevented the blood from leaving his head. Up until then our designers had never thought of such an idea.

I circled the airfield a couple of times, landed and then, taxiing over to the hardstand, saw my wingmen. They, having lost me during the sharp turn, continued to go after the eight Sabres, but when they got to the coastline had to turn back, searched for me, and not finding me, returned to the airfield.

Subsequent examination of my gun camera footage showed good hits on the Sabre. Ground command reported where it had impacted.”

The Sabre downed by Kramarenko was the F-86A BuNo 49-1281 of Lt.Col. Glenn T. Eagleston (4th FIG's commander, a famed World War II ace with 18.5 Luftwaffe kills while flying the P-47 Thunderbolt and P-51 Mustang, and two victories against MiGs in Korea), who belly-landed his jet at Kimpo Airbase South Korea. The jet was damaged beyond repair and was written off. The leader of the two Sabres who came to assist Eagleston was also a notable combat pilot: Lt.Col. Bruce Hinton, the first Sabre pilot to shoot down a MiG on 17 December 1950.

=== Hero of the Soviet Union ===
The 324th Fighter Aviation Division had been fighting without a respite since April. During August it was allowed to rest for a month. When the unit came back into the fight, Kramarenko soon claimed new victories:

- 12 September 1951: he got credit for an F-80 kill, the F-84E bu. no. 49-2399 of Captain Chapman (136th FBW), who ejected over Korea Bay.
- 22 September 1951: he claimed a Sabre. In actuality he had seriously damaged the F-86A bu. no. 49-1158 (4th FIW), but this jet survived and could be salvaged.
- 30 October 1951: one more jet was claimed – F-84E bu. no. 51-615 of the 49th FBW (the unnamed flier was rescued).

Kramarenko was postulated to be awarded the Zolotaya Svezda, which is given with the title of Geroy Sovietskogo Soyuza (Hero of the Soviet Union). He was finally decorated with this award on 10 November 1951 by the Chairman of the Presidium of the Supreme Soviet of the USSR, Nikolai Shvernik. On his return to the skies over Korea, Kramarenko kept on scoring victories:

- 1 December 1951: he claimed two Gloster Meteor F.8s of No. 77 Squadron RAAF. In fact, he damaged Meteor s/n A77-559 – piloted by F/Sgt Bill Middlemiss – which later returned to service, and shot down Meteor s/n A77-251, causing Pilot Officer Vance Drummond RAAF to bail out and become a POW. Kramarenko believed he could have shot down a third aircraft that day; he and his wingman pulled behind another Meteor, within firing range and the pilot seemed completely unaware of his presence. However, Kramarenko felt that he and his team had already won the battle that day and that there was no need to draw more blood. He ordered his wingman, Ikar Gulyy to disengage.
- 12 January 1952: he was credited with two F-86 kills in two separate engagements. The first claim matches with a US aircraft lost: F-86E bu. no. 50-615 of Paul G. Ridgeway (334th FIS), though USAF records attribute the loss to an engine failure.
- 16 January 1952: Kramarenko scored his last confirmed victory over Teiju; an aircraft that crashed near the village of Un-Denri. The identity of the downed aircraft has remained unclear; Kramarenko believed it to be a Sabre, although USAF records suggest it was more likely an F-80 Shooting Star. He recalled this victory:
  After takeoff and climb to altitude we saw the entire sky was filled with moving dots. We dropped our tanks and hit the throttles, and our MiGs went into combat. Immediately the regiment broke up into several groups and pairs. I and my six were following the group commander’s flight, which were attacking a group of Sabres flying an intersecting course from below the Sabres. At that moment his group found itself under attack from a flight of Sabres. I gave the command to my wingman to repulse the attack, and we proceeded to cut through their flight. A long burst in front of the Sabres forced them to break off the attack and climb away. I gave the command to Lazutin to go after them, while I and my wingman turned to follow the group commander, who had opened fire as he closed on the Sabres, but they made a sharp maneuver to avoid his fire and split up. One flight went into steep left bank, and the other did the same to the right. Vishnyakov’s flight split up as well and began to go after both groups as pairs. At that moment his pair was jumped from above by a pair of Sabres, who literally popped up about 300-400 meters from me. I immediately went over to get on their tails. The Sabres rolled over and went into a dive. I ordered Gogolev, my third pair leader, “Cover the commander...” and tried to go after the Sabres. I could see that the Sabres were holding a dive at an angle of about 60 degrees – I aimed at them and immediately gave one of them a burst. I saw the shells detonate in the area of the cockpit, and there was clearly black smoke now visible inside the cockpit; the Sabre’s dive angle increased and he kept ongoing down. At that moment, Gulyy called me: "I’m spinning!" I looked behind me and saw his aircraft nearly inverted. I gave the command: "Hit your air brakes! Pull out!" I saw Gulyy pull out of the inverted position and we then went into a dive, climbed back up to altitude, and returned home.

While USAF records suggest no Sabre was lost on that date, an F-80C was lost and the pilot MIA. In 2002, the US-Russia Joint Commission for POW/MIA interviewed Kramarenko, with regard to this shoot down. He commented: "fifty years later a special group carrying out a search for American pilots who were missing in action asked me if the pilot ... I shot down had bailed out. I could only repeat what I wrote above."

=== Shot down ===
On 17 January 1952 Kramarenko flew his last combat mission in Korea. During it he damaged an F-86, but was not only shot down himself but also fired upon by the Sabre flier while he was hanging defenseless in his parachute. He himself describes the events:

“17 January was a heavy day for me. The radar station picked up the approach of a group of ground attack aircraft on their way to Anju. Our regiment was sent out to repulse them. Arriving in the area of combat operations, we just spotted the last group of Thunderjets sliding along above the clouds to our south. Vishnyakov went to go after them, but we were not able to attack as the Thunderjets went into a cloud and we found ourselves over the coastline. Not seeing the usual Sabre escort, we made a left turn and began a level climb and had just turned around when I spotted two groups of Sabres diving down to attack Vishnyakov. We were engaging under the most unfavorable conditions, but nevertheless we beat off the first attack of the Sabres and, by using maneuver, climbed back up to about 9000 meters. At that moment another group of Sabres showed up, and moved to come down to attack the regimental commander’s group from above. As for me, as I virtually had no speed due to the climb, managed to increase my climb angle and at 600 meters I opened fire on the Sabre group leader. His aircraft ran through my tracers, and I saw several explosions on it. He increased his dive and angle and headed down. Turning around, I saw that my group was also being attacked from above by a group of Sabres. I gave the command: “Everybody break!” and we turned under the Sabres, but now I saw that my rear wingman, Senior Lieutenant Voronoy, was being fired on by two Sabres. Voronoy went into a sharp dive and headed down. I returned to the battle. At that moment my third pair came under attack from two Sabres coming down from above which, as they opened fire, cut through them and headed out directly towards above me. I followed them, firing at the wingman. He, evidently damaged, turned and banked over into a dive. I was not able to go after the damaged aircraft, as I suddenly felt a sharp blow and the aircraft around me began to rapidly spin. I kicked hard left rudder, but the controls did not respond. It was so sudden that one wing suddenly broke off. I made the decision to bail out of the uncontrollable aircraft, as it was now in a vertical spin downward. With a great deal of difficulty – as I was rammed into the left side of the aircraft – I managed to get my hand on the ejection seat control lever and pull it. A sharp blow momentarily pressed down on my eyes, so I have no idea how I flew out of the aircraft. As I came back to life I was falling together with the seat, I released the harness and kicked out of the seat with my legs. I could see that the clouds below me were coming up rapidly, so I pulled on the parachute ripcord ring, and after I yanked it the canopy opened. I came to a sharp halt, and now I was floating under the parachute. Above me was the blue sky, below me the clouds. They were about 800 meters below. I glanced around and saw a Sabre coming at me very quickly. He came on for a few more seconds, and suddenly I saw the smoke and tracers that he was firing his six machine guns. Death was coming for me, and all I could do was wait as he came after me. Fortunately, the Sabre was about 800-1000 meters away, and the tracers flew by tens of meters below me. But for those very few seconds the tracers began to head up towards my legs and only stopped a few meters away. Perhaps at the last second I could pull my legs up at the moment that I felt the bullets were about to hit my legs. But at that precise moment the tracers stopped. I could see the Sabre bank away sharply when 500 meters away, and passing about 50 meters away from me, make a quick turn. I got nauseous from his jet exhaust as he passed. I saw the Sabre make another turn and come back to attack me again. Now I understood that he wanted to get even for the death of his leader, but then I didn’t want to think about that so silently waited for the end to come. The second time, I thought, he won’t miss. I looked down. The cloud was now much closer – perhaps 50-100 meters away. I thought: ‘What will happen first – will I go into the cloud or will his tracers hit me? If the Sabre opens fire, he won’t miss.’ But when the Sabre closed to 800 meters and new tracers flew from it, I poked into the cloud. It immediately became quite dark, humid, but it was a beautiful sensation that I was safe, as he could not see me and I did not see the approaching Sabre and his tracers."

Kramarenko landed safely, was found by a North Korean villager who took care of him until he was recovered by a search party and returned to Antung. The Sabre attacked by Kramarenko was the F-86E BuNo 50-636 of Major George V. Wendling (16th FIS), which received "major damage" on that day. Almost certainly the pilot who shot down and shot at the Soviet ace was Major William F. Shaeffer, of the 16th FIS, 51st FIW.

Following the decision of General Staff of USSR's Armed Forces, the VVS 303rd and 324th Fighter Aviation Division were replaced by PVO divisions, the 97th and 190th Fighter Aviation Division. So, on 31 January 324th, Fighter Aviation Division ceased combat operations in Korea and 176th Guards Fighter Aviation Regiment (and Kramarenko with it) returned to the Soviet Union.

== Credited victories ==
On the Eastern Front (World War II) Sergei Kramarenko scored two individual victories and 10 more group (shared) kills, plus a balloon. During the Korean War he flew 104 combat sorties, engaged UN aircraft on 42 occasions, and was officially credited with 13 victories. After cross-referencing his credited victories with German and US losses, it seems that in fact he shot down one German warplane during World War II, and he scored at least eight or nine victories in Korea, besides seriously damaging three more UN jets.

Date (dd.mm.yyyy)	Unit	Aircraft flown	Enemy Aircraft	Pilot & Fate	Unit, AF
23 February 1943	523 Fighter Aviation Regiment	La-5 "Red 34"	Fw 190A-3 WkNr 2265	Karl Stadeck (KIA)	2./JG 51, Luftwaffe
16 April 1945	176 Guards Fighter Aviation Regiment	La-7 "Red 27"	Fw 190	--	Luftwaffe (**)
12 April 1951	176 Guards Fighter Aviation Regiment	MiG-15 "Red 729"	F-80C BuNo ?	A. B. Swanson (*)	18 ABG, USAF
2 June 1951	176 Guards Fighter Aviation Regiment	MiG-15bis "Red 721"	F-86A BuNo 49-1130	Thomas C. Hanson (KIA) (*)	336 FIS, USAF
17 June 1951	176 Guards Fighter Aviation Regiment	MiG-15bis "Red 721"	F-86A BuNo 49-1281	Glenn T. Eagleston	4 FIW, USAF
23 June 1951	176 Guards Fighter Aviation Regiment	MiG-15bis "Red 721"	F-86	-- {***}	USAF (**)
11 July 1951	176 Guards Fighter Aviation Regiment	MiG-15bis "Red 721"	F-86A BuNo 48-297	Conrad Allard (KIA) (*)	335 FIS, USAF
29 July 1951	176 Guards Fighter Aviation Regiment	MiG-15bis "Red 721"	F-86A BuNo 49-1098	? {Pilot bailed out 6 miles (9.7 km) NE of Suwon}	4 FIW, USAF
12 September 1951	176 Guards Fighter Aviation Regiment	MiG-15bis "Red 721"	F-84E BuNo 49-2399	Capt. Chapman {bailed out near Cho-do rescued}	136 FBW, USAF
22 September 1951	176 Guards Fighter Aviation Regiment	MiG-15bis "Red 721"	F-86A BuNo 49-1158 (dam)	? {KORWALD reports damaged 23 September 1951}	4 FIW, USAF
30 October 1951	176 Guards Fighter Aviation Regiment	MiG-15bis "Red 721"	F-84E BuNo 51-615	? {Plane heavily damaged by MiG Sunan area-crash landed}	49 FBW, USAF
1 December 1951	176 Guards Fighter Aviation Regiment	MiG-15bis "Red 684"	Meteor F.8 S/N A77-559 (dam) ****	W/O Bill Middlemiss (forced to return to Kimpo, but landed)	No.77 Sqn, RAAF
1 December 1951	176 Guards Fighter Aviation Regiment	MiG-15bis "Red 684"	Meteor F.8 S/N A77-251 ****	P/O Vance Drummond (ejected; POW)	No.77 Sqn, RAAF
12 January 1952	176 Guards Fighter Aviation Regiment	MiG-15bis "Red 684"	F-86E BuNo 50-615	Paul G. Ridgeway (*)	334 FIS, USAF
12 January 1952	176 Guards Fighter Aviation Regiment	MiG-15bis "Red 684"	F-86	--	USAF (**)
16 January 1952	176 Guards Fighter Aviation Regiment	MiG-15bis "Red 684"	F-86 BuNo ? {F-80C BuNo 49-1880}	? - pilot MIA {Possibly 1st Lt R.L. McNulty - MIA}	80 Ftr-Bdmr USAF
17 January 1952	176 Guards Fighter Aviation Regiment	MiG-15bis "Red 684"	F-86E BuNo 50-636 (dam)	George V. Wendling	16 FIS, USAF

(*) = Loss not credited in US records to MiG-15 action. KORWALD lists Captain A.B. Swanson loss date as 13.04.1951 and that he was hit by AAA, bailed out successfully and was rescued. Ditto lists Lt Thomas C. Hanson loss date 05.06.1951 crashed on take off 5 miles (8.0 km) off end of runway Suwon K-13 after jettisoning fuel tanks; Ditto lists Captain Ridgeway as being lost 13.01.1952. Cause of loss is given as "Engine explosion, crashed" and "Explosion in engine section"; {Pilot} successfully ejected 6 mi (9.7 km) N of K-14, rescued.

(**) = Overclaim in good faith.

(***)= KORWALD reports only one F-86 lost between dates of 21 June 1951 and 24.06.1951-on 22 June 1951 F-86A 49-1276 of 4th Ftr-Int Gp/336th Ftr-Int Sq was shot down by MIG at 645L. Pilot 1Lt Howard P. Miller remains recovered in "Operation Glory" Likewise KORWALD reports that on 24 June 1951 a F-80C of 49th Ftr-Bmdr Gr/8th Ftr-Bmdr Sq-a Flight of 4 F-80s attacked by 12 MiG-15s, downed by MiG over Chonsodae (Sonchon); 1Lt Ernest C Dunning Jr captured and returned during Operation Big Switch.

(****)= Possible overclaim in good faith. Pilots from 176 Guards Fighter Aviation Regiment claimed nine Meteors destroyed on 1 December 1950, although only three were actually lost by 77 Sqn RAAF.

== Postwar ==
After his return to the Soviet Union, he studied at the Air Force Academy, where he graduated in 1954. Around that same time, in Moscow, he met an art student - Yulya Alekseyevna. Soon they began dating and going together to the Bolshoi Theater and others. In 1956 he got his first command duty as deputy commander of a regiment placed in Machulishchi, Belarus. In 1957 he proposed marriage to Yulya, and she accepted. Already married, that same year Kramarenko received his second command assignment - the 167th Fighter Aviation Regiment in Georgia. Soon other commissions followed all over the Soviet Union, and he was also blessed by the births of his son Aleksandr and his daughter Nadezhda.

In 1970 he received a new appointment, this time on foreign soil: the Iraqi Air Force had bought brand new MiG-21s, and Kramarenko helped Iraqi pilots and officers learn to operate the Soviet aircraft and trained them in tactics. A similar duty followed in Algeria in the mid-1970s. Finally, already a Major-General of the Air Force, Kramarenko retired in 1977.

In 1981, Kramarenko became the vice-president of the Rossiskaya Assotsiatsya Geroev (Russian Association of Heroes, the War Veteran Association, named that way because many of its members are Heroes of the Soviet Union). He published his autobiography, titled "Против «мессеров» и «сейбров»", or "Against the Messers and Sabres" in 2006. It was translated into English in 2008 as "The Red Air Force at War: Air Combat Over the Eastern Front & Korea" . His wife Yulia died in 2019. Sergei Kramarenko lived his last years in his flat in Moscow. He died on May 21, 2020, at the age of 97, due to illness. He was buried next to his wife at Troyekurovskoye Cemetery in Moscow.

== Awards ==
USSR and Russia

- Hero of the Soviet Union (10 October 1951)
- Order of Lenin (10 October 1951)
- Order of the Red Banner, twice (15 April 1945 and 2 June 1951)
- Order of the Red Star (30 December 1956)
- Order of the Patriotic War 1st class (11 March 1985)
- Order "For Service to the Homeland in the Armed Forces of the USSR" 3rd class (21 February 1978)
- Medal "For Battle Merit" (17 May 1951)
- Medal of Zhukov (1994)
- Medal "For the Liberation of Warsaw" (1945)
- Medal "For the Capture of Berlin" (1945)
- Medal "For the Victory over Germany in the Great Patriotic War 1941–1945" (1945)
- Jubilee Medal "Twenty Years of Victory in the Great Patriotic War 1941–1945" (1965)
- Jubilee Medal "Thirty Years of Victory in the Great Patriotic War 1941–1945" (1975)
- Jubilee Medal "Forty Years of Victory in the Great Patriotic War 1941–1945" (1985)
- Jubilee Medal "50 Years of Victory in the Great Patriotic War 1941–1945" (1995)
- Jubilee Medal "60 Years of Victory in the Great Patriotic War 1941–1945" (2004)
- Jubilee Medal "65 Years of Victory in the Great Patriotic War 1941–1945" (2009)
- Jubilee Medal "70 Years of Victory in the Great Patriotic War 1941–1945" (2013)
- Jubilee Medal "75 Years of Victory in the Great Patriotic War 1941–1945" (2019)
- Jubilee Medal "In Commemoration of the 100th Anniversary since the Birth of Vladimir Il'ich Lenin" (1969)
- Jubilee Medal "30 Years of the Soviet Army and Navy" (1948)
- Jubilee Medal "40 Years of the Armed Forces of the USSR" (1957)
- Jubilee Medal "50 Years of the Armed Forces of the USSR" (1967)
- Jubilee Medal "60 Years of the Armed Forces of the USSR" (1978)
- Jubilee Medal "70 Years of the Armed Forces of the USSR" (1988)
- Medal "Veteran of the Armed Forces of the USSR" (1976)
- Medal "In Commemoration of the 850th Anniversary of Moscow" (1997)
- Medal "For Impeccable Service", First class
- Medal "For Service in the Air Force" (2004)

Foreign

- Medal of Sino-Soviet Friendship (China)
- Order "60 Years of Victory in the Patriotic War of Independence" (North Korea)
- Jubilee Medal "60 Years of Liberation of Ukraine from Fascist Invaders" (Ukraine)
- Jubilee Medal "20 Years of Independence of Ukraine" (Ukraine)

== Bibliography ==
- Kramarenko, Sergey (2006). Против "мессеров" и "сейбров". В небе двух войн. Moscow: Yauza. ISBN 5699171231. OCLC 162473246.
- Kramarenko, Sergey (2008). Air combat over the Eastern Front and Korea : a Soviet fighter pilot remembers. Barnsley: Pen & Sword Military. ISBN 9781844157358. OCLC 229464295.
- Thompson, Warren; McLaren, David (2002). MiG Alley: Sabres Vs. MIGs Over Korea, Pilot Accounts and the Complete Combat Record of the F-86 Sabre. North Branch, Minnesota: Specialty Press. ISBN 1580070582. OCLC 49226012.
- Seidov, Igor (2016). Советские асы корейской войны. Moscow: Фонд содействия авиации «Русские витязи». ISBN 9785903389353. OCLC 970400945.
