= Pepelyaev =

Pepelyaev (masculine, Russian: Пепеляев) or Pepelyaeva (feminine, Russian: Пепеляева), sometimes transliterated as Pepelyayev, is a Russian surname. Notable people with the surname include:

- Alexei Pepelyayev (born 1984), Russian ice hockey player
- Anatoly Pepelyayev (1891–1938), Russian general
- Viktor Pepelyayev (1885–1920), Russian politician
- Yevgeny Pepelyaev (1918–2013), Soviet Air Force officer and Korean War flying ace
