= Grigory Ges =

Soviet Korean War flying ace (1916–1968)

Grigory Ivanovich Ges
- Григорий Иванович Гесь
- Ges, c. 1954-1957
- Born: 25 March 1916; Vasylivka, Yekaterinoslav Governorate, Russian Empire (now part of Dnipropetrovsk Oblast, Ukraine)
- Died: 7 January 1968 (aged 51); Elektrostal, USSR
- Military career
- Allegiance: Soviet Union
- Branch: Soviet Air Force
- Service years: 1937–1957
- Rank: Major
- Unit: 176th Guards Fighter Aviation Regiment
- Conflicts: World War II; Korean War
- Awards: Hero of the Soviet Union

Grigory Ivanovich Ges (Russian: Григорий Иванович Гесь; 25 March 1916 – 7 January 1968) was a Soviet Air Force officer who became a flying ace during the Korean War.

Ges began his military career as a mechanic just before World War II but soon became a pilot after graduating from flight school. He served as an instructor pilot during World War II, being decorated for his training efforts, and had a nearly two-month combat tour in late 1944. Continuing his service postwar, Ges became a deputy squadron commander in the 176th Guards Fighter Aviation Regiment, with which he fought in the Korean War, flying the MiG-15. Credited with eight victories, he was made a Hero of the Soviet Union for his actions in late 1951.

== Early life and World War II ==
Ges was born to working class Ukrainian parents on 7 April 1916 in the village of Vasylivka, Yekaterinoslav Governorate. After graduating from middle school in 1930, he worked as manager of the club and as a ledger clerk in the village. He went to Artemovsk in 1936 to become a station chief and in September 1937 was drafted into the Red Army, graduating from the Chita School for Junior Aviation Specialists in 1938. Between 1938 and 1940 he served as a mechanic at the Bataysk Military Aviation School of Pilots, and graduated from the school in 1941, becoming an instructor pilot there.

During World War II, Ges served as an instructor pilot with the 4th Reserve Fighter Aviation Regiment (stationed in the Volga Military District and later the Kharkov Military District) from 1943, training pilots on the Yak-7 and La-5 fighters. Between 6 September 1943 and 1 March 1944 Ges trained a full course of nine fighter pilots and between 14 March and 15 April he retrained 36 pilots of the 56th Fighter Aviation Regiment for the 1st section of combat fighter aviation course without accidents. He was sent to an operational unit for combat experience between 4 November and 26 December 1944, serving as a flight commander with the 178th Guards Fighter Aviation Regiment on the 2nd Ukrainian Front. In the skies over Hungary, Ges flew 21 La-5 combat sorties, participated in five air battles, and claimed two shared aerial victories. He was awarded the Order of the Red Star on 23 February 1945 for his training efforts.

== Postwar and Korean War ==
After the end of the war, in March 1946, Ges was transferred to the 176th Guards Fighter Aviation Regiment in the Moscow Military District. He became a flight commander in April 1947 and in August 1950 was promoted to the rank of military pilot 2nd class. In October of the same year he became a military pilot 1st class with the rank of senior lieutenant. He became deputy commander of a squadron for pilots in November 1950.

With the 176th Guards Regiment, Ges was sent to fight with the 64th Fighter Aviation Corps in December 1950, participating in the Korean War. He served as a deputy squadron commander and later squadron commander, being awarded the Order of Lenin on 2 June 1951. Between April 1951 and February 1952 Ges flew about 120 sorties and was credited with eight aerial victories. Ges became a flying ace on 20 June 1951 when he shot down an F-51 Mustang from the 35th Fighter Group. As the Mustang disintegrated under his fire, the stabilizer of Ges' MiG-15 was destroyed when the port wing of the Mustang hit his tail. Ges was able to bank the aircraft over and evade a subsequent attack by four F-86 Sabres that damaged his wingman's aircraft. He was able to land safely at his airfield despite the damage. For his "courage and heroism," he was awarded the title Hero of the Soviet Union and a second Order of Lenin on 10 October 1951. Some sources claim Ges may have had up to 10 victories, though most sources agree on 8.

After the regiment was rotated out of combat and returned to the Soviet Union, Ges was sent to Higher Officers Flying and Tactical Courses in Taganrog in October 1953. After completing them a month later, he was sent to the 196th Fighter Aviation Regiment PVO of the 52nd Fighter Air Defense Army to serve as a deputy squadron commander. In November 1954 he became assistant commander for gunnery and tactical training of the regiment before being transferred to the reserve with the rank of major in May 1957. During his career, Ges flew the U-2, UT-2, I-16, Yak-7, Yak-15, LaGG-3, La-5, La-7, La-9, MiG-15, and MiG-17. As a civilian, he lived in Elektrostal until his death on 7 January 1968.

== Awards and decorations ==
- Hero of the Soviet Union (10 October 1951)
- Order of Lenin (2 June and 10 October 1951)
- Order of the Red Star (23 February 1945, 29 April 1954, 26 October 1955)
- Medal "For Battle Merit" (6 November 1947)
- campaign and jubilee medals

== See also ==
- List of Korean War flying aces

== Sources ==
- Krylov, Leonid; Tepsurkaev, Yuriy (2008), Soviet MiG-15 Aces of the Korean War, Oxford, United Kingdom: Osprey Publishing, ISBN 978-1-84603-299-8
- Werrell, Kenneth P. (2005), Sabres Over MiG Alley: The F-86 and the Battle for Air Superiority in Korea, Annapolis, Maryland: Naval Institute Press, ISBN 978-1-59114-933-0
- Seidov, Igor (2016). Советские асы корейской войны [Soviet Aces of the Korean War]. Moscow: Фонд содействия авиации «Русские витязи». ISBN 9785990771468. OCLC 979539338.
