= Yevgeny Pepelyaev =

Soviet fighter pilot (1918–2013)

- Евгений Георгиевич Пепеляев
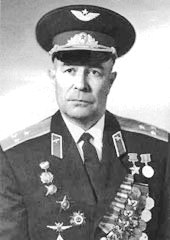
- Born: 18 March 1918; Bodaybo, Irkutsk, Soviet Union
- Died: 4 January 2013 (aged 94); Moscow, Russia
- Military career
- Allegiance: Soviet Union
- Branch: Soviet Air Force
- Rank: Colonel
- Units: 300th Fighter Aviation Regiment; 330th Fighter Aviation Regiment; 196th Guards Fighter Aviation Regiment
- Commands: 196th Guards Fighter Aviation Regiment
- Conflicts: World War II; Korean War
- Awards: Hero of the Soviet Union

Yevgeny Georgievich Pepelyaev (Russian: Евгений Георгиевич Пепеляев; 18 March 1918 – 4 January 2013) was a Soviet fighter pilot in the Korean War; most Russian sources credit him as the second-highest scoring pilot in the war with 19 shootdowns, placing him only below Nikolai Sutyagin. However, some Western sources indicate him to be the top ace of the war, and he claimed to have 23 victories in his memoir, which would put him above Sutyagin's 22 shootdowns.

== Early career and World War II ==
Pepelyaev was born on 18 March 1918 in Bodaybo, Irkutsk, in Eastern Siberia, the son of a railroad worker. His elder brother Konstantin enlisted in the Soviet air force, and thus with the intention to follow the steps of his brother he worked in Odessa with the city aeroclubs. He graduated in 1938 from the 8th Military Pilots School and was sent to serve in a regiment deployed in the Far East.

With the German invasion of the USSR in June 1941, he was retained in the Far East despite several requests for a combat posting in the west, especially after his brother Konstantin was killed in action. In late 1943 he was still an instructor with the 162nd Fighter Aviation Regiment. He flew at least 10 sorties on the Eastern Front, (some source indicate 12 sorties) flying the Yak-7B, but did not shoot down any German aircraft. In 1945 he was made deputy commander of the 300th Fighter Aviation Regiment, and participated in the Soviet invasion of Manchuria, during which he flew four (by other accounts 30) ground-attack missions on the Yak-9T.

The 300th Fighter Aviation Regiment was then assigned surveillance duties covering the deployment of the US troops in Korea until March 1946, when the unit was sent back to the Soviet Union. In December 1947 he became the executive officer of the 196th Fighter Aviation Regiment. In 1949 the unit began receiving the MiG-15 jet fighter.

== Korean War ==
The Korean War began in June 1950 when the Soviet and Chinese Communist backed North Korea invaded United States-backed South Korea. By October 1950 Pepelyaev commanded the 196th Fighter Aviation Regiment. Secretly the USSR sent several air regiments equipped with the MiG-15 to the Chinese base Antung in Manchuria to support Chinese ground forces. In December 1950 the 64th Fighter Aviation Corps with two fighter divisions was created; Pepelyaev's unit, 196th Fighter Aviation Regiment, was soon put in the 324th Fighter Aviation Division (commanded by Ivan Kozhedub).

The 196th Fighter Aviation Regiment arrived in Manchuria in January 1951, and re-deployed to Antung. On 20 May 1951 a force of 36 MiGs clashed with 28 F-86 Sabres, and both sides overclaimed, with the USAF claiming three MiGs and the Soviets claiming four F-86s. In fact one MiG was lost outright and three Sabres were damaged. Captain James Jabara shot down one of Pepelyaev's pilots, Captain Viktor Nazarkin, and Pepelyaev claimed one F-86; the burst fired by Pepelyaev hit the right wing of F-86A 49-1080 flown by 1st Lieutenant Milton Nelson of the 335th Fighter Interceptor Squadron, destroying hydraulic lines. Nelson managed to bring the crippled Sabre back to Kimpo Air Base, where it was written off.

On July 11 26 MiG-15s of the 196th Fighter Aviation Regiment led by Pepelyaev again engaged Sabres, and one F-86A involved, 49-1297 (336th Fighter Squadron) made a forced landing at Suwon Air Base. The pilot was not injured, however the F-86A was damaged beyond repair. Official USAF records indicate the loss as a “landing accident”. On July 21 the 196th Fighter Aviation Regiment intercepted a formation of "F-94s", actually USMC F9F-2Bs of VMF-311. Pepelyaev claimed two of the enemy aircraft and his unit claimed five more, VMF-311 denied suffering any fatalities on this date.

On 6 October 1951 Pepelyaev clashed with Sabres of 4th Fighter Interceptor Wing at 8 km (26,000 ft; 5.0 mi), downing 2 F-86s. The F-86A 49-1319 of Captain Bill Garrett (334th Fighter Squadron), ditched in Sokhoson Bay, while another F-86A, 49-1267 (334th Fighter Squadron) is attributed in some western sources as being lost due to an accident. On 16 October he and his wingman Aleksandr Ryzhkov caught a pair of Sabres of the 336th Fighter Squadron; Pepelyaev shot down one of them, 49-1147, though some sources say the plane was lost due to running out of fuel. The pilot, David B. Freeland ejected and survived.

On 8 November 1951 two more American aircraft were claimed; over Pkhenvon he spotted four F-86s, and opened fire at 150–200 m (490–660 ft), downing F-86A 49-1338 flown by Charles W. Pratt (334th Fighter Squadron), who perished. A few hours later Pepelyaev intercepted a RF-80A of the 15th Reconnaissance Squadron and shot it down. In late November Pepelyaev shot down four more American aircraft over the course of three days; on 27 November he downed an F-84E of the 7th Fighter Squadron, 49th Fighter Bomber Wing, piloted by Bernard Karl Seitzinger, who was killed in action. The next day he shot down two F-86s; F-86A 49-1184 and F-86E 50-673; causing Dayton Ragland to become a prisoner of war. Pepelyaev scored another shootdown on 29 November 1951, a F-86A 48-301 of the 334th Fighter Squadron over Syukusen. The Sabre managed to limp back to Kimpo, but the aircraft never flew again and was written off on 9 December.

On 1 December 1951 Pepelyaev forced Lieutenant Thomas T. Mounts to eject from F-80C 49-855, while on 7 January 1952 Pepelyaev led 18 MiG-15s to engage a group of Sabres of the 51st FIW, and Pepelyaev downed F-86E 50-651. Charles E. Stahl ejected and was captured. He claimed another F-86 the next day, but his victim (F-86E 50-679) was repaired and returned to combat. On 11 January 1952 he scored his last shootdown, F-86 50-612 of the 25th Fighter Squadron.

== Post war ==
When he returned to the Soviet Union, Pepelyayev was promoted to deputy commander of the 15th Fighter Aviation Division in November 1952, and was stationed in Oryol. In early 1953, he took charge of the training of pilots that would be sent to fly combat missions in Korea. From 1954, he worked as test pilot.

In 1958, Pepelyaev graduated from the Military Academy of the General Staff and was appointed commander of the 133rd Fighter Aviation Division in Yaroslavl. Since the fall of 1960, he was assigned as the Chief of Aviation of the 78th Air Defense Fighter Aviation Corps in Bryansk. In 1961, during a routine flight, he performed a tight aerial maneuverer and suffered a brain haemorrhage. Despite receiving immediate medical attention and recovery, he was decommissioned from flight service and was assigned to the central command post of the Soviet Air Defence Forces. He was demobilized from military in 1973.

After demobilization, Pepelyaev lived in Moscow where he worked as a main engineer at the Scientist Research Automatic Instruments Institute until retirement in 1986. In July 1993, he returned to North Korea together with Soviet flying aces Sergey Kramarenko and Dmitry Oskin, during the commemoration of the 40th anniversary of the end of Korean War.

In 1995, he was invited to visit Maxwell Air Force Base in Alabama where he was inducted into the Gathering of Eagles Program. During his visit, he met with American Korean War flying aces Gabby Gabreski, John F. Bolt and Robinson Risner, and German World War II flying ace Alfred Grislawski.

Pepelayev died on 4 January 2013, at the age of 94. He was buried at the Nikolo-Arkhangelskoye Cemetery in Moscow. In February 2022, a commemorative plaque honoring him was unveiled at his former residence in Novogireyevo District in Moscow.

== Final tally ==
Breakdowns of Pepelyaev's victories vary; most Russian historians credit him with 19 victories, including Igor Seidov and Mikhail Bykov who credit him with one F-80, two F-94, two F-84, and 14 F-86 over the course of 109 sorties that included 38 dogfights.

== Awards ==
USSR and Russia

- Hero of the Soviet Union (22 April 1952)
- Order of Lenin, twice (10 October 1951, 22 April 1952)
- Order of the Red Banner, thrice (25 July 1949, 2 June 1951, 30 December 1956)
- Order of the Patriotic War, 1st class (11 March 1985)
- Order of the Patriotic War, 2nd class (29 September 1945)
- Order of the Red Star, twice (1951,?)
- Medal "For Battle Merit" (1946)
- Medal of Zhukov
- Medal "For the Victory over Germany in the Great Patriotic War 1941–1945" (1945)
- Medal "For the Victory over Japan" (1945)
- jubilee medals

Foreign

- Medal of Sino-Soviet Friendship (China)
