= Nikolai Sutyagin =

Soviet flying ace (1923–1986)

- Николай Васильевич Сутягин
- Born: 5 May 1923; Smagino, Buturlinsky District, Nizhny Novgorod, Russian SFSR, USSR
- Died: 12 November 1986 (aged 63); Kiev, Ukraine SSR, Soviet Union
- Military career
- Allegiance: Soviet Union
- Branch: Soviet Air Force
- Service years: 1941–1978
- Rank: Major General
- Unit: 17th Fighter Aviation Regiment
- Conflicts: World War II; Korean War
- Awards: Hero of the Soviet Union

Nikolai Vasilyevich Sutyagin (Russian: Николай Васильевич Сутягин; 5 May 1923 – 12 November 1986) was a Soviet fighter pilot in the Second World War and the Korean War. He is considered by most Russian sources to be the top ace of the Korean War, with 22 victories. His 22 victories would also make him the highest scoring jet ace.

== Biography ==
Sutyagin was born in 1923 near Nizhniy Novgorod, then known as Gorkiy. His parents were actors, and eventually moved to the city when Nikolai was 11. Joining the Komsomol in 1939, Nikolai was then able to get into the DOSAAF program where he was exposed to flying in the Polikarpov Po-2 biplane. In March 1941 he was conscripted into the Red Army, but was then posted to the Soviet Air Force.

He then went to pilot school, graduating in 1942, and was sent to the 5th Fighter Aviation Regiment in the Far East. He remained in the Far East until the end of the war, acquiring some combat experience in the war with Japan after the Soviets declared war on the Japanese Empire. After the war, Sutyagin learned to fly the American P-63 Kingcobra, also flying as an instructor in the Soviet-converted UTI P-63 two-seater.

In April 1947 Sutyagin joined the 17th Fighter Aviation Regiment, part of the 190th Fighter Aviation Division (IAD) in the Far East Military District. In 1950 the 17th was moved to the new 303rd IAD, which included the 523rd Fighter Aviation Regiment and 18th Guards Fighter Aviation Regiment, and the entire division was equipped with the new MiG-15 jet fighter. Sutyagin completed 54 flights in the MiG-15 before the division was ordered on a "secret tour" and reassigned to the 64th Fighter Aviation Corps at Mukden in Manchuria, with its regiments forward deployed to Myaogao and Antung airfields on the Korean border, in order to counter UN airpower over Korea.

Sutyagin began combat operations in April 1951. When he left Korea in February 1952, Captain Sutyagin had been credited with shooting down 22 UN aircraft. He was the highest scoring ace in the Korean war, outscoring the top U.S ace Captain Joseph C. McConnell by 6 kills.

Sutyagin was awarded the Gold Star and the title Hero of the Soviet Union, and was soon promoted to Major. By 1970 he was a chief instructor and Major-General of Aviation (the equivalent of US rank of Brigadier general).

Sutyagin served a further combat tour as chief instructor for flight training to the Vietnamese People's Air Force and taught combat tactics in 1970–1971, flying the MiG-21PF and MiG-17. Suffering ill health, he returned to the USSR in May 1972 and was sent to GSFG in East Germany to recuperate. Due to his failing vision Sutyagin was removed from flight status and relegated to either trainers or transports.

Sutyagin retired in May 1978 at the age of 55, and spent the last years of his life with his family, dying in November 1986 at the age of 63. Over the course of his career he flew 20 types of aircraft and logged over 3,300 flight hours.

He claimed 15 F-86 Sabres, three F-84 Thunderjets, two P-80 Shooting Stars and two Gloster Meteors shot down. Sutyagin's Korean War record was 149 combat missions, 66 aerial engagements and 22 enemy aircraft shot down.

== Awards ==
- Hero of the Soviet Union (10 October 1951)
- Honoured Military Pilot of the USSR (17 August 1971)
- Order of Lenin (10 October 1951)
- Order of the Patriotic War 1st class (11 March 1985)
- Three Order of the Red Star (26 August 1945, 30 December 1956, and 4 May 1972)
- Order "For Service to the Homeland in the Armed Forces of the USSR" 3rd class (22 February 1977)
- Medal "For Military Merit" (17 May 1950)

== Victory claims ==
Russian pilots were under strict ground-controlled interception control at all times, and were expressly forbidden from leaving the North Korean airspace, and flying over either ocean area, or the UN controlled South Korean airspace, lest a downed aircraft with a Russian speaking pilot be captured and the subsequent involvement of the Soviet combat forces in the war exposed. Therefore, all air combat occurred over friendly territory. As a result of the requirements to physically confirm victories thru collection of pieces of the actual wreckage, Soviet ground units were created and issued trucks and radio operators, for liaison with North Korean ground forces, whose specific function was to seek out and locate the wreckage of UN aircraft that had been downed over the North Korean controlled lands.

Sutyagin's record is generally held to be 22 solo victories, with another two shared. However at least one source suggests that only five victories are verifiable.

== See also ==
- List of Korean War flying aces

== Bibliography ==
- Hobbes Nicholas Ph.D. "Essential Militia" Atlantic Books, 2003 ISBN 978-0-8021-1772-4
- Seidov, Igor (2016). Советские асы корейской войны. Moscow: Фонд содействия авиации «Русские витязи». ISBN 9785903389353. OCLC 970400945.
- Sutiagin, Yuri; Seidov, Igor (2009). MiG Menace Over Korea: The Story of Soviet Fighter Ace Nikolai Sutiagin. Pen and Sword. ISBN 978-184884038-6.
