= Alexei Pepelyayev =

Russian ice hockey player

- Born: 16 June 1984 (age 40); Barnaul, Russia
- Height: 6 ft 0 in (183 cm)
- Weight: 205 lb (93 kg; 14 st 9 lb)
- Position: Defence
- Shot: Left
- VHL team Former teams: Humo Tashkent; Metallurg Novokuznetsk; Krylia Sovetov; Lada Togliatti; HC Yugra; Torpedo Nizhny Novgorod; HC Sochi; Spartak Moscow; Dynamo Moscow
- Playing career: 2001–2020

Alexei Pepelyayev (born 16 June 1984) is a Russian professional ice hockey defenceman. He is currently playing with Humo Tashkent of the Supreme Hockey League (VHL).

Pepelyayev made his Kontinental Hockey League debut playing with Khanty-Mansiysk Yugra during the 2010–11 KHL season.

== Career statistics ==
| | | | Regular season | | | | | Playoffs |
| Season | Team | League | GP | G | A | Pts | PIM | GP | G | A | Pts | PIM |
|---|---|---|---|---|---|---|---|---|---|---|---|---|
| 1999–00 | Metallurg Novokuznetsk-2 | Russia3 | 2 | 0 | 0 | 0 | 0 | — | — | — | — | — |
| 2000–01 | Metallurg Novokuznetsk-2 | Russia3 | 28 | 3 | 4 | 7 | 20 | — | — | — | — | — |
| 2001–02 | Metallurg Novokuznetsk | Russia | 16 | 0 | 0 | 0 | 8 | — | — | — | — | — |
| 2001–02 | Metallurg Novokuznetsk-2 | Russia3 | 19 | 0 | 4 | 4 | 44 | — | — | — | — | — |
| 2002–03 | Metallurg Novokuznetsk | Russia | 33 | 0 | 0 | 0 | 14 | — | — | — | — | — |
| 2002–03 | Metallurg Novokuznetsk-2 | Russia3 | 13 | 3 | 4 | 7 | 6 | — | — | — | — | — |
| 2003–04 | Metallurg Novokuznetsk | Russia | 15 | 1 | 0 | 1 | 2 | — | — | — | — | — |
| 2003–04 | Metallurg Novokuznetsk-2 | Russia3 | 3 | 0 | 0 | 0 | 10 | — | — | — | — | — |
| 2004–05 | Motor Barnaul | Russia2 | 27 | 4 | 2 | 6 | 24 | — | — | — | — | — |
| 2004–05 | Motor Barnaul-2 | Russia3 | 2 | 0 | 0 | 0 | 0 | — | — | — | — | — |
| 2004–05 | Metallurg Novokuznetsk-2 | Russia3 | 23 | 4 | 11 | 15 | 22 | — | — | — | — | — |
| 2005–06 | Metallurg Novokuznetsk | Russia | 31 | 1 | 2 | 3 | 20 | — | — | — | — | — |
| 2005–06 | Metallurg Novokuznetsk-2 | Russia3 | 12 | 6 | 7 | 13 | 12 | — | — | — | — | — |
| 2006–07 | Metallurg Novokuznetsk | Russia | 7 | 0 | 0 | 0 | 12 | — | — | — | — | — |
| 2006–07 | Metallurg Novokuznetsk-2 | Russia3 | 9 | 0 | 1 | 1 | 10 | — | — | — | — | — |
| 2006–07 | Krylia Sovetov Moskva | Russia | 13 | 1 | 1 | 2 | 14 | — | — | — | — | — |
| 2007–08 | HC Lada Togliatti | Russia | 4 | 0 | 0 | 0 | 0 | — | — | — | — | — |
| 2007–08 | HC Lada Togliatti-2 | Russia3 | 16 | 4 | 7 | 11 | 12 | — | — | — | — | — |
| 2007–08 | Avtomobilist Yekaterinburg | Russia2 | 16 | 1 | 2 | 3 | 14 | — | — | — | — | — |
| 2007–08 | Avtomobilist Yekaterinburg-2 | Russia3 | 2 | 0 | 1 | 1 | 0 | — | — | — | — | — |
| 2007–08 | Mechel Chelyabinsk | Russia2 | 3 | 0 | 1 | 1 | 0 | — | — | — | — | — |
| 2008–09 | Yugra Khanty-Mansiysk | Russia2 | 43 | 1 | 9 | 10 | 44 | 16 | 2 | 6 | 8 | 12 |
| 2008–09 | Yugra Khanty-Mansiysk-M. | Russia3 | 3 | 0 | 0 | 0 | 0 | — | — | — | — | — |
| 2009–10 | Yugra Khanty-Mansiysk | Russia2 | 42 | 10 | 7 | 17 | 40 | 17 | 3 | 1 | 4 | 10 |
| 2010–11 | Yugra Khanty-Mansiysk | KHL | 53 | 9 | 7 | 16 | 80 | 6 | 3 | 2 | 5 | 10 |
| 2011–12 | Yugra Khanty-Mansiysk | KHL | 48 | 4 | 16 | 20 | 50 | 5 | 0 | 1 | 1 | 4 |
| 2012–13 | Yugra Khanty-Mansiysk | KHL | 52 | 5 | 11 | 16 | 42 | — | — | — | — | — |
| 2013–14 | Yugra Khanty-Mansiysk | KHL | 27 | 2 | 6 | 8 | 26 | — | — | — | — | — |
| 2014–15 | Yugra Khanty-Mansiysk | KHL | 35 | 3 | 7 | 10 | 44 | — | — | — | — | — |
| 2014–15 | Torpedo Nizhny Novgorod | KHL | 17 | 1 | 6 | 7 | 10 | 5 | 0 | 2 | 2 | 0 |
| 2015–16 | Torpedo Nizhny Novogorod | KHL | 28 | 3 | 7 | 10 | 28 | 11 | 0 | 3 | 3 | 33 |
| 2015–16 | HC Sarov | VHL | 1 | 0 | 0 | 0 | 0 | — | — | — | — | — |
| 2016–17 | Torpedo Nizhny Novgorod | KHL | 3 | 0 | 0 | 0 | 2 | — | — | — | — | — |
| 2016–17 | HC Sarov | VHL | 5 | 0 | 2 | 2 | 6 | — | — | — | — | — |
| 2016–17 | HC Sochi | KHL | 19 | 3 | 3 | 6 | 10 | — | — | — | — | — |
| 2017–18 | HC Spartak Moscow | KHL | 37 | 2 | 6 | 8 | 34 | 1 | 0 | 0 | 0 | 0 |
| 2018–19 | Buran Voronezh | VHL | 11 | 0 | 4 | 4 | 21 | — | — | — | — | — |
| 2018–19 | HC Dynamo Moscow | KHL | 39 | 1 | 1 | 2 | 18 | 7 | 0 | 0 | 0 | 8 |
| 2019–20 | Humo Tashkent | VHL | 43 | 1 | 3 | 4 | 23 | 11 | 0 | 2 | 2 | 8 |
| KHL totals | | | 358 | 33 | 70 | 103 | 344 | 35 | 3 | 8 | 11 | 55 |
| Russia totals | | | 119 | 3 | 3 | 6 | 70 | — | — | — | — | — |
| Russia2 totals | | | 131 | 16 | 21 | 37 | 122 | 33 | 5 | 7 | 12 | 22 |
