= Vance Drummond =

New Zealand-born Australian fighter pilot (1927–1967)

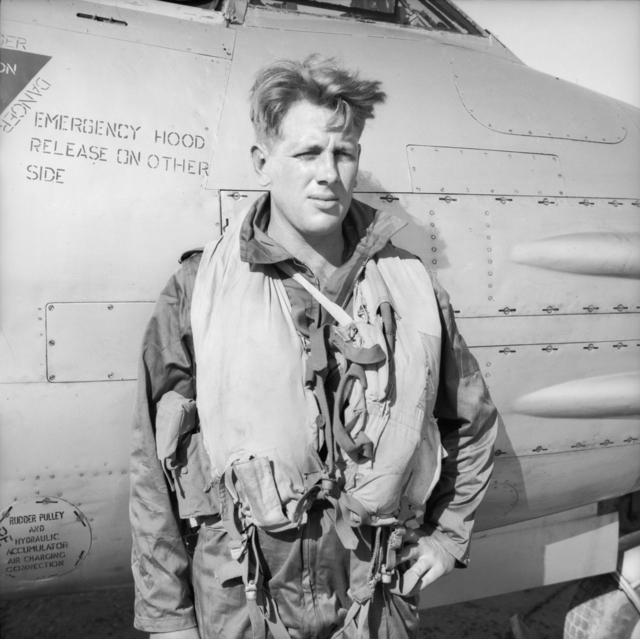
- Vance Drummond at Kimpo, South Korea, 1951
- Born: 22 February 1927; Hamilton, New Zealand
- Died: 17 May 1967 (aged 40); Near Williamtown, New South Wales, Australia
- Military career
- Allegiance: New Zealand (1944–48); Australia (1949–67)
- Branch: Royal New Zealand Air Force (1944–45); New Zealand Military Forces (1946–48); Royal Australian Air Force (1949–67)
- Service years: 1944–67
- Rank: Wing Commander
- Units: No. 77 Squadron (1951–53); No. 75 Squadron (1961–64); 19th Tactical Air Support Squadron USAF (1966)
- Commands: No. 3 Squadron (1967)
- Conflicts: Korean War; Vietnam War
- Awards: Distinguished Flying Cross; Air Force Cross; Air Medal (US); Cross of Gallantry with Silver Star (South Vietnam)

Vance Drummond, DFC, AFC (22 February 1927 – 17 May 1967) was a New Zealand–born Australian pilot who fought in the Korean and Vietnam Wars. He initially saw service in the New Zealand military, but joined the Royal Australian Air Force in 1949 and graduated as a sergeant pilot in 1951. Posted to No. 77 Squadron in Korea, he flew Gloster Meteor jet fighters and earned the US Air Medal for his combat skills. He was shot down by a Mikoyan-Gurevich MiG-15 in December 1951 and imprisoned for almost two years. After returning to Australia he converted to CAC Sabre jets and in December 1961 became a flight commander with No. 75 Squadron; he subsequently led the squadron's Black Diamonds aerobatic team, and was awarded the Air Force Cross in 1965.

Drummond was promoted to acting wing commander in December 1965 and posted to South Vietnam on staff duties with the United States Air Force. He joined the US Air Force's 19th Tactical Air Support Squadron, operating Cessna Bird Dog aircraft, as a forward air controller in July 1966. That month he earned the Distinguished Flying Cross for his part in rescuing a company of soldiers surrounded by Viet Cong forces. In October he was awarded the South Vietnamese Cross of Gallantry with Silver Star. Drummond took command of No. 3 Squadron, flying Dassault Mirage IIIO supersonic fighters out of Williamtown, New South Wales, in February 1967. His Mirage crashed into the sea during a training exercise on 17 May; neither Drummond nor the plane was found.

== Early life and New Zealand military service ==
The third child of Leonard Henry Vance Drummond and his wife Dorothy Josephine May, née McKnight, Vance Drummond was born on 22 February 1927 in Hamilton, New Zealand. He had three brothers and two sisters. His education, in Hamilton and Te Awamutu, was cut short so he could farm with his father. Drummond enlisted in the Royal New Zealand Air Force (RNZAF) in May 1944 and trained as a navigator; he graduated in September 1945 and was discharged with the rank of sergeant in October. He joined the New Zealand Military Forces in March 1946 and by July was serving with J Force, New Zealand's contribution to the British Commonwealth Occupation Force in Japan.

Returning to New Zealand in October 1948, Drummond tried to transfer to the RNZAF as a trainee pilot but was considered too old; he successfully applied to the Royal Australian Air Force (RAAF) and enlisted in August 1949. His brother Frederick Agnew Vance Drummond (1921–1941) had died on active service with the RAAF during World War II.

== RAAF flying training and Korean War ==
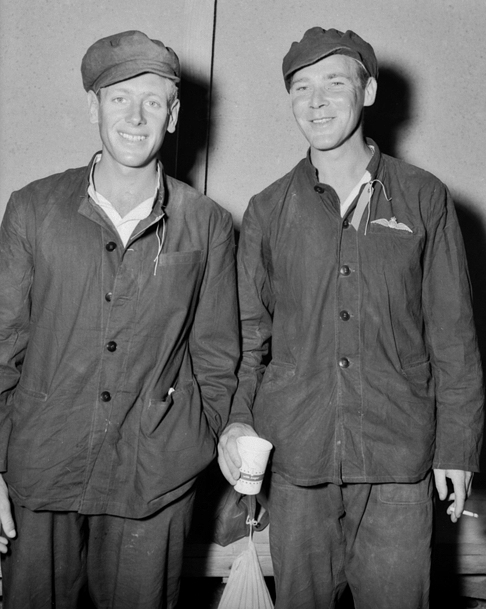
Drummond (left) and fellow pilot Bruce Thomson in the uniforms they wore during captivity in North Korea, September 1953

On 23 October 1950, while a student with No. 1 Flying Training School in Point Cook, Victoria, Drummond ditched his CAC Wirraway into Lake Corangamite during a low-level exercise. He was at an altitude of 200 feet (60 m) when he went to adjust his compass and accidentally knocked his control column forward, causing the Wirraway to dip and strike the water. Drummond remained with the floating plane for two hours before being rescued by boat. The RAAF investigation found that although Drummond was technically at fault, the "glassy" surface of the water and the awkward position of the compass in the Wirraway were the prime causes of his "aquatic adventure". He was considered an above-average student and was not disciplined for his lapse.

After graduating first in his class in February 1951, Drummond was posted to No. 78 (Fighter) Wing as a sergeant pilot. The wing operated North American P-51 Mustangs and De Havilland Vampires out of Williamtown, New South Wales. In August, Drummond was posted to No. 77 Squadron, based at Kimpo, South Korea. The squadron had gone into action a week after the outbreak of the Korean War in June 1950 and had recently converted from Mustangs to Gloster Meteor jet fighters. North Korea's Chinese allies operated a Russian-built swept-wing jet, the Mikoyan-Gurevich MiG-15, that outclassed all other fighters in the theatre except the new North American F-86 Sabre. The MiGs were often flown by seasoned Soviet air force pilots, whose deployment was unofficial, and denied at the time by the Soviet Union. In its first months operating the Meteor, No. 77 Squadron conducted offensive sweeps up the Yalu River with USAF Sabres, bomber escort missions, and combat air patrols.

Drummond was recommended for the US Air Medal for "courage, aggressiveness, tactical skill and devotion" in operations from 1 September to 28 October 1951. He was commissioned as a probationary pilot officer on 30 November. On 1 December, he was among a formation of twelve Meteors attacked by a superior force of Soviet-piloted MiGs; three Meteors, including Drummond's, were shot down. He ejected but was captured by the North Koreans and incarcerated in a prisoner-of-war camp. Drummond and four other prisoners broke out of the camp in April 1952 but were recaptured after two days. The North Koreans beat Drummond and another escapee, and put all five on trial; Drummond was sentenced to a month in confinement. He was promoted to flying officer on 30 November. An armistice ended the fighting on 27 July 1953, but prisoner exchange stretched over several weeks. Drummond was released on 1 September and repatriated to Australia shortly afterwards. His award of the US Air Medal was confirmed on 30 October 1953 and promulgated in the Commonwealth of Australia Gazette on 5 November.

== Sabre pilot ==
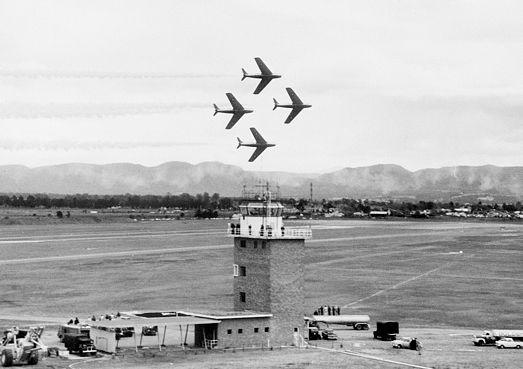
The RAAF's Black Diamonds aerobatic team

After returning to Australia, Drummond undertook No. 8 Advanced Navigation Course. In April 1954 he was one of six navigators who made a graduation flight from East Sale in Victoria—home of the RAAF School of Air Navigation—to New Zealand in Avro Lincoln bombers. He was then posted for flying duties with No. 2 Operational Training Unit (OTU) at Williamtown, where he completed No. 3 Fighter Combat Instructors Course. Drummond was a founding member of the Sabre Trials Flight, established in November 1954 as part of No. 2 OTU under Wing Commander Dick Cresswell, former commanding officer of No. 77 Squadron in Korea. The CAC Sabre was the RAAF's first swept-wing, transonic aircraft; belonging to the Trials Flight was, according to the official history of the post-war RAAF, "the Air Force's ultimate status symbol". Drummond was promoted to flight lieutenant on 30 May 1955. On 9 September, he married Margaret Buckham, a law clerk, in St Peter's Anglican Church, Newcastle; the couple had a son.

In February 1959, Drummond was assigned to Headquarters Operational Command, located in Glenbrook, New South Wales. From January to December 1961, he undertook No. 15 Course at the RAAF Staff College in Canberra. He then joined No. 75 Squadron as a flight commander and was raised to squadron leader on 1 January 1962. No. 75 Squadron operated Sabres and was home to the Black Diamonds aerobatic display team, which frequently appeared at events in Australia and its territories; Drummond was appointed leader of the team in October 1962. He also played a major role in squadron mobility exercises. Drummond was posted to the staff of the Department of Air in Canberra in December 1964. On 1 January 1965, he was awarded the Air Force Cross for his "loyalty and devotion to duty, plus a very high sense of responsibility" while serving with No. 75 Squadron.

== Vietnam War ==
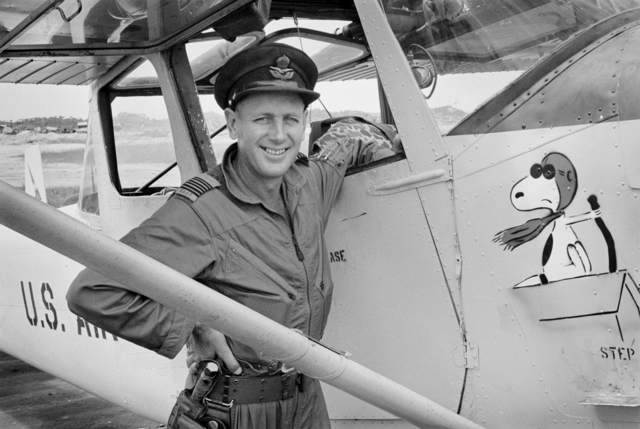
Drummond with "Snoopy", the USAF Cessna Bird Dog he flew as a forward air controller in Vietnam, August 1966

Drummond was promoted to acting wing commander on 16 December 1965 and posted to South Vietnam on the staff of the Second Air Division, United States Air Force (USAF). Based in Saigon, he was to observe US methods of air transport, reconnaissance, ground attack, and air defence. In July 1966—apparently at his own behest, according to the official history of the RAAF in the Vietnam War—he joined the 19th Tactical Air Support Squadron as a forward air controller (FAC); he flew in a two-seat Cessna Bird Dog aircraft called "Snoopy". Drummond was the first of several RAAF FACs attached to the USAF during the war. The FAC posting was highly prized by RAAF fighter pilots as they otherwise had little opportunity to serve in Vietnam. Their role was to fly low over enemy territory, spotting for ground-attack missions and checking the outcome. The nature of the work meant that, according to the official history of the post-war air force, "the FACs had probably the most hazardous job of any RAAF aircrew in the war".

On the evening of 24 July 1966, having already flown that day, Drummond and his US pilot were called out to assist a company of soldiers besieged by Viet Cong troops. Throughout the night and into the early hours of the next morning, in the face of heavy anti-aircraft fire, they marked enemy positions and directed air support until friendly troops arrived by helicopter to relieve the surrounded company. By the end of the mission, the Bird Dog crew had flown for eleven hours in several sorties. Drummond was recommended for the Distinguished Flying Cross (DFC) for his "outstanding courage and unselfish devotion to duty". On a mission in September, Drummond guided a US patrol into action with a Viet Cong force; the Americans captured the enemy's flag and subsequently gave it to Drummond, who sent it to Australia where his wife and a representative of the Chief of the Air Staff presented it to the Australian War Memorial, Canberra. Drummond was awarded the South Vietnamese Cross of Gallantry with Silver Star for a mission on 27 October. He finished his tour of duty with the USAF in Vietnam the following month, having flown 381 sorties.

== Fatal accident and court of inquiry ==
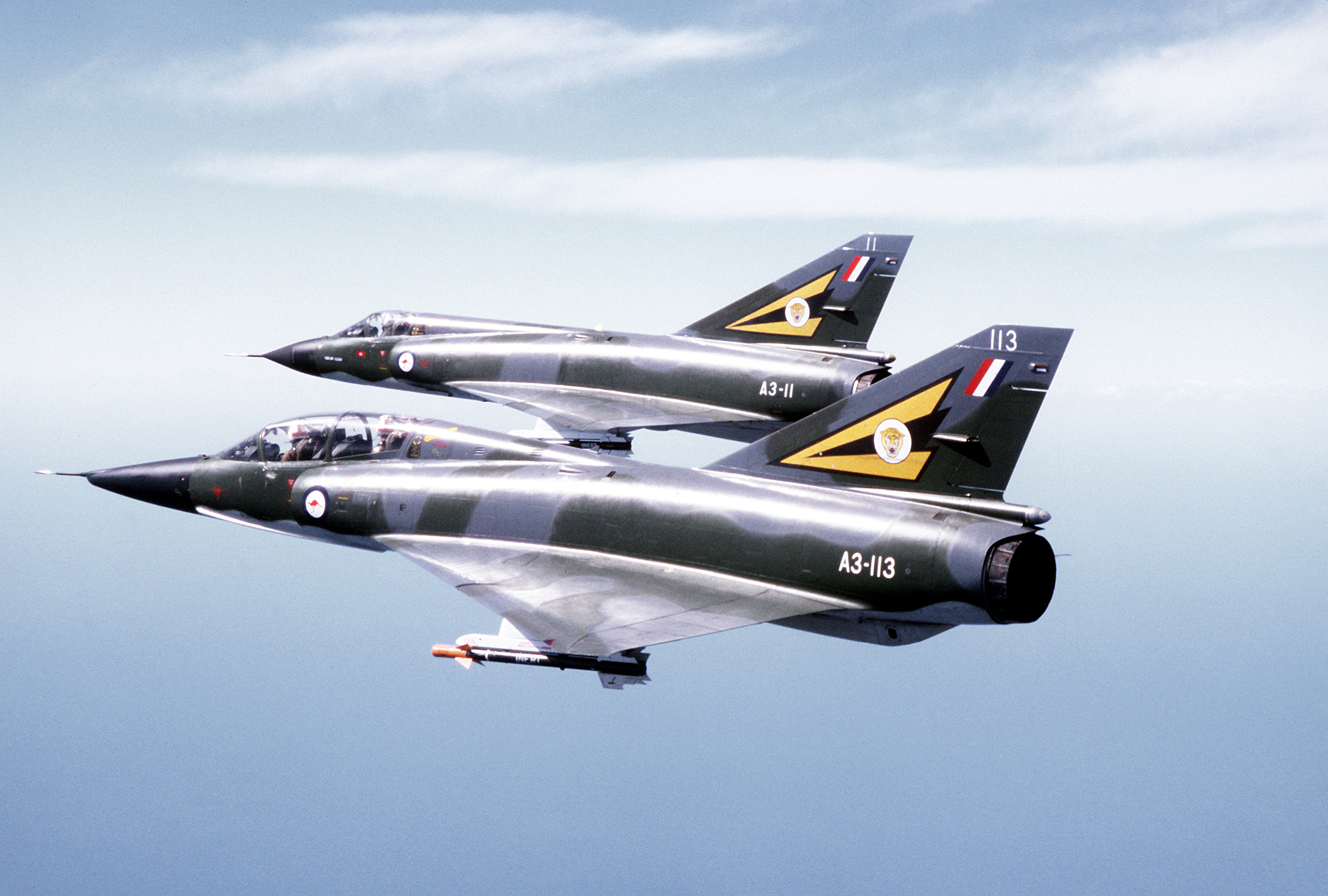
Mirage IIIs of No. 2 OCU (pictured in 1980)

Drummond's acting rank of wing commander became substantive on 1 January 1967. He took command of No. 3 Squadron on 3 February. Recently returned to Williamtown following duty at Butterworth, Malaysia, the unit was to convert from Sabres to Dassault Mirage IIIO supersonic fighters. Drummond undertook No. 9 Mirage Course with No. 2 Operational Conversion Unit (OCU), commencing on 10 April. He was on a high-altitude combat exercise with three other Mirages on 17 May when his aircraft dived into the sea around 50 nautical miles (93 km) north-east of Williamtown. Drummond had sounded no alert, nor had the jet suffered any obvious structural failure. The other Mirages searched the area but spotted only an oil slick; an air-and-sea search continued for several days but did not locate Drummond or his aircraft.

The court of inquiry into the accident investigated several possible explanations including engine problems, oxygen system failure, and pilot incapacity. It found that the Mirage was fully serviceable prior to the flight. The inquiry also considered Drummond's flying ability and physical fitness. It noted that he was an above-average pilot with "exceptional leadership abilities" based on career assessments and evaluation by the USAF during his recent tour of duty in Vietnam. His medical officer testified that Drummond had been fully assessed four months previously and was fit to fly without restriction. Margaret Drummond was also called as a witness. She said that over the past six weeks her husband had suffered instances of severe headache, double vision, chest pain and heartburn. In response, the medical officer opined that Drummond may have had a heart attack in the air, pointing out that a cardiovascular issue that was manageable on the ground could be exacerbated under flying conditions, and meant that the pilot would be unable to use his radio. The court concluded that such an attack was the most likely explanation for the accident; the Air Officer Commanding Operational Command considered it "reasonable to assume that the cause lay in pilot incapacity". Later that year, the former Chairman of the Chiefs of Staff Committee, Air Chief Marshal Sir Frederick Scherger, was quoted as saying that it "looked like a pilot collapse". Air Commodore Mark Lax, writing in the Defence Department's Aviation Safety Spotlight magazine in 2017, considered that Drummond was "well on track to become the Chief of the Air Staff", and speculated that he may have kept quiet about his symptoms to avoid any restrictions on flying.

Wing Commander Jake Newham succeeded Drummond as commanding officer of No. 3 Squadron. Drummond's DFC was gazetted on 26 September 1967, backdated to 14 September. Margaret Drummond, accompanied by the couple's son, was presented with the decoration at Government House, Canberra, in April the following year.

In 2013 and 2014, local newspapers reported plans to salvage the Wirraway that Drummond ditched in Lake Corangamite in 1950. In August 2021, a specially designed gantry was used to lift the fuselage of the Wirraway out of the lake.
