= Sergey Vishnyakov =

Soviet air force officer (1918–1958)

Sergey Fedorovich Vishnyakov
- Сергей Фёдорович Вишняков
- Born: 17 November 1918; Novozybkov, Ukrainian SSR
- Died: 10 June 1958 (aged 39); People's Republic of Bulgaria
- Military career
- Allegiance: Soviet Union
- Branch: Soviet Air Force
- Service years: 1940 – 1955
- Rank: General-Major of Aviation
- Commands: 176th Guards Fighter Aviation Regiment
- Conflicts: World War II; Korean War
- Awards: Order of Lenin

Sergey Fyodorovich Vishnyakov (Russian: Сергей Фёдорович Вишняков; 17 November 1918 – 10 June 1958) was a Soviet Air Force officer who fought in World War II and the Korean War, and one of the few pilots considered a flying ace of both wars. He was killed in a flying accident in Bulgaria in 1958.

== Early life ==
Vishnyakov was born on 17 November 1918 Novozybkov, Orel Region. After completing his seventh grade of school in 1933 he went on to attend a factory apprenticeship school (FZU), which he graduated from in 1934. He went on to work at a factory, and attended a local aeroclub until being drafted into the military in 1940. Upon graduating from the Borisoglebsk Military Aviation School of Pilots in autumn 1941 with the rank of sergeant he was deployed to the warfront of World War II as a pilot in the 28th Fighter Aviation Regiment in October.

== World War II ==
Although he arrived at the warfront in 1941 and soon began to participate in combat, he only gained a single shared aerial victory in January 1942 before being transferred to the 434th Fighter Aviation Regiment. There, he quickly reached the rank of lieutenant and went on to gain his first solo aerial victory on 5 March 1943, taking out a FW 190. Later on in the war the regiment was honored with the guards designation and renamed as the 32nd Guards Fighter Aviation Regiment. In the unit, Vishnyakov flourished; having totaled four shootdowns in March 1943 alone, he was soon promoted to flight commander in July. Although he was slightly wounded during a mission on 29 June 1944, he went on to gain additional shootdowns that year, bringing his tally for the war to ten solo plus one shared shootdowns. By the end of the war, he held the rank of major and held the position of squadron commander, having totaled 308 sorties and 95 aerial battles. After the end of the war he remained in the regiment and eventually became the assistant regimental commander in aerial combat tactics.

== Korean War ==
Having been appointed a flight techniques inspector of the 324th Fighter Aviation Division in March 1950, he was deployed to China in December that year with the rest of the division. However, he was given command of the 176th Guards Fighter Aviation Regiment in April 1951 after issues came up with the regiment's commander at the time resulting in Ivan Kozhedub deciding to seek out a more experienced leader for the regiment and eventually choosing Vishnyakov. Later that month on 24 April he made his first combat sortie in the war, during which the MiGs he was flying with encountered a group of eight F-86s. During the ensuing dogfight, captain Vasily Murashev of the third squadron was shot down by William Hoyd while attacking the two F-86 on Vishnyakov's tail, and although he survived by bailing out of his crippled plane via his parachute, his injuries rendered him unable to continue flying in the war. Eventually on 20 June Vishnyakov himself gained his first aerial victory over Korea, shooting down a piston-engined (Note: Sources differ if the aircraft shot down by Vishnyakov that day was a P-51 Mustang or a F4U Corsair) US aircraft over Simbi-do island at an altitude of approximately 2000 meters. Later on in the war on 8 June over Sensen, Vishnyakov took credit for his first jet shootdown after leading a group of 20 MiGs in a dogfight against 24 F-86; however, because he fired at the enemy aircraft from a significant distance during the battle and US records do not indicate any jets were written off that day combined with the high rate of overclaiming in the Korean War, the most plausible explanation is that Vishnyakov simply damaged an F-86 instead of gaining a true shootdown on that day. However, in December that year, he went on to gain several credited aerial victories in a short period of time. On 1 December he led a group of 20 crews from his regiment to a spot where enemy aircraft were expected to arrive: there, at an altitude of 7,500 meters, they came across 16 Australian Gloster Meteors, which were fairly vulnerable to the MiGs. Vishnyakov ordered ten of the MiGs under his command to stay above them as cover, while he led the remaining crews in an attack on the Gloster Meteors. In the ensuing combat, the Soviet pilots claimed nine shootdowns without suffering any losses, including one attributed to Vishnyakov. However, Australian reports paint a very different picture of the encounter, claiming to have shot down a MiG and lost in that lost only three, not nine aircraft in the battle. Argentine aviation historian Diego Zampini counts five Australian losses since an additional two Australian aircraft were written off after returning to base due to the damage sustained. In consideration of the fact that Vishnyakov fired at the enemy aircraft he was pursuing at a distance of around 800 meters, the aircraft he hit was most likely No. A77-17 or No. A77-982, which were damaged in the battle but eventually returned to service. The next day he gained another credited aerial victory; there he led a group of 18 MiGs over Pyongyang, where they intercepted 16 F-84s at an altitude of 4,000 meters at 10:42 AM, which they subsequently dispersed and claimed to have shot down three of. However, it is unclear exactly which aircraft, if at all, that Vishnyakov show down that day. Over the next several days he tallied his last two aerial victories. On 5 December, Vishnyakov led a group of 22 MiGs in intercepting a group of 12 F-80s and 4 F-84s over Dzyunsen. With cover provided by other aircraft in his unit, he pursued an F-84 and shot it down, presumably F-84E 49-2415 piloted by Hugh Larkin, who parachuted out of his stricken plane and declared missing. Several days later on 8 December he claimed his last aerial victory in Korea, having led 20 MiGs from his regiment in a dogfight with 24 F-86s. In the resulting battle, Vishnyakov and two other Soviet pilots claimed aerial victories, but American records indicate the loss of only one F-86 from that encounter, F-86E 50-622, so it is unclear which Soviet pilot or pilots was responsible for it. Throughout the war he flew approximately 100 sorties, engaged in 36 aerial battles, and claimed six aerial victories. (Note: It is very difficult to verify Korean War pilot shootdowns for a variety of reasons. Nevertheless, in recent years as more information from loss reports from both sides has become available, aviation historians have noticed high rates of overclaiming were prevalent on both sides of the conflict, casting doubt on the ace status claims of many pilots. For more information, read about overestimation of aerial victories in the Korean War)

== Later life and death ==
Initially after returning to the USSR he continued to command his wartime regiment. In January 1953 he graduated from training for commanders and chiefs of staff of aviation divisions at the Air Force Academy. Starting in November 1953 he served as deputy commander of the 324th Fighter Aviation Division, and in February 1955 he became the unit's commander. Subsequently in December 1957 he was appointed as military adviser to the commander of fighter aviation in the Bulgarian People's Army. During that post he was tasked with participating in training flights; during one such flight at night in a MiG-15UTI with a Bulgarian pilot on 10 June 1958, after the plane made a sharp maneuver, the cockpit canopy was torn off, hitting Vishnyakov in the head and killing him instantly. The Bulgarian pilot managed to land the plane safely, and Vishnyakov was buried in Kaluga.

== Awards ==
- Order of Lenin (22 April 1952)
- Four Order of the Red Banner (4 March 1942, 31 July 1943, 7 April 1944, 25 September 1952)
- Three Order of the Patriotic War (1st class - 30 May 1943 and 11 October 1944; 2nd class - 10 September 1944)
- Two Order of the Red Star (22 April 1955 and 26 October 1955)
- campaign medals

== Breakdown of aerial victories ==
World War II
Date	Enemy aircraft	Aircraft flown
6 January 1943	He 111 (Note: Shared kill in a group of three)	MiG-3
5 March 1943	FW 190	Yak-1
6 March 1943	Bf 109	Yak-1
9 March 1943	Bf 109	Yak-1
9 March 1943	Ju 88	Yak-1
12 July 1943	Ju 88	La-5
23 July 1943	He 111	La-5
15 December 1943	FW 190	La-5
18 March 1944	FW 190	La-5
16 September 1944	FW 190	La-7
29 October 1944	FW 190	La-7

Korean War
Date	Enemy aircraft	Aircraft flown	Notes
20 June 1951	F4U-4 or P-51	MiG-15	Possibly F4U-4 #80824 from VF-884 and mistaken by Soviet pilots as a P-51.
8 July 1951	F-86	MiG-15	Probably only damaged.
1 December 1951	Gloster Meteor	MiG-15	Presumably Gloster Meteor Mk.8 No. A77-17 or No. A77-982.
2 December 1951	F-86	MiG-15	Status unclear.
5 December 1951	F-84	MiG-15	Presumably F-84E #49-2415 piloted by Hugh Larkin, who was declared MIA.
8 December 1951	F-86	MiG-15	Presumably F-86E #50-622 piloted by Levi R. Chase. Claimed by two other Soviet pilots.
