= 176th Guards Fighter Aviation Regiment =

176th Guards Fighter Aviation Regiment PVO
- Active: 1938–1960
- Country: Soviet Union
- Branch: Soviet Air Defense Forces
- Type: Fighter aviation regiment
- Engagements: World War II; Korean War
- Decorations: Order of the Red Banner; Order of Kutuzov 3rd class; Order of Aleksandr Nevsky
- Battle honours: Proskurov

The 176th Fighter Aviation Regiment PVO was a fighter regiment of the Soviet Air Defense Forces during World War II and the Cold War. The unit was disbanded in March 1960.

== History ==
=== Prewar and World War II ===
The unit was formed on 22 March 1938 as the 19th Fighter Aviation Regiment (IAP) at Gorelovo in the Leningrad Military District from the 58th and 70th Separate Fighter Aviation Squadrons and the 33rd Separate Reconnaissance Aviation Squadron. Equipped with Polikarpov I-15bis fighters, the regiment formed part of the 54th Light (Fighter) Aviation Brigade of the Air Forces of the Leningrad Military District (VVS of the Leningrad Military District). It was shifted to the Skomorokhi airfield in the Kiev Special Military District on 9 September 1939 in order to fight in the Soviet invasion of Poland, which it fought in between 17 and 28 September as part of the VVS Ukrainian Front's 59th Fighter Aviation Brigade, equipped with the Polikarpov I-16 fighter.

The 19th IAP returned to the Leningrad Military District in October, and between 30 November 1939 and 13 March 1940 fought in the Winter War against Finland as part of the 54th Fighter Aviation Brigade of the VVS 7th Army of the Northwestern Front. It initially included three squadrons of I-16s and one I-15bis squadron; the latter was transferred to the north in mid-December and replaced by a new I-16-equipped 4th Aviation Squadron by the beginning of January. During the war, the regiment was officially credited with flying 3,646 sorties, downing three Finnish aircraft in aerial combat and destroying two on the ground, and 74 locomotives and 150 railcars destroyed in ground attacks; it suffered no losses. For its "exemplary performance of combat missions", the 19th IAP was awarded the Order of the Red Banner on 11 April.

The regiment became part of the 3rd Fighter Aviation Division (IAD) of the VVS Leningrad Military District in November 1940. At the beginning of Operation Barbarossa, the German invasion of the Soviet Union, on 22 June 1941, the regiment fielded fifty I-16s, twenty Polikarpov I-153, and fifteen Mikoyan-Gurevich MiG-3 fighters for a total of 85 aircraft in five squadrons. By this point the 3rd IAD was part of the Northern Air Defense Zone of the National Air Defense Forces (PVO). Senior Lieutenant S.V. Tyutyunnikov claimed the regiment's first aerial victory of the war on 6 July, a German Junkers Ju 88 bomber near Lake Lubenskoye. The regiment became part of the 7th Fighter Aviation Corps PVO when the division expanded into the latter on the next day. During the month, it was reorganized to a three-squadron structure authorized thirty aircraft, transferring the I-153-equipped 4th Squadron to the 192nd IAP and the I-16-equipped 5th Squadron to the 195th IAP. While still flying missions, it converted two squadrons to the MiG-3 and one squadron to the Lavochkin-Gorbunov-Gudkov LaGG-3 fighter. In addition to air defense, the 19th IAP also flew ground attack missions and provided air cover in support of the ground troops of the Leningrad Front until 23 August.

The squadron absorbed five pilots and their MiG-3s from the 35th Fighter Aviation Regiment on 12 September. Due to losses, it was withdrawn to Cherepovets from 18 October to reorganize to a two-squadron structure with twenty fighters and two Polikarpov U-2 communication aircraft, which occurred on 17 November. A month later, the regiment transferred to Semyka in Gorky Oblast to re-equip with LaGG-3s in the Moscow Military District with the 2nd Reserve Fighter Aviation Regiment, remaining there until February. From 25 February, it fought as part of the 2nd Reserve Aviation Group of the Supreme High Command, operating under the command of the VVS Volkhov Front. Beginning on 26 April, the 19th served as the training center for the VVS Volkhov Front, returning to the 2nd Reserve IAP on 15 July to retrain on the new Lavochkin La-5 fighter. It was relocated without aircraft to Lyubertsy on 9 August, and there reorganized on 23 October to consist of three squadrons with ten aircraft each. It joined the 269th IAD at Buturlinovka on 27 December.

The 19th went back into combat with the 269th as part of the 2nd Air Army of the Voronezh Front on 2 January 1943. To receive new personnel, it was withdrawn to Morshansk in the Volga Military District with the 4th Reserve Fighter Aviation Regiment on 20 March. The regiment was sent back to the 2nd Air Army reserve between 3 and 25 July, with which it conducted combat training without flying in combat. It was moved to Chkalovsky on 4 August at the disposal of the commander of the Red Army Air Forces, where it was reorganized to consist of three squadron totalling 40 aircraft in September. The regiment returned to combat on 8 January 1944 as an independent fighter regiment tasked with sweeping the skies for German aircraft, directly subordinated to the headquarters of the 2nd Air Army, now part of the 1st Ukrainian Front.

For its courage in the recapture of Proskurov, Kamianets-Podilskyi, Chortkiv, Husiatyn, and Zalishchyky, the 19th IAP received the Proskurov honorific on 3 April. Transferred to the 16th Air Army of the 1st Belorussian Front on 6 June, it became the first Red Army Air Forces regiment to receive the Lavochkin La-7 fighter in that month. The 19th was transferred to the 6th Air Army of the front between 7 July and 19 August, when it returned to the 16th Air Army. After receiving the Order of Alexander Nevsky on 9 August for its courage in the breakthrough of German defenses west of Kovel, the regiment was converted into the 176th Guards Fighter Aviation Regiment on 17 August in recognition of its "courage and heroism" during the war. In January 1945 it was operationally subordinated to the command of the army's 3rd Fighter Aviation Corps. After the end of the war on 9 May, the 176th Guards were awarded the Order of Kutuzov, 3rd class, on 11 June for their "exemplary performance of combat missions" during the Battle of Berlin.

=== Postwar ===
On 1 December 1951, over Sunchon, at least twenty MiG 15's from the 176th attacked a formation of fourteen Royal Australian Air Force No. 77 Squadron Meteors. Three Meteors were shot down.

The 176th Guards were finally renamed as 176th Guards Fighter Aviation Regiment PVO in February 1952.

The 176th Guards IAP was disbanded between 26 March and 31 May 1960, together with the 98th Guards Fighter Aviation Division.

In 1966, by request of top fighter ace Ivan Kozhedub, all honors of the 176th were transferred to the 234th Fighter Aviation Regiment, based at Kubinka and assigned to the 9th Fighter Aviation Division of the Air Forces of the Moscow Military District. The 234th had been formed on 1 December 1950 from pilots of the 176th who did not depart for Korea. Its designation thus became the 234th Guards Proskurov Red Banner Orders of Kutuzov and Alexander Nevsky Regiment.

After the war and until 1967 the 234th Guards participated in the air parades over Red Square in Moscow. Its personnel flew at air shows in Sweden (1967 and 1975), France (1971), and Finland (1974) in order to demonstrate modern Soviet aviation technology and flying prowess. Beginning in the 1950s, the pilots of the regiment carried out aerial escort and welcome duties for flights arriving in the Soviet Union carrying foreign delegations and the first Soviet cosmonauts, among others. For their successes in combat and political training and in honor of the 50th anniversary of the Komsomol, the regiment received the Lenin Komsomol honorific on 17 October 1968.

In 1989, as a result of Air Forces reforms. the 234th Guards was renamed the 237th Guards Center for Display of Aviation Equipment (237 Gv. TsPAT). In the fall of 2009, the 237th Center was disbanded at Kubinka during the reorganization of the Russian Armed Forces.

== Commanders ==
The following officers commanded the regiment:

- Captain Andrey Grigoryevich Tkachenko (October 1940–11 October 1942, promoted Major)
- Major Leonid Aleksandrovich Orlov (11 November 1942–killed 17 March 1943)
- Major Georgy Andreyevich Pustovoyt (March–August 1943)
- Lieutenant Colonel Lev Shestakov (August 1943–killed 17 March 1944, promoted Colonel)
- Lieutenant Colonel Pavel Fyodorovich Chupikov (26 March 1944–8 October 1947)
- Lieutenant Colonel Konstantin Konstantinovich Kotelnikov (November 1947–1948)
- Lieutenant Colonel Aleksandr Sergeyevich Kumanichkin (April–November 1948)
- Lieutenant Colonel Nikolay Nikolayevich Shulzhenko (November 1948–November 1950)
- Lieutenant Colonel Andrey Semyonovich Koshel (November 1950–April 1951)
- Lieutenant Colonel Sergey Vishnyakov (July 1951–November 1952)
- Lieutenant Colonel Aleksandr Babayev (1952–1954)
- Lieutenant Colonel Ivan Suchkov (November 1954–July 1955)

== Aircraft operated ==
Aircraft operated by 176th.
| From | To | Aircraft | Version |
|---|---|---|---|
| 1938 | 1941 | Polikarpov I-15 | I-15bis |
| 1938 | 1941 | Polikarpov I-16 | |
| 1938 | 1941 | Polikarpov I-153 | |
| 1941 | 1942 | Lavochkin-Gorbunov-Gudkov LaGG-3 | |
| 1942 | 1944 | Lavochkin La-5 | |
| 1944 | 1948 | Lavochkin La-7 | |
| 1948 | 1949 | Lavochkin La-9 | |
| 1948 | 1949 | Lavochkin La-11 | |
| 1949 | 1956 | Mikoyan-Gurevich MiG-15 | |
| 1954 | 1960 | Mikoyan-Gurevich MiG-17 | |
