= 113th Operations Group =

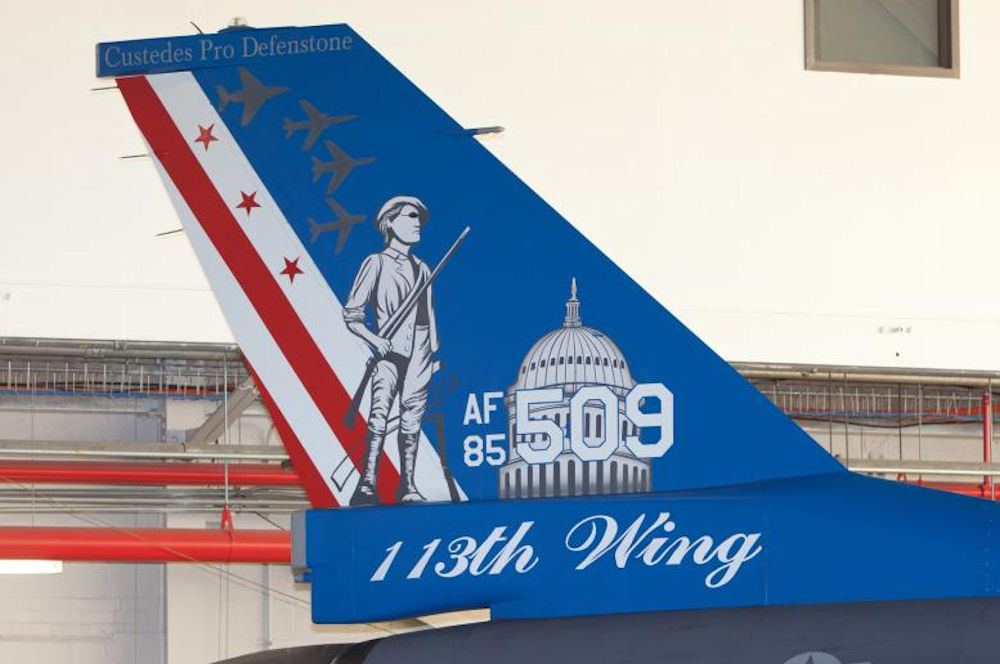
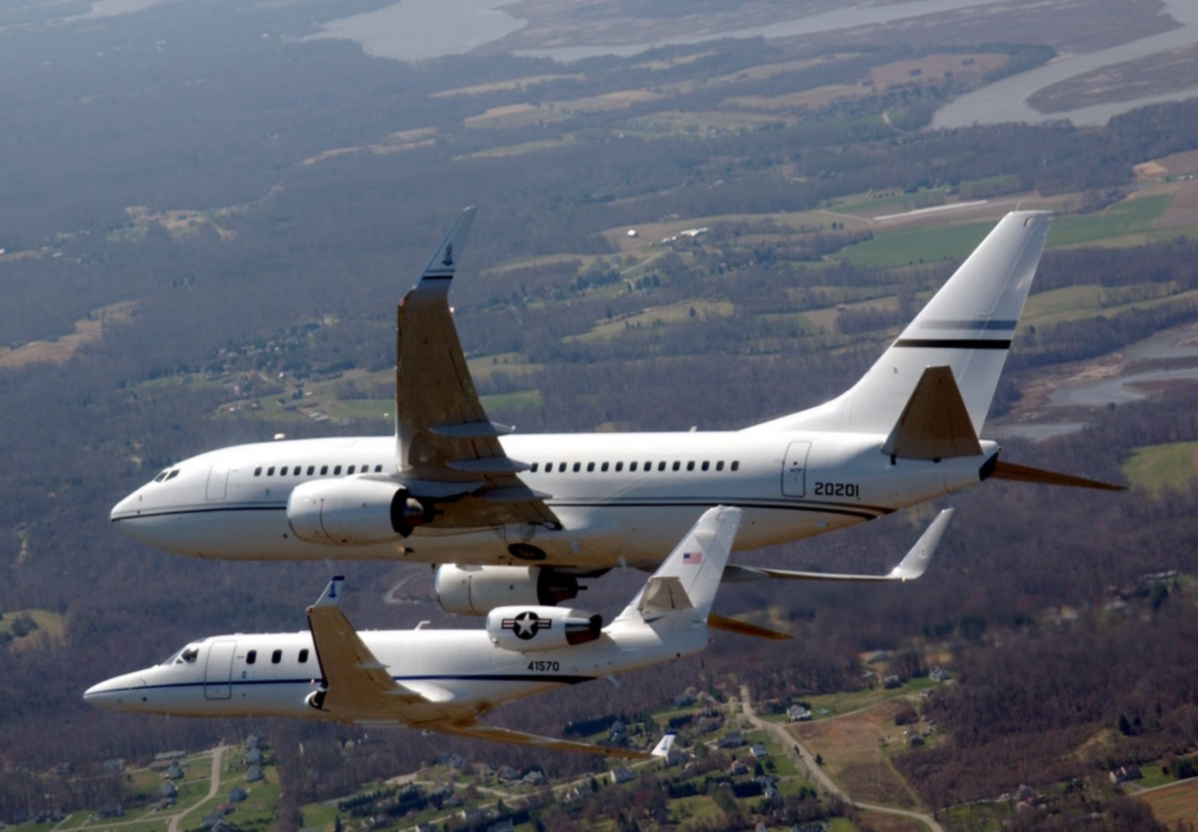
- 121st Fighter Squadron F-16 tail markings (Note: Aircraft is F-16D block 30 serial 85-1509.) 201st Airlift Squadron C-38 and C-40 (Note: Aircraft are Gulfstream C-38A Courier serial 94-1570 and Boeing C-40C Clipper serial 02-201).)
- Active: 1942–1945; 1946–1952; 1952–1974; 1993–present
- Country: United States
- Branch: Air National Guard
- Type: Composite Unit
- Role: Fighter and Airlift
- Part of: District of Columbia Air National Guard
- Garrison/HQ: Joint Base Andrews, Maryland
- Nickname: Blue nosed Bastards of Bodney (WW II)
- Motto: Second to None (WW II) Custodes Pro Defensione Latin Guardians for Defense
- Engagements: European Theater of Operations
- Decorations: Distinguished Unit Citation; French Croix de Guerre with Palm

Commanders
- Commander: Colonel Christopher "LAW" Wilson
- Deputy Commander: Colonel Jerome "Chain" Wonnum
- Senior Enlisted Leader: CMSgt Eric Basinger

Insignia
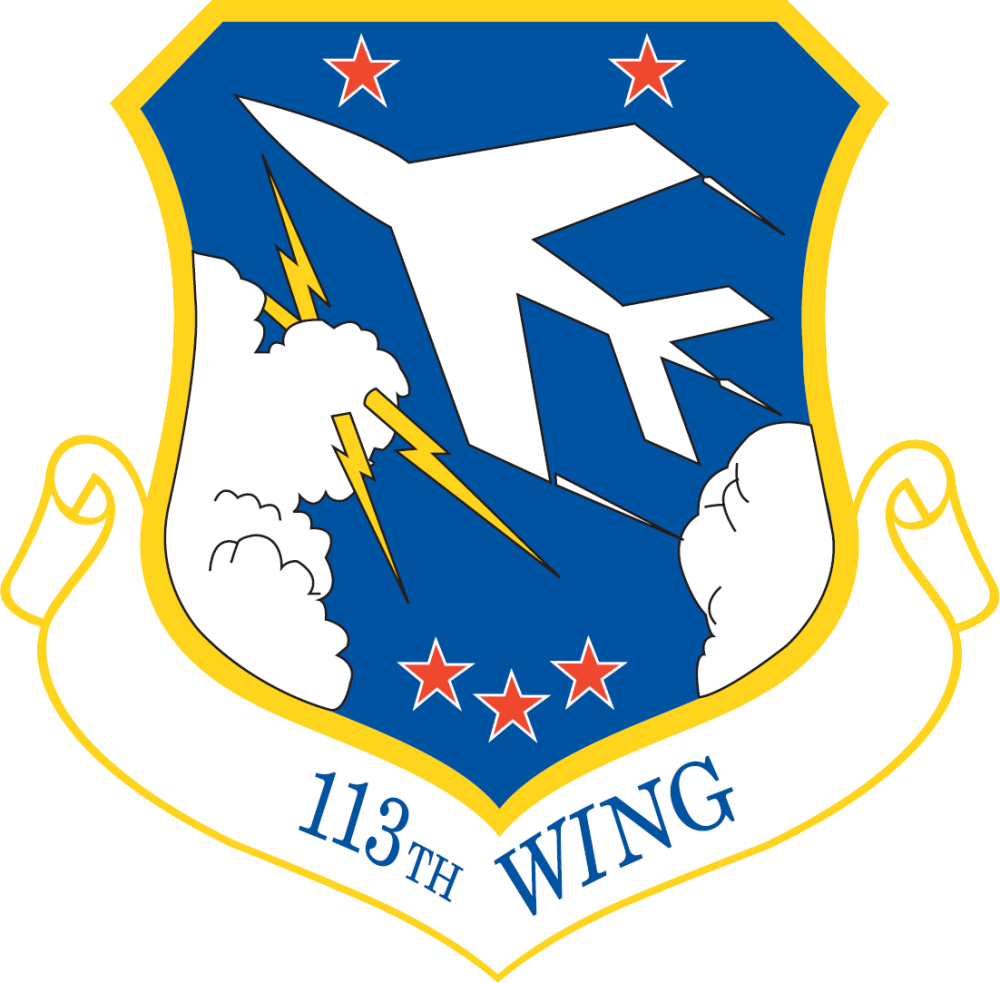
- 113th Wing emblem (Approved 9 March 1954) (Note: The group uses the wing emblem with the group designation on the scroll. Air Force Instruction 84-105, Organizational Lineage, Honors and Heraldry, 19 March 2013, para 3.3.3)
- Tail Markings: DC Red tailstripe with stars

The 113th Operations Group is a flying group of the United States Air Force. It provides air sovereignty forces to defend District of Columbia and also provides fighter, airlift and support forces capable of local, national and global employment.

The group's primary mission is training of air combat and operational airlift crews for national defense. The group also provides a ready response force of fighters for the defense of the District of Columbia area. Members of the group also assist local and federal law enforcement agencies in combating drug trafficking in the District of Columbia on a case-by-case basis.

Its predecessor, the 352nd Fighter Group, was one of the most highly decorated United States Army Air Forces Fighter Groups in World War II, producing many leading aces of the war. The 352d was composed of three squadrons: (the 328th, 486th and 487th Fighter Squadrons). Once deployed to the European Theater of Operations (ETO), the group was eventually headquartered in RAF Bodney, England before being forward deployed to Belgium. It performed a variety of missions for the Eighth Air Force, but predominantly served as bomber escort.

The 121st Fighter Squadron of the 113th Operations Group, is a descendant organization of the 121st Observation Squadron, established on 10 July 1940. It is one of the National Guard observation squadrons formed before World War II

== History ==
=== World War II ===
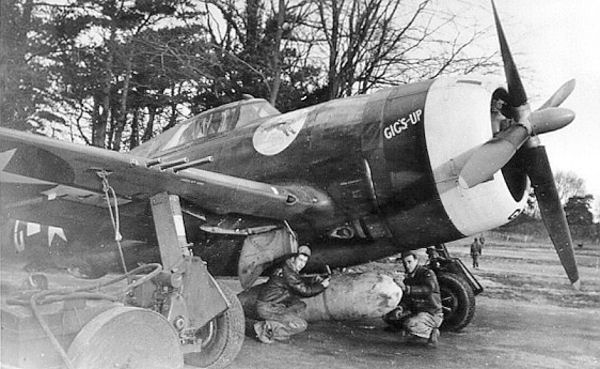
486th Fighter Squadron P-47 (Note: Aircraft is Republic P-47D-2-RA Thunderbolt serial 42-22548 "Gigs-Up".)

The 352d Fighter Group was activated at Mitchel Field, New York on 1 October 1942, and quickly moved to Bradley Field, Connecticut to begin organization. The group was equipped with the Republic P-47 Thunderbolt fighter. The initial squadrons to be assigned were the 21st and 34th Fighter Squadrons (under the command of 1st Lt John C. Meyer) and the newly activated 328th. On 18 May 1943 the assignment of the 21st and 34th Squadrons was retroactively revoked and they were replaced by the 486th and 487th Fighter Squadrons effective 1 October 1942.

The group absorbed new personnel, moving several times from Bradley Field to Westover Field, Massachusetts in November and then to Trumbull Field, Connecticut in January 1943 where it received the majority of personnel. Once aircraft were received and pilots proficient, the squadrons were assigned to alert duty over New York City, operating from LaGuardia Airport where pilots often performed acrobatic maneuvers on takeover much to chagrin of the tower, routinely buzzed Yankee Stadium and engaged in dogfights over the city thereby garnering attention of authorities. Shortly thereafter, the 328th was moved back to Mitchel Field in and was joined by the 487th in March. The 486th moved to Republic Field on 8 March. Training was in its advanced phase when the group was reassembled at Westover in late May in anticipation of deployment orders. The order to deploy arrived in June and the group moved to Camp Kilmer, New Jersey to prepare to embark aboard the ocean liner RMS Queen Elizabeth, leaving on 1 July 1943 for Scotland and service with the Eighth Air Force.

==== Combat operations ====
The first missions of the 352d were flown on 9 September 1943 when the Thunderbolts flew an escort mission over the North Sea protecting Boeing B-17 Flying Fortress bombers returning from a raid over continental Europe. Skirmishes with the Luftwaffe were frequent, but it wasn't until 26 November when Major John C. Meyer of the 487th Squadron scored the group's first victory over Europe, a Messerschmitt Bf 109 fighter. Meyer later became deputy commander of the 352d during its most successful period of operations.

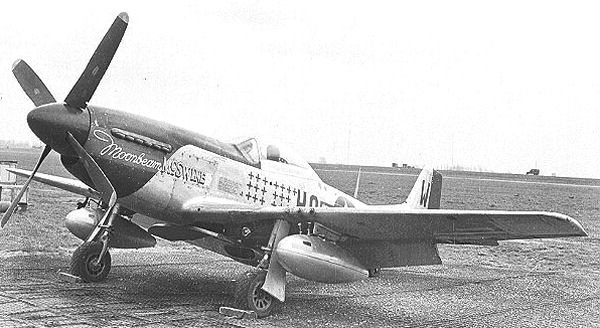
487th Fighter Squadron P-51 (Note: Aircraft is North American P-51D-10-NA Mustang serial 44-14237 "Moonbeam McSwine".)

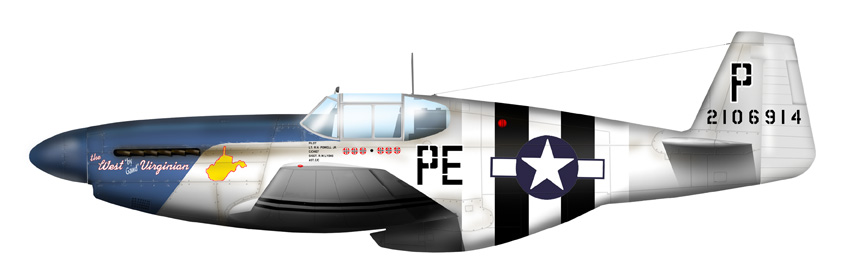
P-51B of 352d FG/328th FS pilot, Lt. Robert "Punchy" Powell

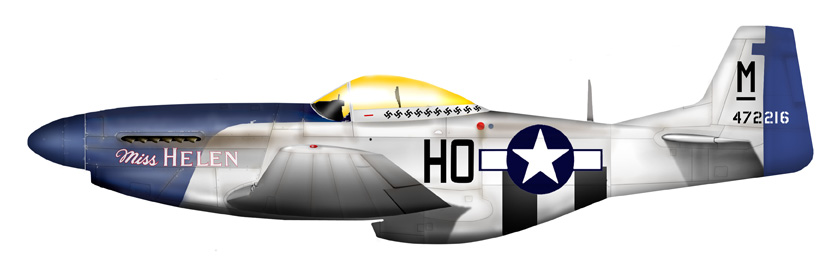
P-51D-15 of 352d FG/487th FS ace, Capt. Ray Littge

On 8 April 1944, the 352d exchanged its radial-engined P-47s for sleek North American P-51 Mustang fighter planes. It was then that the Group adopted their unique blue nose marking and the nickname the "Blue Nosed Bastards of Bodney."

Notable pilots of the 352d include top scoring P-51 aces Major George Preddy and Col. John C. Meyer, Capt. John Thornell, Capt. William T. Whisner, Captain Donald S. Bryan, Capt. Raymond H. Littge, Lt. Robert "Punchy" Powell, Capt. John "Smokey" Stover and Capt. William C. Miller.

==== New Year's Day 1945 at Y-29 ====
One of the 352d's greatest accomplishments was its huge victory over the Luftwaffe on 1 January 1945. In December 1944, the 352d received orders to deploy to Asch Airfield, a remote field approximately 3 miles south-southeast of As, Belgium. After arriving on 22 December, it began operating on the 24th. Poor weather hampered flight operations and the Battle of Bulge was raging nearby. Unknown to the Allies, the Luftwaffe was preparing a New Year's Day attack, designated Operation Bodenplatte against sixteen forward deployed Allied airfields in the area. Similar to the preparations for the Battle of Bulge, the Luftwaffe had been quietly preparing and assembling virtually every available fighter on the Western Front and had an estimated 800 fighters and fighter bombers ready to execute an attack when the Allies might be off guard following celebration of New Year's Eve. The concept was simple – a mass attack on newly established continental bases to destroy as many Allied aircraft on the ground and ease the pressure on German ground forces engaged in the battle of the Bulge. However, many of the Luftwaffe pilots were poorly trained and did not have the experience necessary to battle seasoned Allied pilots.

John C. Meyer had risen to be Deputy Commander of the 352d by December and was now a lieutenant colonel. He suspected that the Germans might use New Year's Day as an opportunity to attack and decided to have Y-29 in readiness when the sun rose. While haggling with higher authorities at Ninth Air Force throughout the night, he ordered a squadron assigned to do a morning sweep and ordered the pilots not to engage in any alcoholic celebration the night prior. Although he did not get permission until 0800, he joined the 487th Fighter Squadron in the frigid cold of the snowy weather at 0530 preflighting their Mustangs and was sitting in the cockpit of the lead aircraft. As the Mustangs were awaiting take-off for the morning patrol, their airfield was overrun with Luftwaffe fighters from Jagdgeschwader 11 (JG.11).

Nevertheless, when the group of 50+ Bodenplatte aircraft of JG.11 showed up over Y-29, the 12 blue-nosed Mustangs of the 487th were queuing for take-off with Meyer in the lead Mustang. While accelerating down the snow-packed runway, Lt. Col. Meyer opened the day's count by shooting down a German fighter in a head-on pass as it tried to strafe a parked Douglas C-47 Skytrain next to the runway. The German had not noticed the P-51 taking off. Meyer began firing before his wheels fully retracted and downed the marauding Focke-Wulf Fw 190. Though surrounded by strafing fighters, every one of the 487th planes got off the ground to meet their attackers.

In the battle that followed, 24 Luftwaffe fighters were destroyed by the 352d Group. However, one pilot, Lt. Dean Huston, was forced to belly land his P-51 after its cooling system was holed from the fire of zealous British antiaircraft gunners. Two pilots of the 487th claimed 4 German fighters shot down. The 487th received the Distinguished Unit Citation. Meyer, Capt. Stanford Moats, and Capt. William T. Whisner, who scored his fourth victory while his Mustang was starting to overheat from battle damage, were each awarded the Distinguished Service Cross and four other pilots were award the Silver Star. Despite the group losing a couple of aircraft to battle damage, not a single pilot was lost during the New Year's Day battle. But the tragedy of war was never far away. During the afternoon of the same day, fighters of the 328th Squadron were patrolling the skies above As when they spotted what they thought were four inbound enemy aircraft. Due to static on radio communications with the 328th, identification of the aircraft came too late, and one of the approaching aircraft was shot down, crashing near the village of Zutendaal. The aircraft turned out to be RAF Hawker Typhoons of 183 Squadron from Gilze-Rijen on their way to their new base at Chievres. The pilot who was killed in the Typhoon that was shot down was F/Lt. Don Webber.

The group remained in England after V-E Day until November, when it returned to the United States and was inactivated at the New York Port of Embarkation.

==== Aces of the 352nd Fighter Group ====
Pilot	Sqdrn	Credits	Casualty Status	Personal Aircraft
Major George E. Preddy	487, 328	26.83	KIA 25 December 1944	"Cripes A'Mighty", "Cripes A'Mighty 3rd"
Lt Col. John C. Meyer	487	24		"Lambie", "Petie 2nd", "Petie 3rd"
Capt. John F. Thornell Jr	328	17.25		"Pattie Ann"
Capt. William T. Whisner Jr.	487	16.4		"Princess Elizabeth", "Moonbeam McSwine"
Major Donald S. Bryan	328	13.33		"Little One", "Little One II", "Little One III"
1st Lt. Glennon T. Moran	487	13.5		"Miss Ann"
Capt. Raymond H. Littge	487	10	Evaded 1944	"Silver Dollar", "E Pluribus Unum", "Miss Helen"
Lt Col. William T. Halton	328, 487	10		"Slender, Tender & Tall"
1st Lt. Virgil K. Meroney	487	9	POW 8 April 1944	"Sweet Louise", "Sweet Louise II"
Major Stephen W. Andrew	328	9	POW 2 July 1944	"Prairie Farmer", "Spirit of Los Angeles City College"
Capt. Charles J. Cesky	328	8.5	Evaded December 1944	"Diann Ruth", "Diann Ruth II"
1st Lt. Carl J. Luksic	487	8.5	POW 24 May 1944	"Lucky Boy'", "Elly's Lucky Boy"
Capt. Sanford K. Moats	487	8.5		"Kay", "Kay II"
Capt. Henry J. Miklajcyk	486	7.5	KIA 2 November 1944	"The Syracusan","The Syracusan III"
Capt. Frank A. Cutler	486	7.5	KIA 13 May 1944	"Soldier's Vote"
1st Lt. Walter E. Starck	487	7	POW 27 November 1944	"Lucia", "Starck Mad (L) Even Stevens (R)"
Lt Col. Willie O. Jackson Jr.	486	7		"Hot Stuff"
1st Lt. Francis W. Horne	328	5.5		"Hi Yo Silver", "Snoots' Sniper"
Capt. Edwin L. Heller	486	5.5		"Happy", "Hell-er Bust"
Capt. William J. Stangel	328	5		"Stinky 2nd"
1st Lt. Earl R. Lazear Jr.	486	5		"Pennie's Earl"
Capt. Clayton E. Davis	487	5	Evaded 17 August 1944	"Marjorie", "Marjorie II"
1st Lt. Ernest O. Bostrom	486	5		"Little Marjie"
Capt. Alexander F. Sears	487	5		"The Sheepherder"
Capt. Duerr H. Schuh	487	5		"Duchess"
Col. Joe L. Mason	Grp	5		"This Is It"
1st Lt. Alden P. Rigby	487	5		"EIleen & Jerry"

SOURCE:352nd Fighter Group Association

=== District of Columbia Air National Guard ===
The 352d Fighter Group was redesignated as the 113th Fighter Group and was allotted to the National Guard, on 24 May 1946. It was organized at Andrews Field, Maryland, and was extended federal recognition on 2 November 1946. The 104th at Harbor Airport, Maryland and 121st Fighter Squadron at Andrews were initially signed to the 113th Fighter Group and, upon federal recognition in 1947, the 149th Fighter Squadron at Byrd Field, Virginia was also assigned. In January 1947, the group assigned to the 53d Fighter Wing, located in Pennsylvania.

The group mission was to train for air defense when called to active service. It was equipped with the Republic P-47D Thunderbolt (later the F-47D). On 31 October 1950 the 53d Wing was inactivated and the 113th Fighter Wing was allotted to the Guard and activated in its place. Meanwhile, the group's 121st Squadron converted to the Republic F-84 Thunderjet.

==== Korean War activation ====
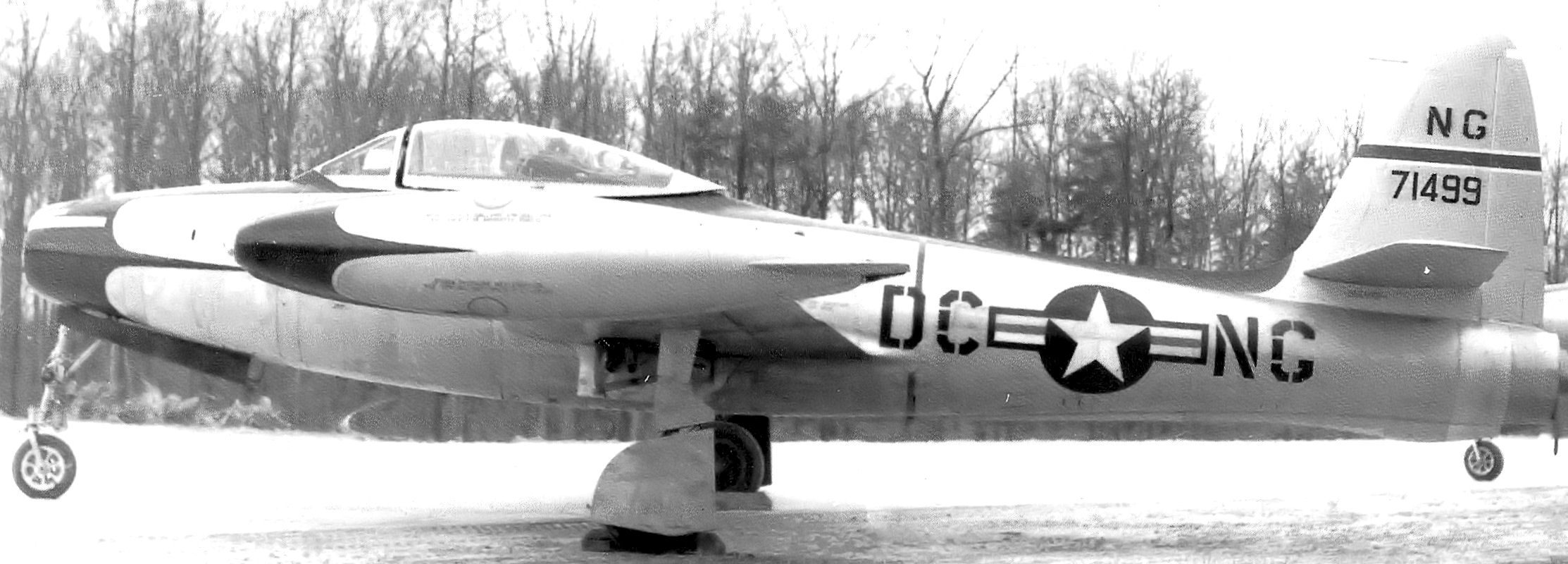
121st Fighter Squadron F-84 (Note: Aircraft is Republic F-84C Thunderjet serial 47-1499, taken about 1950)

With the surprise invasion of South Korea on 25 June 1950, and the regular military's lack of readiness, most of the Air National Guard was federalized placed on active duty. The 113th Fighter Group became part of Air Defense Command (ADC) on 1 February 1951 and was redesignated as a Fighter-Interceptor Group. The 121st Squadron was the only one of its squadrons activated with the group, which moved to Newcastle Air Force Base, where they were joined by the 142d Fighter-Interceptor Squadron if the Delaware Air National Guard, also equipped with the F-84Cs and the 148th Fighter Squadron of the Pennsylvania Air National Guard, flying F-51D Mustangs. In April 1951, the 148th began to convert to the F-84 as well. Once it completed its conversion to Thunderjets, the 148th moved to Dover Air Force Base, Delaware

In September and October 1951 the group converted to Lockheed F-94B Starfires with partial all-weather capabilities. During the six months the group was operational with the F-84C, each squadron had lost one example in an operational accident. The group was inactivated on 6 February 1952 in a major reorganization of ADC responding to ADC's difficulty under the existing wing base organizational structure in deploying fighter squadrons to best advantage. Its squadrons were assigned to the 4710th Defense Wing.

==== Cold War ====
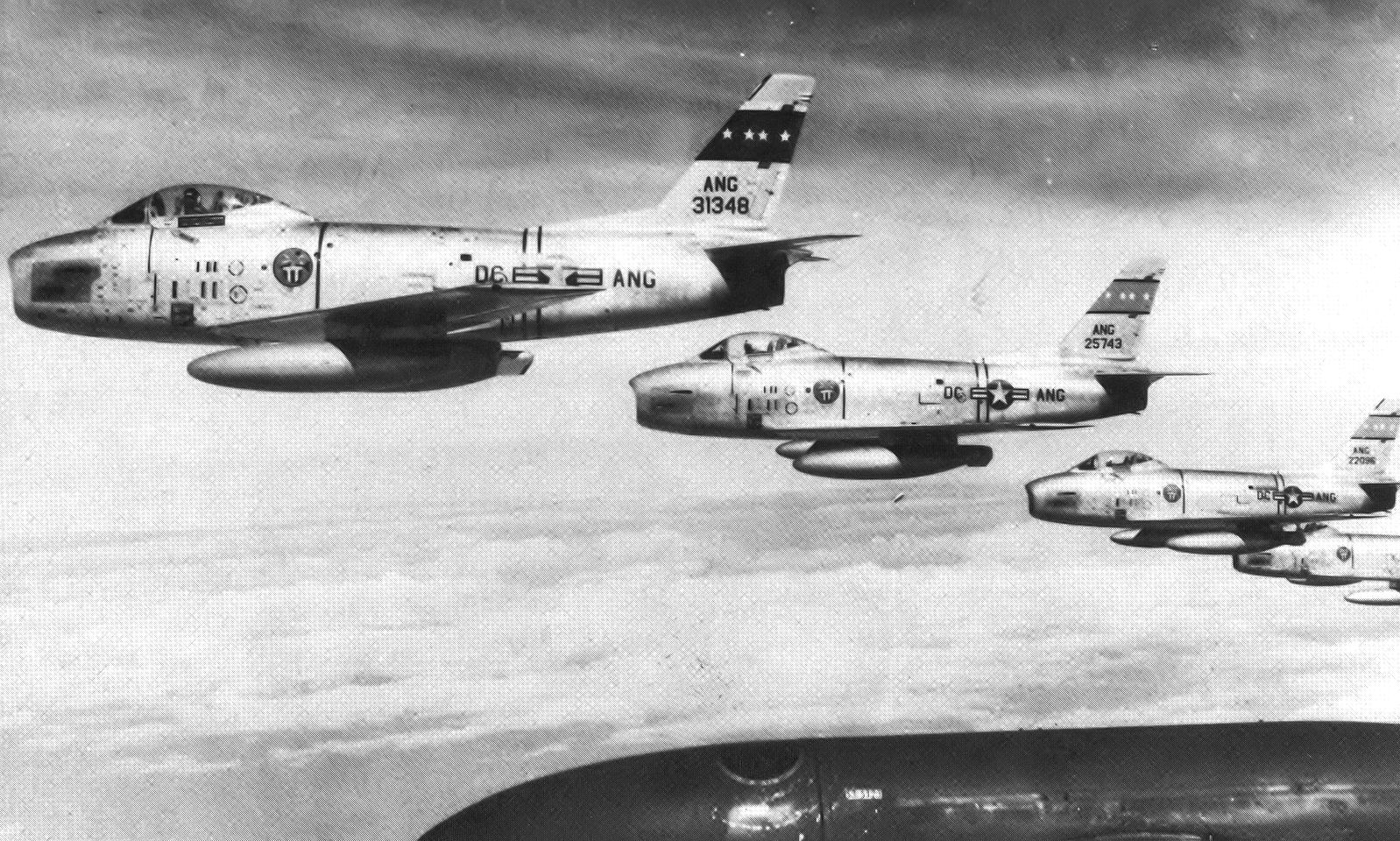
121st FIS F-86H formation

With its return to District of Columbia control, the group was re-equipped with propeller-driven F-51H Mustangs. It was not until 1954 that the 113th was upgraded to once again fly jets, receiving North American F-86A Sabres. In August 1954 it began keeping two planes on air defense alert status at Andrews from one hour before sunrise until one hour after sunset. This ADC alert lasted until the end of October 1958 as the group received later model Sabres in 1955 (F-86E and 1957 (F-86H).

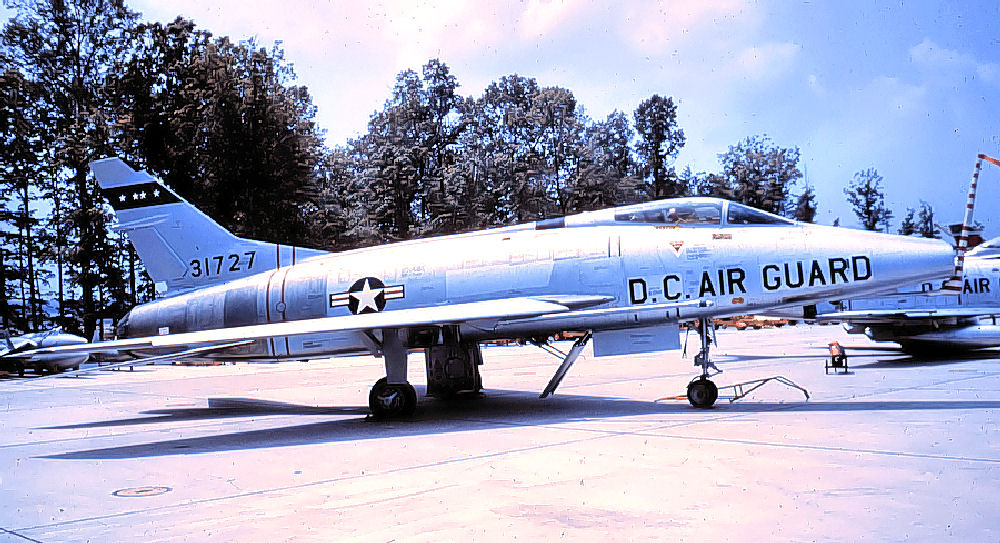
121st Tactical Fighter Squadron F-100 (Note: Aircraft is North American F-100C-1-NA Super Sabre serial 53-1727)

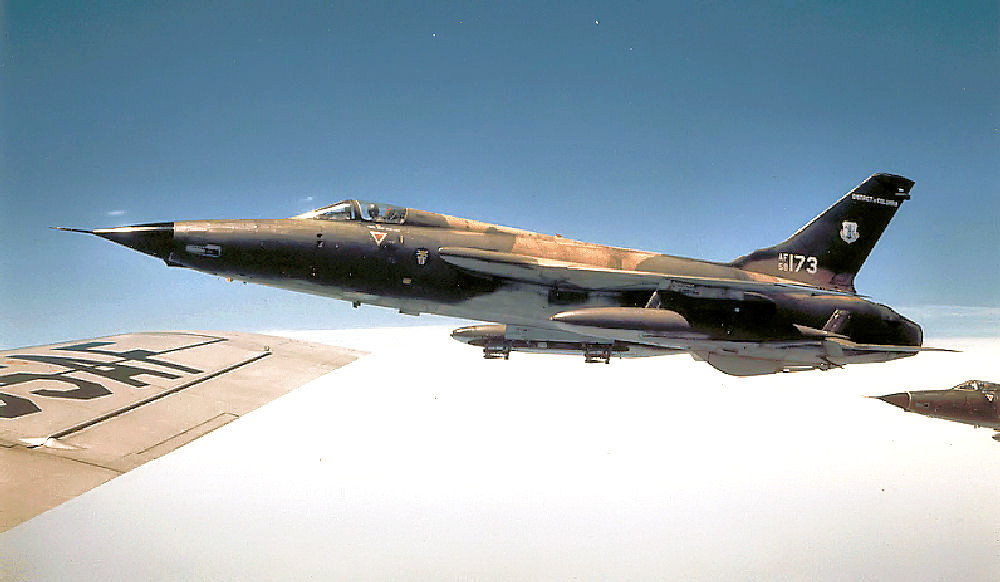
121st Tactical Fighter Squadron F-105 (Note: Aircraft is Republic F-105D Thunderchief serial 58-1173. Taken after an air refueling.)

In late 1958, the gaining command for the 113th was changed from ADC to Tactical Air Command (TAC) and the mission was changed to tactical air support, although air defense remained as a secondary mission. The Sabres were phased out in 1960 with the receipt of relatively new North American F-100C Super Sabres. The Super Sabre brought the group into the supersonic age.

In January 1968 the Pueblo Crisis by North Korean forces brought the callup of the 113th to active duty. The group moved to Myrtle Beach Air Force Base, South Carolina while the 354th Tactical Fighter Wing moved to Kunsan Air Base, South Korea. At Myrtle Beach the group was a paper unit, with its squadron assigned directly to the 113th Wing under the dual deputy organization used by TAC. (Note: Under this plan flying squadrons reported directly to the wing Deputy Commander for Operations and maintenance squadrons reported to the wing Deputy Commander for Maintenance.)

The group returned to Andrews in June 1969, and transitioned into the Republic F-105D Thunderchief, which was beginning to be withdrawn from the active inventory. The 113th was one of four Air National Guard units to receive the F-105, a very large and complex aircraft. The 113th was fortunate to have many Vietnam Veteran airmen in its ranks by 1970, many of whom had F-105 experience. In December 1974, the 113th Tactical Fighter Group was inactivated and its 121st Squadron was assigned directly to the 113th Tactical Fighter Wing.

In the early 1990s the Air Force began implementing the Objective Wing organization, which again called for squadrons to be assigned to functional groups, rather than directly to the wing. As a result, the group was once again activated as the 113th Operations Group.

== Lineage ==
- Constituted as the 352d Fighter Group on 29 September 1942

Activated on 1 October 1942
Inactivated on 10 November 1945
Redesignated 113th Fighter Group and allotted to the National Guard on 24 May 1946
Extended federal recognition on 2 October 1946

- Federalized and ordered to active service on 1 February 1951
- Redesignated: 113th Fighter-Interceptor Group on 10 February 1951

Inactivated on 6 February 1952

- Released from active duty, returned to District of Columbia control and activated on 1 November 1952
- Redesignated: 113th Fighter-Bomber Group on 1 December 1952
- Redesignated: 113th Fighter-Interceptor Group on 1 December 1952
- Redesignated: 113th Fighter-Interceptor Group on 1 July 1955
- Redesignated: 113th Tactical Fighter Group on 1 November 1958

Federalized and ordered to active service on: 26 January 1968
Released from active duty and returned to District of Columbia control on 18 June 1969
Inactivated 9 December 1974

- Redesignated 113th Operations Group

Activated on 1 January 1993

=== Assignments ===
- I Fighter Command, 1 October 1942 – June 1943

Attached to New York Fighter Wing, until November 1942 and after 9 March 1943
Attached to Boston Fighter Wing, November 1942 – 9 March 1943

- VIII Fighter Command, 6 July 1943
- 67th Fighter Wing, 6 October 1943

Attached to 1st Bombardment Division (later 1st Air Division), 15 September 1944 – 13 April 1945
Further attached to: IX Tactical Air Command, 23 December 1944 – 13 April 1945

- Army Service Forces (Port of Embarkation), 9 – 10 November 1945
- District of Columbia National Guard, 2 November 1946
- 53d Fighter Wing, 17 January 1947
- 113th Fighter Wing (later 113th Fighter-Interceptor Wing), 1 November 1950 – 6 February 1952
- 113th Fighter-Interceptor Wing (later 113th Fighter-Bomber Wing, 113th Fighter-Interceptor Wing, 113th Tactical Fighter Wing), 1 November 1952 – 9 December 1974
- 113th Wing, 1 January 1993 – present

=== Components ===
- 104th Fighter Squadron (later 104th Fighter-Interceptor Squadron, 104th Fighter-Bomber Squadron, 104th Tactical Fighter Squadron), 2 November 1946 – 1 February 1951, 1 November 1952 – 15 October 1962
- 121st Fighter Squadron (later 121st Fighter-Interceptor Squadron, 121st Fighter-Bomber Squadron, 121st Tactical Fighter Squadron, 121st Fighter Squadron), 2 November 1946 – 6 February 1952, 1 November 1952 – 26 January 1968, 18 June 1969 – 9 December 1974, 1 January 1993 – present
- 142d Fighter-Interceptor Squadron (later 142d Fighter-Bomber Squadron, 142d Tactical Fighter Squadron), 17 May 1951 – 6 February 1952, 1 November 1952 – c. 1 December 1958
- 146th Fighter Squadron (later 146th Fighter-Interceptor Squadron, 146th Fighter-Bomber Squadron), 1 February 1951 – 6 February 1952, 1 December 1952 – c. June 1953
- 148th Fighter-Interceptor Squadron, 10 February 1951 – 6 February 1952
- 149th Fighter Squadron. See 328th Fighter Squadron
- 201st Airlift Squadron, 1 January 1993 – present
- 328th Fighter Squadron (later 149th Fighter Squadron), 1 October 1942 – 10 November 1945, 26 February 1947 – 1 February 1951
- 486th Fighter Squadron, 1 October 1942 – 10 November 1945
- 487th Fighter Squadron, 1 October 1942 – 10 November 1945

=== Stations ===
- Mitchel Field, New York, 1 October 1942
- Bradley Field, Connecticut, October 1942
- Westover Field, Massachusetts, November 1942
- Trumbull Field, Connecticut, c. 15 January 1943
- Republic Field, New York, C. 9 March–June 1943
- RAF Bodney (Sta 141), England, 7 July 1943
- Chièvres Airfield (A-84, Sta 181), Belgium, c. 27 January 1945
- RAF Bodney (AAF-141), England, c. 14 April – 3 November 1945
- Camp Kilmer, New Jersey, c. 9 – 10 November 1945
- Andrews Field (later Andrews Air Force Base), 20 October 1946
- Newcastle Air Force Base, 16 February 1951 – 6 February 1952
- Andrews Air Force Base, 1 November 1950
- Myrtle Beach Air Force Base, 26 January 1968
- Andrews Air Force Base, 18 June 1969 – 9 December 1974
- Andrews Air Force Base (later Joint Base Andrews), 1 January 1993 – present

=== Aircraft ===
- Republic P-47B Thunderbolt (blocks 5 to 16), c. 13 July 1943 – 20 April 1944.
- North American P-51B Mustang (from blocks 5), 8 April 1944
- North American P-51C Mustang, 1944–1945
- North American P-51D Mustang, 1944–1945
- North American P-51K Mustang, 1944–1945
- Republic F-47D Thunderbolt, 1947–1949
- Republic F-84C Thunderjet, 1949–1951
- Lockheed F-94B Starfire, 1951–1952
- North American F-51H Mustang, 1952–1954
- North American F-86A Sabre, 1954–1955
- North American F-86E Sabre, 1955–1957
- North American F-86H Sabre, 1957–1960
- North American F-86H Sabre, 1957–1960
- North American F-100C Super Sabre, 1960–1971
- North American F-100F Super Sabre, 1960–1971
- Republic F-105D Thunderchief, 1971–1974
- Republic F-105F Thunderchief, 1971–1974
- F-16A Fighting Falcon, 1993–1994
- F-16B Fighting Falcon, 1993–1994
- F-16C Fighting Falcon, 1994–Present
- F-16D Fighting Falcon, 1994–Present
- Gulfstream C-38A Courier, 1998–Present
- Boeing C-40 Clipper, 2004–Present

−
