= 486 Squadron =

486 Squadron or 486th Squadron may refer to:

- No. 486 Squadron RAAF, Australia
- No. 486 Squadron RNZAF, a New Zealand fighter unit of the Royal Air Force that served in Europe during World War II
- 486th Aero Squadron, Air Service, United States Army
- 486th Bombardment Squadron, United States Army Air Forces and United States Air Force
- 486th Fighter Squadron, United States Army Air Forces
- 486th Flight Test Squadron, United States Air Force
