= 4707th Air Defense Wing =

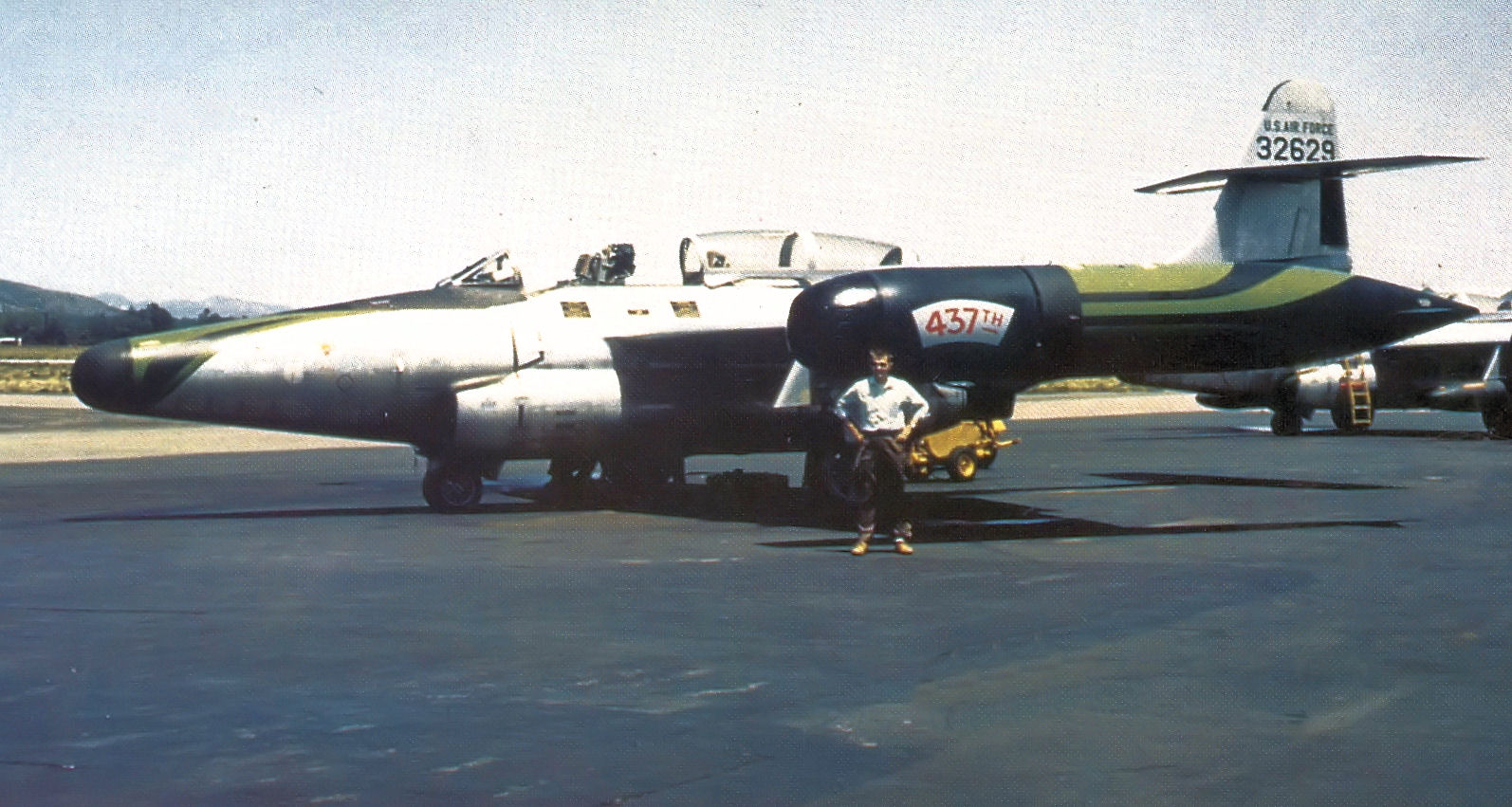
- F-89D Scorpion of the wing's 437th Fighter-Interceptor Squadron
- Active: 1 February 1952 – 18 October 1956
- Country: United States
- Branch: United States Air Force
- Type: Fighter interceptor and radar
- Role: Air defense

The 4707th Air Defense Wing is a discontinued United States Air Force organization. Its last assignment was with the 26th Air Division of Air Defense Command (ADC) at Otis Air Force Base, Massachusetts where it was discontinued in 1956.

The wing was established in 1952 at Otis as the 4707th Defense Wing in a general reorganization of ADC, which replaced wings responsible for a base with wings responsible for a geographical area. It assumed control of several fighter Interceptor squadrons that had been assigned to the 33d Fighter-Interceptor Wing. In early 1953 it also was assigned six radar squadrons in New England, some of which were Air National Guard squadrons mobilized for the Korean War and its dispersed fighter squadrons were combined with colocated air base squadrons into air defense groups. The wing was discontinued in 1956 and its units transferred to other ADC commands, primarily the 33d Fighter Wing for units at Otis and the 26th Air Division for units at other locations.

== History ==
=== Origin ===
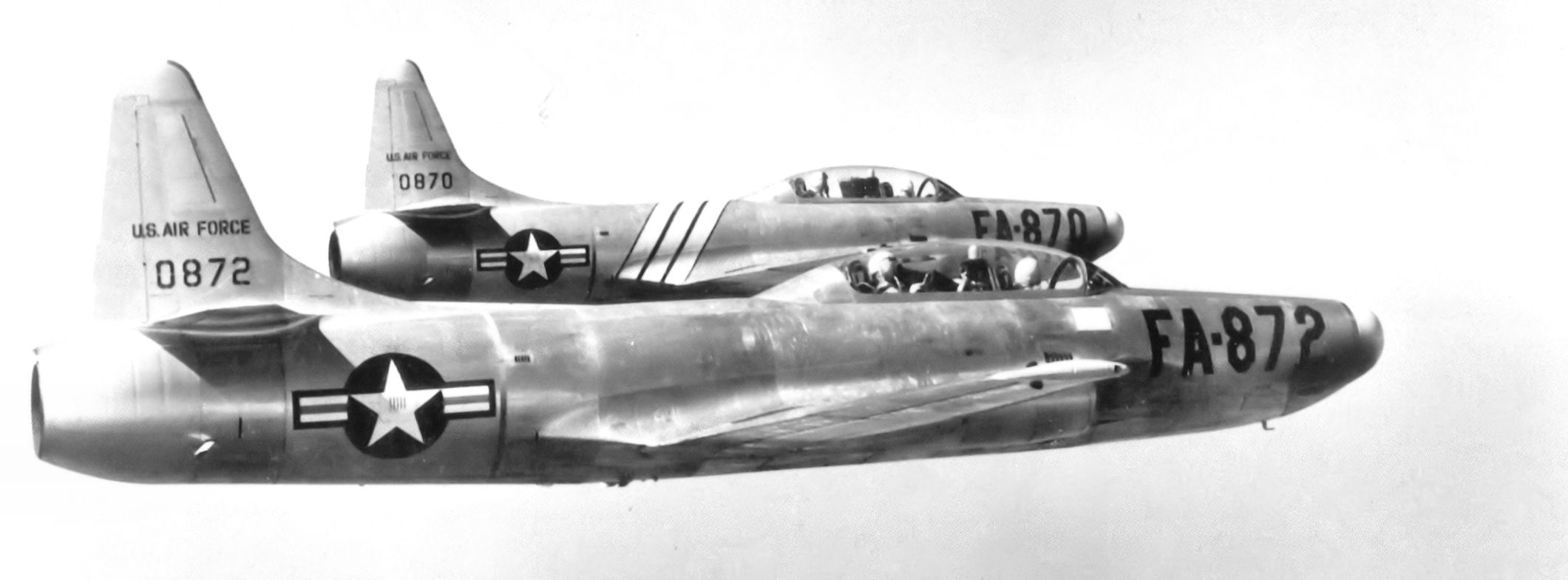
F-94Bs of the wing's 59th FIS

The wing was organized at the beginning of February 1952 as part of a major reorganization of Air Defense Command (ADC) fighter units responding to ADC's difficulty under the existing wing base organizational structure in deploying fighter squadrons to best advantage. The wing replaced the 33d Fighter-Interceptor Wing at Otis Air Force Base, Massachusetts five days later and assumed control of the 33rd's operational elements. The wing's 564th Air Base Group assumed support responsibilities for Otis rom the inactivating 33d Air Base Group and 33d Maintenance & Supply Groups. The operational squadrons transferred from the 33d FIW were the 58th and 59th Fighter-Interceptor Squadrons at Otis and the 60th Fighter-Interceptor Squadron at Westover Air Force Base, Massachusetts. The 58th and 60th FIS flew North American F-86 Sabre aircraft, while the 59th was equipped with Lockheed F-94 Starfire aircraft. The wing also was assigned a federalized Air National Guard (ANG) squadron from the 101st Fighter-Interceptor Wing, the 133d Fighter-Interceptor Squadron at Grenier Air Force Base, New Hampshire, flying World War II era Republic F-47 Thunderbolt aircraft. The wing mission was to train and maintain tactical flying units in state of readiness to defend the northeastern United States.

Shortly after joining the wing, the 58th Squadron converted from F-86 to F-94 aircraft. Although it remained assigned to the wing until February 1953, it moved to Goose Bay Airport, Labrador on 28 October 1952 and was detached from the wing to Northeast Air Command until it was reassigned. In November its place at Otis was taken by the newly activating 437th Fighter-Interceptor Squadron. The same month the 48th Fighter-Interceptor Squadron activated at Grenier to replace the 133rd, which was inactivated and returned to the control of the ANG.

=== 1953–1954 changes ===
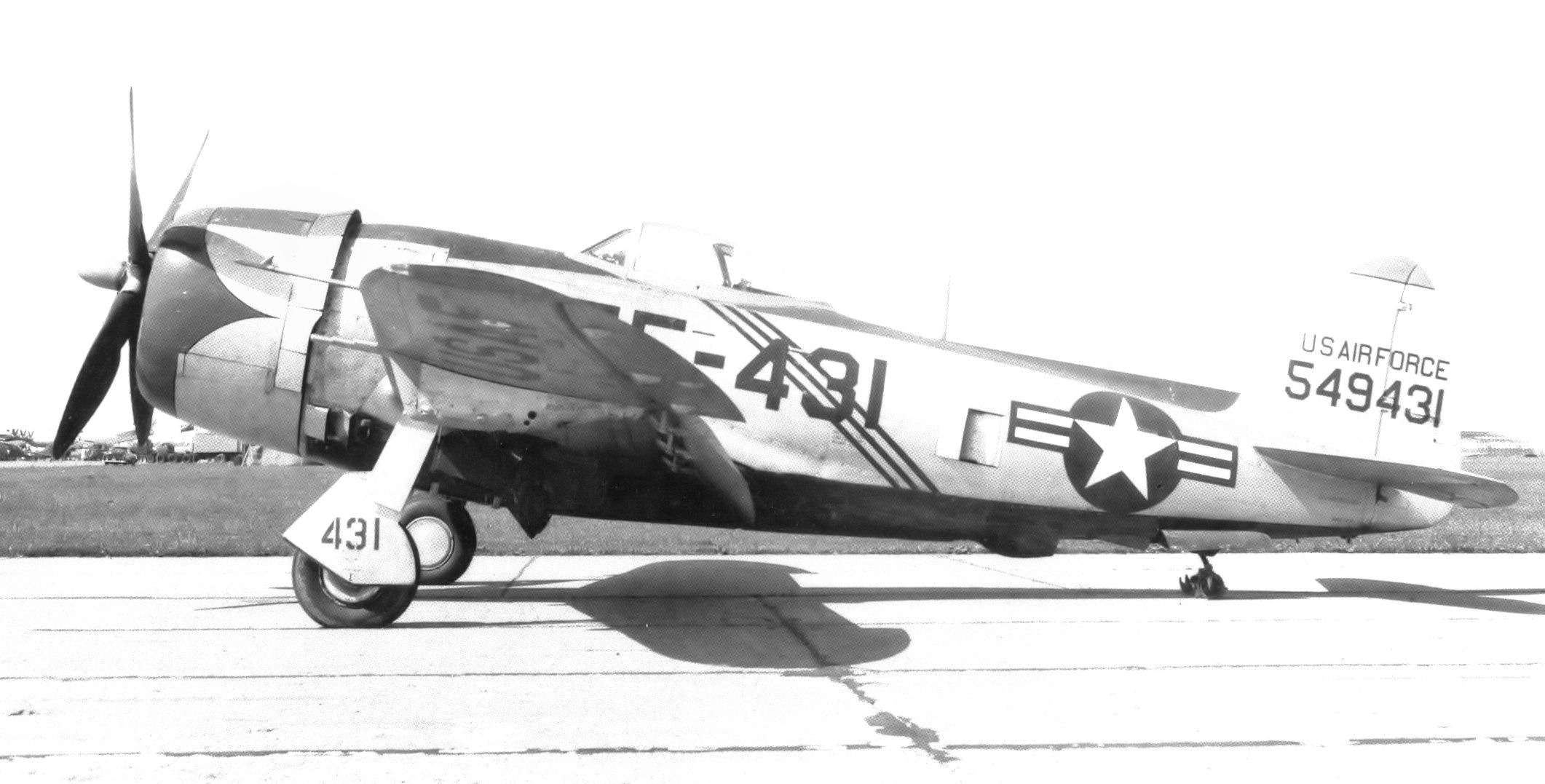
F-47D of the wing's 47th FIS

The wing was reassigned to 32d Air Division as part of a reorganization of Eastern Air Defense Force in February 1953. This reorganization also resulted in the activation of air defense groups at ADC fighter bases, and the new groups assumed direct command of the fighter squadrons at these stations. The 564th Air Base Group redesignated as the 564th Air Defense Group and the 58th Squadron was reassigned to it at Otis, The 518th Air Defense Group activated at Niagara Falls Municipal Airport, New York and was assigned the 47th Fighter-Interceptor Squadron, which had previously been assigned to another wing.

Another result of this reorganization is that the wing assumed the radar detection, warning, and control mission and assigned six aircraft control & warning squadrons (AC&W Sq) to perform this mission. Two of these squadrons, the 113th and 119th AC&W Sqs were federalized ANG squadrons, which were returned to state control in December, while their personnel and equipment were transferred to the 700th AC&W Sq. In the spring of 1953, five new AC&W Sqs were activated at Grenier for transfer to stations in Canada. These squadrons were all reassigned to Northeast Air Command shortly after their activation. The 614th AC&W Sq moved to Georgia and was reassigned later in December.

The wing was assigned an additional air defense group in September 1954 when the 4700th Air Base Group at Stewart Air Force Base, New York was assigned an operational fighter squadron and redesignated the 4700th Air Defense Group. The 4707th was also assigned an additional radar unit two months later.

=== Project Arrow and replacement ===
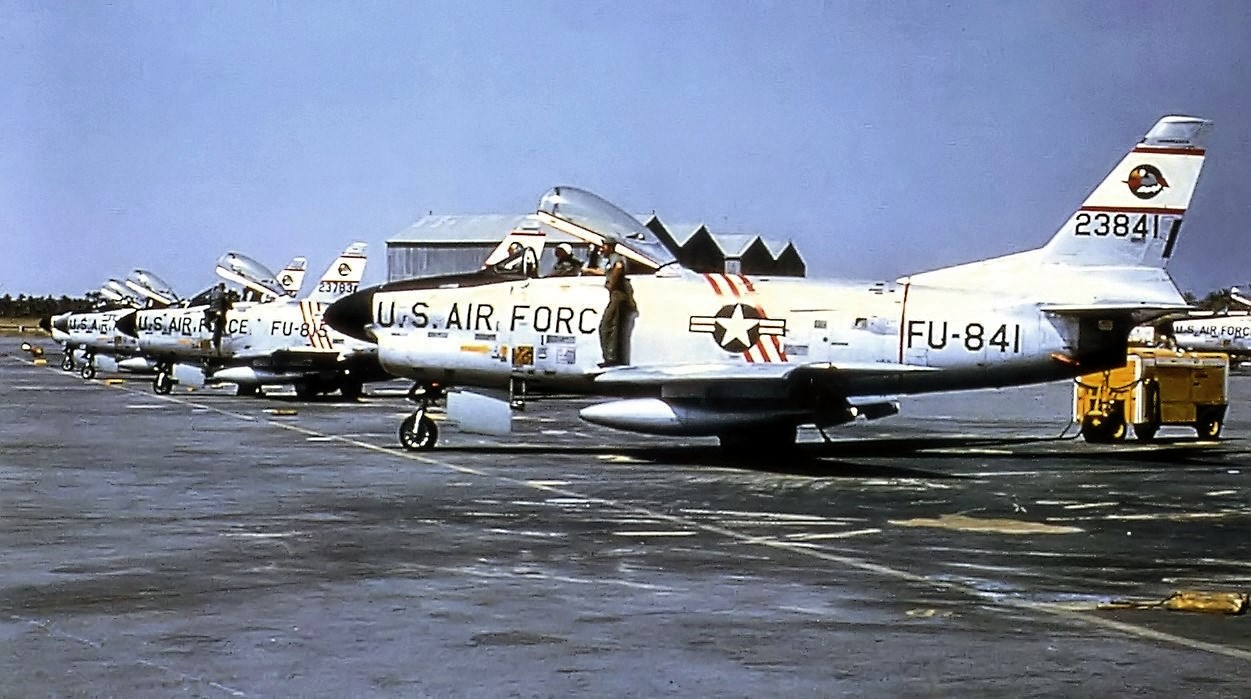
F-86Ds of the wing's 324th FIS

In 1955, ADC implemented Project Arrow, which was designed to bring back on the active list the fighter units which had compiled memorable records in the two world wars. As a result of Project Arrow, the 15th Fighter Group (Air Defense) replaced the 518th Air Defense Group at Niagara Falls, the 33d Fighter Group (Air Defense) replaced the 564th Air Defense Group at Otis. The 4700th Air Defense Group at Stewart was replaced by the 329th Fighter Group (Air Defense), although the 329th group was assigned to another wing until mid-1956 due to shifting areas of air defense responsibility.

Because Project Arrow called for fighter squadrons to be assigned to their traditional group headquarters, the 60th Squadron at Westover returned to Otis and was replaced at Westover by the 337th Fighter-Interceptor Squadron, which took over its personnel and aircraft. Later in 1955, the wing assumed command of two other fighter squadrons, the 49th Fighter-Interceptor Squadron at Laurence G. Hanscom Airport, Massachusetts, and the 324th Fighter-Interceptor Squadron, which activated at Westover. Both squadrons flew F-86D aircraft.

The wing was reassigned to the 26th Air Division in March 1956 when the 26th Air Division region of responsibility was extended, resulting in reassignment of radar and interceptor aircraft units as well. Shortly thereafter, ADC reactivated fighter wings at its large installations and the 4707th was discontinued later that year with its equipment and personnel being reassigned to the unit it had originally replaced, now designated the 33d Fighter Wing (Air Defense).

== Lineage ==
- Designated as the 4707th Defense Wing and organized on 1 February 1952

Redesignated 4707th Air Defense Wing on 1 September 1954
Discontinued on 18 October 1956

=== Assignments ===
- Eastern Air Defense Force, 1 February 1952
- 32d Air Division, 16 February 1953
- 26th Air Division, 1 March – 18 October 1956

=== Components ===
==== Groups ====
Fighter groups

- 15th Fighter Group (Air Defense), 18 August 1955 – 1 March 1956 (Note: If no station is given, units were at Otis Air Force Base..)

Niagara Falls Airport, New York

- 33d Fighter Group (Air Defense), 18 August 1955 – 18 October 1956
- 52d Fighter Group (Air Defense), New York, 1 March 1956 – 8 July 1956

Suffolk County Air Force Base

- 329th Fighter Group (Air Defense), 8 July 1956 – 18 October 1956

Stewart Air Force Base, New York

Air defense groups

- 518th Air Defense Group, 16 February 1953 – 18 August 1955

Niagara Falls Airport, New York

- 564th Air Base Group (later 564th Air Defense Group), 1 February 1952 – 18 August 1955
- 4700th Air Defense Group, 20 September 1954 – 18 August 1955

Stewart Air Force Base, New York, 20 September 1954 – 18 August 1955

==== Squadrons ====
===== Fighter squadrons =====
- 47th Fighter-Interceptor Squadron, New York, 1 December 1952 – 16 February 1953

Niagara Falls Municipal Airport

- 48th Fighter-Interceptor Squadron, 1 November 1952 – 14 January 1953

Grenier Air Force Base, New Hampshire

- 49th Fighter-Interceptor Squadron, 15 November 1955 – 16 June 1956

Laurence G. Hanscom Airport, Massachusetts

- 58th Fighter-Interceptor Squadron, 6 February 1952 – 16 February 1953
- 59th Fighter-Interceptor Squadron, 6 February 1952 – 1 February 1953
- 60th Fighter-Interceptor Squadron, 6 February 1952 – 18 August 1955

Westover Air Force Base, Massachusetts

- 133d Fighter-Interceptor Squadron, 6 February 1952 – 1 November 1952

Grenier Air Force Base, New Hampshire

- 324th Fighter-Interceptor Squadron, 18 October 1955 – 18 October 1956

Westover Air Force Base, Massachusetts

- 337th Fighter-Interceptor Squadron, 18 August 1955 – 18 October 195

Westover Air Force Base, Massachusetts

- 437th Fighter-Interceptor Squadron, 27 November 1952 – 16 February 1953

===== Support squadrons =====
- 76th Air Base Squadron, 1 February 1952 – 18 February 1953

Niagara Falls Municipal Airport, New York

- 4681st Air Base Squadron, 1 February 1952 – 16 February 1953

Grenier Air Force Base, New Hampshire

===== Radar squadrons =====
- 113th Aircraft Control & Warning Squadron, 16 February 1953 – 1 December 1953

Grenier Air Force Base, New Hampshire

- 119th Aircraft Control & Warning Squadron, 16 February 1953 – 1 December 1953
- 614th Aircraft Control & Warning Squadron, 16 February 1953 – 24 December 1953

Grenier Air Force Base, New Hampshire

- 644th Aircraft Control & Warning Squadron, 1 October 1954 – 18 October 1956

Syracuse Air Force Station until July 1955, then Portsmouth (later Rye Air Force Station), New Hampshire

- 648th Aircraft Control & Warning Squadron, 8 July 1956 – 18 October 1956

Benton Air Force Station, Pennsylvania

- 654th Aircraft Control & Warning Squadron, 16 February 1953 – 1 March 1956

Brunswick Naval Air Station, Maine

- 656th Aircraft Control & Warning Squadron, 16 February 1953 – 18 October 1956

Schuylerville (later Saratoga Springs Air Force Station), New York

- 700th Aircraft Control & Warning Squadron, 1 December 1953 – 1 May 1954

Grenier Air Force Base, New Hampshire

- 762d Aircraft Control & Warning Squadron, 16 February 1953 – 18 October 1956

North Truro Air Force Station, Massachusetts

- 763d Aircraft Control & Warning Squadron, 16 February 1953 – 1 July 1956

Shawnee (later Lockport Air Force Station), New York

- 773d Aircraft Control & Warning Squadron, 1 March 1956 – 18 October 1956

Montauk Air Force Station, New York

- 921st Aircraft Control & Warning Squadron, 26 May 1953 – 1 October 1953

Grenier Air Force Base

- 922d Aircraft Control & Warning Squadron, 26 May 1953 – 1 October 1953

Grenier Air Force Base

- 923d Aircraft Control & Warning Squadron, 13 June 1953 – 1 November 1953

Grenier Air Force Base

- 924th Aircraft Control & Warning Squadron, 13 June 1953 – 1 December 1953

Grenier Air Force Base

- 926th Aircraft Control & Warning Squadron, 13 June 1953 – 1 December 1953

Grenier Air Force Base

=== Stations ===
- Otis Air Force Base, Massachusetts, 6 February 1952 – 18 October 1956

=== Aircraft ===
- F-47D, 1952–1953
- F-80C, 1952–1953
- F-86A, 1952
- F-86D, 1953–1956
- F-86E, 1952–1953
- F-89D, 1955–1956
- F-89H, 1956
- F-94B, 1952–1953
- F-94C, 1953–1955

== See also ==
- List of MAJCOM wings
- List of United States Air Force Aerospace Defense Command Interceptor Squadrons
- List of United States Air Force aircraft control and warning squadrons
