= 564th Air Defense Group =

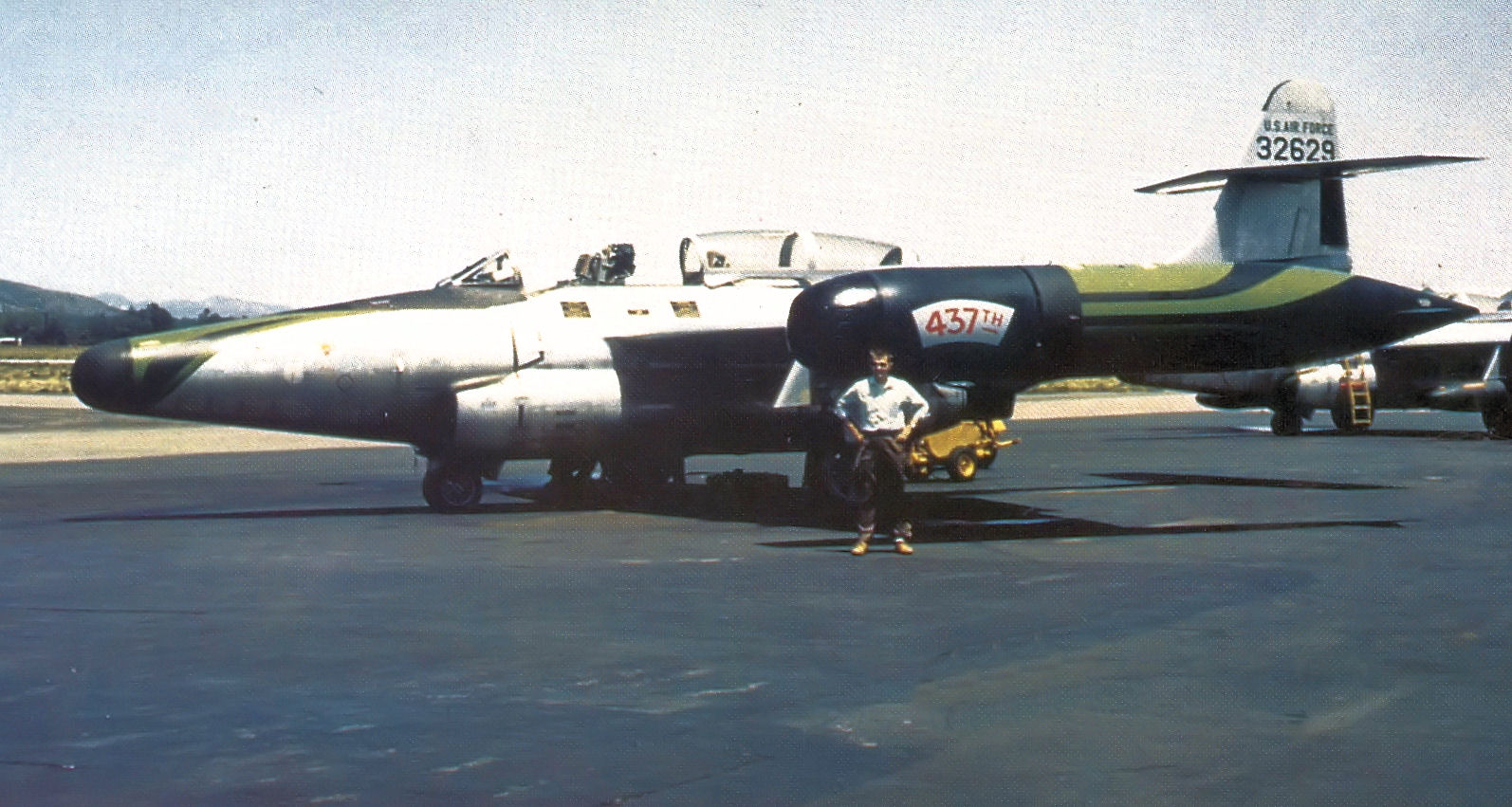
- F-89D Scorpion of the group's 437th Fighter-Interceptor Squadron in 1955 (Note: Aircraft is Northrop F-89D-65-NO, serial 53-2629. This plane was later converted to an F-89J. To the Air National Guard in 1958. Transferred to Military Aircraft Storage and Disposition Center (MASDC) on 25 March 1965, salvaged on 5 April, 1965. Baugher, Joe (2 April 2023). "1953 USAF Serial Numbers". Joe Baugher.)
- Active: 1944–1945; 1952–1955
- Country: United States
- Branch: United States Air Force
- Type: Fighter interceptor
- Role: Air defense

Commanders
- Notable commanders: Major General Luther H. Richmond (1953–1955)

The 564th Air Defense Group is a disbanded United States Air Force organization. Its last assignment was with the 4707th Air Defense Wing, at Otis Air Force Base, Massachusetts, where it was inactivated in 1955. The group was originally activated as the 564th Air Service Group, a support unit for a combat group at the end of World War II but never deployed before it was inactivated in 1945.

The group was activated once again in 1952 as the 564th Air Base Group to replace the support elements of the inactivating 33d Fighter-Interceptor Wing. A year later Air Defense Command (ADC) established it as an operational headquarters for fighter-interceptor squadrons as well. It was replaced in 1955 when ADC transferred its mission, equipment, and personnel to the 33d Fighter Group in a project that replaced air defense groups commanding fighter squadrons with fighter groups with distinguished records during World War II.

== History ==
=== World War II ===
The group was activated during World War II at Stinson Field, Texas as the 564th Air Service Group in 1944 and trained to support a single combat group in an overseas theater. Its 995th Air Engineering Squadron would provide maintenance that was beyond the capability of the combat group, its 1002nd Air Materiel Squadron would handle all supply matters, and its Headquarters & Base Services Squadron would provide other support. The group was inactivated before it could be deployed overseas. It was disbanded in 1948.

=== Cold War ===
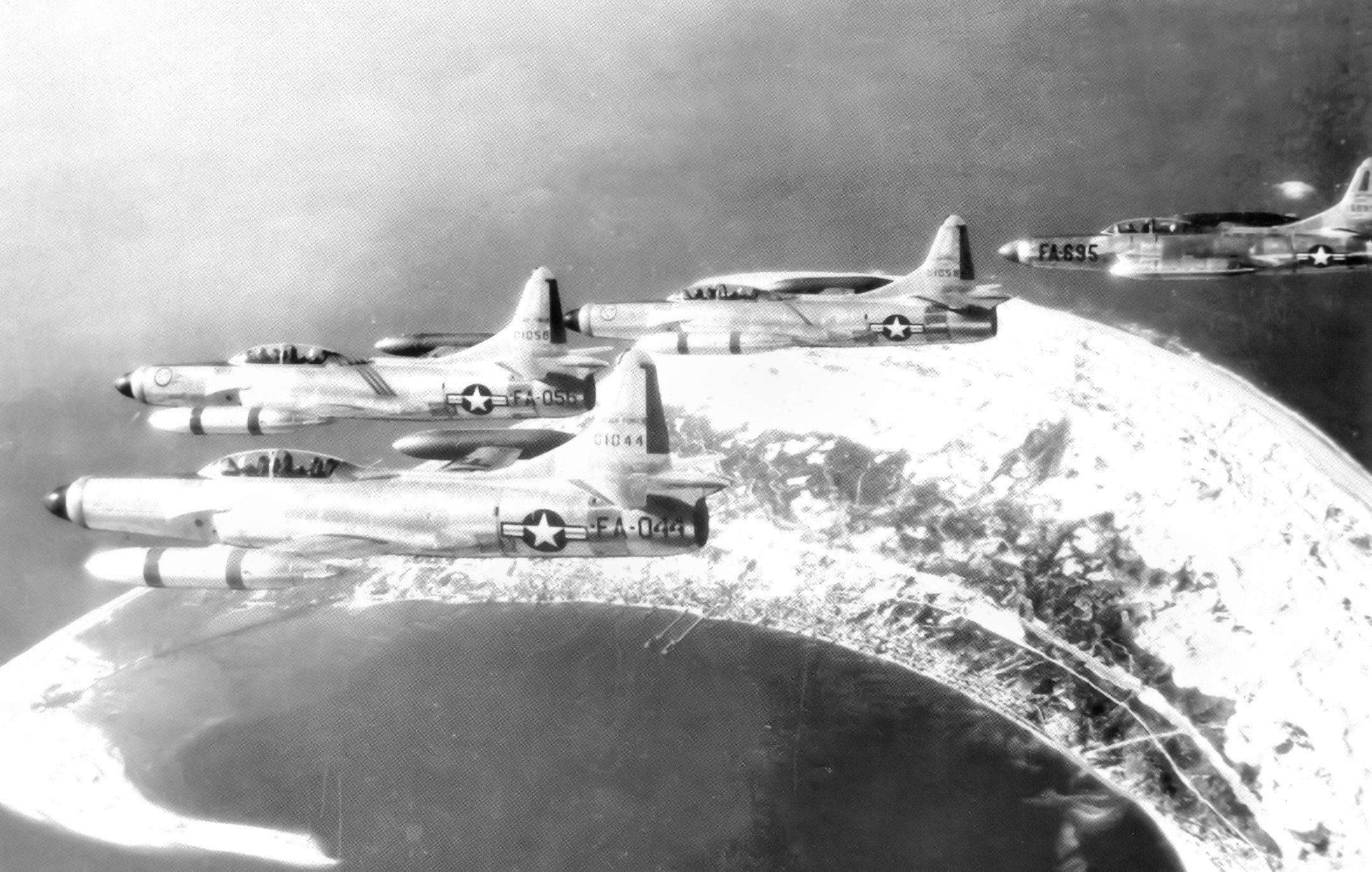
437th Fighter-Interceptor Squadron F-94s over Cape Cod 1953 (Note: Aircraft are Lockheed F-94C-1-LO Starfires, serials 50-1044, 50-1056 (transferred to the MASDC on 3 May 1958, salvaged on 1 July 1958), 50-1058 (transferred to the MASDC on 6 June 1958, salvaged on 1 July 1958), and 51-5698 (transferred to the MASDC on 22 May 1958, salvaged on 27 May 1958). Baugher, Joe (7 April 2023). "1950 USAF Serial Numbers". Joe Baugher., Baugher, Joe (8 April 2023). "1951 USAF Serial Numbers". Joe Baugher.)

During the Cold War the group was reconstituted, redesignated as the 564th Air Base Group, and activated at Otis Air Force Base, Massachusetts in 1952 in a major reorganization of Air Defense Command (ADC) responding to ADC's difficulty under the existing wing base organizational structure in deploying fighter squadrons to best advantage. It replaced the 33rd Air Base Group as USAF host unit for Otis. The group was assigned eight squadrons to perform its support responsibilities. It also assumed aircraft maintenance responsibility from the 33d Maintenance & Supply Group for units stationed at Otis. The operational elements of the inactivating 33d Fighter-Interceptor Wing were assigned to the 4707th Defense Wing.

In 1953 the group was redesignated the 564th Air Defense Group and assumed responsibility for air defense of the Boston area. It was assigned the 58th Fighter-Interceptor Squadron (FIS), flying Lockheed F-94 Starfire aircraft equipped with air intercept radar and armed with cannon, from the 4707th Defense Wing as its operational element. The 58th FIS was already stationed at Otis. In April 1953, the 437th Fighter-Interceptor Squadron, flying a newer model of the F-94 aircraft armed with Mighty Mouse rockets, was activated as a second operational squadron. The 58th FIS upgraded to the newer F-94s by June 1953 and both squadrons converted to Northrop F-89 Scorpion aircraft in June 1955. The group was inactivated and replaced by the 33d Fighter Group (Air Defense) on 18 August 1955 as result of ADC's Project Arrow, which was designed to bring back on the active list the fighter units which had compiled memorable records in the two world wars. The group was disbanded once again in 1984.

== Lineage ==
- Constituted as the 564th Air Service Group in 1944

Activated on 5 December 1944
Inactivated on 30 June 1945
Disbanded on 8 October 1948

- Reconstituted and redesignated 564th Air Base Group on 1 January 1952

Activated on 1 February 1952
Redesignated 564th Air Defense Group on 16 February 1953
Inactivated on 18 August 1955

- Disbanded on 27 September 1984

=== Assignments ===
- San Antonio Air Technical Service Command, 5 December 1944 – 30 June 1945
- 4707th Defense Wing (later 4707th Air Defense Wing), 1 February 1952 – 18 August 1955

=== Stations ===
- Stinson Field, Texas, 5 December 1944 – 30 June 1945
- Otis Air Force Base, Massachusetts, 1 February 1952 – 18 August 1955

=== Components ===
==== Operational Squadrons ====
- 58th Fighter-Interceptor Squadron, 16 February 1953 – 18 August 1955
- 437th Fighter-Interceptor Squadron, 27 April 1953 – 18 August 1955

==== Support Squadrons ====
- 12th WAF (Women's Air Force) Squadron, c. 1 July 1952 – 8 September 1954
- 564th Air Police Squadron, 1 February 1952 – 18 August 1955
- 564th Food Service Squadron, 1 February 1952 – 18 August 1955
- 564th Field Maintenance Squadron, 1 February 1952 – 18 August 1955
- 564th Installations Squadron, 1 February 1952 – 18 August 1955
- 564th Medical Squadron (later 564th USAF Hospital), 16 February 1953 – 18 August 1955
- 564th Motor Vehicle Squadron, 1 February 1952 – 18 August 1955
- 564th Operations Squadron, 1 February 1952 – 18 August 1955
- 564th Supply Squadron, 1 February 1952 – 18 August 1955
- 995th Air Engineering Squadron, 5 December 1944 – 30 June 1945
- 1002nd Air Materiel Squadron, 5 December 1944 – 30 June 1945
- 4651st WAF (Women's Air Force) Squadron 1 February 1952 – c. 1 July 1952

=== Aircraft ===
- Northrop F-89D Scorpion, 1955
- Lockheed F-94B Starfighter, 1953
- Lockheed F-94C Starfighter, 1953–1955

=== Commanders ===
- Unknown, 5 December 1944 – 9 December 1944
- Maj. Joseph D. Clemens, 9 December 1944 – 11 December 1944
- Lt Col. Lawrence L. Martin, 11 December 1944 – 12 December 1944
- Lt Col. Clifford R. Rassmussen, 12 December 1944 – 6 March 1945
- Lt Col. Hugh H. Master, 6 March 1945 – 30 June 1945
- Unknown, 1952 – 1953
- Col. Luther H. Richmond, 1953 – 18 August 1955

== See also ==
- Aerospace Defense Command Fighter Squadrons
- F-89 Scorpion units of the United States Air Force
- F-94 Starfire units of the United States Air Force
