= Luther H. Richmond =

American air force major general and fighter pilot (1915-2003)

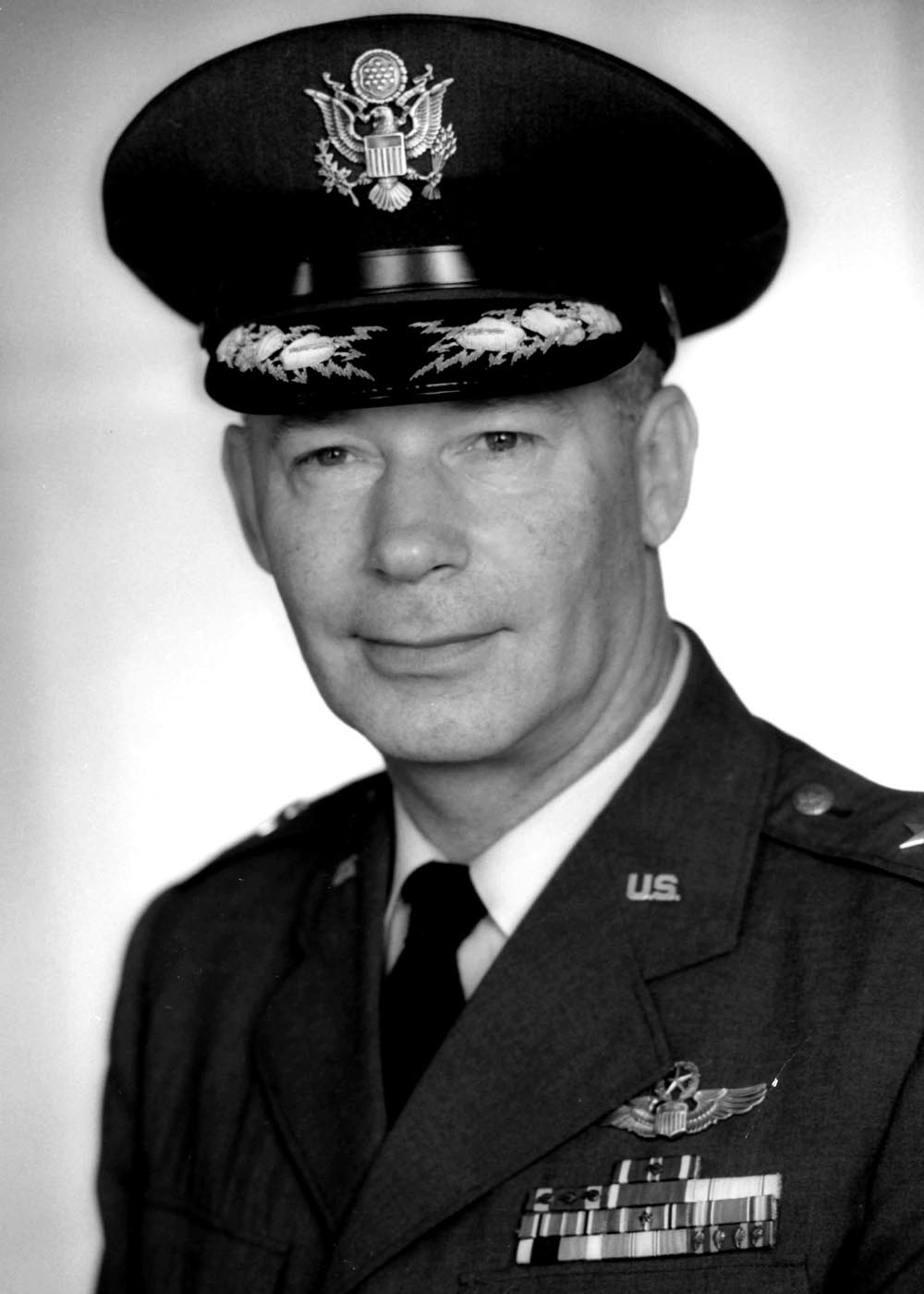
- Born: December 13, 1915; Chicopee, Massachusetts, U.S.
- Died: June 27, 2003 (aged 87); Tampa, Florida, U.S.
- Burial place: Arlington National Cemetery
- Military career
- Allegiance: United States
- Branch: United States Army Air Corps; United States Army Air Forces; United States Air Force
- Service years: 1938–1970
- Rank: Major General
- Units: 486th Fighter Squadron, 352nd Fighter Group
- Commands: 2nd Training Group; 486th Fighter Squadron; 8th Fighter Group; 564th Air Defense Group; Otis Air Force Base; Seventeenth Air Force; Nineteenth Air Force
- Conflicts: World War II
- Awards: Air Force Distinguished Service Medal; Legion of Merit (2); Distinguished Flying Cross (2); Purple Heart; Air Medal (4)

Luther Henry Richmond (December 13, 1915 – June 27, 2003) was an American Air Force major general and a World War II fighter pilot. During World War II, he flew P-51 Mustangs and P-47 Thunderbolts with the 486th Fighter Squadron in Europe before being shot down in 1944 and captured as a prisoner of war until the end of World War II.

== Early life ==
Born in Chicopee, Massachusetts, in 1915, Richmond completed his education at Springfield Technical High School in Springfield, Massachusetts, in 1933. He later earned his degree in economics from American International College in 1938.

== Military career ==
In July 1938, Richmond joined the United States Army Air Corps aviation cadet program. After graduating the following year, he received his wings and commission as a second lieutenant. His first posting was as a flight instructor at Randolph Field, Texas. In 1941, he was transferred to Foster Field, Texas, where he served first as a training group commander and later as director of flying training.

=== World War II ===
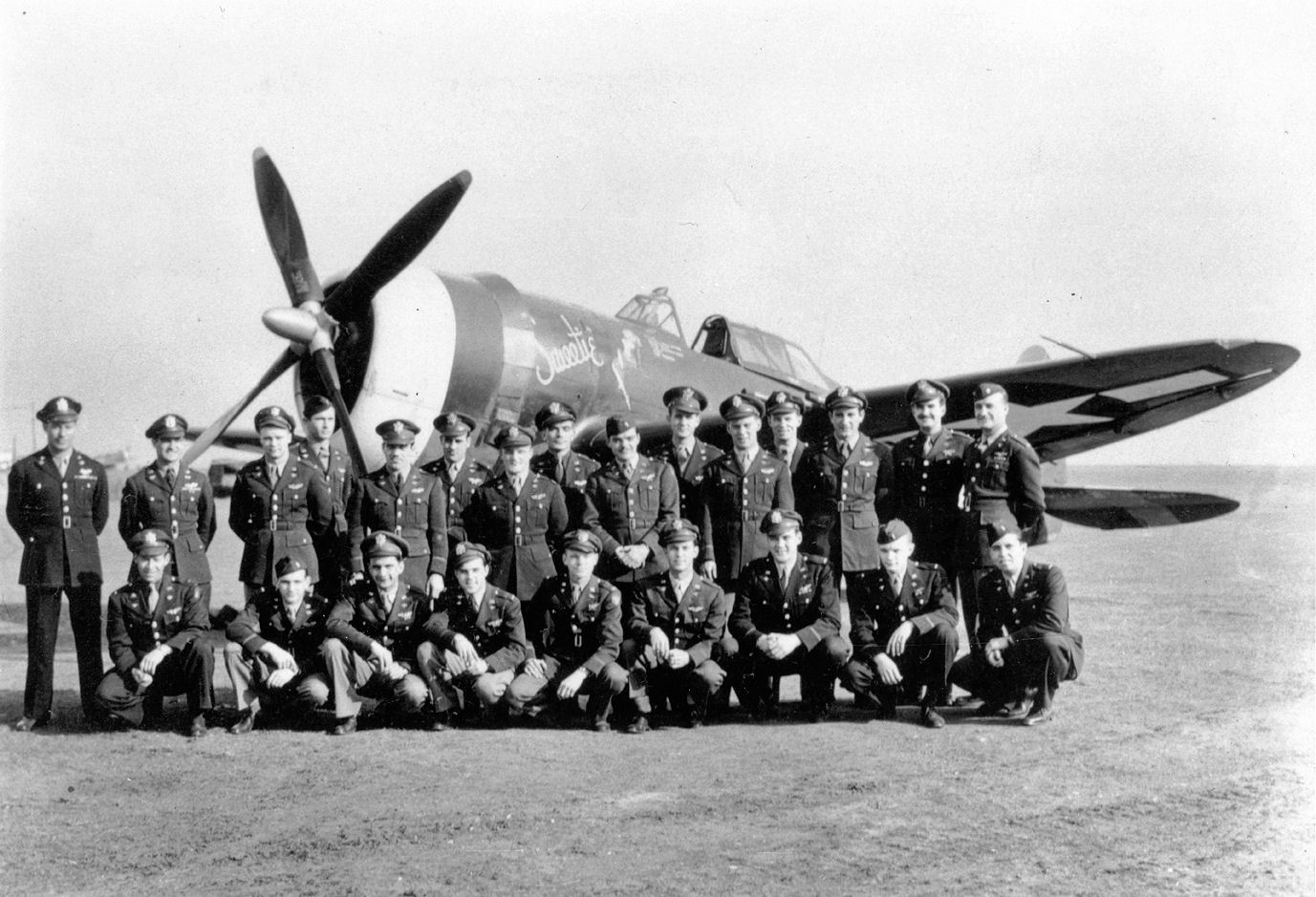
Members of the 486th Fighter Squadron alongside a P-47 Thunderbolt. Richmond is standing far left in the middle row.

In March 1943, Richmond took command of the 486th Fighter Squadron of the 352nd Fighter Group in Farmingdale, New York, which was equipped with P-47 Thunderbolts, after its previous commander disappeared during a short flight. By July, he and his squadron were deployed to England and was assigned to support the Eighth Air Force over Europe. Flying P-47s in combat missions, he also served as temporary group commander of the 359th Fighter Group. In April 1944, the 352nd Fighter Group converted to P-51 Mustangs and after receiving his P-51, Richmond deliberately kept his P-51 in its shiny silver finish instead of using camouflage, believing it would help attract enemy fighters—a tactic born from growing frustration with the squadron's repeated difficulties in engaging in aerial combat against enemy fighters during missions.

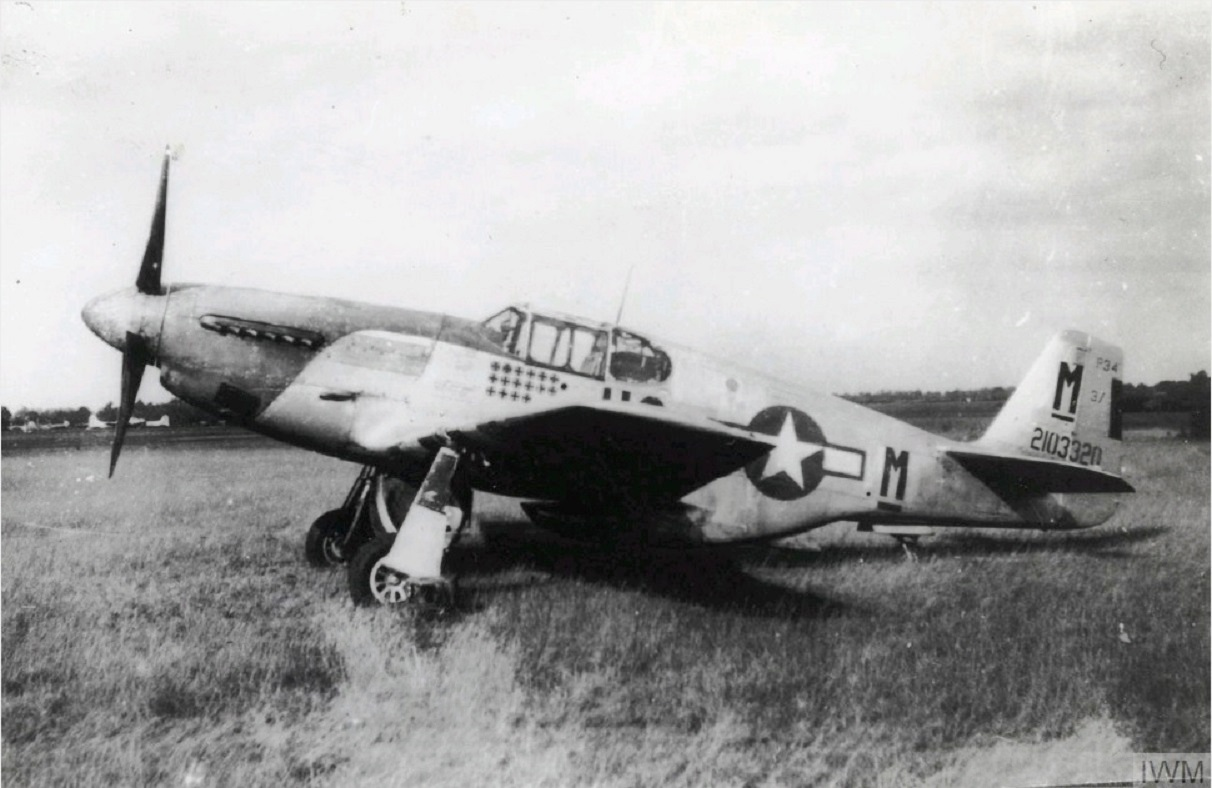
P-51B Mustang of the 352nd FG similar to the one flown by Richmond on his 67th mission

On April 15, Richmond was part of a fighter mission to strafe German fighter airfields, with 352nd FG assigned to strafe three airfields in northern Germany. This was his 67th combat mission and Richmond's flight was tasked in attacking an airfield in Vechta, Germany. As his flight approached the airfield and prepared for strafing run, they noticed a group of 12 Focke-Wulf Fw 190s circling over the airfield. The Fw 190s did not notice Richmond's flight as the Fw 190s were at 500 feet while Richmond's flight was at treetop level. Despite Richmond calling on his flight to abandon strafing run and instead engage the airborne Fw 190s, the flight continued to strafe and destroy Fw 190s on the airfield. Richmond then shot down a Fw 190 which was witnessed by his wingmen, which would be his first and only aerial victory. While attempting to regroup with his flight, he noticed another Fw 190 attempting to flee at low level. While chasing the Fw 190, a German flak gun opened fire on Richmond's P-51. Instead of taking evasive maneuver to avoid the flak, he targeted and fired at the flak gun. However, the flak gun successfully shot at Richmond's P-51 and as result, he was forced to bail out of his stricken P-51. After landing on the ground, he was apprehended by German soldiers and was imprisoned at Stalag Luft I where most of captured American fighter group commanders and flying aces were held at. He was held there until May 1945, when the prison camp was liberated by the soldiers of the Soviet Red Army's 1st Ukrainian Front.

=== Post war ===
Following Richmond's return to the United States in August 1945, Richmond was appointed Base Director of Operations at Selfridge Field, Michigan, where he oversaw flight training for French Air Force cadets. By July 1946, he took command of the 8th Fighter Group in Ashiya Air Field, Japan, a role he held until 1947 when he became Assistant Deputy Chief of Staff for Operations at Fifth Air Force Headquarters in Nagoya, Japan.

In 1949, Richmond transferred to the Directorate of Plans at U.S. Air Force Headquarters in Washington, D.C. During his final three years there, he served as Executive Officer to the Deputy Chief of Staff for Operations, working under future Air Force Chief of Staff General Thomas D. White. After departing Washington, D.C. in 1953, he assumed command of the 564th Air Defense Group and Otis Air Force Base in Massachusetts. Two years later, he was assigned to West Germany to establish and lead the Air Force Section of the Military Assistance Advisory Group in Bonn as its inaugural chief. Upon his 1958 return to the U.S., he enrolled at the National War College. Post-graduation, he rejoined Air Force Headquarters as Chief of the Combined Plans Division and later Deputy Director of Plans for War Plans, earning the Legion of Merit for his contributions.

In July 1963, Richmond was assigned to the Plans and Policy Division at Supreme Headquarters Allied Powers Europe (SHAPE) in Paris. Shortly after, in August, he relocated to Wiesbaden, West Germany, serving as Inspector General for U.S. Air Forces in Europe (USAFE) before becoming Deputy Chief of Staff for Operations in April 1965. That November, he was named Vice Commander of the Seventeenth Air Force at Ramstein Air Base in West Germany, receiving a second Legion of Merit for his service in USAFE. In August 1966, he was appointed as commander of the Nineteenth Air Force and in March 1967, he was assigned as Director of Plans (J-5) with the United States Strike Command (USSTRICOM) at MacDill Air Force Base, Florida. He retired from the Air Force in 1970.

A command pilot with over 6,000 flight hours, the majority of Richmond's flying career was spent piloting combat aircraft including the P-40 Warhawk, P-47 Thunderbolt, P-51 Mustang, and F-94C Starfire.

== Later life ==
Richmond was married twice, and had two sons and one daughter from his first marriage. After his retirement from the Air Force, he settled in Tampa, Florida and was an active member with the 352nd Fighter Group Association. He died of cancer at the age of 87, and was buried at Arlington National Cemetery.

== Awards and decorations ==
Richmond's military decorations and awards include:

Command pilot badge
Air Force Distinguished Service Medal
Legion of Merit with bronze oak leaf cluster
Distinguished Flying Cross with bronze oak leaf cluster
Purple Heart
Air Medal with three bronze oak leaf clusters
Prisoner of War Medal
American Defense Service Medal
American Campaign Medal
European-African-Middle Eastern Campaign Medal with bronze campaign star
World War II Victory Medal
Army of Occupation Medal with 'Japan' clasp
National Defense Service Medal with service star
Air Force Longevity Service Award with one silver and two bronze oak leaf clusters

== Bibliography ==
- Fogg, Howard; Fogg, Janet (2011). Fogg in the Cockpit: Howard Fogg-Master Railroad Artist, World War II Fighter Pilot (Hardcover). Casemate Publishers. ISBN 9781612000152.
- Ivie, Thomas (2002). 352nd Fighter Group (Hardcover). Osprey Publishing. ASIN B00QCL62YO.
- McFarland, Stephen L.; Newton, Wesley. (2006). To Command the Sky: The Battle for Air Superiority Over Germany, 1942-1944 (Hardcover). University of Alabama. ISBN 9780817353469.
