= 437th Fighter-Interceptor Squadron =

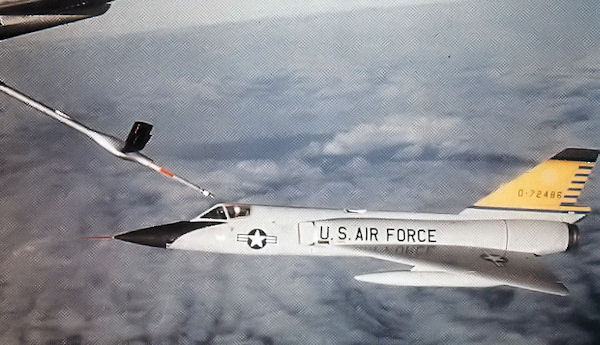
- F-106A Delta Dart of the 437th Fighter-Interceptor Squadron refueling from a SAC KC-135 (Note: Aircraft is Convair F-106A-90-CO Delta Dart, serial 57-2486, taken in September 1968. This aircraft was lost on 14 December 1972. There seems to be no documentation that shows the 437th had its own distinctive F-106 tail flash markings. Its tail colors were carried over from the 456th Fighter-Interceptor Squadron, and became the first markings of the 460th Fighter-Interceptor Squadron.)
- Active: 1944–1946; 1952–1968; 1968
- Country: United States
- Branch: United States Air Force
- Role: Fighter-Interceptor
- Nickname(s): Fighting 437th
- Engagements: Pacific Theater of Operations
- Decorations: Air Force Outstanding Unit Award

Insignia
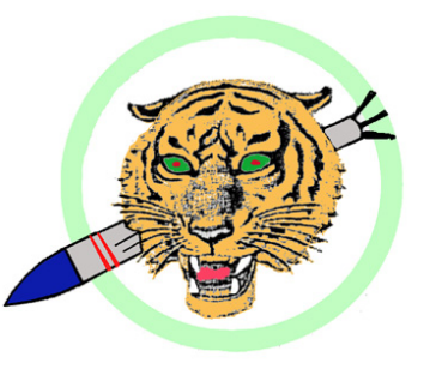
- 437th Fighter-Interceptor Squadron emblem (Note: Approved 1 September 1953.)

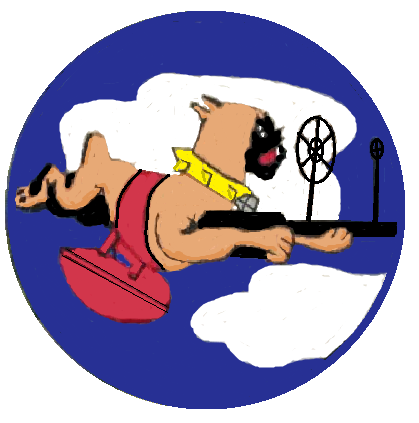
- 437th Fighter Squadron emblem (Note: Approved 7 March 1945.)

The 437th Fighter-Interceptor Squadron is an inactive United States Air Force unit. Its last assignment was with 414th Fighter Group at Oxnard Air Force Base, California, where it was inactivated on 30 September 1969.

The squadron was first activated during World War II as the 437th Fighter Squadron, a very long range fighter escort squadron. It deployed to the Pacific Ocean Theater a month before the Japanese surrender in August 1945, and flew several escort and fighter sweep missions over Japan before the end of the war. It moved to the Philippines after the war ended and was inactivated there in 1946.

It was activated at Otis Air Force Base, Massachusetts in 1952 as the 437th Fighter-Interceptor Squadron. It moved to California in 1955 and served there until the spring of 1968. it was briefly activate in 1968, but was discontinued and transferred its personnel and equipment to another unit in September 1968.

== History ==
=== World War II ===
The squadron was constituted in late 1944 at Seymour Johnson Field, North Carolina as the 437th Fighter Squadron, one of the three original squadrons of the 414th Fighter Group. The 414th was a very long range Republic P-47N Thunderbolt fighter group that trained under I Fighter Command at Selfridge Field, Michigan and Bluethenthal Field, North Carolina.

The squadron deployed by ship to Iwo Jima in the Pacific Ocean Theater where it became part of Twentieth Air Force as a long-range escort squadron for Boeing B-29 Superfortress bombers engaged in strategic bombing campaign against Japan. The extreme length of these escort missions stretched the fuel capacity of the squadron's Thunderbolts. Lt. Robert Dunnavant, piloting a squadron P-47N, spent the astonishing period of 8 hours and 45 minutes in the air. His aircraft's fuel tanks were so depleted when he eventually reached Iwo Jima, that he dared not try to reach his base at North Field, landing instead at a small US Navy airstrip he located on the coast.

After the Japanese surrender the squadron moved to Luzon where it was assigned to Thirteenth Air Force, with its P-47Ns replaced by North American P-51 Mustangs. It was inactivated in 1946.

=== Cold War Air Defense ===
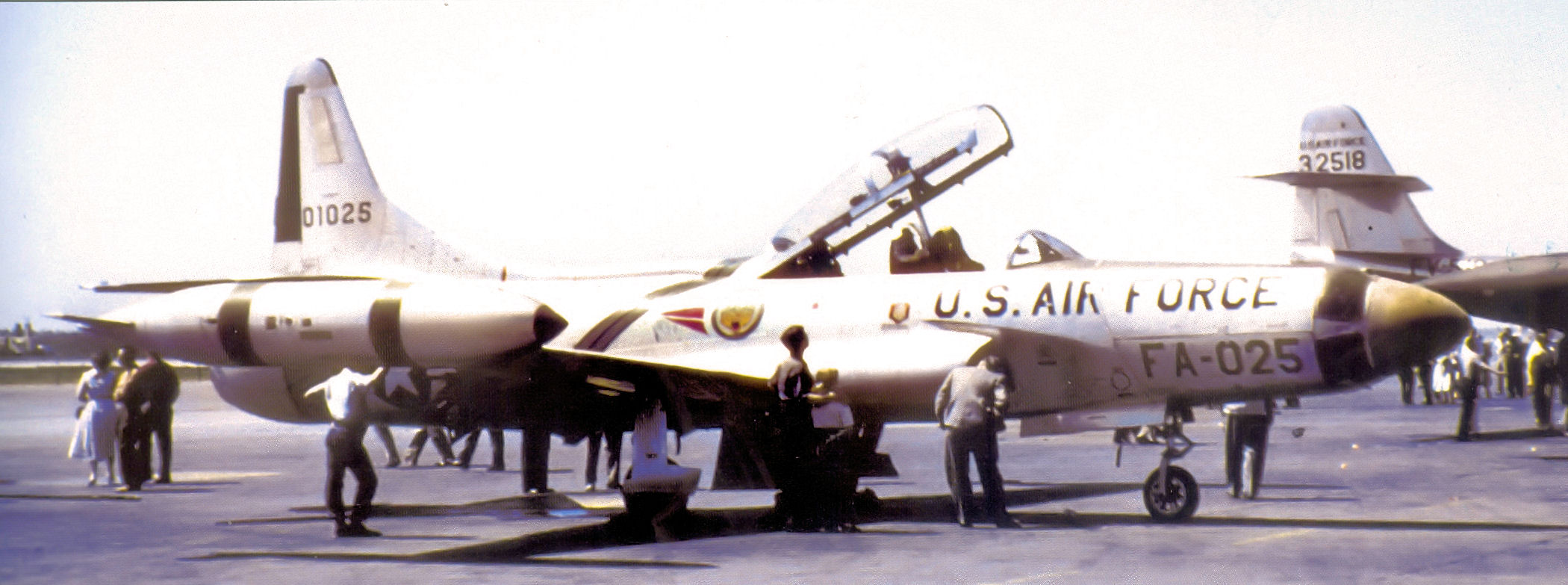
Squadron F-94C at Otis AFB (Note: Aircraft is Lockeheed F-94C-1-LO Starfire, serial 50-1025, taken in 1954 at an Otis AFB open house.)

The squadron was activated in November 1952 as an Air Defense Command (ADC) interceptor squadron at Otis Air Force Base, Massachusetts with Lockheed F-94C Starfires. The F-94C was the first model of the Starfire to be entirely armed with FFAR rockets, eliminating the cannon armament of earlier models. It was the first operational F-94C unit. By June 1955, The squadron had replaced its Starfires with Northrop F-89D Scorpions.

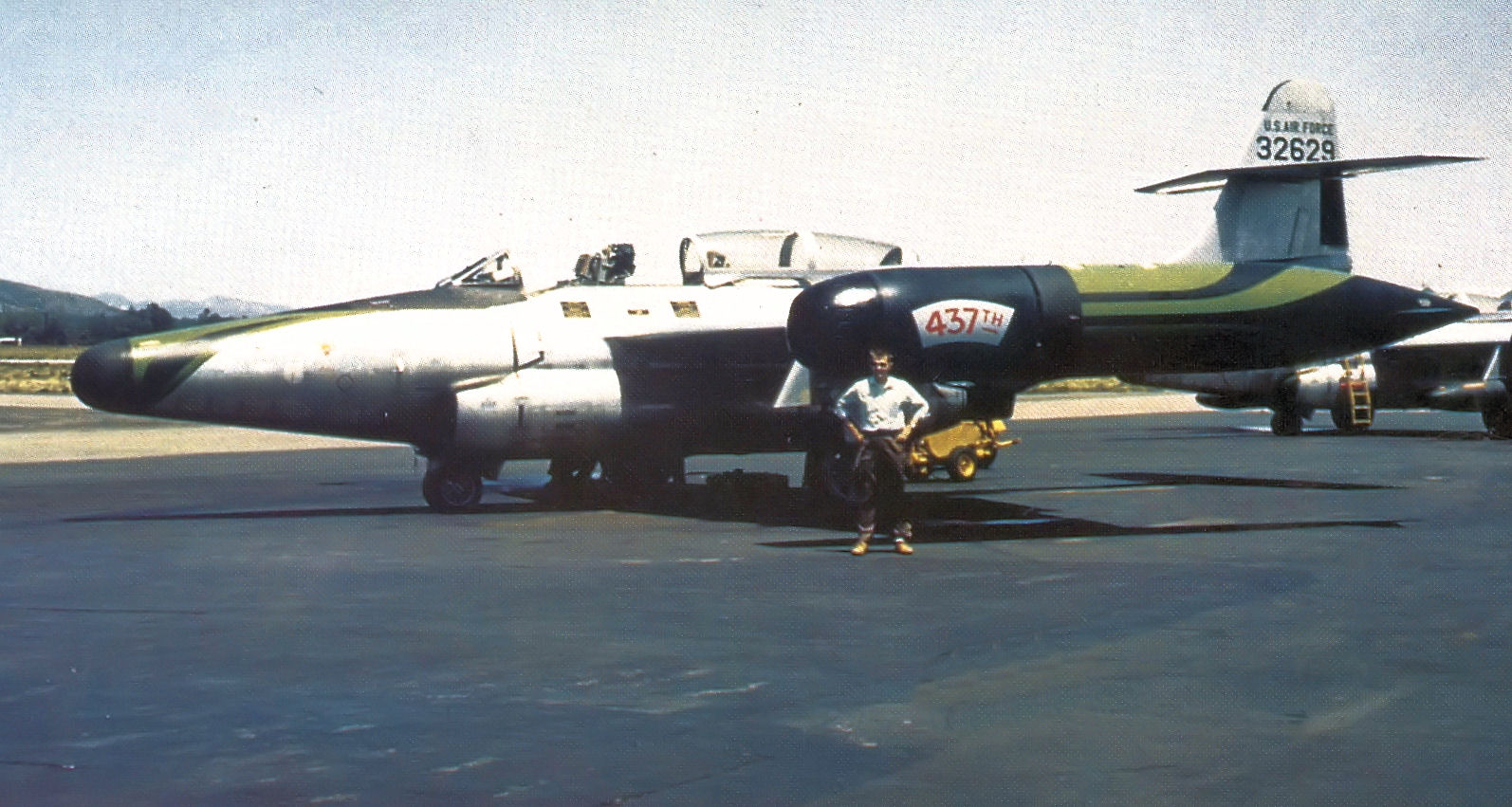
437th F-89D at Oxnard AFB about 1955 (Note: Aircraft is Northrop F-89D Scorpion,, serial 53-2629.)

In August 1955 ADC implemented Project Arrow, which was designed to bring back on the active list the fighter units which had compiled memorable records in the two world wars. As a result, the squadron was transferred on paper to Oxnard Air Force Base, California, where it assumed the personnel and F-94C aircraft of the 354th Fighter-Interceptor Squadron and rejoined its World War II headquarters, the 414th Fighter Group. By the start of April 1956 it again transitioned into F-89Ds, adding F-89Hs in July. The H model was armed with GAR-1 Falcons in addition to the unguided FFAR rockets. In spring 1958, it replaced its F-89Hs with F-89Js, which were equipped with the MB-1 Genie with a nuclear warhead. Nuclear armed Scorpions were only placed on thirty-minute “standby alert” in addition to the unit’s requirement to maintain aircraft on five minute alert armed with conventional weapons.

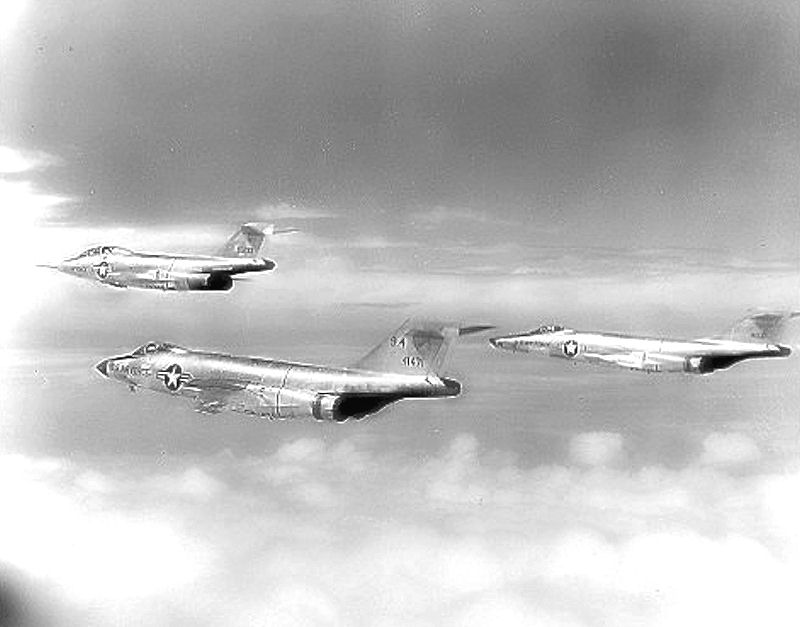
3 F-101Bs of the 437th FIS, Oxnard AFB, California 1964

In January 1960 the squadron was equipped with new McDonnell F-101B Voodoo supersonic interceptor, and the F-101F operational and conversion trainer. The two-seat trainer version was equipped with dual controls, but carried the same armament as the F-101B and were fully combat-capable. In February 1962, ADC increased the alert requirement for its units. In addition to the two aircraft each squadron had been maintaining on five minute alert, one third of the unit’s aircraft were placed on fifteen minute alert.

On 22 October 1962, at the beginning of the Cuban Missile Crisis, when President Kennedy announced the presence of Soviet intermediate-range ballistic missiles in Cuba. Continental Air Defense Command increased its weapons readiness status. This required the squadron to place all its planes on five minute alert. Later that day, North American Air Defense Command directed that one third of the squadron's Voodoos "in a quiet, low-key fashion" be flown to their interim dispersal bases. This dispersal included squadron aircraft flying with their weapons to the dispersal base, including those armed with Genies. On 17 November, after it had been confirmed that missiles and bombers had been removed from Cuba, the dispersed aircraft began to return to Oxnard. On 27 November, the squadron returned to normal alert status.

Although the number of ADC interceptor squadrons remained almost constant in the early 1960s, attrition (and the fact that production lines closed in 1961) caused a gradual drop in the number of planes assigned to a squadron, from 24 to typically 18 by 1964. The force reduction continued, finally resulting in a reduction in the number of interceptor units. As a result of this reduction, the squadron was inactivated in April 1968, and its aircraft were passed along to the Air National Guard.

Meanwhile, the 456th Fighter-Interceptor Squadron at Castle Air Force Base, California transferred its Convair F-106A Delta Darts and supporting personnel and equipment to Oxnard. Once the transfer was complete, the 437th was again activated, using the personnel and equipment of the 456th. However, on 30 September 1968 the squadron was inactivated and its personnel, mission and equipment were transferred to the 460th Fighter-Interceptor Squadron, which was activated at Oxnard the same day. The 437th operated the F-106 for only 3 months, making it the shortest-lived F-106 unit.

== Lineage ==
- Constituted as the 437th Fighter Squadron, Single Engine on 5 October 1944

Activated on 15 October 1944
Inactivated on 30 September 1946

- Redesignated 437th Fighter-Interceptor Squadron on 14 November 1952

Activated on 27 November 1952
Inactivated 29 April 1968

- Activated on 1 July 1968

Inactivated on 30 September 1968

=== Assignments ===
- 414th Fighter Group, 15 October 1944 – 30 September 1946
- 4707th Air Defense Wing, 27 November 1952
- 564th Air Defense Group, 16 February 1953
- 414th Fighter Group, 18 August 1955 – 29 April 1968
- 414th Fighter Group, 1 June 1968 – 30 September 1968

=== Stations ===
- Seymour Johnson Field, North Carolina, 15 October 1944
- Selfridge Field, Michigan, 21 November 1944
- Bluethenthal Field, North Carolina, 19 March – 5 June 1945
- North Field (Iwo Jima), 7 July 1945
- Clark Field, Luzon, Philippines, 23 December 1945
- Floridablanca Airfield, Luzon, Philippines, unknown-30 September 1946
- Otis Air Force Base, Massachusetts, 27 November 1952
- Oxnard Air Force Base, California, 18 August 1955 – 29 April 1968
- Oxnard Air Force Base, California, 1 June 1968 – 30 September 1968

=== Aircraft ===
- Republic P-47N Thunderbolt, 1944–1946
- Lockheed F-94C Starfire, 1952–1955, 1955–1956
- Northrop F-89D Scorpion, 1955, 1956–1958
- Northrop F-89H Scorpion, 1956–1958
- Northrop F-89J Scorpion, 1958–1960
- McDonnell F-101B Voodoo, 1960–1968
- McDonnell F-101F Voodoo, 1960–1968
- Convair F-106A Delta Dart, 1968
