= Donald S. Bryan =

American World War II flying ace

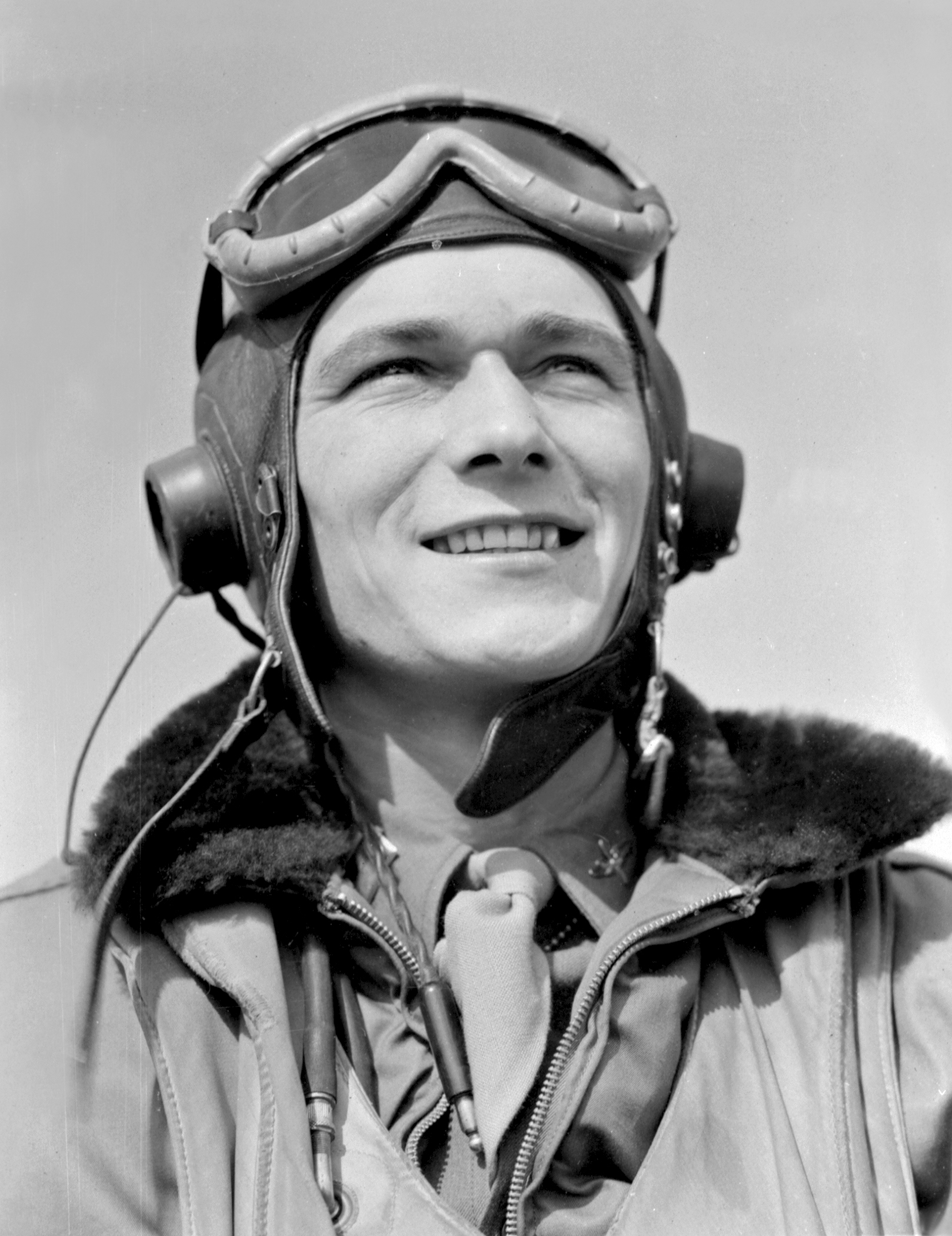
- Born: August 15, 1921; Hollister, California, U.S.
- Died: May 15, 2012 (aged 90); Adel, Georgia, U.S.
- Burial place: Christ Episcopal Church Urn Garden, Valdosta, Georgia, U.S.
- Military career
- Allegiance: United States
- Branch: United States Army Air Forces; United States Air Force
- Service years: 1942–1964
- Rank: Lieutenant Colonel
- Nicknames: Don; Bush
- Units: 328th Fighter Squadron; 352d Fighter Group
- Commands: 328th Fighter Squadron
- Conflicts: World War II
- Awards: Distinguished Service Cross; Distinguished Flying Cross (3); Air Medal (14)

Donald Septimus Bryan (August 15, 1921 – May 15, 2012) was an American flying ace in World War II, who was credited with 13 aerial victories while serving with the 352d Fighter Group.

== Early life ==
Bryan was born on 1921, to Ellis and Ethel Birdsall Bryan, and was raised on a farm near Paicines, California.

== Military career ==
On January 6, 1942, he enlisted in the Aviation Cadet Program of the U.S. Army Air Forces. He was commissioned a second lieutenant and awarded his pilot wings at Luke Field in Arizona, on July 26, 1942.

=== World War II ===
After the completion of his pilot training, Bryan completed P-40 Warhawk transition training from July to October 1942 and was assigned as a P-40 pilot with the 304th Fighter Squadron of the 337th Fighter Group in Florida, from October 1942 to March 1943. He was assigned to the 328th Fighter Squadron of the 352nd Fighter Group at Mitchel Field in New York, as a P-47 Thunderbolt pilot. In July 1943, the 352nd FG boarded the troopship RMS Queen Elizabeth. The group landed in the United Kingdom, and was assigned to RAF Bodney in Watton, Norfolk, under the operational control of the 67th Fighter Wing, VIII Fighter Command.

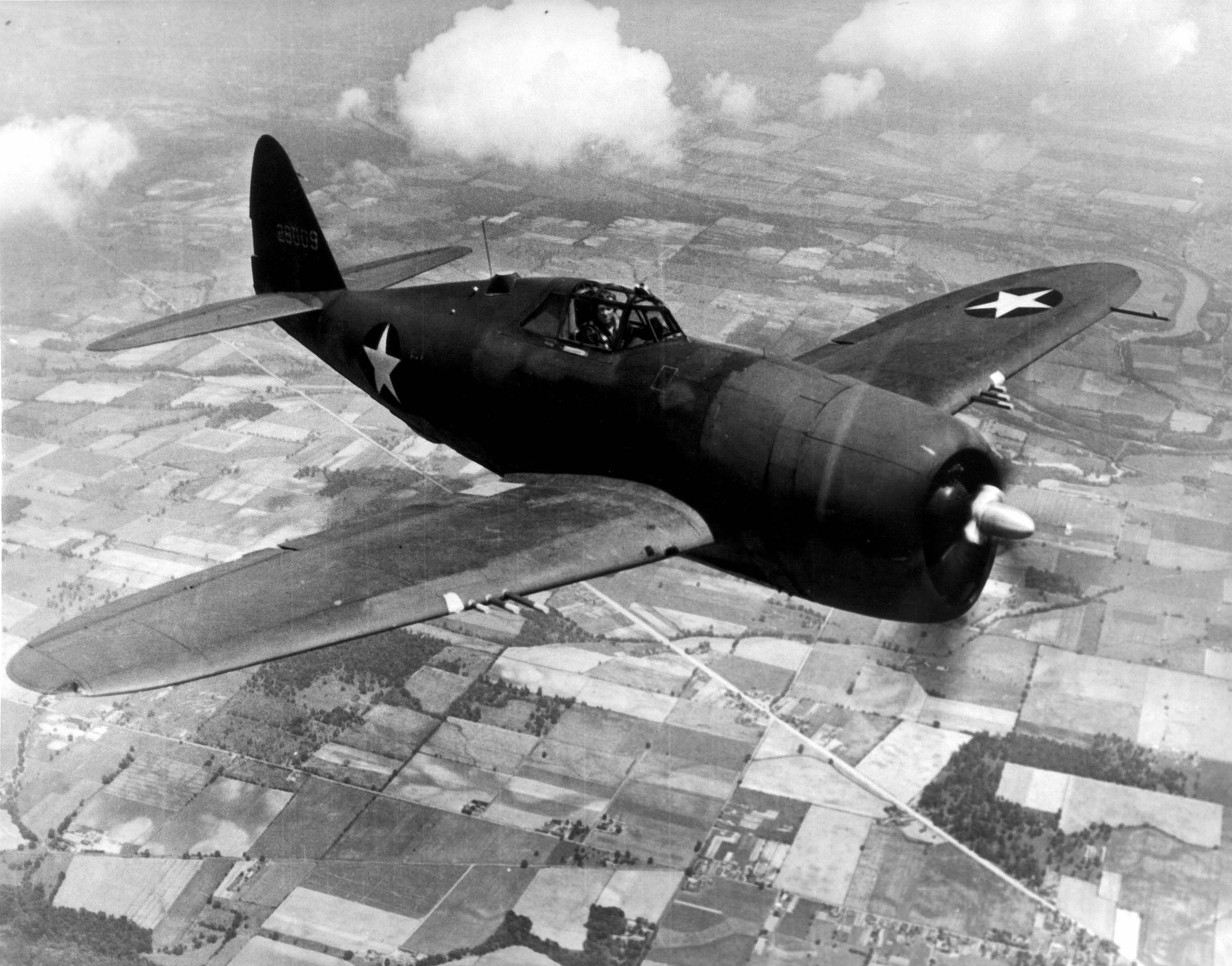
P-47D Thunderbolt

Flying the P-47, Bryan was credited with a shared aerial victory on January 29, 1944, when he and his wingman shot down a Focke-Wulf Fw 190 while en route to Namur, Belgium. On January 30, he shot down a Fw 190 over Emmen, Netherlands, his first solo aerial victory. On February 20, he and two of his wingmen were credited with the shared destruction of a Messerschmitt Bf 110. Bryan scored down his second and third aerial victories on February 24 and March 15, 1944, and scored another shared aerial victory on April 10, 1944. On April 18, 1944, he led a successful mission to find and rescue a fellow fighter pilot, who was forced to ditch in the North Sea on April 15.

In May 1944, he went back to the United States for shore leave, after the completion of his first tour.

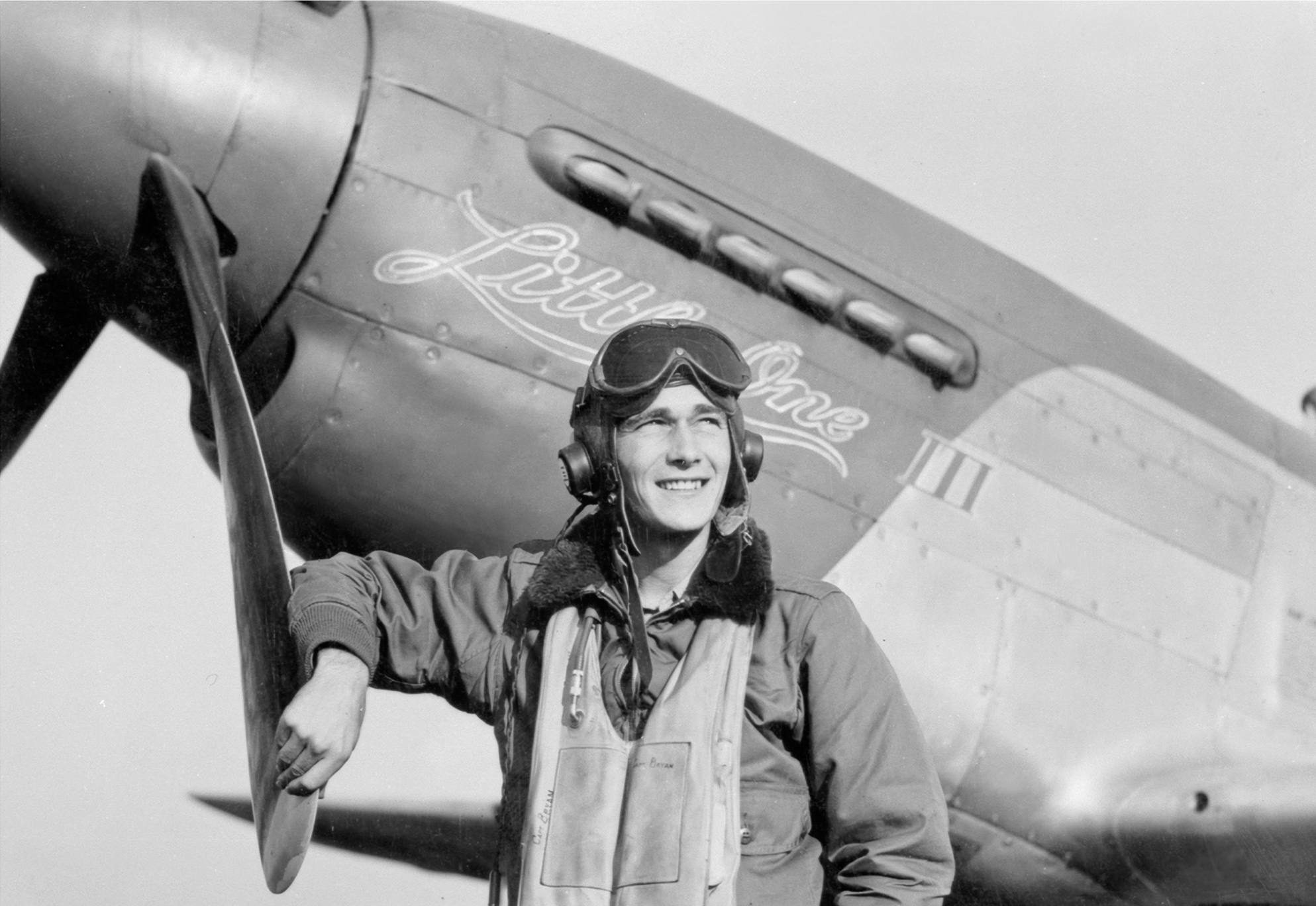
Bryan with his P-51D Mustang

On August 9, 1944, he returned to his unit, which by this time converted to the North American P-51 Mustangs. On September 27, 1944, he scored his first aerial victories in the P-51, when he shot down two Messerschmitt Bf 109s and damaged another Bf 109 at north of Frankfurt. His biggest day came on November 2, 1944, while leading a flight of P-51s on a bomber escort to attack oil refineries over Merseburg, Germany, they encountered a massive formation of Bf 109s heading to attack the bombers. Bryan led his flight in attacking the Bf 109s, including the shooting down the lead Bf 109 of the formation. In the massive aerial battle, Bryan was attacked by Bf 109s and he performed a daring maneuver called “inverted vertical reversement". In a 1989 interview, he recalled about the maneuver:

The aircraft does the darnedest thing you ever imagined. First, the tail snaps end to end with the nose and you fly up against the canopy and then the aircraft corkscrews around underneath. You end up going 180 degrees in the direction you were originally—were headed. Much slower but still a 100 degrees—180 degrees off the other flight path. It is absolutely impossible for an aircraft behind you to see where you were—went.

He managed to outmaneuver the attacking Bf-109s and continued to battle against them, managing to destroy a total of five enemy airplanes that day, making him one of the 38 USAAF pilots to become an "ace in a day". For his heroism in the mission, he received the Distinguished Service Cross.

During the Battle of the Bulge, which started on December 16, the 352nd FG was moved forward to airfield Y-29 near Asch, Belgium. On December 21, he damaged an Arado Ar 234 jet bomber and on December 23, he shot a Fw 190 over Liège. In January 1945, he was appointed as commander of the 328th Fighter Squadron. He scored his 13th and last aerial victory of the war, when he chased and shot down an Ar 234 over Germany on March 14, 1945, after encountering it during a bomber escort.

During World War II, Bryan was credited with destroying 13.33 enemy aircraft in aerial combat, while flying 140 combat missions. While serving with the 352d FG, his P-47 and P-51s were named in honor of wife Frances Norman, bearing the names "Little One", "Little One II" and "Little One III".

=== Post war ===
After returning to the U.S. and taking leave, Bryan served as Operations and Training Assistant Air Inspector with the 342nd Base Unit in Florida from July to September 1945. After the United States Army Air Forces became the United States Air Force in 1947, Bryan served in a variety of command and staff positions over the next 17 years, including with the Fifth Air Force in Japan and Air Defense Command, before his retirement from the Air Force in 1964.

== Later life ==
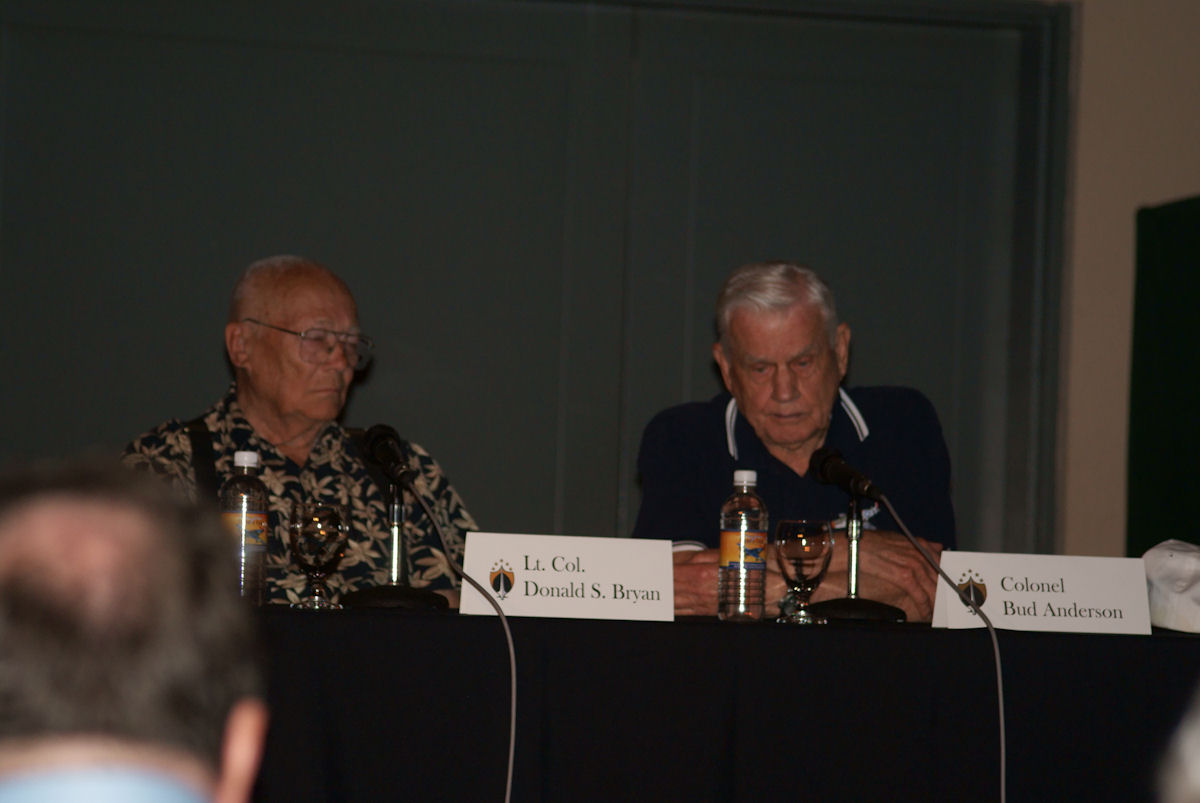
Bryan (left) with flying ace Bud Anderson during a discussion at 'Fantasy of Flight' (2010)

Bryan and his wife Frances had four children and eleven grandchildren.

After he retired from the Air Force, Bryan worked at an engineering firm in Syracuse, New York. In 1981, he and his wife moved to Adel, Georgia, where they lived for the remainder of their lives and were active members of the community.

In 2007, Bryan appeared on an episode of the History Channel series Dogfights. The episode titled 'P-51 Mustang' features his "ace in a day" mission. The episode was the eleventh episode of the second season of the series, which recreated historical air combat campaigns using modern computer graphics.

Bryan died on May 15, 2012, at the age of 90. He was buried at the Christ Episcopal Church Urn Garden in Valdosta, Georgia.

== Aerial victory credits ==
Chronicle of aerial victories
Date	#	Type	Location	Aircraft flown	Unit Assigned
January 29, 1944	0.5	Focke-Wulf Fw 190	Namur, Belgium	P-47D Thunderbolt	328 FS, 352 FG
January 30, 1944	1	Fw 190	Emmen, Netherlands	P-47D	328 FS, 352 FG
February 20, 1944	0.33	Messerschmitt Bf 110	Vogelsand, Germany	P-47D	328 FS, 352 FG
February 24, 1944	1	Messerschmitt Bf 109	Dümmer lake, Germany	P-47D	328 FS, 352 FG
March 15, 1944	1	Bf 109	Heusden, Netherlands	P-47D	328 FS, 352 FG
April 10, 1944	0.5	Fw 190	Dormans, France	P-47D	328 FS, 352 FG
September 27, 1944	2	Bf 109	Frankfurt, Germany	P-51D Mustang	328 FS, 352 FG
November 2, 1944	5	Bf 109	Merseburg, Germany	P-51D	328 FS, 352 FG
December 23, 1944	1	Fw 190	Liège, Belgium	P-51D	328 FS, 352 FG
March 14, 1945	1	Arado Ar 234	Elsaffthal, Germany	P-51D	328 FS, 352 FG

SOURCES: Air Force Historical Study 85: USAF Credits for the Destruction of Enemy Aircraft, World War II

== Awards and honors ==
His awards include:

U.S. Air Force Command Pilot Badge
Distinguished Service Cross
Distinguished Flying Cross with two bronze oak leaf clusters
Air Medal with two silver and two bronze oak leaf clusters
Air Medal (second ribbon required for accoutrement spacing)
American Campaign Medal
European-African-Middle Eastern Campaign Medal with silver and bronze campaign stars
World War II Victory Medal
National Defense Service Medal with service star
Air Force Longevity Service Award with four bronze oak leaf clusters

- A replica of his P-51D "Little One III" is on display at the National Museum of the Mighty Eighth Air Force in Pooler, Georgia.
- The Junior Reserve Officers' Training Corps of the Lowndes High School named its academic honor society in his honor.

=== Distinguished Service Cross citation ===

Bryan, Donald S.
Captain, U.S. Army Air Forces
328th Fighter Squadron, 352d Fighter Group, 5th Air Force
Date of Action: November 2, 1944
Citation:

The President of the United States of America, authorized by Act of Congress, July 9, 1918, takes pleasure in presenting the Distinguished Service Cross to Captain (Air Corps) Donald Septimus Bryan, United States Army Air Forces, for extraordinary heroism in connection with military operations against an armed enemy while serving as Pilot of a P-51 Fighter Airplane in the 328th Fighter Squadron, 352d Fighter Group, Eighth Air Force, during a bomber escort mission over Germany, on 2 November 1944. On this date, Captain Bryan was leading his flight in escort to our heavy bombers when he observed a formation of approximately fifty enemy aircraft coming in to attack the bombers. Captain Bryan led his flight into the center of the attacking formation of enemy aircraft where he closed on one and hit it several times. He was now alone and in the midst of many enemy aircraft who were unusually aggressive and attacking vigorously. Captain Bryan made a pass from a stern at eight ME-109s and shot two down in flames and damaged another. He continued to fight with the enemy, being simultaneously attacked himself. He finally destroyed five enemy aircraft and damaged two others, having engaged the last enemy with but a single gun operating. His courage and outstanding aggressiveness in the presence of great danger were exemplary of the highest traditions of the Army Air Forces.
