= 486th Fighter Squadron =

United States Air Force military unit

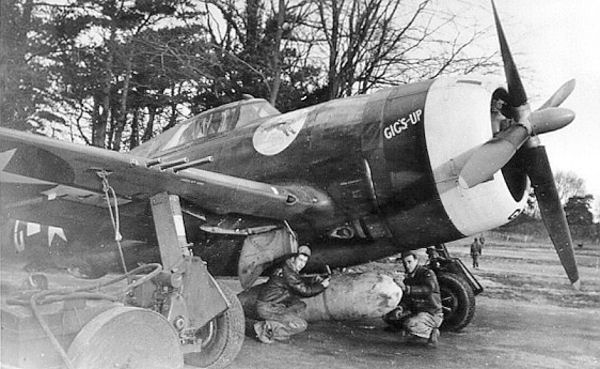
- Squadron P-47D Thunderbolt at RAF Bodney (Note: Aircraft is Republic P-47D-2-RA, serial 42-22548, "Gigs-Up".)
- Active: 1942–1945
- Country: United States
- Branch: United States Air Force
- Role: Fighter
- Nickname: Blue nosed bastards of Bodney
- Engagements: European Theater of Operations
- Decorations: Distinguished Unit Citation; French Croix de Guerre with Palm
- Commander: then Lt. Col. Luther H. Richmond (to April 15, 1944)

Insignia
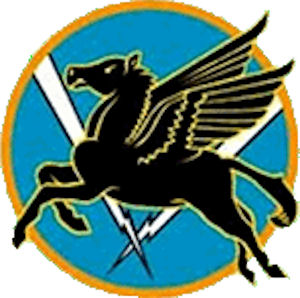
- 486th Fighter Squadron emblem
- Fuselage code: PZ

The 486th Fighter Squadron is an inactive United States Air Force unit. It activated during World War II and was assigned to the 352nd Fighter Group of VIII Fighter Command. After training in the United States, it deployed to the European Theater of Operations, where it earned a Distinguished Unit Citation and a French Croix de Guerre with Palm for its combat actions. Following V-E Day, it returned to the United States and was inactivated at the port of embarkation, Camp Kilmer, New Jersey, on 9 November 1945.

== History ==
=== Formation and training in the United States ===
The Adjutant General directed the activation of the 352nd Fighter Group on 1 October 1942. Among its components was the 21st Fighter Squadron, formed by redesignating the 21st Pursuit Squadron as the 21st Fighter Squadron. The squadron began training under that designation. Just before the squadron shipped overseas, in May 1943, headquarters became aware that the 21st Pursuit Squadron, whose personnel were all in Japanese POW camps, was still being maintained on the rolls of the United States Army as an active unit: that there were two 21st Pursuit or Fighter Squadrons. As a result, the designation as the 21st Fighter Squadron was revoked. The squadron was retroactively activated as the 486th Fighter Squadron. (Note: Some original squadron members continued to wear the 21st Pursuit Squadron emblem on their flight jackets. Watkins, p. 57.) However, because the original directive was revoked, the 21st Pursuit Squadron and the 486th Fighter Squadron are not related under U.S. Army lineage rules.

The squadron was activated at Mitchel Field, New York, although its formation occurred at Bradley Field, Connecticut. and it trained with Republic P-47 Thunderbolts at various bases in the northeast United States. While training, the squadron also served in the air defense of the northeast as part of the New York Fighter Wing. In mid-June 1943, the squadron moved to Camp Kilmer and sailed on the RMS Queen Elizabeth for England on 1 July.

=== Combat in the European Theater ===
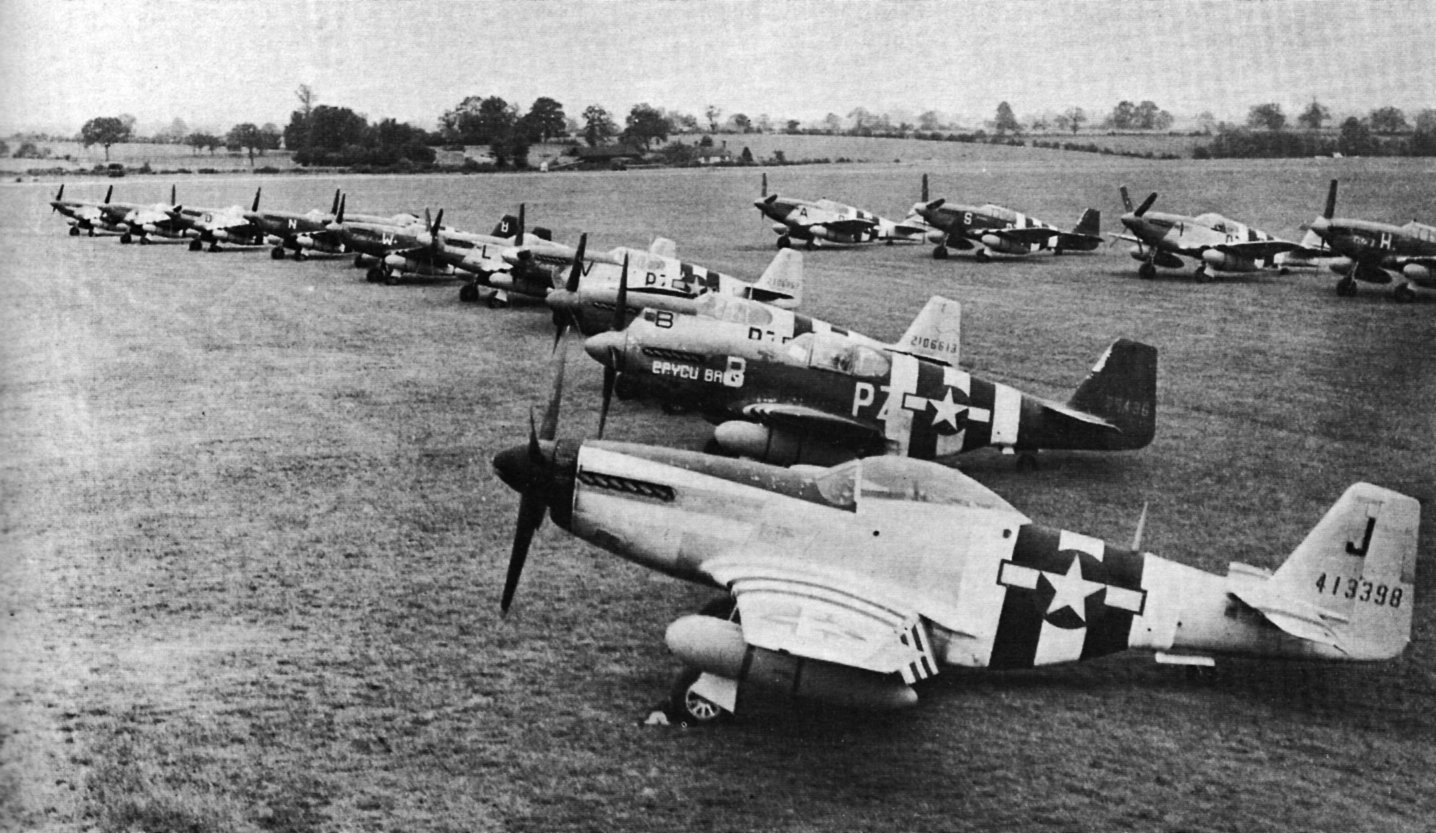
352d Fighter Group P-51s (Note: These Mustangs were deployed to RAF Debden to participate in Operation Frantic. The second plane in the first row is a P-51B or C from the 486th Fighter Squadron.)

The squadron flew its first combat mission on 9 September 1943. It concentrated on flying escort missions for VIII Bomber Command heavy bombers participating in the strategic bombing campaign against Germany. From 20 February to 25 February 1944, it flew cover for bombers involved in the Big Week campaign against the German aircraft manufacturing industry.

In April 1944 the squadron began to replace its Thunderbolts with longer range North American P-51D Mustangs. On 8 May, the squadron was escorting bombers on a raid on Braunschweig. It routed an attack by a numerically superior force of German interceptors, continuing the fight until most planes had used all their ammunition and were running short on fuel, requiring the unit to return to base. For this action, the squadron was awarded the Distinguished Unit Citation. In addition to escort missions, the squadron flew counter air missions. Returning from its escort missions, it often engaged in air interdiction attacks. The squadron was sent to RAF Debden in June to reinforce the 4th Fighter Group, providing top cover for Boeing B-17 Flying Fortresses in Operation Frantic, the shuttle mission from England to the Soviet Union. Other units protected the bombers on the way to the target, an oil facility near Berlin. The squadron rendezvoused with the bombers over Poland and defended them against an attack by 20 Focke-Wulf Fw 190 fighters. P-51 maintenance personnel had flown as gunners on the bombers, and were available to ready the squadron's planes for an escort mission attacking a target in Yugoslavia. Before returning to England, the squadron participated in missions in the Balkans, operating from Italy after the first mission.

As the German Army launched the counteroffensive known as the Battle of the Bulge, a detachment of the squadron that included all of its air echelon deployed to Asch Airfield on 23 December 1944 to reinforce Ninth Air Force flying air support missions. On 1 January the detachment earned the squadron the French Croix de Guerre with Palm, when its airfield was attacked by 50 Luftwaffe fighter aircraft, just as its planes were taking off for an area patrol. In the ensuing aerial battle, about half the attacking German aircraft were destroyed with no loss to the squadron. The detachment moved to Chievres Airfield, Belgium in late January 1945, where it was joined by the rest of the squadron, coming under the control of Eighth Air Force again. From Chievres, it provided cover for Operation Varsity, the airborne assault to establish a bridgehead across the Rhine.

In April 1945, the squadron returned to England, flying its last mission on 3 May. It was credited with the destruction of 115 enemy aircraft in combat. Following V-E Day, many of the squadron personnel transferred for early return to the United States. The remaining personnel sailed on the RMS Queen Mary on 4 November 1945. After arriving in the United States, the squadron inactivated on 10 November 1945.

== Lineage ==
- Constituted as the 486th Fighter Squadron on 29 September 1942

Activated on 1 October 1942
Inactivated on 10 November 1945

=== Assignments ===
- 352d Fighter Group, 1 October 1942 – 10 November 1945

=== Stations ===
- Mitchel Field, New York, 1 October 1942
- Bradley Field, Connecticut, October 1942
- Westover Field, Massachusetts, November 1942
- Trumbull Field, Connecticut, c. 15 January 1943
- Republic Field, New York, 8 March 1943
- Westover Field, Massachusetts, 24 May – 16 June 1943
- RAF Bodney, England (Sta 141), 7 July 1943 (detachment operated from Asch Airfield (Y-29), Belgium, after 23 December 1944)
- Chievres Airfield (A-84), Belgium, 28 January 1945
- RAF Bodney, England (Sta 141), c. 14 April 1945 – 4 November 1945
- Camp Kilmer, New Jersey, 9–10 November 1945

=== Aircraft ===
- Republic P-47 Thunderbolt, 1942-1944
- North American P-51 Mustang, 1944-1945

=== Awards and campaigns ===
Award streamer	Award	Dates	Notes
	Distinguished Unit Citation	8 May 1944	Brunswick, Germany
	French Croix de Guerre with Palm	1 January 1945	

Campaign Streamer	Campaign	Dates	Notes
	Air Offensive, Europe	7 July 1943 – 5 June 1944	
	Normandy	6 June 1944 – 24 July 1944	
	Northern France	25 July 1944 – 14 September 1944	
	Rhineland	15 September 1944 – 21 March 1945	
	Ardennes-Alsace	16 December 1944 – 25 January 1945	
	Central Europe	22 March 1944 – 21 May 1945	
	Air Combat, EAME Theater	7 July 1943 – 11 May 1945	
