= Never Say Die (memoir) =

1961 memoir by Jack Hawkins

- First edition cover
- Author: Jack Hawkins
- Language: English
- Genre: Memoir
- Publisher: Dorrance Publishing
- Publication date: 1961

Never Say Die is a memoir by Jack Hawkins, a lieutenant with the United States's 4th Marines in World War II. It was first published in 1961.

The book relates Hawkins' experiences as a prisoner of war in Japanese prison camps after the American surrender in the Philippines.

== Full Book Summary ==
Long, careful and very secret planning was involved for this hazardous venture. Here is a list of some articles which had to be procured, taken out the gate, and stashed away in a safe place in the jungle, to be available at the appointed time: compass, sextant, chronometer, navigation tables, protractor, dividers, chart of the Southwest Pacific, pencils. Some of these items had to be hand-made. Each man had to have a change of clothing, blanket, shelter tent, mosquito net, canteen, mess kit, and food for five days. Medical supplies had to include quinine, sulfa drugs, first-aid kit, water purifier, and any other medicines they could get their hands on. Other equipment included bolo knives, field glasses, file, hammer, pliers, matches, cooking-can with handle. This indicates the kind of meticulous planning required for prisoners to effect an escape that had a chance to result in survival. ... Among other things, each man was chosen for certain basic qualities, such as character, physical fitness, desire and courage. Also, they were chosen for certain knowledge and/or technical skills required to do the job, and each man was assigned specific responsibilities. They were able to enlist a couple of Filipino ex-convicts still living in the area as advisers and guides, who were invaluable.

When he and others finally escape from a camp, they join the American-Filipino guerrillas under the command of Lt. Col Wendell Fertig. Hawkins serves with Fertig for several months and is involved in numerous actions. For these actions he was later awarded the Distinguished Service Cross.

Also, an important point is that he persevered throughout the story. An important example is the scene where a group of soldiers and he escape from the POW camp and are met by a gang of guerrilla soldiers. After they prove to be friendly, one of the soldiers tells them that he was trying to shoot them but the cartridge was bad. This shows that those who persevere through hard times will be eventually rewarded.

Then, with the help of the guerrilla soldiers, they go up north to get communications with an American submarine to come and take them to Australia where they could be safe and then rejoin the fighting.

Also, before escaping from a camp in Manila, Hawkins is held in a camp in Corregidor where the conditions are horrible and people lose all sense of discipline and do horrible things. People are dying left and right and they are all falling of disease. Then they are taken and sent to a camp in Manila., along with people in other camps.

Before being sent to the Corregidor, Hawkins and other soldiers had to march from their points of surrender to the camp. This march was nicknamed the March of Death because of how many died of disease, exhaustion. And those who could not continue were killed. The march to Manila (after a trip by sea) was less brutal, but still took lives. (In the camp in Manila, only the strong were sent to Manila to work. This helped soldiers improve conditions by secretly eating the food they harvested). Also the conditions were better because this was the lenient Major Maeda who was running the place, not strict lieutenant Hozumi.

Eventually evacuated to Australia by an American submarine, Hawkins later was involved in planning for the invasions of Iwo Jima and Okinawa. He stayed in the USMC after World War II and eventually retired as a full colonel.

Hawkins also talks about his fiancee, Rhea Ritter, who later becomes his wife. They met at the beginning of Hawkins' senior year at the Military Academy in September 1938. Their wedding took place at the Naval Academy Chapel.

This book was recently republished under Barbara B. Baker with the express purpose of being used in Challenger School curriculum.

== Chapter Summary ==
All information and page numbers from:
Hawkins, Col. Jack. Never Say Die. 1961. 4th ed., Sandy, Utah, The Learning Crew, 2014.

=== Chapter 1 ===
US 4th Marines defending beaches of “The Rock”, or Corregidor (Island in Manila Bay used as a fortress). Jack Hawkins, lieutenant of the Second Battalion (infantry battalion in the US Marine Corps) at the time, was assigned to command reinforced platoon of machine gunners covering a long strip of rocky beach.

As long as they held the island, Japanese troops couldn't enter the bay and use facilities in Manila. General Homma, enemy commander of Japan whose troops were in the Philippines, wanted to seize the weak Corregidor as soon as possible. So, he massed artillery in southern Bataan (province three miles across Corregidor) and furiously bombarded US troops. He also used aerial attacks, but those were insignificant compared to the bombardment.

Although Corregidor was well-fortified with artillery, the guns were pointing towards the South China Sea, meaning the island couldn't defend against those coming from within Manila Bay.

Landing came on May 5 night, along with lots of artillery fire. The 4th Marines fought and slaughtered Homma's men. During battle, US commander General Wainright didn't want to lose any more lives → US troops in Philippines surrender May 6th → everyone including Hawkins became a prisoner of war. Japanese moved him from Corregidor to Bilibid Prison in Manila for two days, and then served internment in Prisoner-of-war Camp One (in Cabanatuan in Luzon, Philippines). Conditions were horrible there, but Hawkins hoped it would improve once he moved to an actual organized Prisoner-of-war camp.

- Not the case; General Mori (camp commander) starved them by feeding small serving of wormy rice and green water (Hawkins kept the worms in for more nutrition)
- Simple items such as beds, clothes, blankets, razors, and soap were not provided
- No cooking supplies given (cooked in washpots with a ladle over fire)
- No showers → diseases → death, but Mori didn't care (population went from 9000 to 6000)
- Hawkins lost 30 pounds, had scurvy; avoided diphtheria epidemic somehow

Jack talks to his friend Mike Dobervich (classmate and lieutenant; survived the March of Death (Bataan Death March), an 80-mile march forced on American and Filipino troops), who says the Japanese are going to move 1000 men out of the camp.

- Jack thinks this wouldn't be good because if they went to Japan they would be prisoners of war til the end. However, if they stayed, they had a chance of being rescued by American troops.
- Japanese guards exaggerated their victory at Pearl Harbor and that they were annihilating remnants of US forces → Jack questions if they're telling the truth
- Meet captain Austin Shofner (Shof) to pass time
- The Japanese confirm Mike's claim of moving the men → Jack and Mike submit their names to go; place they're being moved to still not announced. They were set to move on October 26, the day after Jack's 26th birthday

=== Chapter 2 ===
Day of departure arrives, and the prisoners bid their farewells to those who are staying. They were to march to Cabanatuan, where a train would take them to Manila. From Manila, they would go aboard ship. A Japanese Officer named Hozumi, whom everyone hated, guided the prisoners.

When they reach Cabanatuan, Jack notices how the camp remained unchanged since the last time he saw it. Houses were burned down, as a battle took place (Japanese advanced toward Manila from their landing beaches at Lingayen Gulf.)

As they were boarding the train, a guard shoved them into the car. The cars were extremely overcrowded. When they reached Manila, they marched to Bilibid Prison (the place where Jack had stayed for two days…), which was quite empty. Jack, Mike, and Shof chose an open area of concrete to sleep on.

- They ate rice, greens, and meat, which seemed like a “magnificent repast” because of their hunger.

Their ship was called the Erie Maru, a cargo ship which carried a lot of gasoline. This meant if an American torpedo attacked, their ship would be more likely to go up in flames, killing the entire crew. They boarded the ship, and once again, it was extremely overcrowded.

- The three soldiers wanted to escape the overcrowding → tried to get up on the deck
- Got up, but there was overcrowding on the deck as well
- Spotted a stack of rice bags, decided to climb up to escape overcrowding

The ship crosses Corregidor, which seems to have revived all of its lush wildlife. If the ship turns south, they were headed to Mindanao (which is closer to friendly territory). If the ship turns north, they were headed to Japan. Hozumi later announced they were headed to Mindanao.

=== Chapter 3 ===
The Erie Maru stopped briefly at Cebu City, Cebu, and Jack was relieved to see much of the gasoline being removed. However, there was still enough gasoline left on the ship to start a fire. The three stand guard so no one takes their spot on top of the rice bags. They preferred avoiding the suffocation over facing the harsh weather. They also believed it was a safer place should the ship be torpedoed.

While on the ship, the men come across an island that is a swimmable distance away. However, Mike suggests that if they swim, the guards will either hear or see them. And, with Hozumi in command, they would have no reason to expect more lenient treatment.

Jack's plan to escape: “head for the west coast of Luzon, procure a native outrigger sailing craft, and try to reach the mainland of Asia, some five hundred miles to the west.” Had idea to discuss plan with his marine companion, Hugh Tistadt.

- They were about to execute the plan, but sought the advice of an officer who had worked in the Philippines before
  - He said that if they stayed low, the Japanese would attack, and if they stayed high in the mountains, they would get malaria → wanted to formulate another plan
  - Shof suggests boarding another ship with fewer Japanese, which was headed for Australia
  - Though ambitious, they attempt to form another plan
    - First, they decide to attempt murder on the Japanese guards, but they had no weapons
    - Second, they decide they can somehow take control over the ship, with all the navy officers on the ship. However, this plan wasn't feasible either.

They reach the city of Davao and unload the remaining cargo. They set sail again to a sawmill, where they were to leave the Erie Maru and march 20 miles inland to the new camp. Marched through many bushes, vines, thorns, animals, and rain → muscles became knotted and feet became cut up.

They finally reached camp in Davao, Mindanao (Davao Penal Colony). A man (assumed to be an interpreter) told them to go in very harshly. Hozumi got mad because the interpreter had no power to do that. They had to sleep in the cold with wet clothes on the bare floor with no blanket or replacement clothing.

=== Chapter 4 ===
The men actually had decent food for breakfast. The interpreter's name was revealed as Major Maeda (Mike called him Simon Legree), who would address them with Hozumi translating.

- Maeda told them they had to work, and anyone who didn't work would be severely punished
- Buildings were arranged by rank (enlisted soldiers got the bad barracks, while the higher ranks got the “better” ones)
- Jack, Mike, and Shof got barrack 5, for lieutenants and captains

Davao Penal Colony was established by Philippine government as a civil penal institution. Convicts were brought to the land to serve their sentences as agricultural workers.

Maeda lost no time in making the men work. The three men were assigned the job of carrying heavy cans of wet gravel. This work continued for a long time; they had to do many tasks involving the farms → Jack knew the exact location of everything on the land (was later to prove valuable…).

Logging was also another difficult task, which Maeda made the men do. Some of the Filipino convicts were employed to fell the giant mahogany trees, and the American prisoners sawed them into logs. Their legs were covered in leeches, and the Filipinos taught them a trick to remove them by applying wet tobacco to the lighted end of a homemade cigarette. This caused them to turn lose; if you pull them out, they cause infection.

The food provided at this camp was also much better than the food they had before. They actually got protein in their diet, though the food was somewhat unhygienic (had worms) → regained strength. However, many prisoners at DaPeCol had sunk too far physically to recover their health, even with the improved diet. There was also still no medicine. Shof suggested to give a fourth of their rations to the sick, and Jack and Mike agreed. Malaria and beriberi were the two leading causes of illness in the camp.

While relations with the guards varied with some showing leniency, while most did not frequently sought opportunities to closely monitor or interact with the prisoners.

- Soldier walks up to Jack, talks with him about family, and hands him a box of cigarettes (pp. 60)

=== Chapter 5 ===
Maeda realized that the most efficient working method was division of labor and specialized jobs. He wanted every single soldier to have their own assigned jobs; Shof tried to convince the guards to give the three men jobs that they could benefit from. It worked, and Pappy (one of the guards) gave them a 15-man plowing job, which gave them more food because they got to go all over the farm.

A Filipino convict, Joe, taught them how to plow. After their ludicrous performance, Joe showed them himself, but he could do no better. He poked the bull with his gun, which made the bull obey his orders.

However, as time went on, the soldiers began to get more skilled at the task of plowing. They diligently worked, because they realized that the plowing job made up the general planting program from which they would get their food supplies.

A few days later, the detail leader informed the group that Maeda decided to let this detail (group) and a few others working around the central part of the camp go without guards. He thinks the group will work better that way. The soldiers were excited, however, the leader announced that patrols would circulate constantly to check on them.

Though the patrol rule caused some difficulty, the group soon found out that the bulls were essentially a pass to get them anywhere. If a guard asked where they would going, they could just say they were plowing and the guards would allow them to pass.

The next day, the men noticed pig tracks, and wanted to catch a pig for food. They didn't know how to make traps, but a Filipino convict noticed their interest in Philippine woodlore, and taught them how to make it. Bananas would serve as the bait. They caught a pig, but it fell into the water → meat was spoiled. However, they received entertainment when one of the patrol officers fell into the trap as well.

On Sundays, considered break days, four men of the detail group were required to take the animals to graze and feed them water. They enjoyed this because they got to leave the dreary camp. This requirement would also prove to be a significant factor bearing upon the plans in which Jack was soon to be involved.

=== Chapter 6 ===
Maeda announced five-day holiday from work (starting December 23rd) at Christmas time, promising special Christmas dinner and entertainment. Entertainment took place in a chapel on a rainy day.

The entertainment rekindled old memories from Jack's life, giving him nostalgia. He suddenly was overcome by an urging desire to burst out of his nightmarish life.

The men were given two packs of cigarettes on Christmas morning, and men were seen trading items such as clothing or soap for cigarettes. Religious services at the chapel were held every Sunday. Christmas dinner was served (rice with a large serving of carabao meat, gravy, and camotes).

Jack was bored so he studied a map of the pacific, which he got from a friend. He noticed a chain of islands leading from Mindanao to Australia, and he had a plan of travelling aboard a ship which would sail along this island chain (to remain close to land in case of danger). The men talk with Shof, and realize how easy it is to actually escape the camp. However, surviving outside the camp in wild territory would be extremely difficult, especially without the right supplies.

After much discussion, they came to the conclusion that there would be less reprisal with Maeda, a less strict ruler, in command. Their plan had to be extremely well thought out, with almost no chance of failure (otherwise they may be severely punished, like what happened with soldiers who tried to escape Cabanatuan…). Some who tried to escape Cabanatuan were allowed to live, but in cases where death was more preferable. On Christmas of 1942, they resolved that somehow they would escape.

=== Chapter 7 ===
A miracle that would advance their escape plan occurred when the Red Cross (South African, Canadian, American) supplied the soldiers with a steady supply of food and medicine. Each soldier was provided a food pack with a dozen cans of food.

“The Red Cross shipment was a boon to our escape plans, since it provided the initial food supply we would need to sustain us after our break until contact could be made with guerrilla forces or other friendly civilians. It also gave us hope of obtaining medicines, such as quinine, antiseptics, and sulfa drugs, which would be essential for survival in the jungle.”

As their planning progressed, they wanted to enlarge their escape group with men who would display courage and who were strong enough to endure the hardships they were yet to face. If they chose men who refused, their intentions could spread fast, and the Japanese would know.

They decided to talk to Ed Dyess, a soldier who courageously shot down many enemy ships before. He agreed to go with them. However, he said if Ed goes, two other men (Sam Grashio and Leo Boelens) also go.

- The three men knew Sam, but they didn't know Leo. They eventually find out that he does mechanical work in the military, which would prove to be a vital asset to the team.
- NOTE: every time they talk to each other about their escape plans, they talk about something else first to avoid gaining the attention of eavesdroppers (otherwise their plan would be leaked).
- Ed's plan is similar to theirs; getting a sailboat (banca) and sailing to Australia
- Had a meeting with all the men (Jack, Mike, Shof, Ed, Sam, Leo) to talk about escape plans
  - Ed's alternative plan was to steal a Japanese plane on one of the airfields in Davao and fly it out, but getting one full of gas would be an issue.
  - One escape plan involved sneaking through the fence in the middle of the night. The other involved leaving from a working party (They would be outside the compound to begin with). Jack thought it was best to leave from a working party. The problem was that they had to work together to escape with no outsiders from the same party coming along.
  - Discussed items needed for the journey; decided that the marines should make a list
  - Then discussed navigation, which no one could do without the supplies. They decided to try to get a naval officer, Melvyn McCoy. But, if they couldn't, they would just carry out their plans.

They all get ready for a baseball game against the Japanese, who challenged them to form a team to beat them. Dyess was captain, Shof was catcher, and Jack would play shortstop.

=== Chapter 8 ===
Major Maeda and Lt. Hozumi were spectating, and General Yuki was to be umpire. The Japanese had adopted American baseball language, with no Japanese replacements. The game ended, and the Japanese won.

After the game, the six conspirators discussed plans again, and Shof announced that McCoy agreed to go. However, McCoy wanted to bring three other soldiers (Major Stephen Mellnik, an artillery man, and Sergeants Paul Marshall and Rober Spielman), which would make the group too large. McCoy says that it's better for more people to be in the same group, so people, like the Aeta tribe (head-hunters), would hesitate to attack them. Shof argues it would be hard to handle bancas with so many people.

However, McCoy has navigation tables, and suggests using stars and a makeshift sextant to navigate. Furthermore, they have already shared their plans with each other. If the first group leaves, the chances of the second group leaving would be destroyed, as the Japanese would take measures to prevent it.

The party was finally increased to ten (with the addition of McCoy, Mellnik, Marshall, and Spielman)

=== Chapter 9 ===
Their conferences continued through February and March. They had to keep it secret from the Japanese, and also from the Americans (if the Japanese found out that an American soldier knew about an escape plan that they weren't even a part of, they would be punished; also because some American soldiers weren't even loyal to their other fellow soldiers!).

Last paragraph of page 90 – last paragraph of 91 (which continues onto page 92) shows the feelings of the soldiers who were forced to surrender, and the conditions they were in.

Page 91 – 92 shows how the prisoners changed. When they were at war, they worked together as a team, but when they became prisoners of war, they became selfish and greedy.

- Not all prisoners of war became selfish, however.
- But the low standards of comportment were used on such a broad scale that was impossible to overlook

Page 94 – first two full paragraphs of 96 shows why Americans are less permissive now in general; lack discipline. The Americans lost their self reliance.

- 3rd paragraph – 5th paragraph on page 96 shows how maternalism → selfishness.

Last paragraph of page 96 – end of chapter

- Cabanatuan “flayed the veneer of men”, showed what they truly had inside: selfishness and greed.
- Made Jack realize “how selfish, how yielding, how craven” some men could be
- On the other hand, however, Cabanatuan taught Jack how noble, humble, and loyal some men could be
  - “And it taught me this significant fact – that there was a way to inculcate in men the discipline, loyalty, spirit, mental stamina, and moral fortitude that were called for in the Japanese prison camps, no matter what their previous experience in society had been. It was the Marine Corps way.” (pp. 97)
  - The Marine corps maintained their integrity, but, as Jack questions, “Why should Marine Corps be any different” from the norms of society?
- Last paragraph of 97: “behavior pattern in prison camps varied in direct relation to the severity of the circumstances encountered”
  - Conditions worse at Cabanatuan → people were horrible and greedy
  - Conditions better at Davao → people are better, but the conspirators still couldn't risk leaking their plans (because there may still be those types of people around)

=== Chapter 10 ===
A crucial part of the plan was that four plowmen were sent on Sundays to feed the animals. The three marines were already plowmen, but they wanted the last remaining spot to be filled by one of the conspirators. That way, they could easily escape, and they could devise means for the other six to escape into the jungle (assuming they could avoid patrol).

- Supplies and equipment could be carried to the fields beforehand, as it was anyways customary to carry these things to the field for noon rest
- Problem to add a fourth person to the Sunday plow group because the current members could only be replaced if they were sick. Their hope lied on Shofner, who had just become assistant leader of the plowing group; through his influence, they trusted that one of the escape party members could be added if a vacancy occurred. Grashio was assigned the prospective fourth plowmen if this were to happen.
- Getting the other six men to get out of the compound was also a problem. McCoy comes up with an ingenious solution:
  - He was the leader of the coffee harvest detail, and asked to build a shed in the middle of the field to serve as shelter for the coffee pickers during noon resting periods
  - Once the shed started, he requested permission for “volunteers” (the remaining six) to continue working on the shed on Sundays, so as to not interfere with normal working hours. Maeda thought this was an intelligent plan, and granted McCoy's wish.
  - The remaining six could now come each Sunday, which would become a routine to which the guards would be accustomed to → guards won't pay attention to them
    - The reason guards didn't really pay attention to soldiers in the first place was that it seemed impossible for soldiers to escape, as south of the colony were many Japanese immigrants, who could easily report escapees to the Japanese army. Surrounding the colony on the other sides was a complete jungle.

Where they would go after they escaped was still in question. McCoy bonded with a man named Mr. Juan Acenas (Filipino agricultural supervisor of the colony) because Acenas was interested in the coffee harvest (McCoy worked in the coffee fields). Once he trusted Acenas enough, McCoy asked for advice on escaping the colony, though it would mean Acenas was risking his life and his family's life to help them.

- Acenas told them there was guerrilla activity against the Japanese in Mindanao. The closest guerrilla band was in the small barrio of Lungaog, twenty miles north. Here, they could ask for a banca to escape.
- Would be difficult because that area was extremely swampy. Two Routes
  - Through the Railroad connecting the north and south parts of the colony that continued north. Although it's more direct, it was heavily guarded by the Japanese at Anibogan.
  - Through a Jungle trail (probably unknown to the Japanese), which goes around the swamp and meets the railroad at its endpoint
- Decided to use the jungle trail. Acenas suggested to hire a Filipino convict as a guide to make it easier for them. Would be difficult because all convicts lived in a barrack separated from the soldiers barrack → no frequent contact.

Page 102 – 103: list of equipment and supplies needed for the journey.

Last paragraph of page 103 – 3rd paragraph of page 107: how they gathered their supplies. By early March, all the supplies had been gathered. They still had to assign Grashio to the 4th plowman and find a Filipino convict to guide them. They selected March 28th as a tentative date for the escape.

=== Chapter 11 ===
When they had given up finding a guide for the journey, Sam Grashio succeeded in finding not just one, but two guides. Sam worked in the camote field and talked to Benigno de la Cruz (a Filipino convict who was charged of homicide) while he was working. Ben had made it clear he wanted to part ways with the Japanese, whom he despised. In addition, he has had training in first aid and pharmacy, which could be a great help to the team. The second guide Sam found was named Victor, Ben's best friend in the colony. Victor was an expert woodsman who knew all about living in the jungle, and also knows the jungle trail to Lungaog (because he did work clearing it before the war). Ben and Victor became enthusiastic and valuable members of the escape party.

Finally, an opportunity came to put Sam in as the 4th member of the plow detail, because the original 4th member had malaria and couldn't work. That 4th member who got sick used to be the leader of the plow detail, but now Shof would serve as a temporary replacement. Shof suggested that they conduct a “dummy run”, or a rehearsal, of the escape.

- Shof arranged that Mike, Sam, and Jack would go with him to tend the animals
- McCoy, Dyess, and Mellnik would check out for work on their shed in the coffee fields.
- Boelens, Spielman, and Marshall wouldn't participate, as there was no need for all of them to run the risks involved
- Ben and Victor had been forewarned by Sam about where to meet the men and show them the start of the trail
- The soldiers had no problem arriving to the set location, but Ben and Victor had difficulty persuading the guards to leave their barrack.
- To reach the jungle, it was necessary to cross a road which ran through the banana grove near the shack and passed a Japanese guardhouse 300 yards distant.
- They walked about 500 yards into the trail before heading back. They came back bloody and covered with leeches. It wouldn't be an easy journey for any of them.
- After the dry run of the escape, the men returned to work, and Shof and Jack found a thicket to hide the equipment. All the men were confident the plan would work.

=== Chapter 12 ===
They commenced carrying the supplies they needed to the thicket on March 17, while trying to avoid suspicion. There were a few things that threw off their plans and made them more worried.

- One day, the men found Shof bleeding. He said that Hozumi and the guards found the smuggled bananas, and punished all the men (but he punished Shof more because he was in charge). Hozumi thought this was an attempt to get more food → didn't suspect the escape. However, the guards almost found the quinine bottle, which definitely would've aroused the suspicion of the escape → could've been severely punished.
- They found out that a man was brutally shot for asking a friend to bring him more water (which wasn't allowed…); later in a meeting, Maeda announced that this would happen to anyone who tried to escape → Rumors were spreading that more soldiers were being sent to the camp so that guards could be restored to all working parties → wouldn't prevent the plan from working, but would definitely make it harder to escape

McCoy suggested, and everyone agreed, that after the escape started and until the group was safe, they wouldn't wait for someone who was badly hurt or couldn't continue, as that could risk the safety of the entire group.

It was literally the DAY BEFORE the escape, and Hozumi gave an order saying all soldiers wouldn't participate in Sunday recreation and must work in the rice fields (as a punishment for smuggling fruit). That completely messes up their plans…

=== Chapter 13 ===
The only option was to postpone their escape, which all the men agreed upon. They then informed Ben and Victor that the plans were cancelled, so they would not unnecessarily attempt any dangerous rendezvous to the shack.

The men tirelessly work in the rice fields, and meet up again at night. They decide not to move the supplies from the thicket; doing so would be very risky, as there's a chance of being spotted. However, if the Japanese find the supplies in the thicket, they're screwed (also because the supplies have their names written on them…).

The 4th member of the plow detail who had malaria recovered, and insisted upon going to fend off the animals → Sam couldn't go anymore → the whole plan would basically be screwed. They faked a story to the general who had malaria, saying that they planned a special party to cook chicken and that the chickens would spoil if they didn't cook them immediately. The general believed this and allowed Sam to remain the 4th member. Finally, the day comes for the escape. The guards didn't notice anything and allowed them to go through the gate. They had to be quick, as there was Japanese patrol on the road not 200 yards from their location, and these guards knew the conspirators were there. They may come out to check on what they're doing.

They reached the start of the trail, but there was still no Ben and Victor (they were supposed to meet the men at the start of the trail). Finally, after an hour, Ben and Victor showed up, and the men continued on. They felt a sense of freedom as they walked along the trail. But walking through the piranha-infested swamp in the jungle was not fun, and one of the members would go on to get so exhausted they'd call for many unnecessary breaks.

=== Chapter 14 ===
The men walked along the trail and discussed their lives. They soon realized that the trail was becoming overgrown, and suspected they weren't even on the trail anymore. They were right and found out they were walking in circles. Victor said he lost the trail because he hadn't been on it in a long time.

They stopped for a quick meeting and decided they should follow a compass northeast to the railroad. However, they would have to cross directly through the swamp if they used this method. They decided to go for it and walked along logs (and occasionally used bolos to cut through the thick vegetation) that had formed bridges across several streams.

However, a couple of streams later, they reached the actual swamp. Jack began to suspect they were going in circles (McCoy rarely checked the compass to see if they were going in the right direction). Shortly before nightfall, they reached another stream and decided to rest. Jack, who had more experience with navigation while on the USMC, was assigned the new navigator. As the water got deeper and deeper, the men grew more exhausted and were near collapsing → decided to make camp until the next morning.

- Made a sleeping platform so that leeches won't attack them
- Wild bees attacked → they hid in the water; these bees could kill humans if they attacked in large swarms → the men had to be careful.

Victor wanted to retrace their steps back to the colony, and then restart the journey with a more planned route. Some agreed to this, while others thought they should follow their current route. They would decide after their sleep.

Suddenly, they heard splashing noises, which came from crocodiles. Then, they heard the sounds of firing not too far from their camp. They saw a distant flame, and concluded the Japs had set a house on fire. This meant they were probably on the railroad. They decided to rest until the following morning.

- The Japs were a signal of where the railroad was → the men could follow the attack to find the railroad
- Risky because they could risk getting caught, but at the moment they didn't care. They were too eager to escape the hellish swamp than think about getting caught.

McCoy says a prayer to hope that they make it out alive, and they all fall asleep.

=== Chapter 15 ===
The men wake up covered in mosquito bites, and eat breakfast before continuing their journey. Ben says wherever there's a Filipino house nearby, you can hear the cocks (chickens) crowing.

At last, the men finally found a trail, and Jack and Victor decided to follow it. They saw the railroad ahead, and concluded the Japanese had gone both directions along the railroad (from the footprints) → concluded they had gone back to the colony. They also found the remains of the ambush the night before.

Both Jack and Victor went back to camp, and the men decided they should end for the day because evening was approaching. In the morning, they started on the trail to Lungaog. They were certain the Japanese troops had gone back, but there still could've been patrol. The men knew the Japanese would be persistent in trying to attempt to kill or recapture them.

After a while, they reached a small village with water boiling and chickens crowing, but there weren't any people. Jack suggests the villagers fled to the woods because they thought the men were Japanese.

The men ate some of the veggies from the villagers' farms, and take some for the remaining journey. They continue along the trail, and finally meet a villager boy who is 15 years old and speaks Visayan, a principal Filipino dialect. Luckily Ben and Victor knew this, and talked with each other. The boy said Lungaog was 3 or 4 km away, and offered to guide them for the rest of the trip.

They were met by a band of armed Filipinos, who welcomed them after finding out the men weren't Japanese. They meet Casiano de Juan, Barrio Lieutenant (mayor) of Lungaog, who is also known as Big Boy. They were the ones who ambushed the Japanese, which was the firing they heard and the fire they saw in the forest.

Last sentence of page 150: one of Big Boy's men said that the men were meant to survive; “God was with you, sir…I aimed my rifle and pulled the trigger…But the rifle did not fire….it was a bad cartridge.”

=== Chapter 16 ===
Big Boy ensured the men were safe from the Japanese because of the very rural areas surrounding Lungaog. There were many refugees from Davao city to escape contact from the hated Japanese.

There were other guerrilla bands in Davao Province under the control of Captain Claro Laureta of the Philippine Constabulary, and these bands were a two-day march away. After learning the men's desires to reach the coast and sail to Australia, Big Boy recommends Laureta to them. He sends a message to Laureta notifying him of their presence.

In the meanwhile, McCoy refreshes Jack's navigation knowledge by giving him numerous navigation puzzles to solve.

Sergeant Baguilod of the Philippine scouts, Laureta's emissary who could speak excellent English, reached Lungaog. He guided the men to Laureta for the next two days. Three armed men searched them to check if they were actually American, and then Laureta arrived. The men tell him their escape plan.

Laureta says he can give them a good banca, but says it would be a difficult journey. He announces that he sent scouts to Mindanao, who reported that there was a large guerrilla organization there with many American officers. This organization has radio communication to Australia, and an American submarine had been there! McCoy was convinced they could leave the island by submarine. They decided to use this plan instead of their original one.

They reported this to Laureta, who then said he would arrange an escort for the men. They needed cargadores and at least 20 armed men to protect from man-hunting tribes. He would also send two of his most trusted scouts to guide them. The Filipinos would hold a fiesta in their honor. (Fiesta is on last paragraph of 159 – end of chapter on page 162).

=== Chapter 17 ===
After the fiesta, Laureta arranged supplies for their journey

- Cut chicken, dipped in vinegar, and sun-dried them, which would remain preserved for a long time for a steady food supply

Laureta decided to accompany them, as he had the most experience. They soon went to civilization surrounded by wilderness and made camp quickly. The next day Jack and Shof found themselves face to face with the Aetas (man hunters). They saw the Americans and turned back after a while. Laureta says the men should always stay by his side.

They made camp in an abandoned house that was left in fairly good condition. The next day after crossing the river and doing other grueling tasks, they faced the Manobos, who were like Aetas but more advanced.

The first settlement they reached in Mindanao was Loreto. Here they found a guerrilla band of about 50 people led by Lt. Antonio, who provided them with borotos (another type of boat) so that they could complete the journey through the river. After four days in the boats, the men reached Buena Vista. The commander of the guerrilla band there said the headquarters of the guerrilla organization were in the coastal town of Medina not too far to the west. He would provide a small sailboat to hold at most two men from the party; another larger boat would be sent later for the rest of the party. The two men who would go on the sailboat would be Shof and McCoy.

The rest of the men on Buena Vista relaxed, but Mike caught malaria. However, he quickly recovered because of the smuggled quinine. A few days later, the USS Athena came to Buena Vista, and the remaining men set sail.

Colonel Ernest McLish, along with Shof and McCoy, was on the beach to meet the men as they stepped shore at Medina. It had been almost six weeks since the group's escape.

=== Chapter 18 ===
McLish had been with the Philippine army regiment in Mindanao when Corregidor fell and the forces surrendered. He was very optimistic and warm. McLish suggested that they proceed directly to the headquarters to talk about the plan.

Jack confirmed if what Laureta said about the radio and the submarine was correct. “McLish has a radio, but he doesn't communicate directly with it to Australia. He relays through another station controlled by a Colonel Fertig in Misamis Occidental, the province west of here. McCoy and I have already sent messages to Fertig for relay to Australia.” He also confirmed that Laureta was right about the submarine being there not too long ago. Mike and Jack went to Mr. and Mrs. Thomas Reyes's house to eat a good meal, and then McLish sent them over brand new clothing.

Colonel Fertig was the overall guerrilla captain of Mindanao, and his radio line controlled all communication to Australia. Shop announced that he sent messages to Fertig requesting the entire party to be taken out as soon as possible.

The main Japanese forces in Mindanao were around Davao City.

“McLishexplained that all the ex-soldiers and civilians formed bands, though not all were interested in fighting the Japanese. Some of them turned out to be gangsters. Their goal was to eventually get all these bands under one command. “Guerrilla military operations were limited to raids, ambushes and sniping.” However, “McLish hoped to keep these bands alive because they served as a major source of intelligence for the forces in Australia.

=== Chapter 19 ===
Start of the chapter on page 181 – top of 182: Filipinos were fun-loving people; an example of this is the coronation of the Queen of May. Days passed by and the men still didn't get a follow-up message from Fertig. “McLish offered to provide transportation so that the men could go directly to Fertig to speak with him. McCoy, Mellnik, Ben, and Victor were to go.

Soon after the men left, they received word that the Japanese were planning an expedition against their headquarters. However “McLish was unalarmed, as rumors spread fast. Even if this were to happen, his troops would be notified even before the Japs arrive. This is because, in a few Filipino towns, some men had been chosen to act as spies to send warnings to the headquarters. Buckwheat (placing great distance between oneself and the enemy in the shortest possible time) was a term to describe the evacuation of some Filipinos.

Dyess and Boelens were set to travel to meet with Fertig shortly after McCoy and Mellnik left. Dyess suggested bringing Australian supplies through aircraft and constructing a landing strip on the flat coastal areas.

At this point, rumors were still spreading about the Japanese expedition, but McLish was still unalarmed. However, news spread that “enemy troops from Cagayan pushed eastward along the coast to their small garrison at Balingasag, only 25 miles from Medina.” Balingasag had been bombed by the Japanese → unrest among the people. Still, the men at the headquarters did not care. They were confident in the place's fortification → encouraged people to remain in their homes and continue normal life; they even attended a wedding in the meantime instead of buckwheating.

Things seemed to be getting normal in Medina until one night it was announced that a Japanese aircraft had landed on the island. Shof was about to open fire, but the guy in the aircraft turned out to be Sam, who had gone to the neighboring village to get supplies.

McLish returned the next day and congratulated the men for correctly handling the Balingasag situation. He suggested that they should leave soon, so the Japanese wouldn't find out where they were. They would plan to move out the next day to Daan Lungsod.

Shof entered Jack's room, perturbed. McCoy had sent a letter to him saying that Fertig hadn't sent any of their messages to Australia!

=== Chapter 20 ===
McCoy was mad that none of their messages were sent to Fertig and demanded the right to communicate with Naval Headquarters in Australia. Fertig had remained adamant to keep the men on Mindanao for some reason. After a lot of persuading, Fertig finally sent a message to Australia saying McCoy and Mellnik were set to leave, but didn't mention any of the other men who wanted to escape. MacArthur sent orders for McCoy and Mellnik to leave on the next submarine. After some discussion, they decide it's best for McCoy and Mellnik to go first so that they could take measures with appropriate naval authorities on the rest of the men's behalf.

This made the other men upset that they couldn't leave soon, but what was even more upsetting was the fact that none of their names were reported to Australia. This meant their families didn't know they were alive, and that they couldn't escape soon. They were upset, but decide McCoy would get them out safely as soon as possible.

Since they were to stay on Mindanao for a while, they offered to work for McLish's organization. McLish promoted them because of their diligence, meaning all the men had become officers in both the Marine Corps and the Army. Jack tested his new pistol, and hit the bullseye → gained a favorable reputation among the rest of the organization.

Word arrived from the west that the submarine and McCoy, Mellnik, and even Dyess had departed on board. Dyess interested Fertig with his idea of bringing air supply from Australia, so Fertig let him on board. Apparently when going to Fertig's headquarters, Boelens and Dyess had narrowly avoided an attack by the Japanese. They made it just in time to board the submarine, but Boelens stayed back to work on the airstrip. In the meanwhile, the remaining men would continue working for the guerrilla organization in Mindanao.

Upon reaching Australia, McCoy, Mellnik, and Dyess reported the atrocities of the Japanese against American and Filipino prisoners of war in the Philippines to General MacArthur.

=== Chapter 21 ===
They lost no time in plunging into guerrilla activity. Jack's troop was a ragged, barefoot army with a low supply of resources (guns, ammunition, fuel, etc.). The good thing was that they had a steady food supply.

During rice-harvesting season, the Japanese would attempt to cut off Filipino rice supply by seizing the grain for themselves → made Filipinos mad → increased support for guerrilla troops. Sometimes, the guerrilla troops could harass the Japs to the point where they would retreat. The troops also printed their own guerrilla money.

There was a short radio-wave receiver in the headquarters → could print newspapers and distribute to the public → would keep Filipino morale high. The worst part was that there was a huge lack of medicine → many soldiers fell sick through diseases such as gangrene → had to get limbs amputated without anesthetic. Malaria was also extremely common, killing much of the soldiers and civilian population.

The men in the troop were assigned different tasks. Mike and Sam created soap factories, shoe factories, and fuel distilleries. Sam was also assigned the job of stopping black market profiteering and hoarding.

- Jack focused his attention on learning more about the other islands. He found out that inter-island travel in the Philippines were doable through small sailboats. The Japanese just assumed these sailboats were for fishing purposes and did not attack.
- Many guerrilla organizations existed in the Philippines → Jack established many relationships with them to gain valuable military information.
- A few talented young Filipino navigators were hired to go on expeditions. They traveled to multiple islands and wrote reports on the status of the Japanese there. These reports were sent to Australia and would prove to be valuable information for MacArthur in planning for the Philippine invasion.
- Encouraged by the success of these ventures, they send three men to penetrate far-off Manila. Unfortunately one of the men died from malaria, but the other two carried on.

During these few months, the men felt secure, even though there were many dangers associated with being part of the organization. The danger of encirclement by Japanese landing parties was a common threat. One of these Japanese landings, that occurred on the town of Tubay, almost ended Jack's guerrilla service.

=== Chapter 22 ===
The Tubay incident started when McLish assigned Jack the mission of reconnoitering a town on Lake Mainit in the Surigao Province as a possible site for the new headquarters. They wanted new headquarters because Japanese attacks against the towns in Gingoog Bay were getting more frequent.

Mainit was completely abandoned, and after a quick inspection, Jack heads back to Tubay. He lives in the house of a Chinese merchant named Ong Oh. On the third day in Tubay, Jack fell extremely sick with malaria, to the point that he was too weak to leave bed. At this time, the Japanese came.

A Japanese gunboat landed on the shore of Tubay and started firing, so everyone left their houses in a rush. Jack was left behind in the bed. Thankfully, a Filipino officer named Jorge Tirador saved Jack. Jorge takes Jack in a boroto to his hut, where his family aids him by providing the necessary resources. Jack lost a lot of weight from the malaria.

For his astonishing act of courage, Jorge was awarded the Medal of Freedom, the highest civilian honor awarded by the Filipino Government. Jack sees a swarm of locusts at Jorge's hut completely destroy all his crops.

When Jack had recovered enough, he arranged with Jorge to travel back to Daan-Lungsod by banca. However, at that time, Mike arrived, thinking Jack was dead already. He also announced that the Japanese were all over Gingoog Bay.

=== Chapter 23 ===
Mike had been on the beach off the coast of Gingoog Bay, as he was supervising the repair of one of the diesel launches. Suddenly a Japanese warship arrived and began towing the launch. Mike opened fire on them with a rifle, but the gunboat was far too powerful → Mike left the battlefield. He returned to Daan-Lungsod by foot, where he saw people urgently preparing to move the headquarters. They decided to go to Linugos on the northeast shore of the bay, a fishing village they had not yet occupied.

They fled in the night, for the enemy ships reappeared and shelled Daan-Lungsod, Medina, and Gingoog. The men found out that the man guarding their ammunition was killed → their ammunition was captured.

Some of the men were on their own missions and did not come to Linugos. Shof announced that the Japs still maintained control over Medina and Gingoog, and recently landed in Anakan, just a few miles south of Linugos. Anakan was the location of the radio, but the men there had safely hidden the equipment so the Japs wouldn't find out.

The men and Linugos were eager to get the men out of Anakan ASAP → raided Japanese → Japanese withdrew from Anakan.

When Spielman returned from his mission from Surigao, he brough back a soldier named McCarthy. He announces that his daughter, Juanita, would be marrying Spielman soon, and the men congratulate him.

News arrived that a submarine came, and Sam left for Australia. The other men couldn't leave because they were at the wrong place…

- The men were concerned because McCoy still hadn't made arrangements with Fertig to make sure all of them went on the next submarine.

Shof was sure they would be able to board the next submarine, but they had to go to Fertig's location and stay with him. The men get ready to leave.

=== Chapter 24 ===
The men board the U.S.S. Athena and head to Balingasag, at the mouth of the Cagayan Bay. They see enemy ships and almost retreat, but the Japs merely thought the Athena was a fishing ship. Their journey safely ended at Misamis, and they proceeded to Fertig's headquarters. After discussion, the Shof, Mike, and Jack were cleared to board the submarine at Nasipit on November 15, which was extremely close to their headquarters.

The three marines meet Leo, Ben, and Victor for the first time in 5 months. They said McCoy had promised to personally petition President Quezon of the Philippines, then in the United States, to remit their sentences for homicide, in view of their valuable contribution to the men's escape. These pardons were granted.

Leo Boelens was suffering from severe dysentery, but was determined to finish the airstrip. This decision cost him his life, as a Japanese landing party made a surprise raid into the area, and Boelens was killed.

=== Chapter 25 ===
Several days before November 15th, Jack and Mike hiked from Rizal (headquarters) to Nasipit to check the depth of the channel where they wanted to dock their boat.

McLish commissioned Mike and Jack to lead an advance party to Nasipit early on the 15th in one of the trucks. The trucks stopped well before they reached the docks, but the men carried it all the way.

They boarded the submarine called the U.S.S. Narwhal, and met its captain Frank Latta. The submarine leaves Nasipit, and the men are now officially free.

- Last paragraph of page 224 (which continues onto 225) – shows what Jack has learned over the past two years as a prisoner of war.

=== Epilogue ===
USS Narwhal passed through the Surigao Strait into the Pacific and headed south for Australia. Near the port of Darwin, they almost got hit by enemy torpedoes, but narrowly escaped. The spent the night at Darwin, and the next day, a military aircraft flew them to Brisbane.

The men were escorted to a hospital. Jack and the others had a clean bill (no diseases), but Shof was diagnosed with amoebic dysentery, for which he was treated. They stayed at the hospital for two weeks. Since most of the men weren't sick, they were free to come and go from the hospital. One day they were summoned by General MacArthur, who awarded them with the Distinguished Service Cross to honor their escape from the Prisoner of War camps.

- Went from Brisbane → New Caledonia, where the USMC supply base provided the men with new clothing.
- On a PBY (naval plane), they went from New Caledonia → Funafuti in the Ellice Islands to catch a seaplane (B-24). However, a storm passed → couldn't even board the plane, so they decided to wait for the PBY to come back.
- They reached Pearl Harbor on the PBY, and found out the B-24 was lost at sea (good thing they didn't try to find it…). They met Chester Nimitz, Commander in Chief Pacific. He congratulated them on their escape
- Pearl Harbor → San Francisco. They enjoyed their time there and mainly relaxed.
- The Marine Corps Supply Depot in SF provided them with airline tickets to Washington, D.C. Shof reunited with his girlfriend, whom he later married and had three kids with. In DC, they stayed at a luxury hotel. They reported at the Marine Corps Headquarters and began the administrative tasks required
  - Collected back pay that they were owed for the past year and a half
  - Bought new uniforms including the insignia of their new rank. Mike and Jack promoted to major, and Shof promoted to colonel.
  - Jack called his long time fiancée, Rhea, whom he later married.

Jack was promoted to Lt. Col. He was awarded the Bronze Star Medal with combat V by the secretary of the navy for his strategic planning at the landing of Okinawa.

In August 1945, the bombings of Hiroshima and Nagasaki ended WWII. Jack and Rhea had a child of four months, but Jack was assigned to combat again in 1949. Promoted to the rank of colonel in 1955, he served ten more years in a variety of assignments. After 30 years in the USMC, he retired in 1965 at the age of 48.
