= Davao Prison and Penal Farm =

Penal settlement in Davao, Philippines

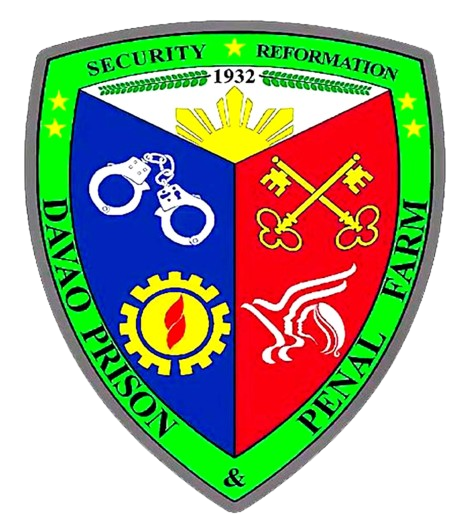
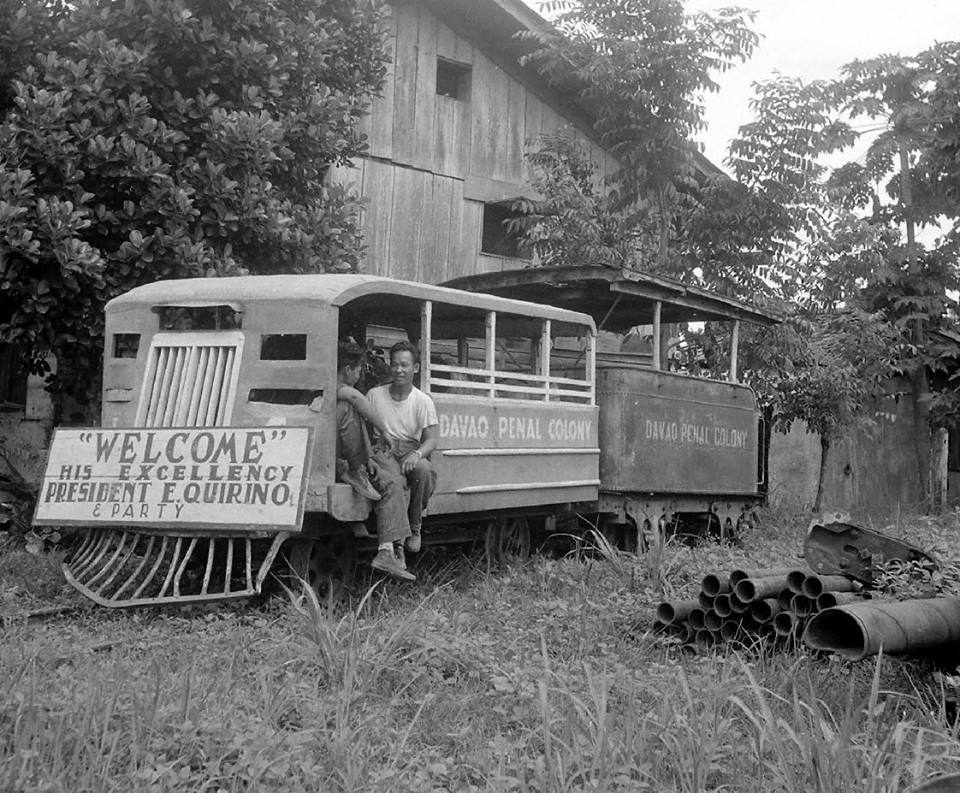
- Visit by President E. Quirino and party

- Location within Philippines
- Location: Carmen, Davao del Norte, Philippines; 7°24′58″N 125°37′11″E
- Status: Operational
- Opened: January 21, 1932
- Former name: Davao Penal Colony

Davao Prison and Penal Farm, formerly the Davao Penal Colony (DaPeCol), is a medium security prison located in Panabo City, Davao del Norte, Philippines. It has a land area of 30,000 hectares with a prison reservation of 8,000 hectares. Established on January 21, 1932, the Davao Penal Colony was the largest prison establishment in the country which the invading Japanese Army used as their imperial garrison during World War II.

== History ==
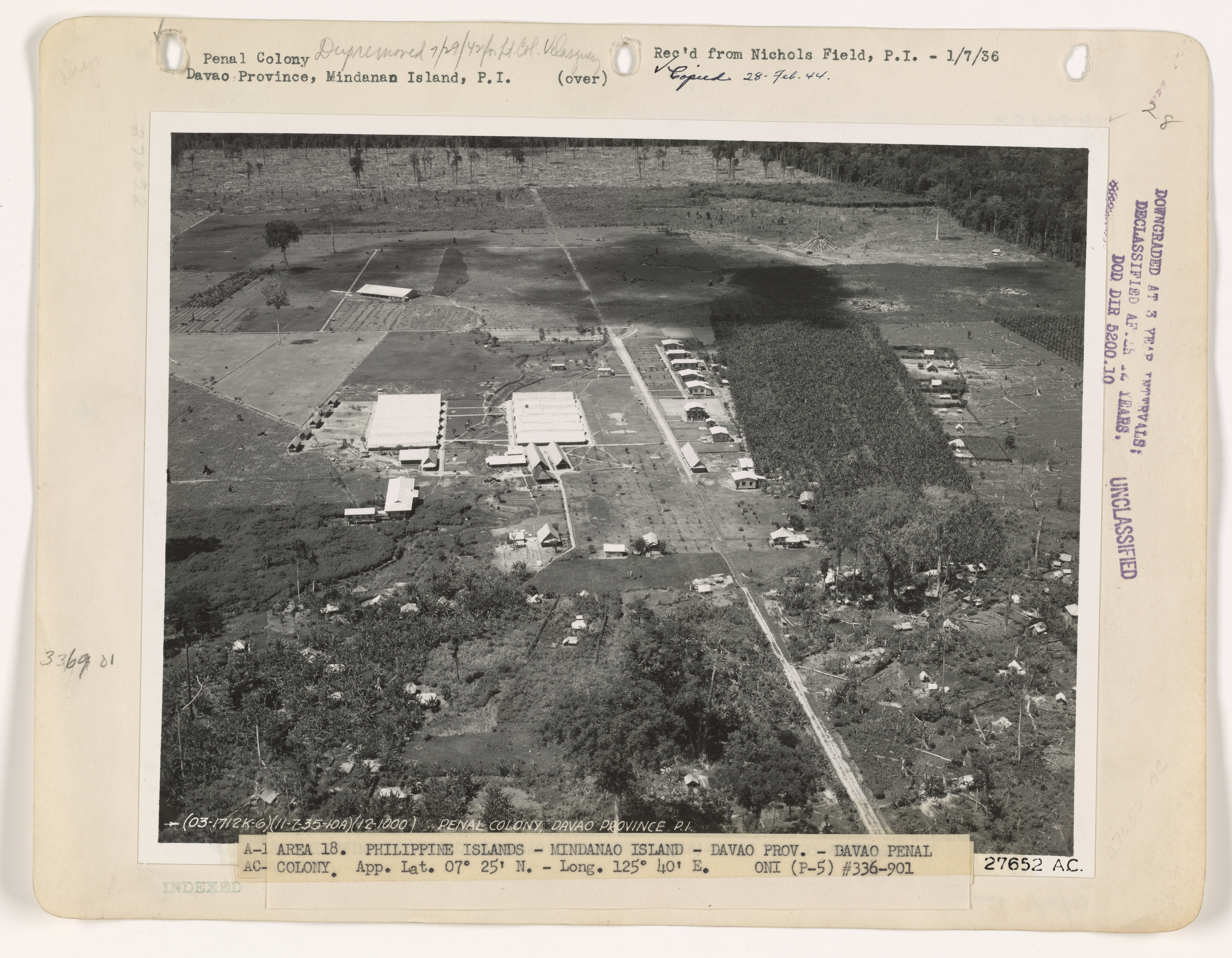
Aerial view of Davao Penal Colony, 1936

On October 7, 1931, Governor Dwight Davis signed proclamation 414 which reserved a site for Penal Colony in Davao Province in Mindanao and on January 21, 1932, the Davao Penal Colony was formally established under Act No. 3732. During World War II, it was used by the Philippine-American Armed Forces where more than 1,000 Japanese were treated in accordance with the orders of the American commanding officer. The Japanese Imperial Army attacked Davao on December 20, 1941, and the colony was among the establishments that were taken over by the Imperial Army.

=== American POW camp ===
Davao Penal Colony
- Concentration camp
- Location: Carmen, Davao del Norte, Japanese-occupied Philippines
- Operated by: Imperial Japanese Army
- Inmates: Prisoners of War
- Number of inmates: 2,000 (est.)

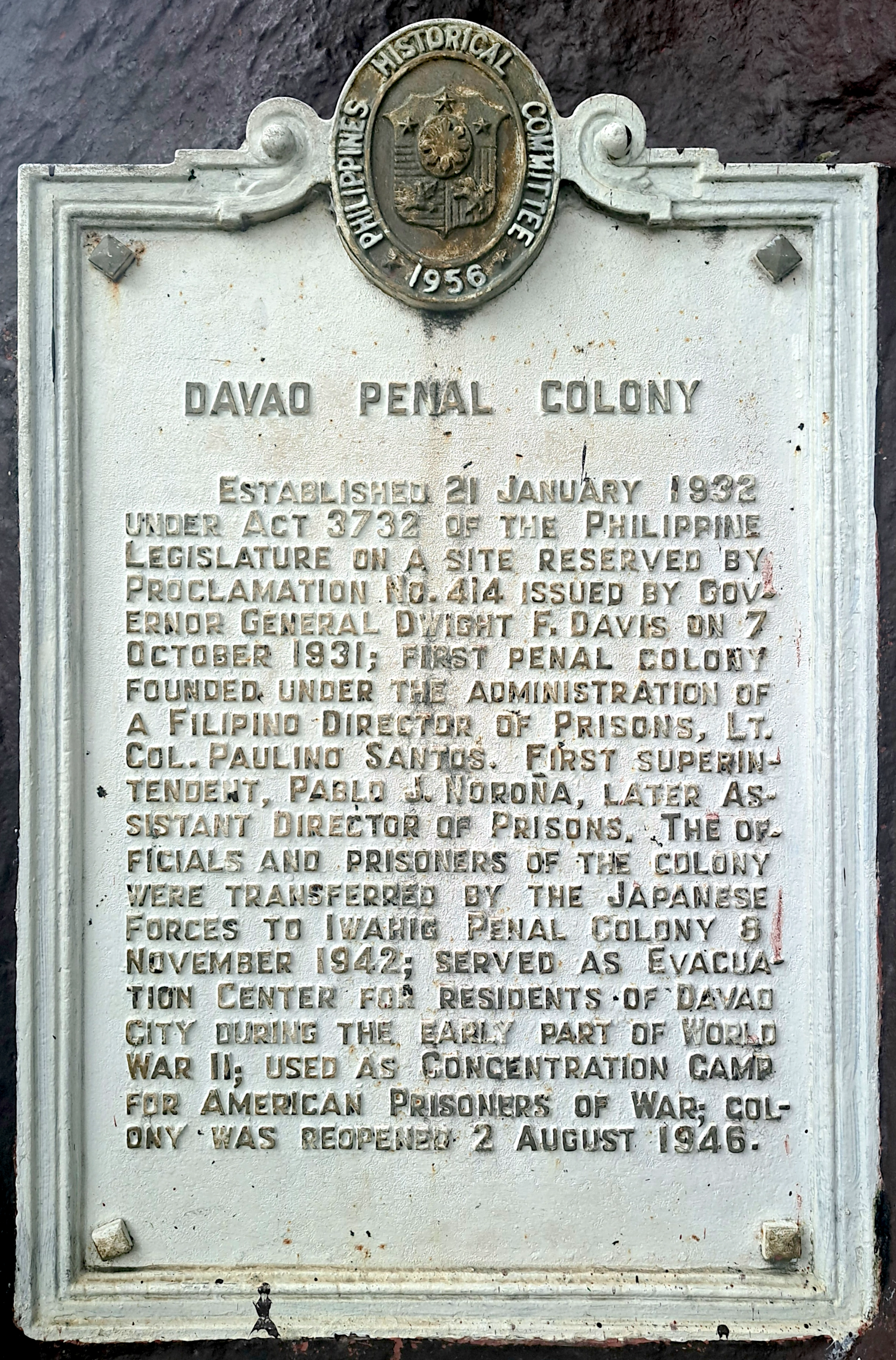
National historical marker installed in 1956

Approximately two thousand American prisoners were held in the penal colony after Japan's conquest of the Philippines in World War II. Some of the prisoners, survivors of the Bataan Death March, escaped in the Spring of 1943. When the twelve men (10 American POWs and 2 Filipino convicted prisoners) escaped, later joining Wendell Fertig's guerrillas, the Japanese beheaded twenty-five prisoners in DAPECOL. Major Stephen Mellnik, of Douglas MacArthur's South West Pacific Area, inserted the M1 S-X intelligence officer Capt. Harold Rosenquist into Mindanao in an attempt to rescue the Americans before they could be moved. However, the Japanese had already evacuated the camp, placing the American prisoners on a ship bound for Japan. However, that ship was sunk by an American submarine, and only eighty-three reached shore and were rescued by guerrillas.

== See also ==
- 1989 Davao hostage crisis
- William Dyess
- Jack Hawkins
- Samuel Grashio
- Austin Shofner
