= 1989 Davao hostage crisis =

Hostage-taking in Davao City, Philippines

- Location: 7°3′51.8″N 125°36′38.7″E; Davao Metrodiscom; Davao City, Philippines
- Date: August 13–15, 1989
- Target: Joyful Assembly of God members
- Attack type: Hostage crisis
- Weapons: M16 rifle M6 rifle knives
- Deaths: 21 (5 hostages and 16 prisoners)
- Perpetrator: Wild Boys of DaPeCol
- Motive: Prison transfer Prisoner abuse

On August 13, 1989, 16 inmates at the Davao Metropolitan District Command Center (Davao Metrodiscom), who had previously escaped from the Davao Penal Colony, captured 15 members of a Protestant group, the Joyful Assembly of God. The inmates were part of the prison gang called the Wild Boys of DaPeCol, led by Felipe Pugoy and Mohammad Nazir Samparani. The hostage crisis ended with the deaths of five hostages and all 16 inmates.

== Background ==
=== April 1989 DaPeCol hostage taking ===
On April 2, 1989, Felipe Pugoy and his prison gang the "Wild Boys of DaPeCol" staged a hostage-taking at the Davao Penal Colony (DaPeCol). Pugoy's group of 14–15 convicts each took a hostage. The group armed with knives overcame the prison guards and escaped with a jeepney. Troops from the Philippine Constabulary along with helicopters intercepted Pugoy's group 120 kilometres (75 mi) from the prison. House Speaker Ramon Mitra Jr. and Senator Santanina Rasul were with the government negotiators. Pugoy's group demanded a plane to Manila to engage in dialogue with then-President Corazon Aquino to request a transfer to the National Penitentiary in Muntinlupa due to alleged abuse by DaPeCol prison officials. It was agreed to by both parties that the negotiations were to be continued in Davao City.

During negotiations on the night of April 3, the gang reiterated their demand for a plane. Hours later 13 hostage-takers released their hostages and peacefully surrendered while Pugoy and the other leader Ricardo Navarro held on to their hostages, two teenage girls. The convicts who surrendered were temporarily held in the Davao City Jail. The final demand of Pugoy was to see his mother, which the military reportedly agreed to. The final two hostage takers reportedly surrendered after they were promised a transfer to the National Penitentiary and were detained along with the rest of the convicts. Most of the convicts were eventually transferred to the Davao Metrodiscom. The promise of a transfer to the National Penitentiary was denied due to the hostages filing charges of kidnapping against their former captors.

== Events ==
Key facts to the hostage crisis
Hostage Takers	Timeline
Wild Boys of DaPeCol (16 individuals); Felipe Pugoy / Mohammad Nazir Samparani (Hostage leaders)	August 13; 4:30 p.m. – Hostage taking begins, hostage takers demand a dialogue with Cong. Mitra and Sen. Rasul; August 14; 3:00 p.m – First deadline lapses. The hostage takers extend the deadline to the following day and demand a bus for them to leave the prison. August 15; 10:35 a.m. – The prisoners attempt to leave the prison using the hostages as human shields. Gunshots fired by the prisoners. 3:00 p.m. – Soldiers storm the prison after firing tear gas.
Negotiators	August 13; 4:30 p.m. – Hostage taking begins, hostage takers demand a dialogue with Cong. Mitra and Sen. Rasul; August 14; 3:00 p.m – First deadline lapses. The hostage takers extend the deadline to the following day and demand a bus for them to leave the prison. August 15; 10:35 a.m. – The prisoners attempt to leave the prison using the hostages as human shields. Gunshots fired by the prisoners. 3:00 p.m. – Soldiers storm the prison after firing tear gas.
Silvestre Bello III; Justice Undersecretary; Douglas Cagas; Davao del Sur Governor; Brig. Gen. Mariano Baccay; Southern Mindanao regional commander Lt Col. Franco Calida; Davao Metrodiscom Chief Rodrigo Duterte; Davao City Mayor Jesus Dureza; Davao 1st district Representative	August 13; 4:30 p.m. – Hostage taking begins, hostage takers demand a dialogue with Cong. Mitra and Sen. Rasul; August 14; 3:00 p.m – First deadline lapses. The hostage takers extend the deadline to the following day and demand a bus for them to leave the prison. August 15; 10:35 a.m. – The prisoners attempt to leave the prison using the hostages as human shields. Gunshots fired by the prisoners. 3:00 p.m. – Soldiers storm the prison after firing tear gas.
Hostages: 15 (From the Joyful Assembly of God, inc. Jacqueline Hamill)

On August 13, 1989, 16 convicts including leaders Pugoy and Mohammad Nazir Samparani, a former sergeant from the Philippine Air Force who was dismissed from service in a 1976 hostage crisis, took 15 members of the Joyful Assembly of God as hostage. All but one of the convicts were part of the Wild Boys of DaPeCol. The Protestant group had conducted a prayer service at the prison shortly before being taken hostage.

The Wild Boys took the hostages to protest against prison conditions and demanded to speak with Congressman Ramon Mitra Jr. and Senator Nina Rasul. Both politicians declined the demand saying that the crisis must be dealt with by the military negotiators.

By August 15, the inmates reportedly surrendered after being promised to be transferred to a prison in Manila. Gunshots were fired as inmates crossed a chain-link fence along with the hostages, some of whom were able to escape while the rest were dragged back into the prison. According to one of the captives who escaped, nine of the hostages, including the Australian missionary Jacqueline Hamill, were raped by the inmates. This led the military to storm into the prison later that day after the hostage-takers continued to refuse to cooperate.

The hostage crisis was resolved by a combined police and military intervention, which was able to rescue 10 hostages. The end of the crisis saw the deaths of five hostages, including Hamill, as well as all 16 hostage takers. It is unclear if the five deaths among the hostages was a consequence of the intervention or if it was an act committed by the inmates.

== Aftermath ==
The survivors of the hostage crisis were put into military custody immediately after the crisis was resolved. Reporters were barred from interviewing the survivors raising speculation of a coverup. Brig. Gen. Mariano Baccay, one of the negotiators, said that the survivors were still recovering from shock caused by the incident. It was reported that photographers covering the event witnessed a soldier delivering a coup de grace to a wounded inmate hostage taker.

=== Investigation ===
Committee on Defense chairman, Senator Ernesto Maceda sent a team led by Gen. Felix Brawner to Davao City to investigate and interview the negotiators involved. The team was also reportedly led by Popemyo Vasquez.

The team concluded that there were no efforts to maintain adequate security measures in the 80-inmate capacity detention facility. The small number of jail guards at the time of the hostage crisis led them to become "more familiar and easy" on the inmates. The team found that this led to the sole security guard, CIC Antonio Alcazar, to be compromised by the prisoners who took his M-16 ArmaLite rifle.

Maceda and Vasquez' team also describe the approach of the joint Regional Special Action Force-Davao Metrodiscom team on the assault and rescue operations during the hostage crisis as being conducted with "decisiveness and professional competence". Maceda noted the lack of training of local civilian officials in handling the crisis and expressed surprise at their decision to give a shoot-to-kill order against the hostage takers.

Furthermore, the team ruled out that Hamill was killed by military sniper following an autopsy report. The investigators also learned that the hostage-takers were adamant about releasing Hamill during the negotiations saying that the she was their "trump card". The decision to conduct an assault followed the attempt of the hostage takers to escape from the prison and that delaying the operation would risk the lives of the five hostages still in the prisoners' custody. A delay would also give the prisoners an opportunity to escape the prison compound at night. The shooting by the rescue and assault team was also found to be deliberate with 7 either dead or wounded in a wide area among a circle of 30 people.

Finally, the team recommended that the military review the security measures in all detention centers and the training of personnel tasked to handle detainees. The rules of entry of visitors to prisons and other detention centers was also proposed to be reviewed and modified.

=== Death of Jacqueline Hamill ===
The death of Jacqueline Hamill, an Australian missionary, received relatively more attention. A medical examination by the Davao Doctors Hospital described the cause of victim's death as "a gunshot wound from the back of the left chest region exiting near the collarbone" contradicting early reports that she was killed by a slashed throat. The doctors concluded that Hamill had an instantaneous death, dying during the attempted escape of the prisoners in the morning on August 15.

An autopsy conducted on Hamill's corpse found that the fatal bullet that hit the missionary had an upward trajectory and could not have been caused by a military sniper which had an elevated position.

The body of Hamill was retrieved hours after her death. According to survivors, Hamill along with Pugoy were wounded as early as the 10:30 a.m. gunfight on August 15. At around 3:15 p.m, some minutes after the troops stormed in the prison, Major Nonito Serrano found Hamill wounded and brought her into the adjoining administration building. Hamill was brought to the Davao Doctors Hospital through a Red Cross ambulance. Hamill was declared dead on arrival.

Jacqueline Hamill, a twin, was one of the 10 children of Ray and Jean Hamill of Strahan, Tasmania. She grew up along the West Coast of Tasmania.

Hamill was a member of Christian City's Girraween Pentecostal church in New South Wales which had been sending missionary groups of 30–40 people to the Philippines since 1986. She went to the Philippines as an independent missionary without formal backing from her church and taught prisoners at the Davao Metrodiscom (now Davao City Police Office). Hamill was invited to conduct missionary work at the facility for six months. She left Sydney, where she had resided for three to four years, for the Philippines on July 15, 1989. Hamill's parents discouraged her to go to the Philippines but she insisted on going due to having "a calling" to the Philippines. She had been teaching at the facility for a month before the hostage-taking incident. At the time of her death on August 15, 1989, she was 36 years old.

=== Reactions ===
==== Domestic ====
President Corazon Aquino expressed sadness following the incident's aftermath. She absolved the military personnel involved in the crisis of charges.

Silvestre Bello, another negotiator, said that the hostage-takers said they wanted to escape due to abuse from prison officials. He said that they claimed that three of their companions had their ears chopped off by prison officials and also added that they demanded to be transferred to the National Penitentiary in Muntinlupa. He said there would be no hesitations to impose sanctions on prison officials involved if the investigation warranted such action. Bello also defended the military's action saying that the prisoners were determined not to be taken alive.

The mayor of Davao at the time, Rodrigo Duterte (who later became President of the Philippines) was among the civilian officials who were part of the negotiating team. Duterte slammed the criticism of the military intervention by the investigation team led by Maceda saying that the military assault was the "only civilized option available to government at the time." He also added that the decision to launch the action was "collective". He described the death of the 5 hostages as "most unfortunate" and added that the order was to save lives and to apprehend the hostage-takers but that they would be shot if they resisted.

==== Australia ====
Australian Prime Minister Bob Hawke and Foreign Minister Gareth Evans were blamed by Hamill's parents saying that they were "too concerned about their budget to care". The Hamills also criticized the Philippine military's decision to storm the prison.

Evans initially said that the Philippine government couldn't be blamed for the incident. He later said that Jacqueline Hamill may have been killed by a sniper from the military following a finding by the Davao Doctors Hospital contrary to earlier reports that she was killed by slashed throat.

Philippine authorities were urged by Evans to investigate to determine the source of Hamill's fatal wound and have those responsible charged. The Australian embassy in Manila was directed by its foreign ministry to submit a complete report on the incident.

== Depictions in media ==
A film about the August 1989 hostage incident, Pugoy – Hostage: Davao, was released in 1993. The film starred Ian Veneracion as Felipe Pugoy, Lito Legaspi as Mayor Rodrigo Duterte (portrayed as Mayor Duwalde or Antonio Duwalde in the film) and Gina Pangle as Jacqueline Raye Hamill (portrayed as Jennie Copper became the missionary in the film). A comic published in 2015 entitled Digong: Ang Kanlungan ng mga Inaapi at Inaabuso (lit. Digong: The Refuge of the Oppressed and Abused) by KC Cordero and JM Estrabela, illustrated by Karl Comendador which narrated an account of the April and August 1989 hostage incidents involving Davao City Mayor, Rodrigo Duterte.

In 2019 it was featured in the biopic Bato: The General Ronald dela Rosa Story.

== 2016 presidential elections ==
=== Alternate account ===
Another account of the hostage involves Rodrigo Duterte, who was reportedly the Chairman of the peace and order council at the time. He reportedly came to the prison after the President Corazon Aquino tasked him to check on the situation at the prison. Duterte negotiated with Pugoy and offered himself in exchange for two hostages — a woman and a three-month-old baby. The Wild Boys were convinced by Duterte to take him and the rest of the hostages to the Davao City Hall where they stayed.

The hostage-takers, except for Pugoy and three other individuals, surrendered after some time. Duterte claimed that he was planning to shoot at the remaining four until Congressman Jesus Dureza intervened. Dureza informed then-President Corazon Aquino of Duterte's plan who, in turn, called Duterte and asked him to resolve the hostage situation peacefully.

=== Comments by Duterte ===
In 2016, 27 years after the incident, Duterte made remarks in one of his campaign rallies relating to the 1989 hostage crisis and the raping of the Australian missionary. Duterte made the controversial joke on April 12, when he talked to a crowd about Australian missionary Jacqueline Hamill who had been kidnapped, raped and killed in 1989 and said, "She was so beautiful. I thought, the mayor should have been first." This caused outrage from human rights and women's rights advocates, as well as his presidential campaign rivals which condemned Duterte remarks as insensitive. Duterte claimed to have ordered the storming of Davao Metrodiscom during the April 1989 hostage incident. Duterte apologized for the way he spoke but insisted the remark was not a "joke" as reported by some media outlets and that he had spoken the remark in a narrative and out of "utter anger" when he recalled the incident.
