= Jacob Esterline =

American project director (1920–1999)

Jacob Donald Esterline (April 26, 1920 in Lewistown, Pennsylvania – October 16, 1999) was the CIA project director for the Bay of Pigs Invasion.

== Early life ==
Jacob was the son of John Newton Esterline (May 13, 1893 - ?) and Elisabeth Showers (17 May 1894 - Feb 1970). He enrolled at Temple University as an accounting major in 1938. He enlisted in the U.S. Army Air Corps on July 25, 1941 in Pennsylvania. He was accepted in US Army Officer Candidate School in 1941 at Fort Benning, Georgia. He was recruited to join Office of Strategic Services (OSS) during World War II. Beginning in 1943, he served in India and Burma. He was commander of a guerilla battalion in China fighting the Imperial Japanese Army by the end of World War II.

== Post-World War II ==
He completed his accounting degree after World War II, and joined a Pennsylvania law firm. When the Korean War began, he joined the Central Intelligence Agency. He became a guerilla warfare instructor at the CIA training facility known as "The Farm" (Camp Peary) at Williamsburg, Virginia. He was deputy chief of the CIA task force for operation PBSuccess which overthrew Jacobo Arbenz in 1954, the President of Guatemala. He was CIA station chief in Guatemala, Venezuela and Panama. Jacob Esterline's first child was a boy, who has his father's namesake.

== Bay of Pigs Invasion ==
During the preparation and operation of the Bay of Pigs Invasion of Cuba in April 1961, Jacob Esterline was CIA Chief of Western Hemisphere Branch 4 (WH/4), reporting to the CIA Deputy Director for Plans Richard M. Bissell Jr. and his deputy Tracy Barnes, rather than to the Chief of Western Hemisphere, J.C. King.

On the day before the first action, Esterline and Marine Col. Jack Hawkins (also CIA, WH/4/PM) both strongly thought that the impending invasion should be called off because last-minute changes in the plan would guarantee disaster, and wanted to resign. Bissell convinced them to stay on board.

== Post-Bay of Pigs invasion ==
Jacob Esterline was chief of the CIA's Miami, Florida office from 1968 to 1972, and deputy chief of the CIA Western Hemisphere division. He retired from the CIA in 1978, and died at Hendersonville, North Carolina in 1999.

== See also ==
- Bay of Pigs invasion
- Richard M. Bissell Jr.
- Porter Goss
- Guillermo Hernández-Cartaya
- E. Howard Hunt
- Grayston Lynch
- Operation 40
- David Atlee Phillips
- Félix Rodríguez
- Frank Sturgis
- White House Plumbers

== Sources ==
- Kornbluh, Peter (1998). Bay Of Pigs Declassified. The New Press. ISBN 978-1565844940.
