= George Preddy =

American World War II flying ace

George Preddy Jr.
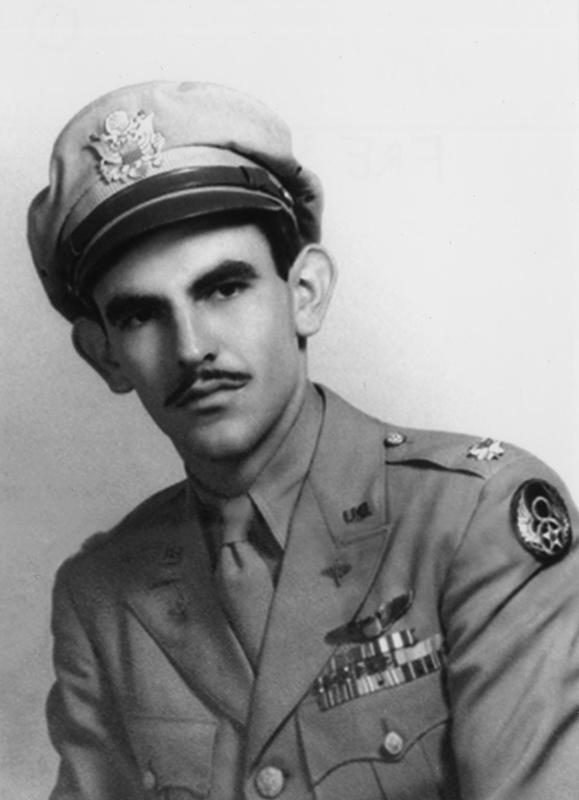
- Born: February 5, 1919; Greensboro, North Carolina, U.S.
- Died: December 25, 1944 (aged 25) near Liège, German-occupied Belgium
- Burial place: Lorraine American Cemetery
- Military career
- Allegiance: United States
- Branch: United States Army Air Forces
- Service years: 1941–1944
- Rank: Major
- Nickname: "Ratsy"
- Units: 49th Fighter Group; 352nd Fighter Group
- Commands: 328th Fighter Squadron
- Conflicts: World War II
- Awards: Distinguished Service Cross; Silver Star (2); Distinguished Flying Cross (7); Purple Heart; Air Medal (7)

George Earl Preddy Jr. (February 5, 1919 – December 25, 1944) was a United States Army Air Forces officer during World War II and a flying ace credited with 26.83 enemy air-to-air kills (a number that includes shared one-half and one-third victory credits), ranking him as the top P-51 Mustang ace of World War II and eighth on the list of highest scoring American aces.

== Early life ==
Preddy was born in 1919 in Greensboro, North Carolina, the second of four children born to George Earl Sr. and Clara Noah Preddy. He attended Aycock School and Greensboro High School. After graduation, he worked at a cotton mill and attended Guilford College for two years before becoming a barnstormer pilot.

== Military career ==
In September 1940, he enlisted in the North Carolina National Guard and served with the 252nd Coast Artillery Regiment. Preddy attempted to become a naval aviator in the U.S. Navy, but was rejected thrice. As a result, he entered the Aviation Cadet Program of the U.S. Army Air Corps on April 29, 1941. He was commissioned a second lieutenant in the U.S. Army Air Forces and was awarded his pilot wings at Craig Field in Alabama, on December 12, 1941, just five days after the Japanese attack on Pearl Harbor.

=== World War II ===
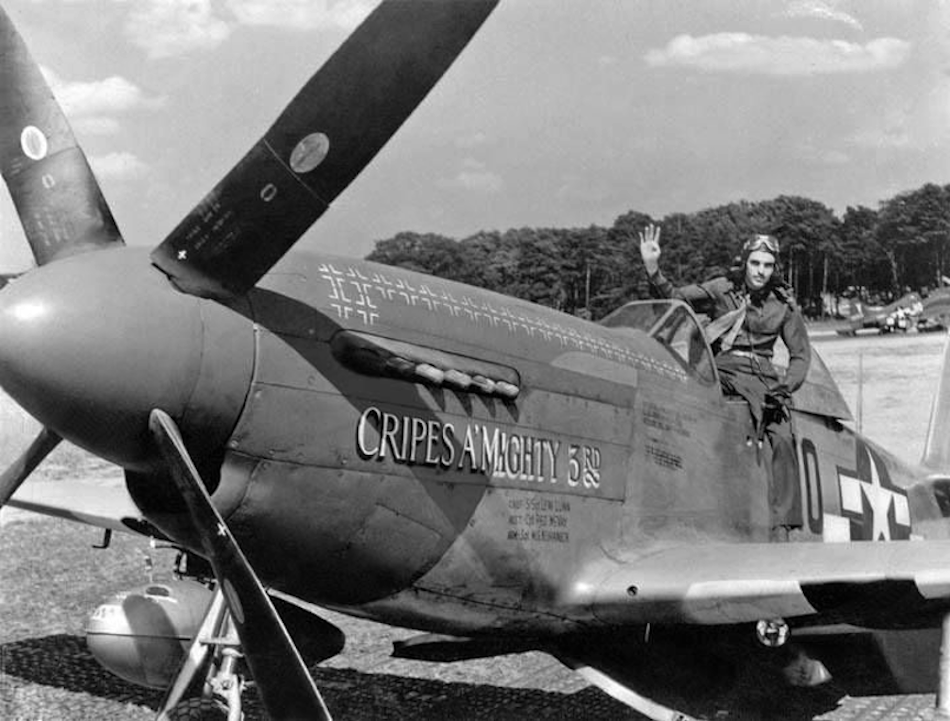
Major George E "Ratsy" Preddy Jr. of the 352nd Fighter Group in the cockpit of his P-51 Mustang (HO-P, serial number 44-13321) nicknamed Cripes A' Mighty 3rd

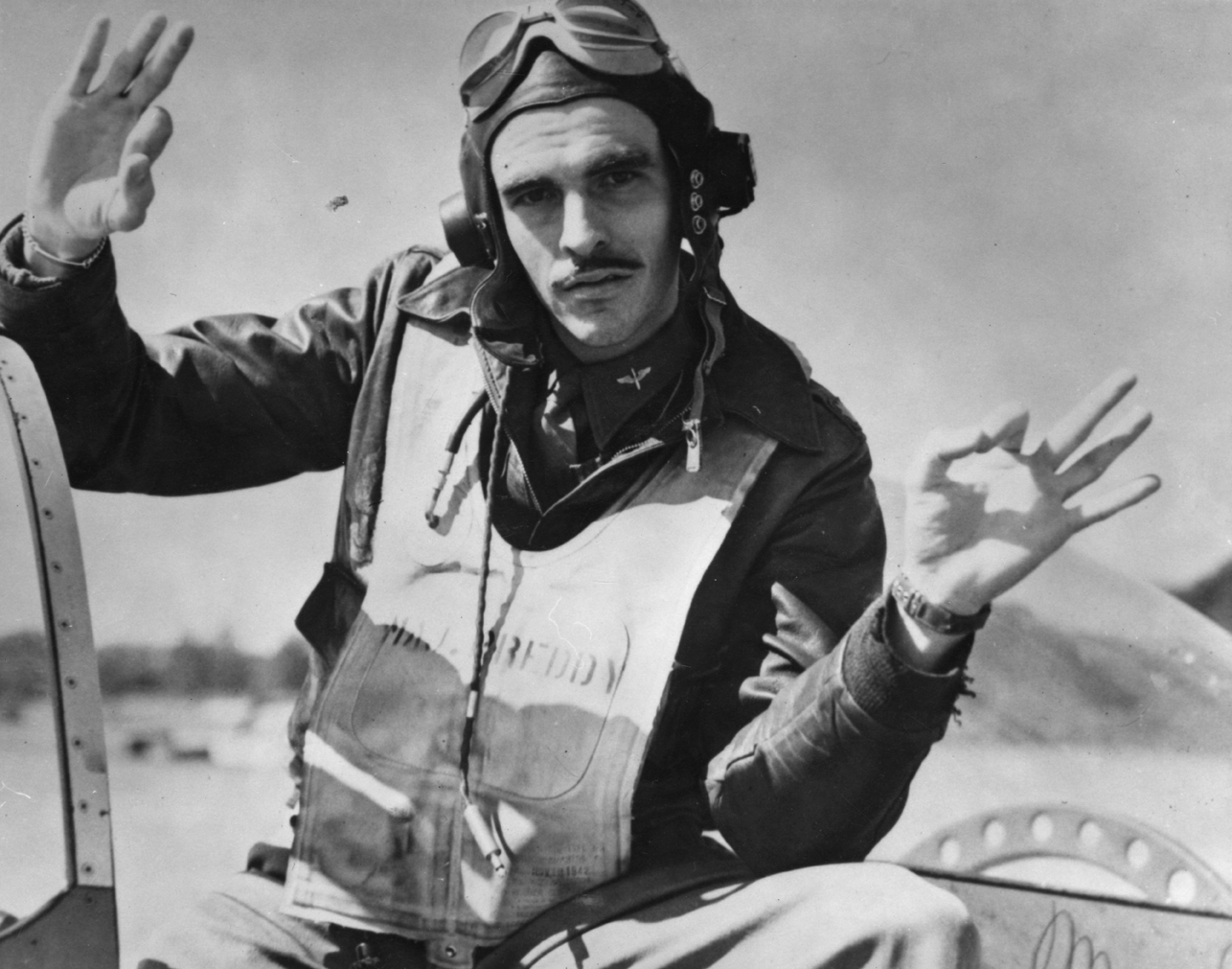
Preddy hold up hands for six enemy aircraft he shot down on 6 August 1944 mission.

Preddy was assigned as a P-40 Warhawk pilot with the 9th Pursuit Squadron of the 49th Pursuit Group, which provided air defense against Japanese aircraft attacking Darwin, Australia. Preddy claimed two Japanese aircraft damaged over Darwin. He was hospitalized after a midair collision with another P-40, in which the other pilot, 2nd Lt. John Sauber, was killed. After his recovery, he arrived at Hamilton Field in California, looking for an assignment. In December 1942, following recommendation by I. B. Donalson, who served in the 49th FG with Preddy in Australia, he was sent to Mitchel Field in New York and later to Westover Field in Massachusetts, where he was assigned to the 487th Fighter Squadron of the 352nd Fighter Group, flying P-47 Thunderbolts. On June 30, 1943, the 352nd FG boarded the troopship RMS Queen Elizabeth. The group landed in the United Kingdom and was assigned to RAF Bodney in Watton, Norfolk, under the operational control of the 67th Fighter Wing, VIII Fighter Command.

Preddy flew his first European combat mission in September 1943 and on October 14, 1943, he took part in the Second Schweinfurt raid but was forced to turn back from the mission along with 196 other P-47 pilots due to near-empty fuel tanks. On December 1, 1943, he shot down a Bf 109, his first aerial victory. On December 22, he led his flight in breaking up an attack by Me 210s against a straggling B-24 Liberator; he shot down one of the twin-engine fighters and lured the remaining ones away, for which he received the Silver Star.

On January 29, 1944, the 352nd FG escorted a formation of 800 bombers returning after targeting industrial complexes in Frankfurt. Over the French coast, Preddy shot down an Fw 190 but was hit by enemy flak. After he bailed out over the English Channel, his wingman Lt. William T. Whisner circled over Preddy, his fuel dwindling as he repeatedly radioed Preddy's location while air-sea rescue arrived. A Royal Air Force flying boat arrived and attempted to rescue Preddy, but struck him with a pontoon in the rough seas. The bruised Preddy was hauled aboard, but a broken pontoon left the aircraft unable to take off. A Royal Navy launch eventually towed the aircraft to the English coast.

In April 1944, the 352nd FG converted to North American P-51 Mustangs. Preddy became a flying ace when he shot down two Bf 109s during a bomber escort mission to Neubrandenburg on May 13. On June 20, while escorting bombers to Magdeburg, he shot down a Fw 190 and shared in the destruction of an Me 410 with another airman. From June 12 to August 5, he had nine aerial victories.

His biggest day came on August 6, 1944. Despite suffering from a hangover during a war bond party on the previous day, Preddy led his squadron on a bomber escort mission over Hamburg, Germany. As they reached the target, the bombers were attacked by a formation of Bf 109s. As the Bf 109s did not notice the escorting P-51s, Preddy led an attack against the Bf 109s from astern and shot down two of them. Preddy shot another two Bf 109s before the Germans began to escape after realising they were being attacked. As the Americans continued to follow them, Preddy shot down a fifth Bf 109. As the fighters descended to 5000 ft, Preddy shot down a sixth Bf 109, making him one of the 38 USAAF pilots to become an "ace in a day". For his actions in the mission, Preddy was nominated for the Medal of Honor, the highest American military award, by his squadron commander John C. Meyer. On August 12, Preddy was awarded the Distinguished Service Cross in recognition for his actions during the August 6 mission. After the mission, Preddy returned to the United States for a 30-day stateside tour.

On October 28, 1944, he returned to England and was assigned as commanding officer of the 328th Fighter Squadron within the 352nd Fighter Group. He was provided with a brand new P-51D-15NA and on November 2, he led the squadron on the bomber escort over Merseburg, Germany. During the mission, he shot down a Bf 109 using the P-51's K-14 gunsight while the remainder of his squadron shot down 24 enemy aircraft, setting an Eighth Air Force record for aerial victories by a squadron in a single mission. The following day, he shot down a Fw 190. During the Battle of the Bulge, which started on December 16, the 352nd FG was moved forward to airfield Y-29 near Asch, Belgium. The pilots flew aerial patrols, ground attack, and reconnaissance missions to support the Allied ground forces.

==== Death ====
George Preddy was killed on the morning of December 25, 1944, by friendly fire. He was leading a formation of 10 P-51s and after patrolling for about three hours, they were directed to help in a dogfight already in progress. Preddy destroyed two Bf 109s (Note: Bf 109G-14/AS Werk.No.784111 "Yellow 6" of Uffz. Heinrich Zinnen, killed, and Bf 109G-14 Werk.No.785758 "Yellow 9" Fw. Karl Heinz Schröder, wounded) before being vectored to intercept a lone Focke-Wulf Fw 190 strafing Allied ground forces southeast of Liège, Belgium. As he pursued the Fw 190, Preddy's aircraft as well as two other P-51s passed over the Allied front line at treetop height. A US Army anti-aircraft (AA) battery (believed to be part of the 430th AA Battalion, XIX Corps) fired at the Fw 190 but instead hit Preddy's P-51. Preddy managed to release his canopy but was unable to bail out before his aircraft hit the ground at high speed. Although the shallow angle of impact meant the crash was potentially survivable, his wounds from .50-caliber machine gun fire were mortal. He was buried at the Lorraine American Cemetery, Saint-Avold, France.

Preddy was credited with the destruction of 26.83 enemy aircraft in aerial combat plus 4 shared destruction and 5 destroyed on the ground while strafing enemy airfields. While serving with the 352nd FG, he flew P-47 and P-51s bearing the name "Cripes A'Mighty". Initially, the United States Air Force Fighter Victory Credits Board in the 1950s reduced his aerial credits to 25.83 before Preddy's first cousin Joe Noah challenged the change after discovering that the board disallowed one of Preddy's aerial victories for which he received his first Silver Star. In 1978, the USAF corrected the error when another board was convened, officially crediting Preddy with 26.83 aerial victories.

Preddy's brother William was a P-51 pilot with the 503rd Fighter Squadron, 339th Fighter Group, credited with destroying one enemy airplane in aerial combat. William died in what is today's Czech Republic on April 17, 1945, from wounds he sustained when he was shot down by enemy AA fire while strafing České Budějovice airfield. He was buried alongside George at the Lorraine American Cemetery.

== Aerial victory credits ==
Chronicle of aerial victories
| Date | # | Type | Location | Aircraft flown | Unit Assigned |
|---|---|---|---|---|---|
| December 1, 1943 | 1 | Messerschmitt Bf 109 | Rheydt, Germany | P-47D Thunderbolt | 487 FS, 352 FG |
| December 22, 1943 | 1 | Messerschmitt Me 210 | Zuiderzee, Netherlands | P-47D | 487 FS, 352 FG |
| December 29, 1943 | 1 | Focke-Wulf Fw 190 | Malmedy, Belgium | P-47D | 487 FS, 352 FG |
| April 22, 1944 | 0.33 | Junkers Ju 88 | Stade, Germany | P-51B Mustang | 487 FS, 352 FG |
| May 13, 1944 | 2 | Bf 109 | Neubrandenburg, Germany | P-51B | 487 FS, 352 FG |
| May 30, 1944 | 2.5 | Bf 109 | Magdeburg, Germany | P-51B | 487 FS, 352 FG |
| June 12, 1944 | 1 | Bf 109 | Rennes, France | P-51B | 487 FS, 352 FG |
| June 20, 1944 | 1; 0.5 | Fw 190; Messerschmitt Me 410 | Bernburg, Germany | P-51D Mustang | 487 FS, 352 FG |
| June 21, 1944 | 1 | Bf 109 | Magdeburg, Germany | P-51D | 487 FS, 352 FG |
| July 18, 1944 | 1; 2 | Bf 109; Ju 88 | Rostock, Germany | P-51D | 487 FS, 352 FG |
| July 21, 1944 | 0.5 | Bf 109 | Munich, Germany | P-51D | 487 FS, 352 FG |
| July 29, 1944 | 1 | Bf 109 | Naumburg, Germany | P-51D | 487 FS, 352 FG |
| August 5, 1944 | 1 | Bf 109 | Hamburg, Germany | P-51D | 487 FS, 352 FG |
| August 6, 1944 | 6 | Bf 109 | Hamburg, Germany | P-51D | 487 FS, 352 FG |
| November 2, 1944 | 1 | Bf 109 | Merseburg, Germany | P-51D | 328 FS, 352 FG |
| November 21, 1944 | 1 | Fw 190 | Merseburg, Germany | P-51D | 328 FS, 352 FG |
| December 25, 1944 | 2 | Bf 109 | Koblenz, Germany | P-51D | 328 FS, 352 FG |

SOURCES: Air Force Historical Study 85: USAF Credits for the Destruction of Enemy Aircraft, World War II

== Military decorations ==
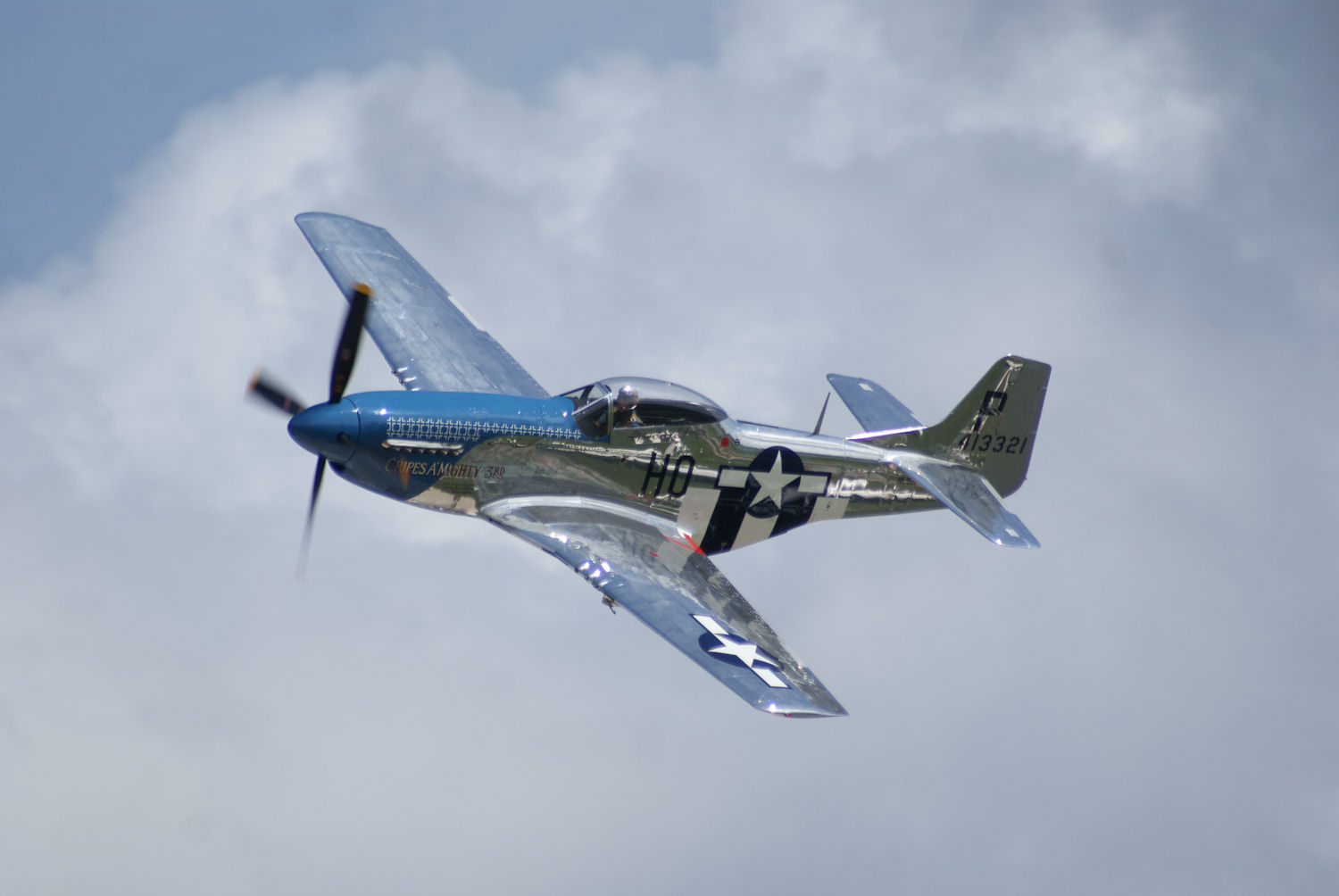
Restored P-51 Mustang Cripes A Mighty 3rd

Preddy's military decorations include:

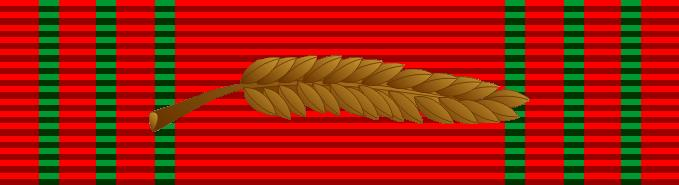
| USAAF Pilot Badge |
| Distinguished Service Cross |
| Silver Star with one bronze oak leaf cluster |
| Distinguished Flying Cross with silver and bronze oak leaf clusters |
| Purple Heart |
| Air Medal with silver and bronze oak leaf clusters |
| American Defense Service Medal |
| American Campaign Medal |
| Asiatic-Pacific Campaign Medal with bronze campaign star |
| European-African-Middle Eastern Campaign Medal with four bronze campaign stars |
| World War II Victory Medal |
| Croix de Guerre with Palm (Belgium) |

Army Presidential Unit Citation

=== Distinguished Service Cross citation ===

Preddy, George E.
Major (Air Corps), U.S. Army Air Forces
487th Fighter Squadron, 352nd Fighter Group, Eighth Air Force
Date of Action: August 6, 1944

Citation:

The President of the United States of America, authorized by Act of Congress July 9, 1918, takes pleasure in presenting the Distinguished Service Cross to Major (Air Corps) George Earl Preddy, United States Army Air Forces, for extraordinary heroism in connection with military operations against an armed enemy while serving as Pilot of a P-51 Fighter Airplane in the 487th Fighter Squadron, 352d Fighter Group, Eighth Air Force, in aerial combat against enemy forces on 6 August 1944, during an air mission in the European Theater of Operations. On this date Major Preddy was leading a fighter group on a bomber escort mission against targets in the vicinity of Hamburg, Germany. As the bomber formation approached its objective, a flight of thirty enemy fighters with top cover support of an additional thirty fighters attempted to intercept the bombers. Major Preddy, with his wingman individually attacked the lower enemy flight, and in spite of its superiority in numbers and the danger of attack from above, pressed home his attack with such aggressiveness that the enemy threat was completely broken up. In the ensuing engagement Major Preddy destroyed six enemy fighters. By his disregard for personal safety and his determined will to destroy the enemy, Major Preddy rendered outstanding and valorous service to our nation.

== Memorials ==
In 1993, Preddy's first cousin Joe Noah founded the Preddy Memorial Foundation to honor both Preddy and his brother.

Veterans of Foreign Wars Post 2087 in Greensboro was named after George Preddy, soon after the end of World War II.

In 1968, Business Interstate 85, through Greensboro, North Carolina was given the street name Preddy Boulevard, in memory of both Preddy brothers.

There is a memorial kiosk with video, photos, and models of planes flown by the Preddy brothers at Piedmont Triad International Airport.
