= I. B. Donalson =

American air force colonel and flying ace (1915–2006)

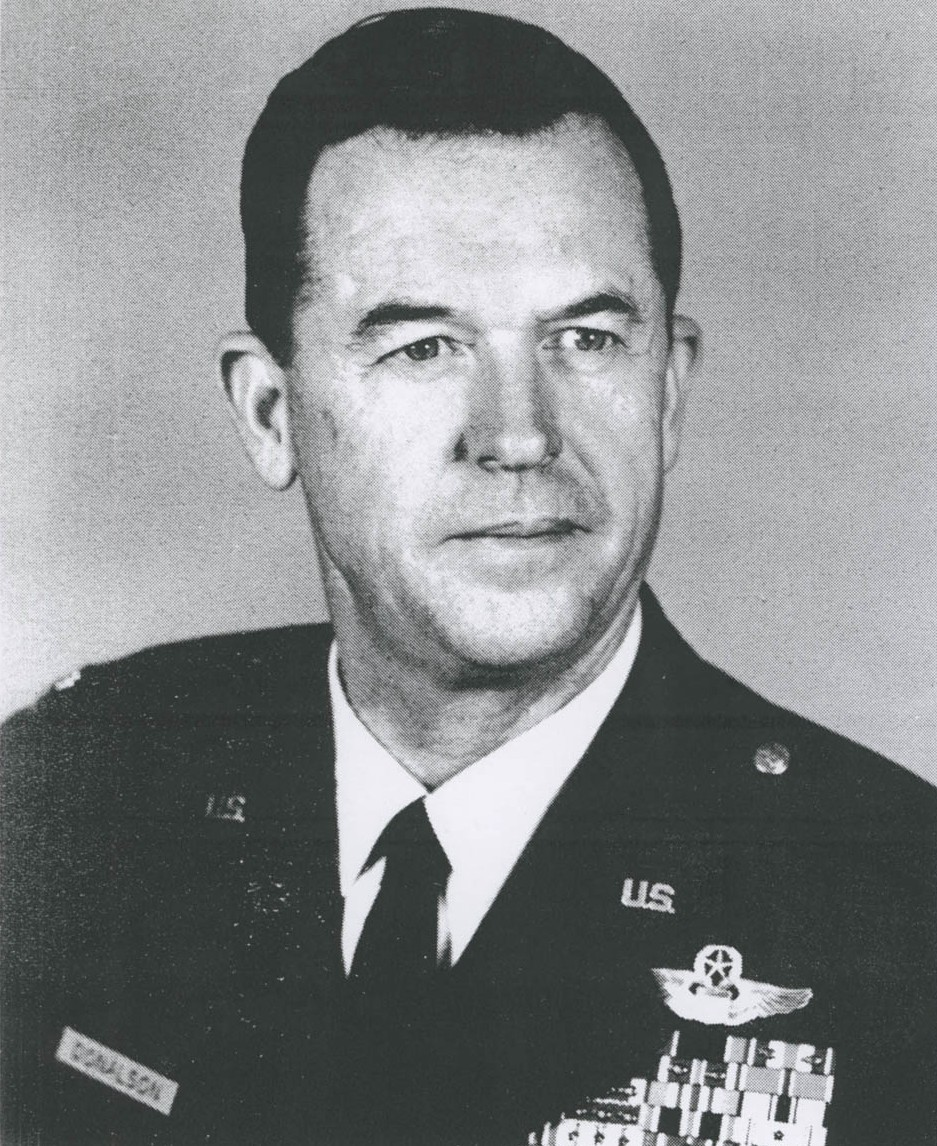
- Donalson in the 1960s
- Born: July 6, 1915; Kyle, Texas, U.S.
- Died: September 24, 2006 (aged 91); San Antonio, Texas, U.S.
- Burial place: Fort Sam Houston National Cemetery
- Military career
- Allegiance: United States
- Branch: United States Army; Army Air Corps; Army Air Forces; United States Air Force
- Service years: 1941–1968
- Rank: Colonel
- Nicknames: IB; Jack
- Units: 24th Pursuit Group; 49th Fighter Group; 352nd Fighter Group; 6250th Support Squadron
- Commands: 328th Fighter Squadron; 26th Fighter Interceptor Squadron; Battle commander, 6250th Support Squadron
- Conflicts: World War II; Vietnam War
- Awards: Distinguished Service Cross; Silver Star (3); Legion of Merit; Distinguished Flying Cross (3); Bronze Star Medal; Air Medal (4)

Israel Bartholomew Donalson Jr. (July 6, 1915 – September 24, 2006) was an American air force colonel. He was a highly decorated United States Air Force pilot and a World War II flying ace. He flew P-40 Warhawks with the 24th Pursuit Group and 49th Fighter Group in the Pacific, and P-51 Mustangs and P-47 Thunderbolts with the 352nd Fighter Group in Europe.

== Early life ==
Donalson was born on July 6, 1915, in Kyle, Texas, and was raised in Tulsa, Oklahoma. He attended schools in Laredo and Beaumont in Texas, and in Florida and Oklahoma. From 1934 to 1937, he worked as a topographic draftsman with the Texas Oil Company. In 1937, he attended the University of Tulsa under an athletic scholarship and majored in geology after three years of studies.

== Military career ==
After taking a Civilian Pilot Training course in 1940, Donalson decided to pursue a career as a military aviator. After being accepted into the Aviation Cadet Program of the United States Army Air Corps, he began flight training in January 1941. He graduated and earned his pilot wings on August 15, 1941, at Kelly Field in Texas. After his graduation from flight training, he was assigned to 21st Pursuit Squadron within the 24th Pursuit Group in Hamilton Field in California.

=== World War II ===
The 21st Pursuit Squadron was ordered to the Philippines and on November 1, 1941, Donalson along with his squadron members departed San Francisco onboard SS President Coolidge en route to Manila. Arriving on November 20, the 21st Pursuit Squadron was assigned to Nichols Field. The unit was initially equipped with Seversky P-35s that had been built for the Swedish Air Force. The squadron received its first P-40E Warhawks on December 4. On December 8, Donalson's squadron commander, William E. Dyess, received the news about the Japanese attack on Pearl Harbor that morning. The 21st Pursuit Squadron was ordered to remain on alert status but not take to the air. On the same day, Japan commenced the invasion of the Philippines, and aircraft of the Imperial Japanese Army Air Service commenced bombing Baguio, 150 miles north of Manila.

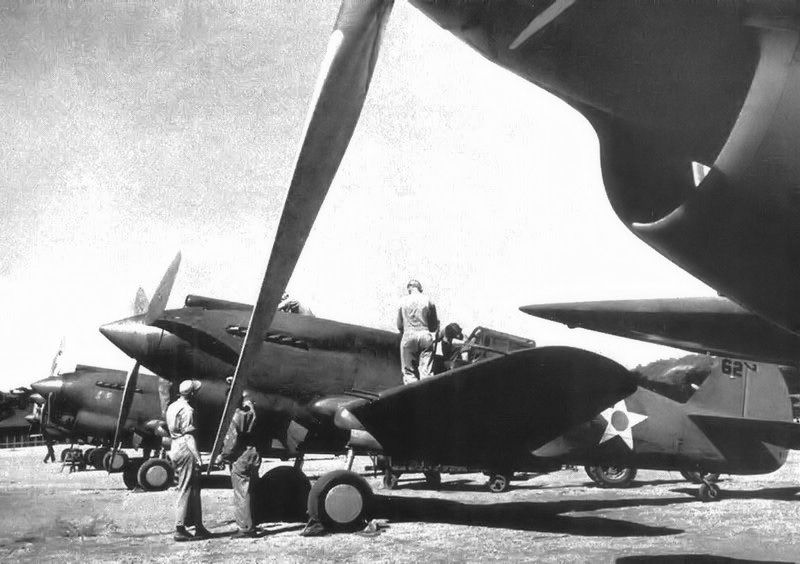
24th Pursuit Group P-40s at Nichols Field (1941)

Donalson and the 21st Pursuit Squadron were scrambled and assigned to combat air patrol over Manila Bay. During the patrol, Japanese fighter planes and bombers from Taiwan attacked Clark Field. Upon landing at Nichols Field, Donalson's squadron was ordered to Clark Field. Departing from Clark Field on an air patrol, Donalson's flight encountered thirty Japanese bombers and fighters attacking Clark Field. He shot down two Japanese Mitsubishi A6M Zeros, his first aerial victories. He refueled and departed the following day to Nichols Field. Approaching Nichols Field, he encountered a Zero pulling up from a strafing run and quickly shot it down, his third aerial victory. During the Battle of Bataan, from January 1942 members of the 24th Pursuit Group were assigned to infantry units. In February, Donalson volunteered for a dangerous mission as an infantryman to eliminate a group of about 75 Japanese soldiers who were dug in along the west coast of Bataan. When ground attacks failed, he led one of two small boats, consisting of 10 men altogether, in an assault from the sea. Despite heavy enemy fire and bombing by nine enemy dive bombers, Donalson helped neutralize the Japanese position. For his bravery, he was awarded the Distinguished Service Cross—second only to the Medal of Honor.

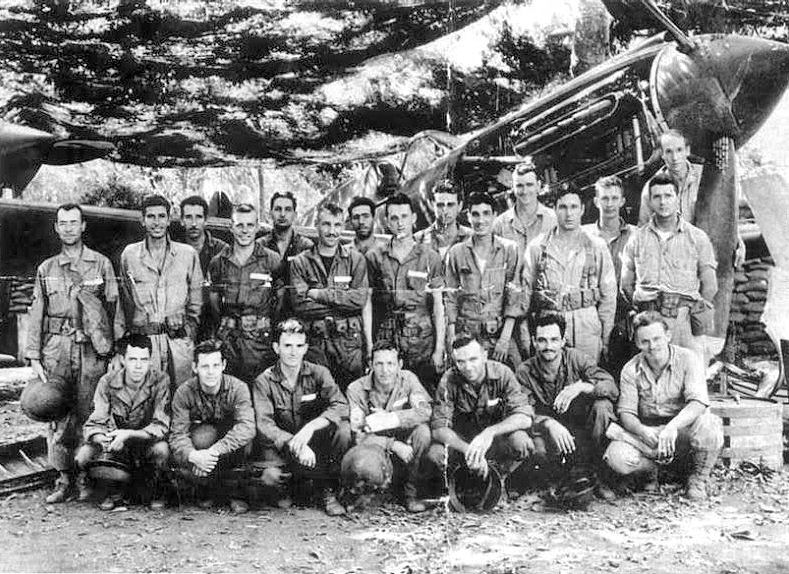
Members of the 24th Pursuit Group with P-40E at Bataan (1942)

When the Bataan Peninsula fell to the Japanese, Donalson was given the P-40 belonging to his squadron commander William Dyess for a last bombing run on April 9, after which Donalson was ordered to fly to Cebu, where he crash-landed. Donalson boarded a B-17 Flying Fortress and evacuated to Australia. Following his evacuation to Australia, he was assigned as P-40 pilot with the 9th Fighter Squadron of the 49th Fighter Group. The 49th Fighter Group, at that time, was tasked in defending the city of Darwin from Japanese air raids. On June 14, 1942, he downed a fourth Zero over Darwin and on July 30, 1942, he downed a fifth, also over Darwin, hence earning the title of flying ace.

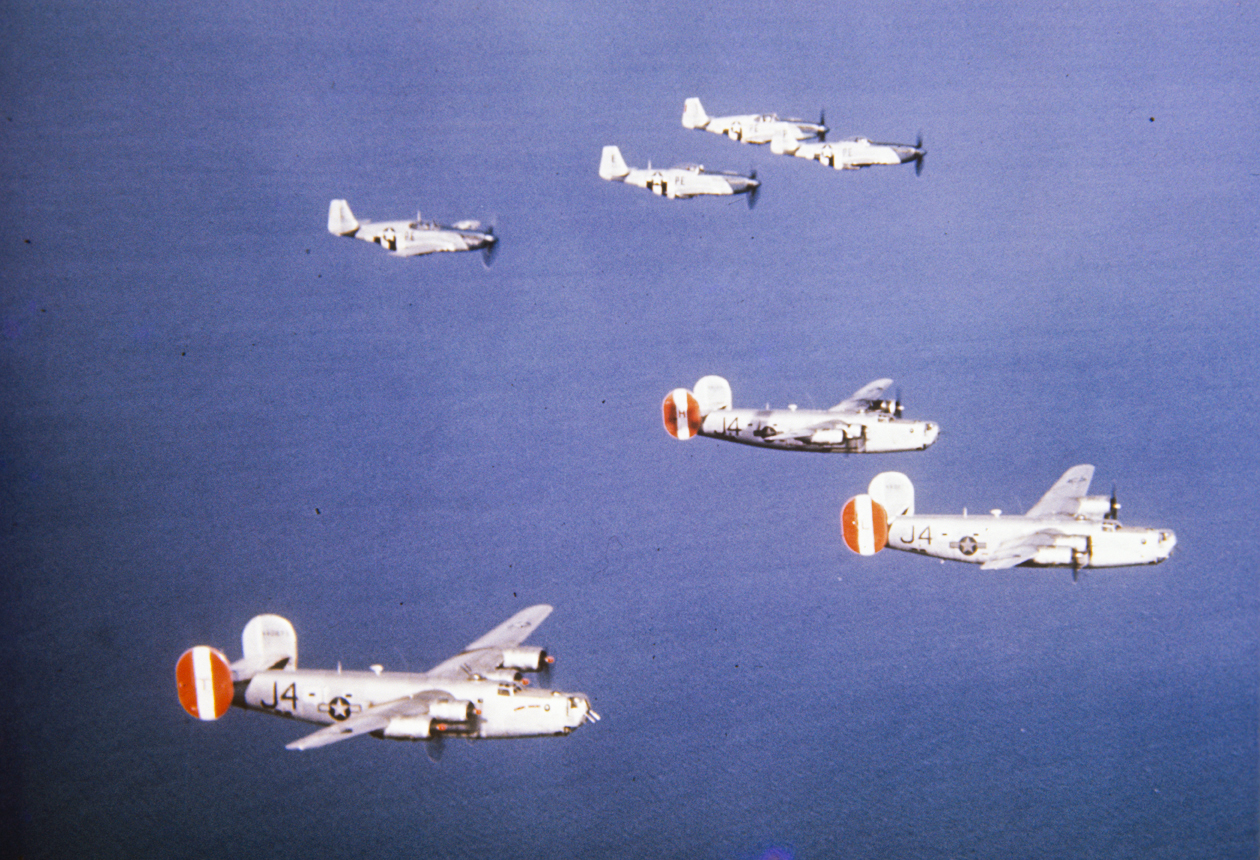
P-51s of the 352nd FG escorting B-24s (1944)

In October 1942, Donalson returned to the United States and following the completion of training in the P-47 Thunderbolt, he was assigned to the 487th Fighter Squadron of the 352nd Fighter Group. During this time, he was also instrumental in recommending George E. Preddy, with whom he had served with the 49th Fighter Group in Australia and was injured in a combat training accident in Darwin on July 12, 1942, which was witnessed by Donalson, to be assigned to the 352nd Fighter Group. In June 1943, the group landed in the United Kingdom, and was assigned to RAF Bodney in Watton, Norfolk, under the operational control of the 67th Fighter Wing, VIII Fighter Command. During combat operations in Europe, he served as commander of the 328th Fighter Squadron within the 352nd Fighter Group, and flew P-47s and later the P-51 Mustang and described his time with 352nd Fighter Group as "a walk in the park compared to Bataan and Darwin". He returned to the United States in May 1944 and served as flight instructor during the remainder of World War II. He flew a total of 121 combat missions during the war.

=== Post war ===
Following the end of World War II and following the establishment of the United States Air Force in 1947, Donalson was assigned to Tactical Air Command where he served as aide-de-camp to General Elwood Quesada. He was then assigned to West Germany where he supported post-war operations with the 86th Fighter Wing and 12th Air Force. In the 1950s, he led operational efforts across several U.S. bases, including roles in New Mexico, Arizona, and Washington. He then attended the Air Command and Staff College at Maxwell Air Force Base in Alabama from 1955 to 1956. He then commanded the 26th Fighter Interceptor Squadron, which was equipped with the North American F-86D Sabre, at Clark Air Base in the Philippines from 1956 to 1958 and later served as an advisor to the Pennsylvania Air National Guard. He went on to hold inspection and operations roles with the Air Defense Command and NORAD during the Cold War.

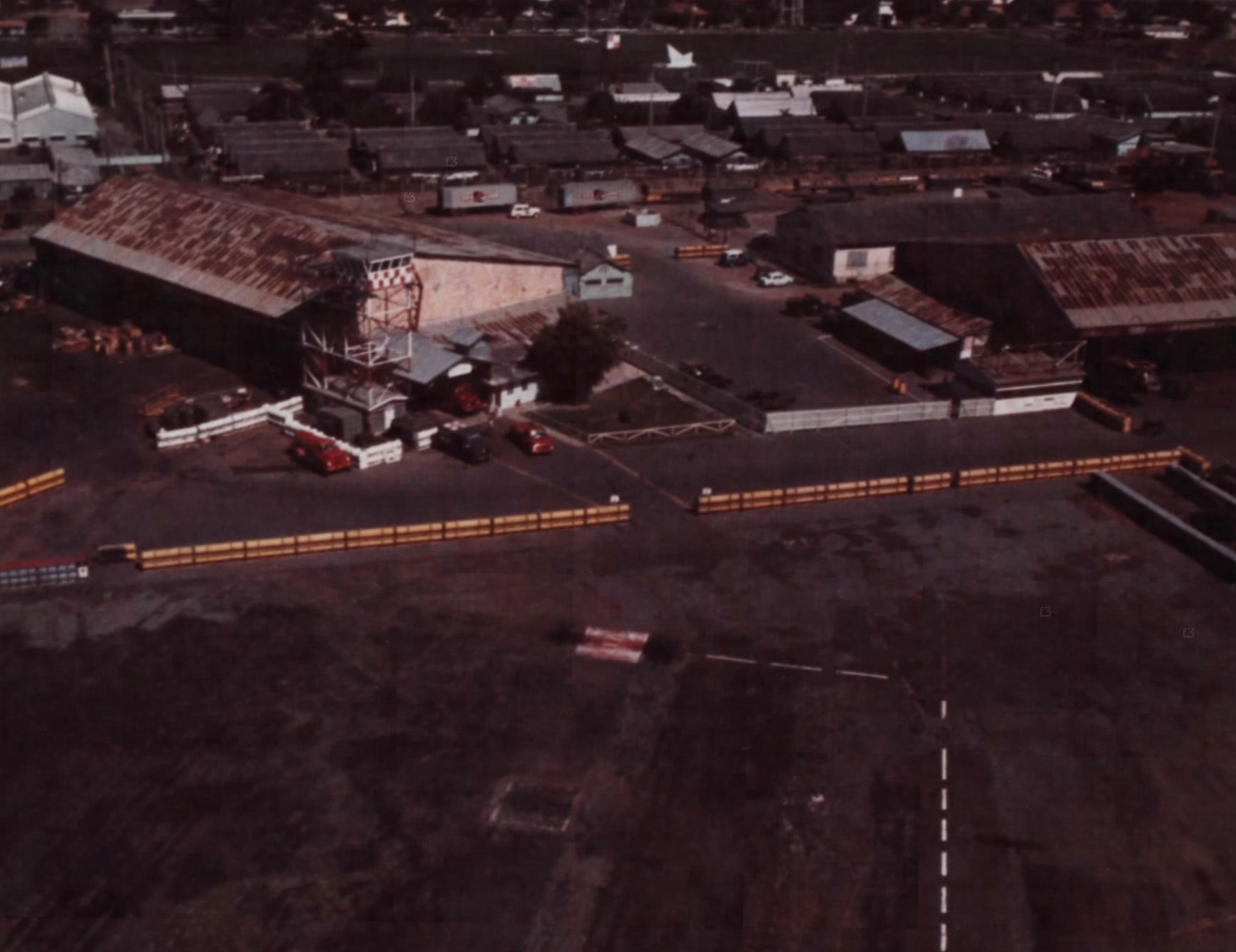
Tan Son Nhut Air Base during Vietnam War

During the Vietnam War, he was stationed at Tan Son Nhut Air Base in South Vietnam, where he served as Battle Commander and Director of Operations and Training with the 6250th Support Squadron from May 1966 to May 1967. Assigned as commander of the Tiger Hound Task Force, the task force consisted of Marine, Air Force and Army aircraft which performed visual reconnaissance and called in air strikes against enemy targets during the war. After his return from Vietnam, he was assigned to Ent Air Force Base in Colorado where he retired from active duty in 1968.

== Later life ==
Donalson was married to Mauree Horne on August 16, 1941. The couple had three sons. After his retirement from the Air Force, Donalson served as the vice president of Public Service Company in Oklahoma until 1980. Following his complete retirement, he moved to San Antonio. He died on September 24, 2006, at the age of 91 due to complications from pneumonia and was buried with full military honors at Fort Sam Houston National Cemetery.

== Aerial victory credits ==
Date	#	Type	Location	Aircraft flown	Unit Assigned
December 8, 1941	2	Mitsubishi A6M Zero	Luzon, Philippines	P-40E Warhawk	21 PS, 24 PG
December 9, 1941	1	A6M Zero	Manila, Philippines	P-40E	21 PS, 24 PG
June 14, 1942	1	A6M Zero	Darwin, Australia	P-40E	9 FS, 49 FG
July 30, 1942	1	A6M Zero	Darwin, Australia	P-40E	9 FS, 49 FG

== Awards and decorations ==

USAF Command Pilot Badge
Distinguished Service Cross	Silver Star with two bronze oak leaf clusters	Legion of Merit
Distinguished Flying Cross with two bronze oak leaf clusters	Bronze Star Medal	Air Medal with three bronze oak leaf clusters
Joint Service Commendation Medal	Air Force Commendation Medal	Air Force Presidential Unit Citation with three bronze oak leaf clusters
Air Force Outstanding Unit Award	American Defense Service Medal with service star	American Campaign Medal
Asiatic-Pacific Campaign Medal with three bronze campaign stars	European–African–Middle Eastern Campaign Medal with bronze campaign star	World War II Victory Medal
Army of Occupation Medal with 'Germany' clasp	National Defense Service Medal with service star	Vietnam Service Medal with bronze campaign star
Air Force Longevity Service Award with silver oak leaf cluster	Small Arms Expert Marksmanship Ribbon	Philippine Defense Medal
Philippine Independence Medal	Republic of Vietnam Gallantry Cross Unit Citation	Vietnam Campaign Medal

=== Distinguished Service Cross ===

Donalson, I.B.
First Lieutenant (then Second Lieutenant), U.S Army Air Corps
21st Pursuit Squadron, 5th Interceptor Command, Far East Air Forces
Date of Action: February 1942
Headquarters, South West Pacific Area, General Orders No. 19 (August 7, 1942)

Citation:

The President of the United States of America, authorized by Act of Congress, July 9, 1918, takes pleasure in presenting the Distinguished Service Cross to First Lieutenant (Air Corps), (then Second Lieutenant) I. B. Jack Donalson, United States Army Air Forces, for extraordinary heroism in connection with military operations against an armed enemy while serving as Pilot of a P-40 Fighter Airplane in the 21st Pursuit Squadron, 5th Interceptor Command, Far East Air Force, in aerial combat against enemy forces on Bataan Peninsula, Philippine Islands, in February 1942. When the remnants of an enemy landing party, numbering approximately seventy-five men, firmly entrenched along the shore under a cliff on the western coast of Bataan, were able to repulse with heavy losses all overland attempts to dislodge them, volunteers were called for to undertake an attack from the sea in two small boats. Lieutenant Donalson volunteered, commanded one of the boats, and in spite of heavy fire from the defenders and bombing, during the course of the attack, by nine enemy dive-bombers, succeeded in neutralizing the enemy position, thereby preventing further losses to our forces. First Lieutenant Donalson's unquestionable valor in aerial combat is in keeping with the highest traditions of the military service and reflects great credit upon himself, the Far East Air Force, and the United States Army Air Forces.

== Bibliography ==
- Dyess, William E. (1944). The Dyess Story (Hardcover). Putnam. ASIN B00DJU3FFA.
- Hammel, Eric (2009). Aces Against Japan II: The American Aces Speak: Volume III (Hardcover). Pacifica Military History. ASIN B002DWA44U.
