= Ray C. Hunt =

American soldier (1919–1996)

- Born: December 11, 1919; St. Louis, Missouri
- Died: June 17, 1996
- Burial place: Jefferson Barracks National Cemetery
- Military career
- Allegiance: United States
- Branch: United States Army Air Forces
- Rank: Lt. Colonel
- Unit: 21st Pursuit Squadron
- Conflicts: World War II • Battle of Bataan • Battle of Luzon
- Awards: Distinguished Service Cross; Bronze Star

Ray C. Hunt (December 11, 1919 – June 17, 1996) was a staff sergeant in the United States Army Air Forces stationed at Nichols Field in the Philippines at the beginning of World War II, under the command of Ed Dyess. After the surrender at Bataan, where he fought as an infantryman, he was forced to take the Bataan Death March with many other American and Filipinos. During the March, he escaped and fled into the hills. He eventually became a noted guerrilla leader on Luzon, where he served for three years behind Japanese lines. Hunt was promoted to captain by guerrilla leaders during that time.

== Philippines ==
Joining the 21st Pursuit Squadron at Hamilton Field, San Francisco, Dyess led the squadron to Nichols Field, Manila, Philippines, in November 1941. The war began for Hunt midday on 8 Dec. 1941, when the Japanese strafed Nichols Field. Finally retreating to Bataan, his unit fought in the Battle of Bataan, before surrendering and starting the Bataan Death March after the surrender on 9 April 1942. Hunt states, "I don't remember how many of those days I actually spent marching down the road accompanied by Japanese guards: seven or eight most likely, possibly ten", before he escaped on 21 April.

Starved from his normal weight of 150–160 pounds down to 100, and suffering from malaria, beriberi and jaundice, Hunt spent the next five months recovering in the Fassoth Camps. These camps in the Zambales Mountains, were organized by the rice and sugar planter American William Fassoth, with his Filipina wife Catalina, and son Vernon, along with the Spanish-mestizo sugar planters Vincente and Arturo Bernia. Hunt escaped capture when the Japanese raided the camp on 26 Sept. 1942. Over a hundred Americans spent some time in the Fassoth Camps, before William Fassoth surrendered in spring of 1943, spending the remainder of the war in the Cabanatuan Prison Camp. Following his second escape, Hunt was cared for by the Franco Filipino family in Tibuc-Tibuc, western Pampanga, before he headed north with an Igorot, Jose Balekow, his future bodyguard.

Hunt recruited a small guerrilla force at San Jose, near Tarlac City, and then linked up with Robert Lapham's forces, becoming Capt. Albert C. Hendrickson's executive officer. The Japanese put bounties on both their heads: $50,000 for Hendrickson and $10,000 for Hunt. Thorp's former girlfriend, Herminia (Minang) Dizon, then became Hunt's after Thorp's capture. In the spring of 1944, Gregorio S. Agaton became Hunt's bodyguard, just before Hunt took command of Pangasinan that summer. He named Tom Chengay captain of his northern district, Antonio Garcia in the west, Emilio Hernandez in the central, Antonio Hernandez in the east, Severino M. Obana as second in command, Jimmy Galura as supply officer, and Juan Utleg as chief of intelligence. Hunt received a radio for communicating with Australia in July 1944, and regular supplies from submarines.

On 4 January 1945, Hunt received orders to implement Operations Plan 12, which called for five days of attacks in preparation for the Luzon invasion, including an attack on the San Quentin Japanese garrison. Just during the five days before the American landings on Luzon, the guerrilla battalion under Hunt's command was credited with killing over 3,000 Japanese soldiers in numerous ambushes and raids. On 10 January, he made contact with General Walter Krueger, and on 22 January, received orders to proceed to 25th Division headquarters in Manoag, to meet Lapham for the first time.

== Afterwards ==
Hunt continued to serve with the regular U.S. Army after its return to the Philippines, assisting the U.S. Army's 32nd Division, in fighting the Japanese, while also coordinating guerrilla activities, at the Battle of Villa Verde Trail.

Personally awarded the U.S. Distinguished Service Cross by General Douglas MacArthur on 13 June 1945, Hunt also received the Bronze Star for staying with his troops when he could have returned to the US. The Army then made official his rank of captain, retroactive to 11 December 1943.

He left the Philippines on 20 June 1945 to return to the United States. At that time, he was only 25 years old. He became a USAF fighter pilot, retiring as a lieutenant colonel.

== See also ==
- List of American guerrillas in the Philippines
- Samuel Grashio
