= Pugoy – Hostage: Davao =

1993 Philippine action film

- Directed by: Francis "Jun" Posadas
- Written by: Francis Posadas; Jojo Lapus; Ely Perez
- Produced by: Eddie Chua
- Starring: Ian Veneracion
- Cinematography: Ver Dauz
- Edited by: Rogelio Salvador
- Production company: First Films
- Distributed by: First Films
- Release date: March 10, 1993
- Languages: Filipino; Cebuano; English

Pugoy – Hostage: Davao is a 1993 Filipino action film directed by Francis "Jun" Posadas. The film stars Ian Veneracion as Felipe Pugoy. The film is based on the 1989 Davao hostage crisis. Produced by First Films, the film was released in early 1993.

== Plot ==
This film is about the story of Felipe Pugoy, a troubled inmate who, with his gang, instigated a hostage crisis in a Davao City prison that led to 21 deaths (5 hostages and 16 inmates, including Pugoy) in 1989. Among them were a visiting Australian female missionary Jacqueline Hamill with the evangelical Joyful Assembly of God.

== Cast ==
- Ian Veneracion as Felipe Pugoy
- Lito Legaspi as Mayor Antonio Duwalde (based on Mayor Rodrigo Duterte)
- Roy Alvarez as Lt. Col. Franco Calida
- Gina Pangle as Jacqueline Raye Hamill
- Mark Gil as Mohammad Nazir Samparani
