= Jack Hawkins (U.S. Marine Corps officer) =

United States Marine Corps officer and writer (1916–2013)

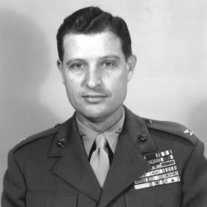
- Born: October 25, 1916; Roxton, Texas, U.S.
- Died: May 17, 2013 (aged 96); Fredericksburg, Virginia, U.S.
- Burial place: Quantico National Cemetery, Quantico, Virginia
- Military career
- Allegiance: United States of America
- Branch: United States Marine Corps
- Service years: 1939–1965
- Rank: Colonel
- Nickname: Colonel Frank
- Commands: 1st Battalion, 2nd Marines; 1st Battalion, 1st Marines
- Conflicts: World War II; Philippines campaign (1941–1942); Battle of Bataan; Battle of Corregidor; Philippine resistance against Japan; Battle of Okinawa; Korean War; Battle of Inchon; Battle of Chosin Reservoir; Cold War; Bay of Pigs Invasion
- Awards: Distinguished Service Cross; Silver Star; Bronze Star with «V» Joint Service Commendation Medal; Navy Commendation Medal with «V»

Jack L. Hawkins (October 25, 1916 – May 17, 2013) was a United States Marines Corps colonel employed by the CIA for the military planning, training of Cuban exiles, and the effective military command of forces in the Bay of Pigs Invasion of Cuba in April 1961. Hawkins was known by the alias John Haskins.

== Biography ==
Jack Hawkins graduated as a second lieutenant from the United States Naval Academy. In 1939, he attended the Marine Corps Basic School for officers, and then served with the Fourth Marines in Shanghai and in the Philippines when the regiment was transferred there in late 1941.

=== World War II ===
During World War II, he saw service in the Philippines at the Battle of Bataan and was taken prisoner by Japanese armed forces after the Battle of Corregidor. Initially sent to a prison camp on Luzon, he was later transferred to another prison camp on Mindanao where conditions were somewhat better. The new prison camp was actually a pre-war convict facility on a plantation. Eventually, he and two other POWs, one of whom was William Dyess, planned an escape. However, the need for additional expertise in their post-escape plans brought the total number of Americans in the group to ten, including Samuel Grashio and Austin Shofner. Then they enlisted the help of two Filipinos who had been imprisoned before the war as convicts to serve as guides. The escape was successful and the two Filipinos eventually received pardons for their assistance.

The group moved through dangerous swamps for several days and eventually stumbled upon a guerrilla unit. This unit passed the Americans on to other bands until the escapees eventually were led to Colonel Wendell Fertig, who commanded the American-Filipino guerrillas on Mindanao. Hawkins served with the guerrillas for seven months. He led raiding parties in attacks against Japanese forces, before traveling to Australia via submarine in November 1943. Hawkins received the Distinguished Service Cross for his actions in the Philippines during the period 4 April - 15 November 1943. In 1961, Hawkins authored a book, Never Say Die, on his POW and guerrilla experiences.

In 1945, Hawkins was involved in the planning of the U.S. invasion of Japanese-held territory in the Battle of Okinawa. Author Don Bohning states that Hawkins was not involved in planning for the Battle of Iwo Jima.

=== Post war ===
Following World War II, he served as a member of the Naval Mission to Venezuela for three years as adviser to the Venezuelan Marine Corps, before returning to Camp Lejeune, North Carolina. In September 1950, as Commanding Officer, 1st Battalion, 1st Marines, he led his battalion ashore at the Battle of Inchon, Korea, and later participated in the Chosin Reservoir campaign. He was awarded the Silver Star for his actions there. In 1955 he was promoted to full colonel, becoming commander of the Amphibious Forces at Little Creek, Virginia. He served for three years as an instructor on amphibious landings in Marine Corps schools at Quantico.

== Bay of Pigs Invasion ==
On the recommendation of Marine Corps Commandant General David M. Shoup, Colonel Hawkins was recruited by the CIA which wanted a Marine officer with background in amphibious warfare to help with a project to land some exile troops in Cuba. He was assigned to the Cuba task force on Sept 1, 1960, when CIA Deputy Director of Plans Richard M. Bissell Jr. began to expand the planned operation from a guerrilla infiltration to an amphibious assault. At the CIA, Hawkins was appointed Chief of Paramilitary Operations Western Hemisphere Division Branch 4 (WH/4/PM), reporting to Jacob Esterline, Chief of Western Hemisphere Branch 4 (WH/4). He was already fluent in Spanish, and under his command were Grayston Lynch and William "Rip" Robertson as the CIA representatives in the amphibious landings. ( Col. Stanley W. Beerli, the chief of air operations, reported to Richard Bissell ). From his base in Miami, he instructed the combatants via radio links relayed via US Navy ships, aiming to defeat Cuban government forces in the conflict. He retired from the Marines in 1965.

== See also ==
- List of American guerrillas in the Philippines
- E. Howard Hunt
- Jacob Esterline
- Richard M. Bissell Jr.
- Zapata Corporation
- Escape From Davao: The Forgotten Story of the Most Daring Prison Break of the Pacific War
