= William E. Dyess =

United States Army Air Forces officer

William Edwin Dyess
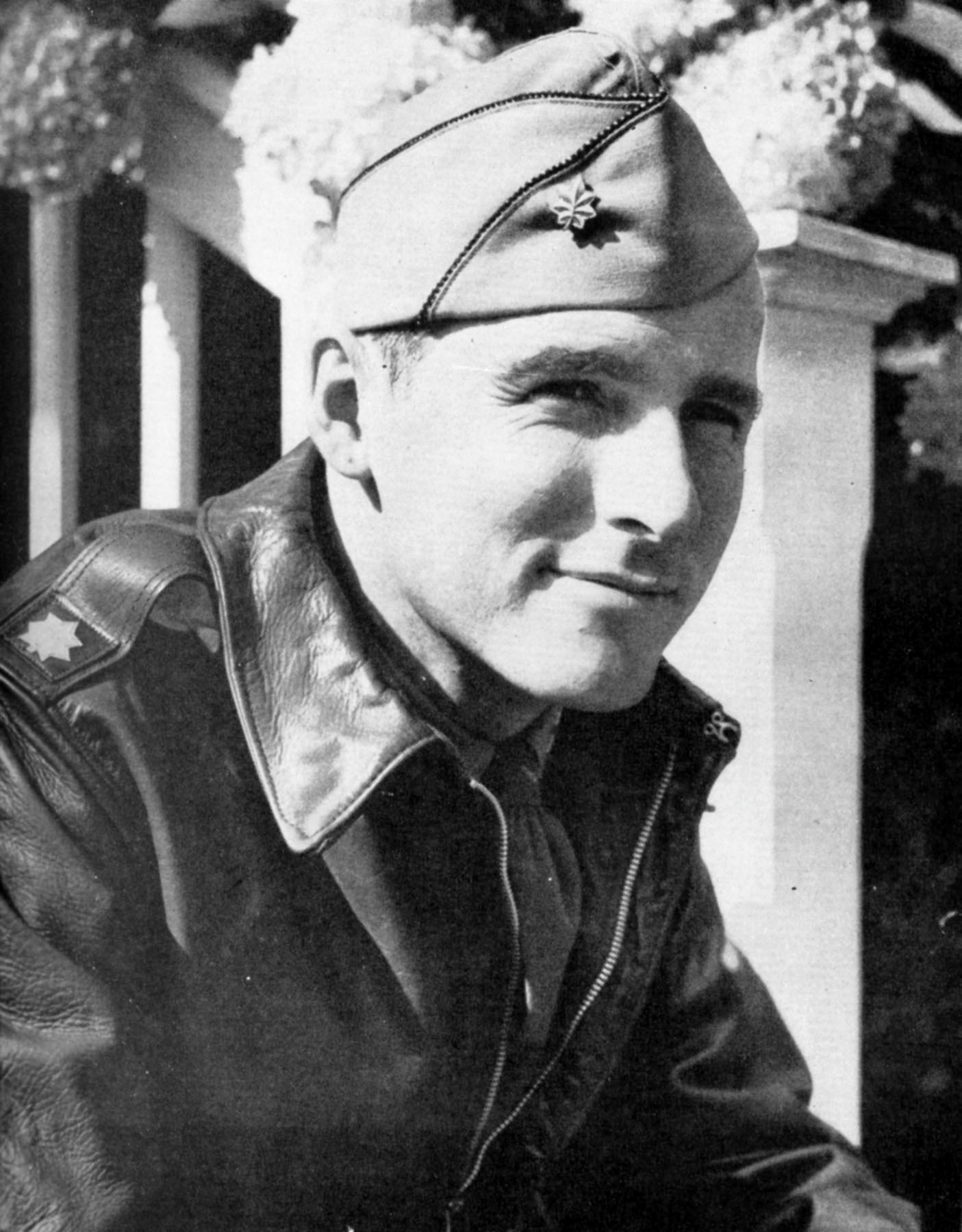
- 1943
- Born: August 9, 1916; Albany, Texas, US
- Died: December 22, 1943 (aged 27); Burbank, California, US
- Burial place: Albany Cemetery; Albany, Texas
- Military career
- Allegiance: United States
- Branch: U.S. Army Air Corps; U.S. Army Air Forces
- Service years: 1937–1943
- Rank: Lieutenant Colonel
- Nickname: Ed
- Units: 24th Pursuit Group; 329th Fighter Group
- Commands: 21st Pursuit Squadron
- Conflicts: World War II • Battle of Bataan
- Awards: Distinguished Service Cross (2); Silver Star (2); Legion of Merit; Distinguished Flying Cross (2); Soldier's Medal; Bronze Star Medal; Purple Heart; Texas Legislative Medal of Honor

William Edwin Dyess (August 9, 1916 – December 22, 1943) was an officer of the United States Army Air Forces during World War II. He was captured after the Allied loss at the Battle of Bataan and endured the subsequent Bataan Death March. After a year in captivity, Dyess escaped and spent three months on the run before being evacuated from the Philippines by a U.S. submarine. Once back in the U.S., he recounted the story of his capture and imprisonment, providing the first widely published eye-witness account of the brutality of the death march. He returned to duty in the Army Air Forces, but was killed in a training accident months later. Dyess Air Force Base, assigned to Air Force Global Strike Command, located in Abilene Texas, is named in his honor.

== Biography ==
Born and raised in Albany, Texas, Dyess was the son of Judge Richard T. and Hallie Graham Dyess. He played football and ran track and field at Albany High School, and graduated in 1934. He attended John Tarleton Agricultural College in Stephenville, Texas, and graduated on May 18, 1936. He was a distant cousin of fellow World War II veteran Aquilla J. Dyess.

Dyess underwent flight training at Kelly and Randolph Fields in San Antonio and was commissioned as a second lieutenant in the United States Army Air Corps in 1937. Promoted to first lieutenant and command of the 21st Pursuit Squadron at Hamilton Field, San Francisco, Dyess led the squadron to Nichols Field, Manila, Philippines, in November 1941.

== Bataan ==
The 21st Pursuit Squadron was assigned to the 24th Pursuit Group which together with the 19th Bomb Group suffered heavy casualties during the opening of the war with Japan in 1941. Flying P-40 Warhawks against Japanese types, Dyess maintained his unit's morale in the face of staggering losses during the Battle of Bataan. When his squadron ran short of aircraft, Dyess became an infantry officer, serving in this capacity during the Battle of the Points.

When the Bataan Peninsula fell to the Japanese, Dyess, as commanding officer, refused to abandon those of his squadron who could not be evacuated. He gave his airplane ("Kibosh") to another fighter pilot, Lieutenant I.B. "Jack" Donalson, for last bombing run on April 9, after which Donalson was ordered to fly it to Cebu, where he crash landed. Dyess also supervised the evacuation of Philippine Army Colonel Carlos Romulo, a close friend of General Douglas MacArthur, who would survive the war and would later serve as President of the United Nations General Assembly.

Dyess was captured by the Japanese on April 9, 1942, north of Mariveles, Bataan, and the next morning, he and the others who surrendered at Bataan began the infamous Bataan Death March. He was imprisoned at Camp O'Donnell and then, from June to October 26, 1942, at Cabanatuan. There, his men and he were routinely denied the rights of prisoners of war.

Dyess and others were transported by ship, the Erie Maru, to the Davao Penal Colony on Mindanao, arriving November 7. After two months of planning and preparation, Dyess, along with 9 other American POWs, including Major Jack Hawkins, Austin Shofner, and Samuel Grashio, and two Filipino convicts escaped from Davao on April 4, 1943. It was the only large-scale escape of Allied POWs from the Japanese in the Pacific Theater during World War II. Dyess and his group spent several weeks evading pursuit, then joined a group of guerrillas for several months. The group decided to split up, with seven joining organized guerrilla forces in northern Mindanao. Dyess and two others were evacuated by the U.S. Navy submarine Trout to Australia in July 1943.

Upon reaching the United States in August, he was thoroughly debriefed on his experiences as a POW by high-ranking military brass. He was ordered to recuperate, in September 1943, at the Ashford General Hospital in White Sulphur Springs, West Virginia. From his hospital bed, Dyess worked with Chicago Tribune writer Charles Leavelle to tell the story of the atrocities and brutality his fellow POWs and he had experienced and witnessed while in Japanese captivity. The U.S. government, however, refused to release Dyess' story for publication on the grounds that it would infuriate the Japanese and risk the death of remaining American prisoners. The Tribune had to wait another four and a half months for the Secretary of War to grant release of the story.

== Death and legacy ==
Promoted to lieutenant colonel, Dyess was assigned to fly P-38 Lightnings in preparation for a return to combat. On December 22, 1943, his aircraft, P-38G-10-LO Lightning, 42-13441, of the 337th Fighter Squadron, 329d Fighter Group, lost an engine caused by a fire on take-off from Grand Central Airport. Dyess had a chance to bail out of his troubled aircraft, but was flying over a heavily populated area and did not want to be responsible for any civilian casualties. He remained in his stricken P-38, attempting to land it in a vacant lot, and died when the aircraft crashed.

He is buried in Albany Cemetery in Albany, Texas.

Almost one month after his death, the Chicago Tribune finally received permission from government censorship offices to release the deceased aviator's story on January 28, 1944. The story ran in serial form for several weeks and was picked up by over 100 American newspapers. According to Leavelle, it was the biggest story of the war since Pearl Harbor. Published in book form in 1944, The Dyess Story (later retitled Bataan Death March) became a bestseller.

Among other commendations, Dyess received the Distinguished Flying Cross twice and Distinguished Service Cross also twice. In 1957, Abilene Army Airfield was renamed Dyess Air Force Base in his honor and in 2006, a replica of Dyess' beloved P-40 Warhawk, named "Kibosh", was installed at the front gate of the base in his memory. His personal papers are archived at Maxwell Air Force Base in Alabama and the special collections archive at Texas Tech University in Lubbock, Texas.

In 2024, Lt. Col Dyess was chosen as the exemplar for United States Air Force Academy Class of 2027.

== Military decorations ==
His awards and decorations include:

USAAF pilot badge
Distinguished Service Cross with bronze oak leaf cluster		Silver Star with bronze oak leaf cluster
Legion of Merit	Distinguished Flying Cross with bronze oak leaf cluster	Soldier's Medal
Bronze Star Medal	Purple Heart	Prisoner of War Medal
American Defense Service Medal with bronze service star	American Campaign Medal	Asiatic-Pacific Campaign Medal with bronze campaign star
World War II Victory Medal	Philippine Defense Medal	Texas Legislative Medal of Honor

Army Presidential Unit Citation	Philippine Republic Presidential Unit Citation

=== Distinguished Service Cross citation (1st Award) ===

Dyess., William E.
Captain (Air Corps), U.S. Army Air Forces
21st Pursuit Squadron, 24th Pursuit Group, Far East Air Force
Date of Action: March 2, 1942

Citation:

The President of the United States of America is authorized by the Act of Congress of July 9, 1918, proudly presents the Distinguished Service Cross to Captain (Air Corps) William Edwin Dyess, United States Army Air Forces, for his extraordinary bravery during military operations against the enemy.

While serving as a pilot of a P-40 Fighter Aircraft with the 21st Pursuit Squadron, 24th Pursuit Group, Far East Air Force, Captain Dyess took part in a bombing mission against Japanese ships at Subic Bay, Philippine Islands, on March 2, 1942.

On that day, Captain Dyess showed great courage and skill by attaching a 500-pound bomb to his aircraft using a temporary release system. Along with three other pilots, he attacked Japanese ships in Subic Bay by bombing and strafing enemy positions. Despite facing heavy enemy fire, he made three dangerous attack runs and successfully destroyed or damaged several small ships, warehouses, and supply areas.

=== Distinguished Service Cross citation (2nd Award) ===

Dyess., William E.
Major (Air Corps), U.S. Army Air Forces
Philippine Guerilla Forces
Date of Action: April 4, 1943 – July 20, 1943

Citation:

The President of the United States of America, authorized by Act of Congress July 9, 1918, takes pleasure in presenting a Bronze Oak Leaf Cluster in lieu of a Second Award of the Distinguished Service Cross to Major (Air Corps) William Edwin Dyess, United States Army Air Forces, for extraordinary heroism in connection with military operations against an armed enemy while serving with Philippine Guerilla Forces during the period April 4, 1943, through July 20, 1943. Major Dyess was one of ten men including two Naval Officers, three Air Corps Officers, and two Marine Corps Officers who escaped after nearly a year in captivity after the fall of Bataan and Corregidor. The ten men evaded their captors for days until connecting with Filipino Guerillas under Wendell Fertig. The officers remained with the guerillas for weeks, obtaining vital information which they carried with them when they were subsequently evacuated by American submarines. Their escape was the only mass escape from a Japanese prison camp during the war. The personal courage and zealous devotion to duty displayed by Major Dyess during this period have upheld the highest traditions of the military service and reflect great credit upon himself, the Prisoner of War, and the United States Army Air Forces.

== See also ==
- Escape From Davao: The Forgotten Story of the Most Daring Prison Break of the Pacific War
- List of American guerrillas in the Philippines
- Ray C. Hunt
- Iliff David Richardson
