= Escape from Davao =

2010 book by John D. Lukacs

Escape From Davao
- Author: John D. Lukacs
- Genre: Non-fiction
- Publisher: Penguin Books
- Publication date: 2010
- Pages: 448
- ISBN: 978-0743262781
- OCLC: 464593097

Escape From Davao: The Forgotten Story of the Most Daring Prison Break of the Pacific War, is a non-fiction, military history book written by John D. Lukacs. The book is the story of the only large-scale group of American prisoners of war to escape from a Japanese prison camp in the Pacific Theater during World War II. The ten escaped POWs were the first to break the news of the infamous Bataan Death March and other atrocities committed by the Japanese to the world.

The ten POWs, after two months of planning and preparation, escaped from Davao Penal Colony on Mindanao in the Philippines on April 4, 1943, and were led by Lt. William Dyess and assisted by two Filipino convicts. The American prisoners spent a year in captivity, and after escape spent several months on the run. The group underwent unspeakable conditions, and once rescued were able to convey the realities of Japanese POW camps to the U.S. government, eventually prompting increased U.S. military action in the Pacific.

Lukacs constructed the book's narrative – including the grim details of the three-week-long Bataan Death March, the grisly treatment of the prisoners of war by the Japanese, and the difficult escape itself – through interviews with surviving characters, archival research, personal correspondence, and periodicals. He also visited the battlefields of Bataan and Corregidor, as well as the prison itself, which remains in use by the government of the Republic of the Philippines.

The book was reviewed favorably by publications including Pittsburgh Magazine, World War II Magazine, Pittsburgh Post-Gazette, Arizona Republic, San Angelo Standard-Times, and Seattle Weekly. Booklist and Kirkus Reviews also gave the book plaudits. The author also received the 2011 Senator John Heinz Community Advocate Award from the Veterans' Leadership Program of Pittsburgh, for the book. A documentary film helmed by Lukacs, 4-4-43, was created about the book's subject matter.
