= Samuel Grashio =

United States Army Air Forces officer

Samuel Charles Grashio
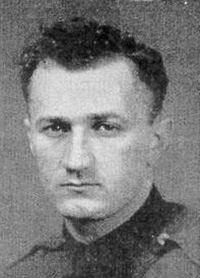
- Born: April 1, 1918; Spokane, Washington, U.S.
- Died: October 3, 1999 (aged 81); Spokane, Washington, U.S.
- Burial place: Holy Cross Cemetery; Spokane, Washington
- Relatives: Devonia Grashio (wife)
- Military career
- Allegiance: United States
- Branch: U.S. Army Air Corps; U.S. Army Air Forces; U.S Air Force
- Service years: 1940–1965
- Rank: Colonel
- Units: 21st Pursuit Squadron; 24th Pursuit Group
- Conflicts: World War II • Battle of Bataan
- Awards: Distinguished Service Cross; Silver Star (2); Bronze Star Medal

Samuel Charles Grashio (April 1, 1918 – October 3, 1999) was a United States Army Air Forces pilot who was captured by the Japanese in World War II. He survived the Bataan Death March and participated in the only successful mass escape from a Japanese prison camp.

Grashio was born and raised in Spokane, Washington. He enlisted in the Army Air Corps in September 1940. After training, he was sent to the Philippines, arriving in Manila on November 20, 1941, to join the 24th Pursuit Group's 21st Pursuit Squadron as a second lieutenant.

== World War II ==
On December 8, the same day as the attack on Pearl Harbor (on the other side of the International Date Line), he flew from Nichols Field to engage in aerial combat against the Japanese in his Curtis P-40E fighter airplane. Along with the rest of the 24th Group, he ended up at Bataan, where he flew the last combat mission on April 8, 1942. The Battle of Bataan ended the next day with an Allied surrender.

Grashio joined the other prisoners of war in the infamous Bataan Death March. He was imprisoned first at Camp O'Donnell, north of Manila. Two months later, he was transferred to a camp at Cabanatuan. Finally, in October, he was among 1000 prisoners judged fit to work; they were moved to a lumber camp on Mindanao (Davao Region) to engage in manual labor.

Grashio and his squadron commander, Lieutenant Ed Dyess, eight other Americans, including Austin Shofner, and two Filipinos escaped into the jungle on Sunday, April 4, 1943. One of the other Americans was USMC Lt. Jack Hawkins, who had organized the escape. After wandering for three days in the swamp, they contacted a band of Filipino guerrillas. They then joined the Mindanao guerrillas under the command of Lt. Col. Wendell Fertig. Over the course of the next few months, seven of the men were transported a few at a time by submarine to Australia while three stayed behind to continue fighting with the guerrillas. One of these, an Army Air Corps engineering officer named Leo Boelens, was eventually killed by the Japanese. Grashio and Luis Morgan escaped to Australia via submarine.

Grashio was awarded the Distinguished Service Cross and the Silver Star with cluster during the war.

== Later life ==
He rose to the rank of colonel before retiring in 1965. He then became the assistant to the President of Gonzaga University in Spokane.

He co-authored Return to Freedom: The War Memoirs of Colonel Samuel C. Grashio U.S.A.F. (1982, ISBN 0-912958-20-0) with Bernard Norling.

Grashio died in 1999. He was survived by his wife Devonia Grashio. She died in 2015. They had six children: daughters Patricia Ohlidal (deceased), Marilyn (Jim) Cline of Yakima, Judith Dawson, Mary Elizabeth Grashio, Celene (Tony) Riccelli and son Samuel (Laurie) Grashio, all of Spokane.

== Awards and decorations ==

Command Pilot
Distinguished Service Cross		Silver Star with bronze oak leaf cluster
Bronze Star Medal	Prisoner of War Medal	Air Force Presidential Unit Citation
American Defense Service Medal with bronze service star	American Campaign Medal	Asiatic-Pacific Campaign Medal with three bronze campaign stars
World War II Victory Medal	Army of Occupation Medal	National Defense Service Medal with bronze service star
Air Force Longevity Service Award with silver oak leaf cluster	Philippine Defense Medal	Philippine Republic Presidential Unit Citation

=== Distinguished Service Cross citation ===

Grashio, Samuel C.
Second Lieutenant (Air Corps), U.S. Army Air Forces
Philippine Guerilla Forces
Date of Action: April 4, 1943 to October 12, 1943

Citation:

The President of the United States of America, authorized by Act of Congress July 9, 1918, takes pleasure in presenting the Distinguished Service Cross to Second Lieutenant (Air Corps) Samuel Charles Grashio, United States Army Air Forces, for extraordinary heroism in connection with military operations against an armed enemy while serving with Philippine Guerilla Forces during the period 4 April 1943 through 12 October 1943. Second Lieutenant Grashio was one of ten men including two Naval Officers, three Air Corps Officers, and two Marine Corps Officers who escaped after nearly a year in captivity after the fall of Bataan and Corregidor. The ten men evaded their captors for days until connecting with Filipino Guerillas under Wendell Fertig. The officers remained with the guerillas for weeks, obtaining vital information which they carried with them when they were subsequently evacuated by American submarines. Their escape was the only mass escape from a Japanese prison camp during the war. The personal courage and zealous devotion to duty displayed by Second Lieutenant Grashio during this period have upheld the highest traditions of the military service and reflect great credit upon himself, the Prisoner of War, and the United States Army Air Forces.

== See also ==
- List of American guerrillas in the Philippines
- Ray C. Hunt
- Escape From Davao: The Forgotten Story of the Most Daring Prison Break of the Pacific War
