= Raymond H. Littge =

American flying ace (1923–1949)

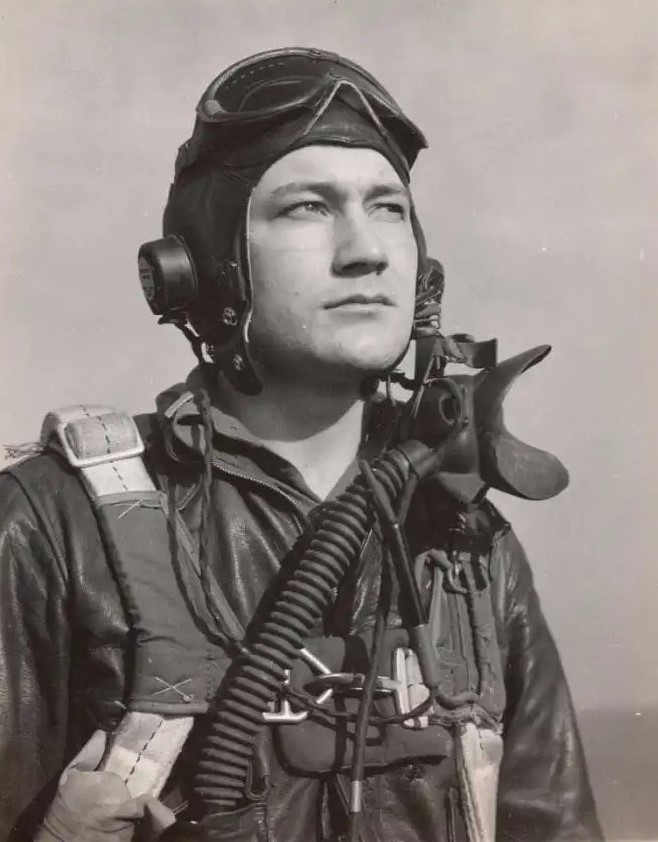
- Born: October 18, 1923; Altenburg, Missouri, U.S.
- Died: May 20, 1949 (aged 25); Maupin, Oregon, U.S.
- Burial place: Trinity Lutheran Church Cemetery; Altenburg, Missouri, U.S.
- Military career
- Branch: United States Air Force
- Service years: 1942–1949
- Rank: Captain
- Nickname: "Ray"
- Units: 487th Fighter Squadron; 352nd Fighter Group
- Conflicts: World War II
- Awards: Distinguished Service Cross; Silver Star; Distinguished Flying Cross; Air Medal (16)

Raymond Henry Littge (October 18, 1923 – May 20, 1949) was an American flying ace in the 352nd Fighter Group during World War II, who was credited with 23.5 aerial and ground victories.

== Early life ==
Littge was born on 1923 to Henry and Martha Ahner Littge. After his father died when he was at age 4, Littge, six brothers and a sister were raised by their mother. In 1939, he gained interest in flying and worked in a farm to pay for his flying lessons. He attended Altenberg High School for two years, but graduated from Perryville High School in 1942.

== Military career ==
After graduation from high school, Littge enlisted in the Aviation Cadet Program of the U.S. Army Air Forces on July 1, 1942, and was not inducted until January 19, 1943, at Jefferson Barracks, Missouri. Littge was commissioned a second lieutenant and awarded his pilot wings at Dale Mabry Field in Florida, on December 5, 1943.

=== World War II ===
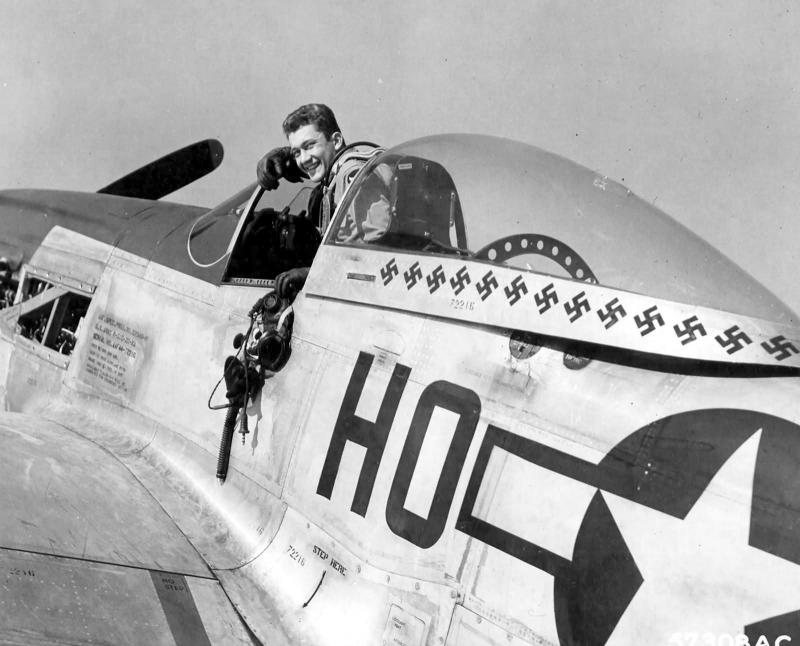
Littge onboard his P-51D "Miss Helen"

After completing training in the P-51 Mustang, Littge was assigned to the 487th Fighter Squadron of the 352nd Fighter Group. Based at RAF Bodney in Norfolk, England, he flew his first combat mission on July 1, 1944. On his 46th mission, Littge scored his first aerial victories, when he shot down two Messerschmitt Bf 109s on November 27, 1944. He finally became a flying ace, when he shot down three Focke-Wulf Fw 190s on December 27, bringing his total to five aerial victories. On a fighter sweep later in the year over France, he was shot down, but managed to bail out his aircraft. With the help of French Resistance, he escaped capture and managed to return to England within 12 days.

During the Battle of the Bulge, which started on December 16, the 487th Fighter Squadron was moved forward to airfield Y-29 near Asch, Belgium. On New Year's Day 1945, Littge was one of 12 Mustang pilots led by 487th FS commander John C. Meyer that had started their takeoff roll when a large formation of Fw 190s and Bf 109s hit the field. In the ensuing battle, Littge shot down two Fw 190s. For his heroism in the aerial battle, he was awarded the Silver Star.

Littge continued to score aerial and ground victories. On January 24, 1945, he shot down a Bf 109 over Bonn and on March 23, while leading the 'Yellow' flight, Littge attempted to attack a jet-powered Messerschmitt Me 262 that attacked a group of B-24 Liberators. After engaging in a 15-minute chase of the aircraft, he decided to break of the chase and to orbit around Rechlin–Lärz Airfield in the hopes of engaging a Me 262 in a landing pattern. Not long, he noticed another Me 262 approaching the airfield. Littge flew behind the Me 262 and fired at it, with strikes hitting the right engine of the aircraft. After engaging in brief evasive maneuvers, the Me 262 crashed, crediting Littge with his tenth and final aerial victory.

On April 17, 1945, Littge led his flight in attacking a German aerodrome in Plattling. Of the fourteen aircraft destroyed in the attack by the flight, Littge was personally credited in destroying six aircraft in the attack, while carrying out seven strafing attacks against the aerodrome despite his aircraft sustaining severe damage from anti-aircraft fire. For his heroism in the mission, he was awarded Distinguished Service Cross – the second only to Medal of Honor.

During World War II, Littge flew 91 combat missions and was credited with the destruction of 10.5 enemy aircraft in aerial combat plus 1 shared kill, and 13 destroyed on the ground while strafing enemy airfields. While serving with the 352nd FG, he flew P-51C and P-51Ds bearing the names "Silver Dollar", "E Pluribus Unium" and "Miss Helen". He was also credited in destroying three V-1 flying bombs over the English Channel, but they were not included in his overall aerial victory credits.

=== Post war ===
After the end of World War II, Littge returned to the United States in May 1945 and was assigned to Wright Patterson Air Force Base in Ohio, where he was part of the team evaluating captured German aircraft. During this time, he test flew a captured Me 262 and wrote an evaluation report for it.

Littge left active duty on December 19, 1946, and joined the United States Air Force Reserve. He returned to active duty on March 17, 1947, for jet training and was assigned as an operations officer for the 83d Fighter Squadron at Hamilton Air Force Base in California.

On May 20, 1949, Littge was flying an F-84 Thunderjet to an air meet at Coulee Dam in Washington, when his aircraft crashed near Maupin, Oregon, killing him. It is suspected that a faulty oxygen system of his aircraft was the cause of the crash.

Littge was buried at the Trinity Lutheran Church Cemetery in Altenburg, Missouri.

== Aerial victory credits ==
Chronicle of aerial victories
| Date | # | Type | Location | Aircraft flown | Unit Assigned |
|---|---|---|---|---|---|
| November 27, 1944 | 2 | Messerschmitt Bf 109 | Hamelin, Germany | P-51D Mustang | 487 FS, 352 FG |
| December 26, 1944 | 1 | Bf 109 | Ollheim, Germany | P-51D | 487 FS, 352 FG |
| December 27, 1944 | 3 | Focke Wulf Fw 190 | Mayen, Germany | P-51D | 487 FS, 352 FG |
| January 1, 1945 | 2 | Fw 190 | Liège, Belgium | P-51D | 487 FS, 352 FG |
| January 24, 1945 | 1 | Bf 109 | Bonn, Germany | P-51D | 487 FS, 352 FG |
| March 18, 1945 | 0.5 | Bf 109 | Bad Freienwalde, Germany | P-51D | 487 FS, 352 FG |
| March 25, 1945 | 1 | Messerschmitt Me 262 | Rechlin, Germany | P-51D | 487 FS, 352 FG |

SOURCES: Air Force Historical Study 85: USAF Credits for the Destruction of Enemy Aircraft, World War II

== Personal life ==
Littge married to Helen Susan, née Fischer, in 1945. The couple had two sons: Raymond Littge II and George Preddy Littge. Following Littge's death in 1949, Helen Littge remarried to James R. Starnes, a P-51 Mustang World War II flying ace in the 339th Fighter Group and later a colonel in the U.S. Air Force.

Littge's son Raymond II became a pilot in the U.S. Air Force and flew combat missions during the Vietnam War. He was killed in a flying accident in 1979, while flying an F-4 Phantom II in air combat maneuvers at Nellis Air Force Base in Nevada.

== Awards and honors ==
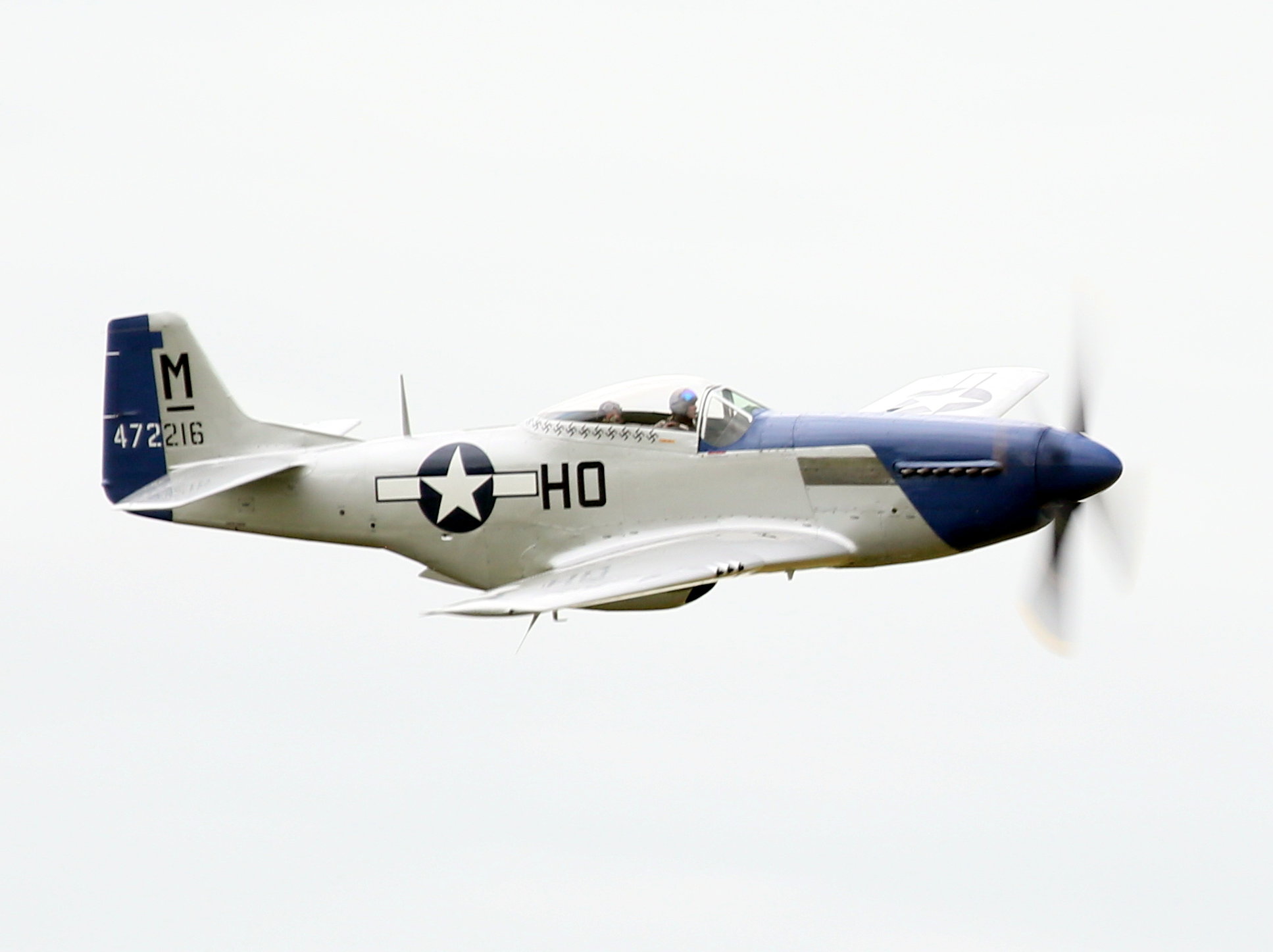
P-51D Mustang "Miss Helen" (G-BIXL) at the 2016 Flying Legends air show

His awards include:

USAF pilot badge
| Distinguished Service Cross |
| Silver Star |
| Distinguished Flying Cross |
| Air Medal with three silver oak leaf clusters |
| Air Force Presidential Unit Citation |
| Army Good Conduct Medal |
| American Campaign Medal |
| European-African-Middle Eastern Campaign Medal with silver campaign star |
| World War II Victory Medal |
| Air Force Longevity Service Award |

=== Distinguished Service Cross citation ===

Littge, Raymond H.
Captain (Air Corps), U.S. Army Air Forces
487th Fighter Squadron, 352nd Fighter Group, 8th Air Force
Date of Action: April 17, 1945

Citation:

The President of the United States of America, authorized by Act of Congress, July 9, 1918, takes pleasure in presenting the Distinguished Service Cross to Captain (Air Corps) Raymond Henry Littge, United States Army Air Forces, for extraordinary heroism in action while serving as Pilot of a P-51 Fighter Plane of the 487th Fighter Squadron, 352d Fighter Group, Eighth Air Force, in action while leading a flight of P-51 aircraft in a strafing attack on an airdrome at Plattling, Germany, on April 17, 1945. Captain Littge and his flight destroyed fourteen airplanes, of which Captain Littge personally accounted for six. During this attack, Captain Littge's airplane sustained severe damage, including one and one-half feet shot off the left-wing tip, damage to the oil line causing a serious leak, and a gaping hole where the middle gun of the left wing was also shot out. However, he carried out seven additional strafing attacks against the airdrome. The determination, coolness, and courage displayed by Captain Littge on this occasion reflects highest credit upon himself and the Armed Forces of the United States.

=== Additional honors ===
A memorial marker honoring him is placed at the intersection of North Jackson Street and West St. Maries Street in Perryville, Missouri.

Littge's P-51D 44–72216, nicknamed "Miss Helen" was sold to the Swedish Air Force, where it served at Swedish air bases in Östersund and Uppsala. After five years of service in Sweden, the aircraft was sold to the Israel Defense Forces in 1953. During its time in the Israeli Air Force, the aircraft was fitted with rocket rails and likely flew combat missions during the 1956 Sinai Campaign. After being retired from combat service, the aircraft remained in a children's playground at kibbutz Ein Gedi, where it was bought by Robert Lamplough, an English warbird collector. It was returned to England, where it was re-fitted with wings from P-51D 44–72770, and made airworthy. The aircraft was painted in the original 352nd Fighter Group colors and re-registered as G-BIXL. It is currently flown at air shows in the United Kingdom and is believed to be the only original 352nd FG P-51 that exists to this day.

Littge's exploits during Operation Bodenplatte on January 1, 1945, was featured in the "Death of the Luftwaffe", which was the sixteenth episode of the second season of the History Channel series Dogfights, which recreated historical air combat campaigns using modern computer graphics.
