= Virgil K. Meroney =

Colonel in the United States Air Force

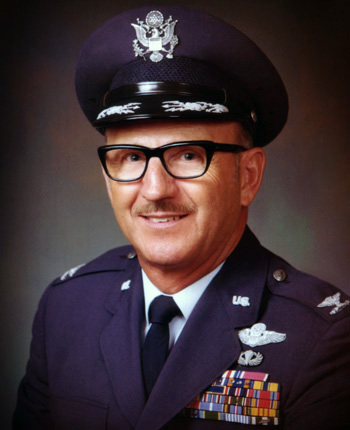
- Meroney in 1970
- Born: February 16, 1921; Pine Bluff, Arkansas, U.S.
- Died: June 27, 1980 (aged 59)
- Burial place: Graceland Cemetery, Pine Bluff
- Military career
- Allegiance: United States
- Branch: Arkansas National Guard; United States Army Air Forces; United States Air Force
- Service years: 1937–1970
- Rank: Colonel
- Units: 352nd Fighter Group; 8th Tactical Fighter Wing
- Commands: 561st Fighter Escort Squadron; 7th Fighter-Bomber Squadron; 80th Fighter-Bomber Squadron; 308th Tactical Fighter Squadron; 77th Tactical Fighter Squadron; 8th Tactical Fighter Wing
- Conflicts: World War II; Korean War; Vietnam War
- Awards: Silver Star; Legion of Merit; Distinguished Flying Cross (7); Purple Heart; Air Medal (16)

Virgil Kersh Meroney II (February 16, 1921 – June 27, 1980) was a United States Air Force colonel. During World War II, he became a flying ace credited with nine aerial victories while flying the P-47 Thunderbolt, making him the only P-47 ace in the 352nd Fighter Group. He himself was shot down and captured as a prisoner of war before his successful escape from captivity. He also flew missions during the Korean War and Vietnam War before he retired from the air force in 1970.

== Early life ==
On February 16, 1921, Meroney was born in Pine Bluff, Arkansas.

== Military career ==
In May 1937, he joined the Arkansas National Guard and was called to active duty in May 1940. In 1941, he married Mildred Louise, née Duckett (1921–2009). The couple had two sons: Virgil III and Douglas.

On March 27, 1942, he entered the flight training program of the United States Army Air Forces and earned his pilot wings. On October 30, 1942, he earned his commission as second lieutenant at Luke Field in Arizona.

=== World War II ===
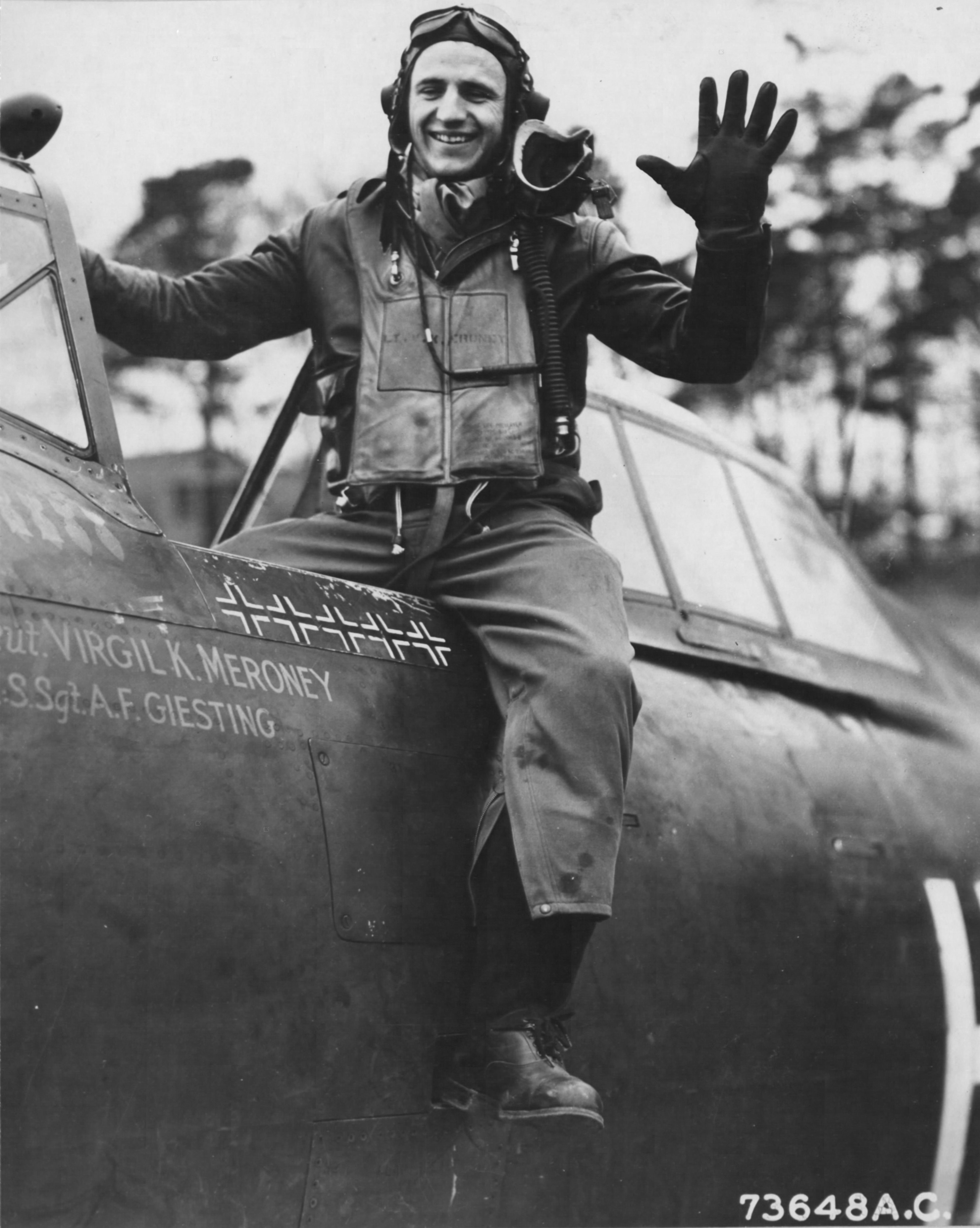
Meroney onboard his P-47 during WWII

In December 1942, Meroney was sent to Westover Field in Massachusetts where he was assigned to the 487th Fighter Squadron within the 352nd Fighter Group and in January 1943, he completed training in the P-47 Thunderbolt. In June 1943, the 352nd FG landed in the United Kingdom, and was assigned to RAF Bodney in Watton, Norfolk. Flying P-47s in combat, Meroney downed his first German plane and shared another aerial victory with a fellow fighter pilot on December 1, 1943.

Meroney scored his second aerial victory on December 4, 1943, along with a shared aerial victory. He shot down his fourth German plane on January 29, 1944, and on January 30, he shot down his fifth German plane, becoming the first flying ace in the 352nd Fighter Group.

Meroney continued to raise his aerial victory score. On March 8, while escorting American bombers withdrawing after the bombing mission over Berlin, Meroney's flight engaged three Bf 109s led by German flying ace Klaus Mietusch that was attempting to attack the bombers. As Mietusch attacked the bombers from the rear, he managed to shoot down one of the B-17s but in return was shot down by Meroney, forcing Mietusch to bail out of his aircraft, and thus crediting Meroney with his eighth aerial victory. On March 16, he shot down his ninth German plane, which would be his last aerial victory of the war. In April 1944, the 352nd FG converted to the P-51 Mustang. On April 8, 1944, while strafing a German airfield, Meroney was shot down by anti-aircraft fire and he bailed out of his crippled P-51. He was captured by the Germans and was held as a prisoner of war until April 1945, when he escaped captivity and managed to reach American forces advancing towards the Rhine.

During World War II, Meroney was credited in destroying nine enemy aircraft plus two shared and one damaged. For his aerial exploits during the war, he was awarded the Silver Star, five Distinguished Flying Crosses and four Air Medals. While serving with the 352nd FG, his P-47 was named after his wife, bearing the name "Sweet Louise".

=== Cold War ===
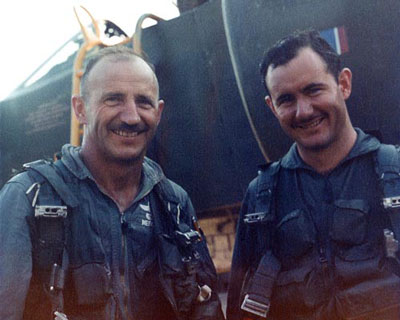
Meroney with his son Virgil III at Ubon Royal Thai Air Force Base during the Vietnam War. Virgil III was killed in action during the war in March 1969.

Following his return to the U.S., from August 1945 to January 1946 Meroney was a flying instructor at Luke Field and continued to serve in the newly created United States Air Force. From 1950, he commanded the 561st Fighter Escort Squadron of the 12th Fighter Escort Group and led the unit to England from July to December 1951. He was later assigned to the 1211th Test Squadron in the Kwajalein Atoll from September to November 1952, where he took part in sampling missions in the aftermath of the Operation Ivy nuclear tests.

From May to August 1953, he was assigned to Japan where he flew F-84 Thunderjets in combat during the last months of the Korean War. Meroney served in a variety of command and staff positions over the next 15 years. In 1968, during the Vietnam War, he was assigned to the 8th Tactical Fighter Wing at Ubon Royal Thai Air Force Base where he served as Deputy Commander for Operations and later as Vice Commander, and flew F-4 Phantom II in combat missions. He flew 141 combat missions and managed to fly at least two combat missions with his son Virgil III, before his son was killed in action on March 1, 1969, after his aircraft was shot down by anti-aircraft fire during a nighttime strike mission against enemy targets in Khammouan province, Laos.

Meroney returned to the United States in February 1969 and was assigned to the Headquarters Tactical Air Command at Langley Air Force Base in Virginia, where he served as Assistant Chief of Safety and later as Chief of Safety before retiring from the air force on December 31, 1970.

== Later life ==
Meroney died of cancer on June 27, 1980, at the age of 59. He was buried at Graceland Cemetery in Pine Bluff.

== Aerial victory credits ==
Date	#	Type	Aircraft flown	Unit assigned
December 1, 1943	1	Bf 109	P-47D	487 FS, 352 FG
December 1, 1943	0.5	Me 210/Bf 110	P-47D	487 FS, 352 FG
December 4, 1943	1	Bf 109	P-47D	487 FS, 352 FG
December 4, 1943	0.5	Fw 190	P-47D	487 FS, 352 FG
January 29, 1944	1	Fw 190	P-47D	487 FS, 352 FG
January 30, 1944	1	Bf 109	P-47D	487 FS, 352 FG
February 3, 1944	1	Fw 190	P-47D	487 FS, 352 FG
March 8, 1944	1	Bf 109	P-47D	487 FS, 352 FG
March 10, 1944	1	Bf 109	P-47D	487 FS, 352 FG
March 16, 1944	1	Bf 109	P-47D	487 FS, 352 FG

SOURCES: Air Force Historical Study 85: USAF Credits for the Destruction of Enemy Aircraft, World War II

== Awards and decorations ==
U.S. Air Force Command Pilot Badge
U.S. Air Force Parachutist Badge

Silver Star
Legion of Merit
Distinguished Flying Cross with "V" device, silver and bronze oak leaf clusters
Purple Heart
Air Medal with three silver oak leaf clusters
Air Force Commendation Medal
Air Force Presidential Unit Citation
Air Force Outstanding Unit Award with "V" device and bronze oak leaf cluster
Prisoner of War Medal (Note: In 1985 this award was made retroactive to all U.S. military personnel who were prisoners of war.)
Combat Readiness Medal
American Defense Service Medal
American Campaign Medal
European-African-Middle Eastern Campaign Medal with bronze campaign star
World War II Victory Medal
National Defense Service Medal with bronze service star
Korean Service Medal with bronze campaign star
Armed Forces Expeditionary Medal
Vietnam Service Medal with bronze campaign star
Air Force Longevity Service Award with silver and bronze oak leaf clusters
Small Arms Expert Marksmanship Ribbon
Republic of Vietnam Air Service Medal, Honor Class
Republic of Vietnam Gallantry Cross Unit Citation
United Nations Service Medal for Korea
Vietnam Campaign Medal
Korean War Service Medal (Note: In 2000 this award was made retroactive to all U.S. military personnel who served in the Korean War.)
