= Carl J. Luksic =

US Air Force lieutenant colonel and flying ace

Carl John Luksic
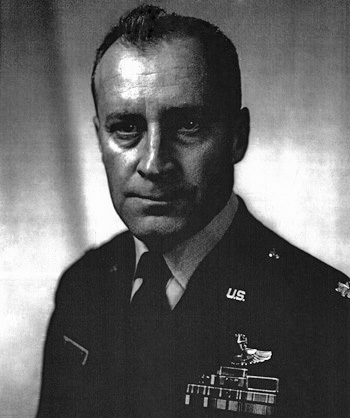
- Born: June 20, 1921; Honolulu, Territory of Hawaii
- Died: May 24, 2009 (aged 87) Panama City, Florida, U.S.
- Allegiance: United States of America
- Branch: United States Army Air Forces; United States Air Force
- Service years: 1942–1969
- Rank: Lieutenant Colonel
- Conflicts: World War II
- Awards: Distinguished Service Cross; Distinguished Flying Cross (4); Air Medal (4)

Carl John Luksic (June 20, 1921 – May 24, 2009) was a United States Air Force lieutenant colonel. During World War II, he became a flying ace credited with 8.5 aerial victories, including five in one day for which he was awarded the Distinguished Service Cross. He himself was shot down and taken as a prisoner of war before his successful escape from captivity.

== Early life and World War II ==
Carl J. Luksic was born on June 20, 1921, at Schofield Barracks in Honolulu, Territory of Hawaii. He enlisted in the United States Army Air Forces on March 22, 1942, where he entered the Aviation Cadet Training Program. Luksic earned his wings and was commissioned as a second lieutenant on October 30, 1942, at Luke Field, Arizona.

Luksic was assigned to the 487th Fighter Squadron, 352nd Fighter Group, flying P-47 Thunderbolts at Westover Field, Massachusetts, in January 1943. The squadron soon moved to Trumbull Field, Connecticut, and then Mitchel Field, New York in March, before deploying to England in July 1943.

=== Flying ace ===
Luksic's squadron was attached to the Eight Air Force and stationed at RAF Bodney in Norfolk, England. In April 1944, his squadron transitioned to P-51 Mustangs. Luksic soon claimed his first two aerial victories.

On May 8, 1944, First Lieutenant Luksic's flight attacked 15 German planes which were attacking friendly bombers. Luksic shot two down before he was separated from his flight, yet he managed to engage and shoot down a third plane, claiming ace status. He then rejoined two friendly planes and assisted in attacking 20 more enemy planes, claiming two more victories. Luksic then used the remainder of his ammunition to strafe and destroy four oil tank train cars. For his actions, Luksic was awarded the Distinguished Service Cross two days later. He was the first pilot attached to the Eighth Air Force to become an ace in a day.

Luksic claimed one more aerial victory and assisted in shooting down a ninth plane during the war. He also destroyed multiple enemy aircraft on the ground.

=== Prisoner of war ===
On May 24, First Lieutenant Luksic was shot down over Germany. He was discovered hiding in bushes by a German farmer, who turned him in to the German authorities. Luksic was subsequently taken to Stalag Luft III as a prisoner of war.

After two failed attempts at escaping, Luksic successfully escaped from the camp with another soldier in March 1945. The two men spent 45 days walking through the woods. They scavenged and stole any food and supplies they could. Reaching the Rhine River, they made contact with a patrol from the 3rd Armored Division on April 18, thus ending their ordeal.

== Post-war career and life ==
Luksic returned to the United States in May. He returned to Luke Field as a flight instructor, and later instructed at Williams Field, Arizona, until October 1948. He later attended Central Gunnery School at RAF Leconfield in East Yorkshire, England, before serving as an instructor at Nellis Air Force Base, Nevada until mid 1952.

Throughout the 1950s, Major Luksic served as the commanding officer of several squadrons in Texas and Florida. He commanded several other squadrons in California and Florida during the early 1960s, and even served as South Korean Air Force advisor at Suwon Auxiliary Airfield. Luksic retired from the Air Force with the rank of lieutenant colonel on December 1, 1969.

Luksic died in Panama City, Florida on May 29, 2009. He was subsequently buried in Panama City.

== Awards and decorations ==
His awards include:

USAF Command pilot badge
Distinguished Service Cross
Distinguished Flying Cross with three bronze oak leaf clusters
Air Medal with three bronze oak leaf clusters
Air Force Presidential Unit Citation
Prisoner of War Medal
Combat Readiness Medal
American Campaign Medal
European-African-Middle Eastern Campaign Medal with two bronze campaign stars
World War II Victory Medal
Army of Occupation Medal with 'Germany' clasp
National Defense Service Medal with bronze service star
Korea Defense Service Medal
Air Force Longevity Service Award with silver oak leaf cluster
Armed Forces Reserve Medal with silver hourglass device

=== Distinguished Service Cross citation ===
Luksic, Carl J
First Lieutenant, U.S Army Air Forces
487th Fighter Squadron, 332nd Fighter Group, 8th Air Force
Date of Action: May 8, 1944
Headquarters, U.S. Strategic Forces in Europe, General Orders No. 28 (May 10, 1944)
Citation:

The President of the United States of America, authorized by Act of Congress, July 9, 1918, takes pleasure in presenting the Distinguished Service Cross to First Lieutenant (Air Corps) Carl John Luksic, United States Army Air Forces, for extraordinary heroism in connection with military operations against an armed enemy while serving as Pilot of a P-51 Fighter Airplane in the 487th Fighter Squadron, 332nd Fighter Group, Eighth Air Force, in aerial combat against enemy forces on 8 May 1944, in the European Theater of Operations. On this date Lieutenant Luksic with his flight attacked and dispersed a force of more than fifteen enemy fighters which were engaging a friendly bomber formation and through the aggressiveness of his attack destroyed two enemy planes. Finding himself separated from his flight, he fearlessly continued his attacks and destroyed a third enemy plane. He then joined two friendly fighters and led them in determined attack against more than twenty enemy fighters, and running short of fuel and ammunition, Lieutenant Luksic displayed further will and determination to damage the enemy by expending his remaining ammunition in destroying four oil tank cars on a railway siding. The extraordinary heroism and aggressiveness displayed by Lieutenant Luksic in the face of overwhelming odds reflect highest credit upon himself and the Armed Forces of the United States.

== Aerial victory credits ==
Chronicle of aerial victories
Date	#	Type	Location	Aircraft flown	Unit Assigned
April 10, 1944	0.5	Focke-Wulf Fw 190	Reims, France	North American P-51B Mustang	487 FS, 352 FG
April 20, 1944	1.5	Messerschmitt Bf 109	Paris, France	P-51B	487 FS, 352 FG
May 08, 1944	3; 2	Fw 190; Bf 109	Brunswick, Germany	P-51B	487 FS, 352 FG
May 13, 1944	0.5	Junkers Ju 88	Neubrandenburg, Germany	P-51B	487 FS, 352 FG
May 19, 1944	1	Bf 109	Ludwigslust, Germany	P-51B	487 FS, 352 FG

SOURCES: Air Force Historical Study 85: USAF Credits for the Destruction of Enemy Aircraft, World War II
