= William T. Halton =

WWII flying ace

William Timothy Halton
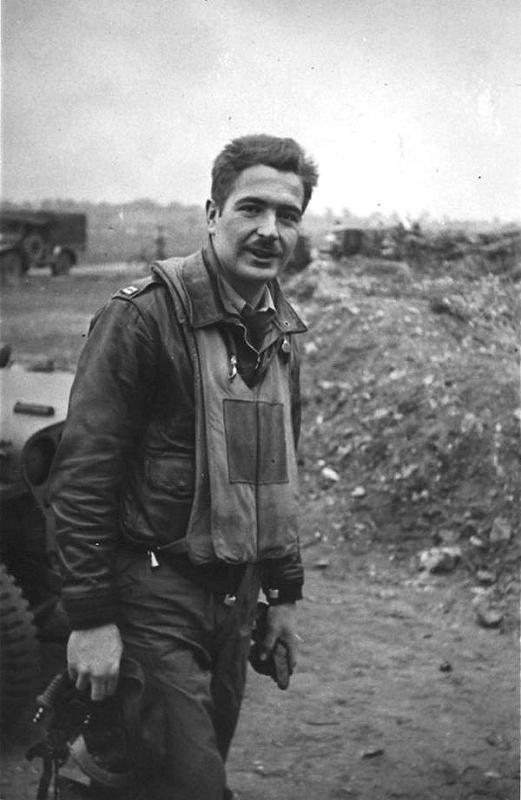
- Born: July 17, 1917; Providence, Rhode Island, U.S.
- Died: May 21, 1952 (aged 34) †; Korea †
- Military career
- Allegiance: United States of America
- Branch: United States Army Air Forces (1941–1947); United States Air Force (1947–1952)
- Service years: 1941–1952
- Rank: Colonel
- Nicknames: "Bill", "Wild Bill"
- Units: 352nd Fighter Group; 136th Fighter-Bomber Group; 18th Fighter Bomber Group
- Commands: 487th Fighter Squadron; 352nd Fighter Group; 136th Fighter-Bomber Group
- Conflicts: World War II; Korean War
- Awards: Distinguished Service Cross; Silver Star; Distinguished Flying Cross (4); Bronze Star; Purple Heart; Air Medal (18)

William Timothy Halton (July 17, 1917 – May 21, 1952) was a United States Army Air Force fighter ace in the 352nd Fighter Group who was credited with shooting down 10.5 aircraft during World War II. He was killed in action in 1952, during the Korean War.

== Early life ==
Halton was born on 1917, in Providence, Rhode Island.

== Military career ==
On August 18, 1941, he enlisted in the Aviation Cadet Program of the U.S. Army Air Forces and on March 7, 1942, he was commissioned a second lieutenant and was awarded his pilot wings.

=== World War II ===
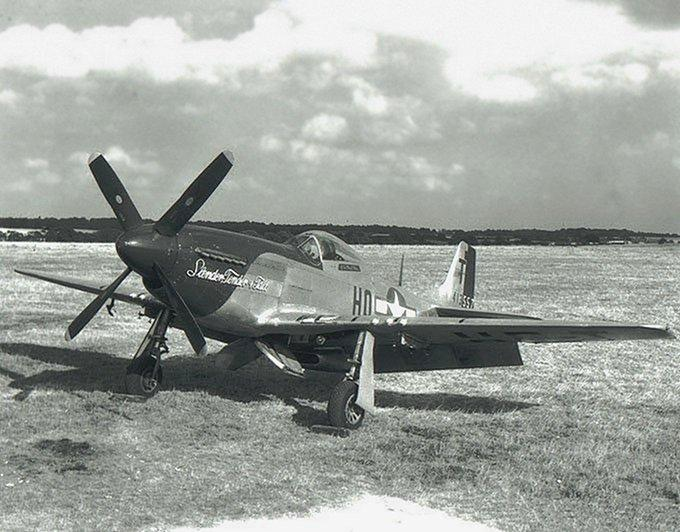
Halton's P-51 Mustang "Slender, Tender & Tall"

After completing P-47 Thunderbolt training, he was assigned to the 328th Fighter Squadron of the 352nd Fighter Group in England in December 1943. Stationed at RAF Bodney in Watton, Norfolk, the unit was under the operational control of the 67th Fighter Wing, VIII Fighter Command.

Flying P-47s, Halton scored his first aerial victory on February 20, 1944, when he shot down a Messerschmitt Bf 109 over Leuven, Belgium. In April 1944, the 352nd FG converted from P-47 to P-51 Mustang, and Halton won't score additional aerial victories until November 2, 1944, when he shot a Bf 109 over Merseburg, Germany. On the same month, he was promoted to major and was appointed as commander of the 487th Fighter Squadron. He shot down two more enemy aircraft on November 27 and December 26, 1944.

During the Battle of the Bulge, which started on December 16, the 487th FS was moved forward to airfield Y-29 near Asch, Belgium. His biggest day came on December 27, 1944, when he shot down four Bf 109s, including one shared destruction, at the southwest of Bonn, Germany, while leading his flight in an area patrol. On New Year's Day 1945, Halton led his flight of four P-51s that an attacked a large formation of Fw 190s and Bf 109s that attempted to cripple Allied air forces in the Low Countries. In the ensuing battle, Halton shot down one Fw 190. For his heroism in the aerial battle, he was awarded the Silver Star.

He scored his last two aerial victories on January 24 and March 18, 1945, During World War II, Halton was credited with the destruction of 10.5 enemy aircraft in aerial combat plus 1 shared destruction and 2 destroyed on the ground while strafing enemy airfields. While serving with the 352nd FG, he flew P-47 and P-51s bearing the name "Slender, Tender & Tall".

=== Post-war and Korea ===
After the end of World War II, he promoted to lieutenant colonel in July 1945 and was appointed as commander of the 352nd Fighter Group in September 1945. He left from active duty on March 26, 1946, but returned on July 5, 1946. He continued to serve in the newly created U.S. Air Force.

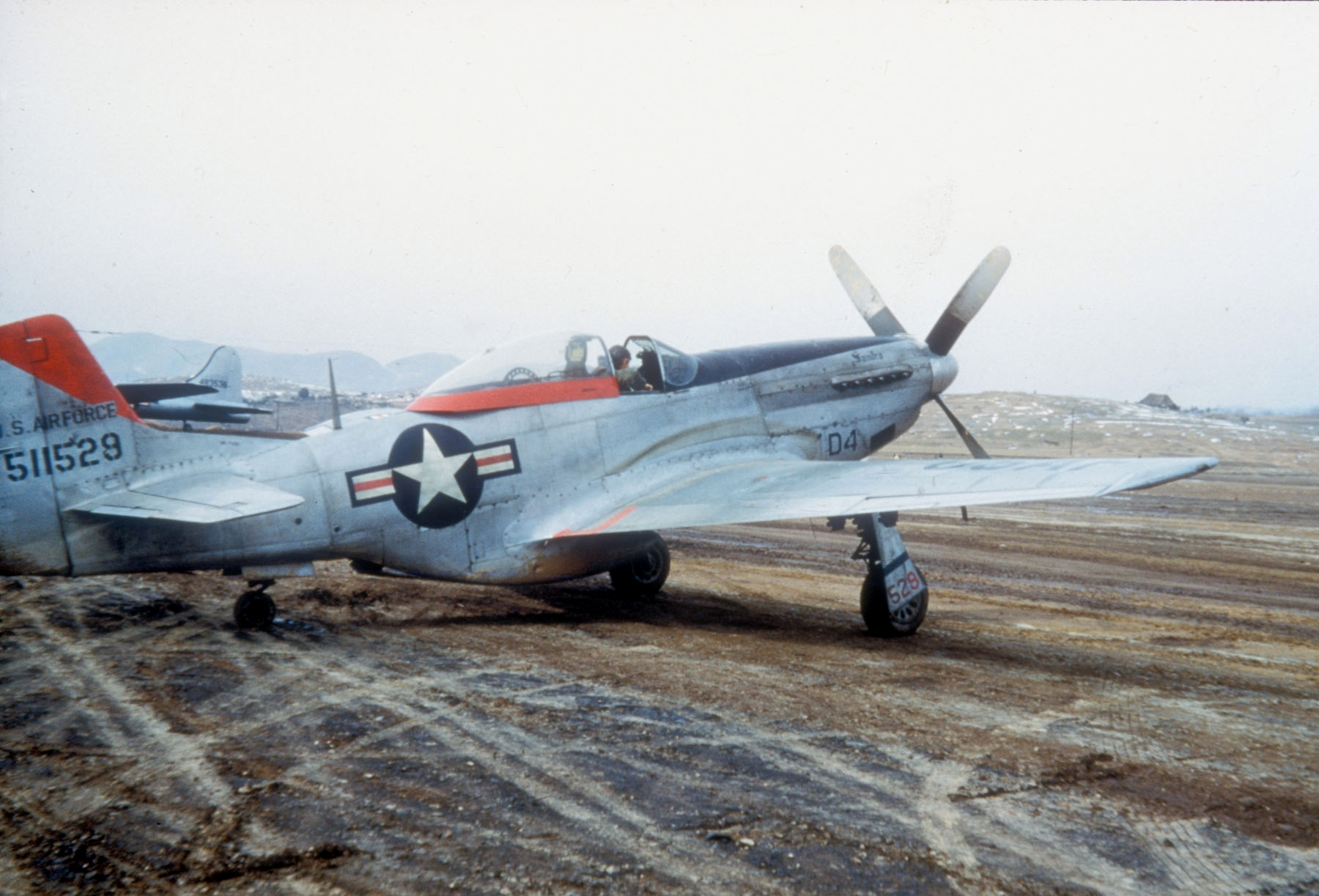
18th FBG F-51 Mustang in Korea

Following the outbreak of the Korean War in 1950, Halton was assigned as commander of the 136th Fighter-Bomber Group at Itazuke Air Force Base, which was equipped with the F-51 Mustangs. The unit moved from Japan to Taegu Air Base in South Korea, where it primarily flew interdiction missions against North Korean rail transportation. After a completion of a number of missions in his normal tour, he was appointed as the deputy commander of the 18th Fighter Bomber Group. However, he persisted in his desire to fly combat missions, and made a special request to fly additional missions in order to improve 18th FBG's combat effectiveness, and on a mission on April 6, 1952, he showed that F-51s can successfully operate in jet combat zones without fighter-interceptor escort, by leading his flight on a dive-bombing attack on rail lines near Sonchon County, North Korea. Even through being attacked by Communist MiG-15s and intense ground fire, he pressed on his attack on the rail lines and disregarded his personal safety. Despite the attacks against his flight, Halton's flight was responsible for destroying numerous rail lines. He also led his flight in the reconnaissance of the main supply route to Sinuiju, leading to the mission being successful.

On May 21, 1952, he took off from Hoengsong (K-46) Air Base to attack enemy artillery positions near the Korean Demilitarized Zone. On his first pass over the target, his F-51 was shot down by anti-aircraft fire. He was not seen to bail out his aircraft and his wingmen reported that the crash was not survivable. Prisoners of war who were released from North Korean custody at the end of the war mentioned not having any contact with Halton. He was not seen at any known holding point, interrogation center, hospital, or permanent prisoner of war camp.

His remains were never recovered and was declared missing in action. He is memorialized on the Courts of the Missing at the National Memorial Cemetery of the Pacific in Hawaii. He was also posthumously awarded the Distinguished Service Cross for his April 6, 1952 mission.

== Aerial victory credits ==
Date	#	Type	Location	Aircraft flown	Unit Assigned
February 20, 1944	1	Messerschmitt Bf 109	Leuven, Belgium	P-47D Thunderbolt	328 FS, 352 FG
November 2, 1944	1	Bf 109	Merseburg, Germany	P-51D Mustang	487 FS, 352 FG
November 27, 1944	1	Bf 109	Hameln, Germany	P-51D	487 FS, 352 FG
December 26, 1944	1	Bf 109	Bonn, Germany	P-51D	487 FS, 352 FG
December 27, 1944	3.5	Bf 109	Bonn, Germany	P-51D	487 FS, 352 FG
January 1, 1944	1	Focke-Wulf Fw 190	Liège, Belgium	P-51D	487 FS, 352 FG
January 24, 1945	1	Bf 109	Köhn, Germany	P-51D	487 FS, 352 FG
March 18, 1945	1	Bf 109	Bad Freienwalde, Germany	P-51D	487 FS, 352 FG

SOURCES: Air Force Historical Study 85: USAF Credits for the Destruction of Enemy Aircraft, World War II

== Awards and decorations ==
His awards include:

USAF Senior pilot badge
Distinguished Service Cross
Silver Star
Distinguished Flying Cross with "V" device and three bronze oak leaf clusters
Bronze Star Medal
Purple Heart
Air Medal with three silver and one bronze oak leaf clusters
Air Medal (second ribbon required for accoutrement spacing)
Air Force Presidential Unit Citation with bronze oak leaf cluster
American Defense Service Medal
American Campaign Medal
European-African-Middle Eastern Campaign Medal with silver and bronze campaign stars
World War II Victory Medal
Army of Occupation Medal with 'Germany' and 'Japan' clasps
National Defense Service Medal
Korean Service Medal with two bronze campaign stars
Air Force Longevity Service Award with bronze oak leaf cluster
Republic of Korea Presidential Unit Citation
United Nations Service Medal for Korea
Korean War Service Medal (Note: In 2000 this award was made retroactive to all U.S. military personnel who served in the Korean War.)

=== Distinguished Service Cross citation ===

Halton, William T.
Colonel, U.S. Air Force
18th Fighter-Bomber Wing, 5th Air Force
Date of Action: April 6, 1952

Citation:

The President of the United States of America, under the provisions of the Act of Congress approved July 9, 1918, takes pride in presenting the Distinguished Service Cross (Air Force) (Posthumously) to Colonel William Timothy Halton, United States Air Force, for extraordinary heroism in connection with military operations against an armed enemy of the United Nations while serving as Deputy Commander of the 18th Fighter-Bomber Wing, in action against enemy forces in the Republic of Korea on 6 April 1952. Upon completion of a normal tour with the 136th Fighter-Bomber Group, Colonel Halton was assigned as Deputy Commander of the 18th Fighter-Bomber Wing with specific instructions not to fly combat missions. Colonel Halton persisted in his desire to fly in combat, and made a special request to fly additional missions in order to improve the Group's combat effectiveness by his own example. Colonel Halton set such an example by masterfully demonstrating that F-51 type aircraft could successfully operate in jet combat zones without fighter-interceptor cover. He demonstrated great heroism and superior airmanship in leading his flight on a dive-bombing attack on rail lines near Sonchon, Korea. Even through being attacked by a MIG and intense ground fire, Colonel Halton completely disregarded personal safety, pressing a vicious attack on the rail lines. Although the flight was attacked by enemy jet aircraft and subjected to heavy ground fire, Colonel Halton's inspiring leadership was responsible for numerous rail outs by the four aircraft in his flight. Undaunted by the fact that the enemy was increasing his operations in that area, Colonel Halton then led a reconnaissance of the main supply route to Sinuiju. The result of this highly successful mission was measured by the boost in the morale of the pilots. Through his extraordinary heroism, exemplary leadership, and devotion to duty above and beyond that normally expected, Colonel Halton reflected great credit upon himself, the Far East Air Forces, and the United States Air Force.

== See also ==
- List of World War II aces from the United States
- List of World War II flying aces
