= Glennon T. Moran =

American flying ace (1921–2020)

Glennon Timothy Moran
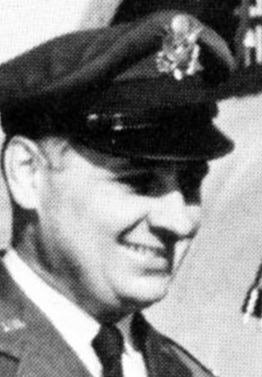
- Brig Gen. Glennon T. Moran
- Born: March 6, 1919; St. Louis, Missouri, U.S.
- Died: September 3, 1986 (aged 67); St. Louis County, Missouri, U.S.
- Burial place: Jefferson Barracks National Cemetery
- Military career
- Allegiance: United States of America
- Branch: United States Army Air Forces; Missouri Air National Guard
- Service years: 1942–1973
- Rank: Brigadier General
- Nickname: "Bubbles"
- Units: 487th Fighter Squadron, 352nd Fighter Group; 131st Tactical Fighter Wing
- Commands: 110th Tactical Fighter Squadron; 131st Tactical Fighter Wing
- Conflicts: World War II; Cold War
- Awards: Silver Star; Distinguished Flying Cross (6); Air Medal (4)

Glennon Timothy Moran (March 6, 1919 – September 3, 1986) was a brigadier general in the Missouri Air National Guard. During World War II, he was a flying ace credited with 13 aerial victories.

== Early life ==
Moran was born on 1919 in St. Louis, Missouri. In 1939, he graduated from Shurtleff College and Saint Louis University in 1941.

== Military career ==
In February 1942, Moran entered military service in the U.S. Army Signal Corps as a private. On July 31, he entered into the Aviation Cadet Program of the United States Army Air Forces and on March 25, 1943, he was commissioned as a second lieutenant and awarded his pilot wings at Craig Field in Alabama.

=== World War II ===
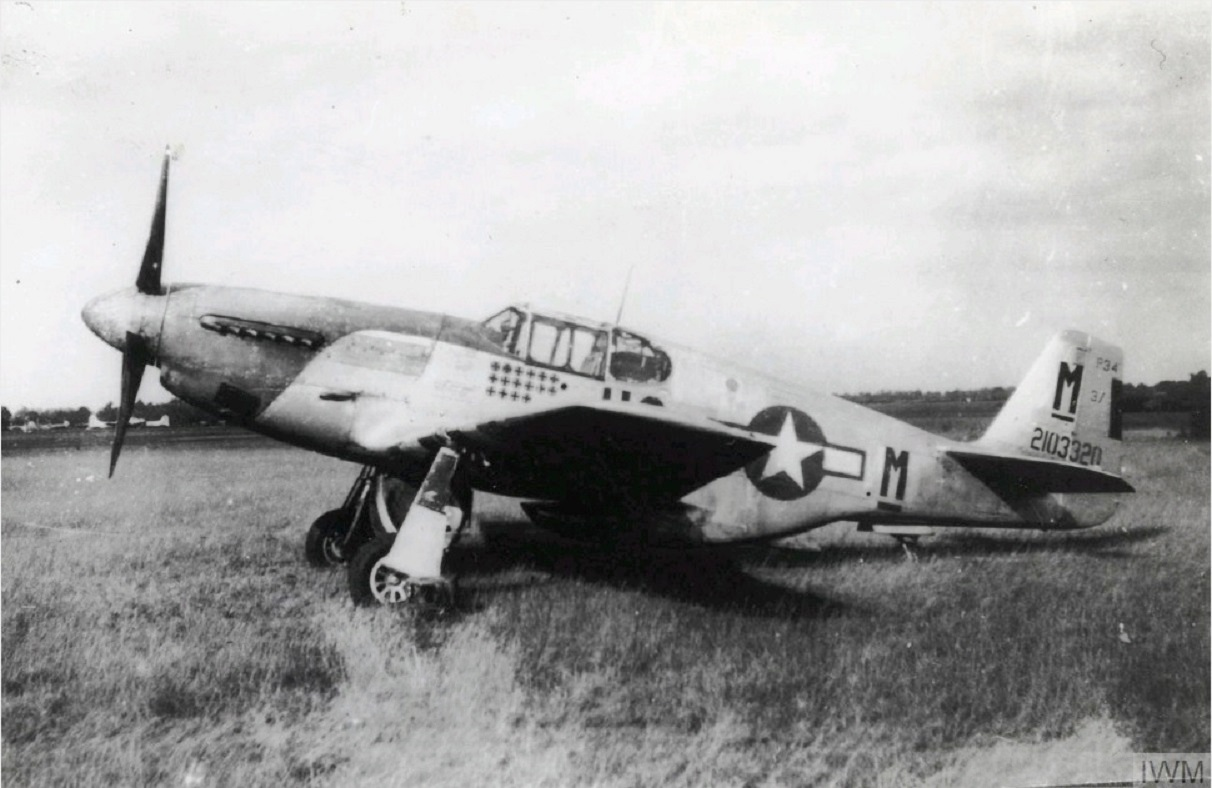
Moran's P-51B "Miss Ann"

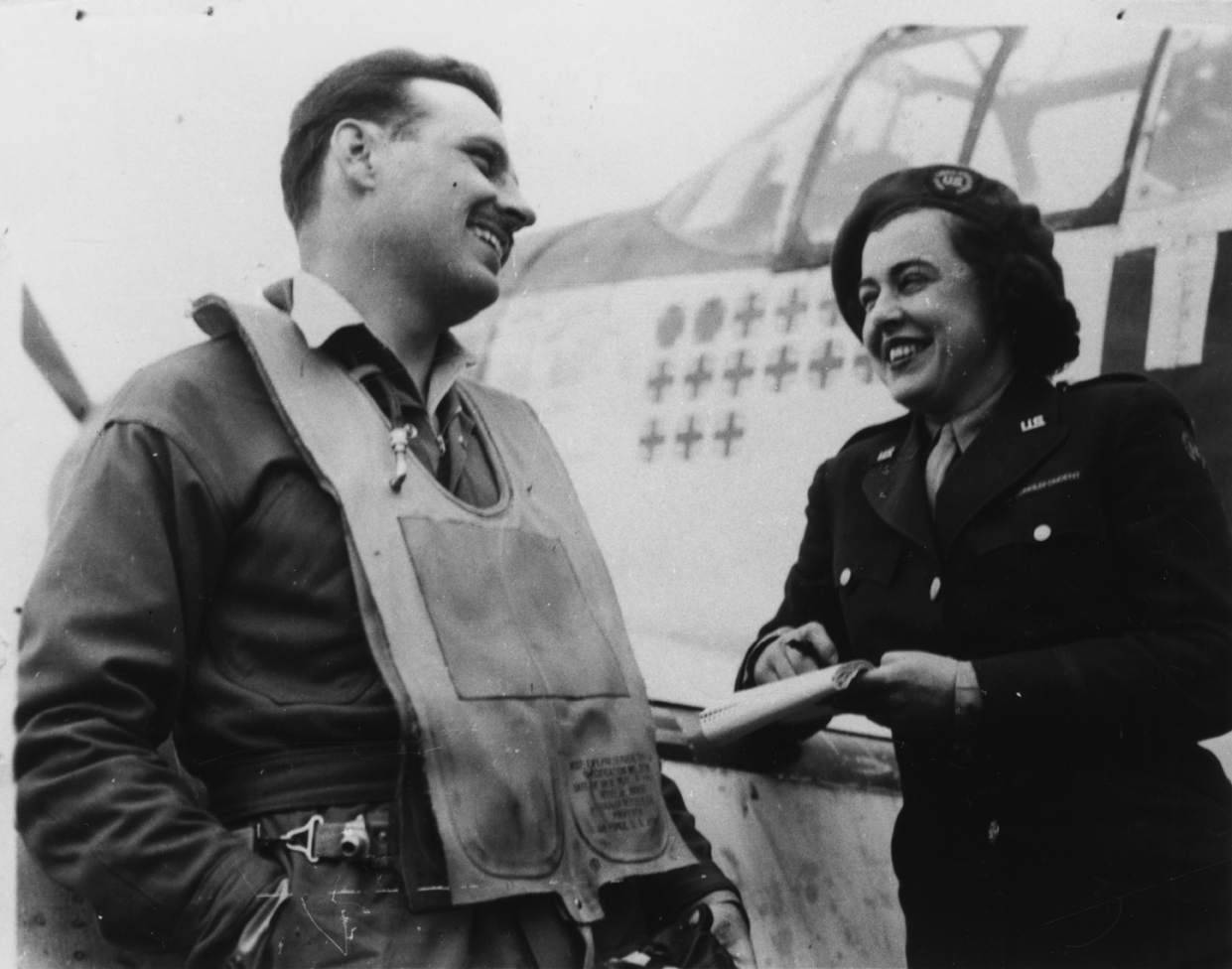
Moran being interviewed by war correspondent Virginia Irwin. Moran's interview can be read (here).

In July 1943, Moran was assigned to the 487th Fighter Squadron of the 352nd Fighter Group at RAF Bodney in England. Flying the P-47 Thunderbolt, Moran shot down a Messerschmitt Bf 109 on February 24, 1944, his first aerial victory. In April 1944, the 352nd FG converted to North American P-51 Mustangs. On May 13, he was credited with the shared destruction of a twin-engine Junkers Ju 88 and on May 19, he shot down another Bf 109, his third aerial victory.

On May 27, 1944, Moran was part of flight escorting bombers over Strasbourg, France. During the escort, they encountered a formation of 75 Bf 109s and Focke-Wulf Fw 190s. Moran was attacked by a Bf 109 but managed to outrun, resulting the Bf 109 breaking away from chasing Moran. After noticing another Bf 109 firing at him from the behind, Moran performed a vertical renversement and managed to turn with the Bf 109. He then managed to shoot at the Bf 109, resulting in its pilot bailing out and the aircraft crashing. While climbing back to join the bombers, Moran noticed another Bf 109. After battling it for 20 minutes, Moran managed to shoot it down. By the end of the mission, he had downed two Bf 109s.

On May 29, 1944, while flying in the vicinity of Güstrow, Germany, he shot down a Fw 190 and two Bf 109s, with one of the Bf 109 being a shared destruction. On May 30, at vicinity of Uelzen, Germany. Moran and his flight encountered 20 enemy aircraft formation. Attacking them, Moran managed to damage a Fw 190 and down another Fw 190, resulting in the formation to be dispersed. He then spotted a Bf 109 attempting to land at an aerodrome. He dived and shot down the Bf 109. For his heroism in the mission, he was awarded the Silver Star and his total aerial victories bought to 9, making him a flying ace.

Moran downed three more enemy aircraft in June 1944. His 13th and final aerial victory was on August 5, 1944, when shot down a Bf 109 over Hamburg, Germany. During World War II, while flying 90 missions, Moran was credited with the destruction of 13 enemy aircraft in aerial combat plus two shared destructions, 3 damaged, and 3 destroyed on the ground while strafing enemy airfields. While serving with the 352nd FG, he flew a P-51 bearing the name "Miss Ann".

After his return to the United States in late 1944, Moran was assigned as a flight leader with the 29th Fighter Squadron, which was part of the first operational jet fighter group in the United States. In April 1945, he promoted to captain and in October 1945, he was released from active duty and joined the Air Force Reserve.

=== Post war ===
In July 1946, he joined the Missouri Air National Guard and in 1947, he graduated from Washington University in St. Louis with Bachelor of Laws degree. In May 1948, he was promoted to major. In 1949, he attended orientation course at the Air Command and Staff College in Maxwell Air Force Base in Alabama.

In 1951, he entered active duty during the Korean War. He assigned as operations officer for the 42nd Air Division and as Chief of Fighter Branch of the 15th Air Force. In July 1952, he was released from active duty and was reassigned to the Missouri ANG as the commander of the 110th Tactical Fighter Squadron and simultaneously served as the Director of Operations for 131st Wing. In February 1957, he was promoted to colonel and in March 1961, he was appointed as commander of the 131st Tactical Fighter Wing. During the Berlin Crisis of 1961, Moran re-entered active duty and led the overseas deployment of 110th Tactical Fighter Squadron along with its support elements. On 1962, following the demobilization of 131st Wing, Moran was released from active duty and received federal recognition for the rank of brigadier general. In 1964, he attended general officer orientation course at Air War College at Maxwell Air Force Base. He retired in 1973 from military service, at the rank of brigadier general.

== Later life ==
Moran married Dolores Scharf in 1946. The couple had seven children, and numerous grand and great-grandchildren.

In 1962, while in active duty with the military, he unsuccessfully ran for Democratic Party nomination for the Missouri's 2nd congressional district. In 1965, Moran was appointed as liquor control supervisor by then Governor of Missouri Warren E. Hearnes. In 1966, he won the Democratic Party nomination for the election for Prosecuting Attorney of St. Louis County but was defeated by Republican Gene McNary in the general election.

Moran died of cancer on September 3, 1986, at the age of 67. Following his death, his body was donated to Washington University School of Medicine before being buried at the Jefferson Barracks National Cemetery in St. Louis County, Missouri on June 15, 1988.

== Aerial victory credits ==
Chronicle of aerial victories
Date	#	Type	Location	Aircraft flown	Unit Assigned
February 24, 1944	1	Messerschmitt Bf 109	Enschede, Netherlands	P-47 Thunderbolt	487 FS, 352 FG
May 13, 1944	0.5	Junkers Ju 88	Neubrandenburg, Germany	P-51 Mustang	487 FS, 352 FG
May 19, 1944	1	Bf 109	Ludwigslust, Germany	P-51	487 FS, 352 FG
May 27, 1944	2	Bf 109	Strasbourg, France	P-51	487 FS, 352 FG
May 29, 1944	1; 1.5	Focke-Wulf Fw 190; Bf 109	Güstrow, Germany; Wolgast, Germany	P-51	487 FS, 352 FG
May 30, 1944	1; 1	Fw 190; Bf 109	Uelzen, Germany	P-51	487 FS, 352 FG
June 12, 1944	1	Bf 109	Rennes, France	P-51	487 FS, 352 FG
June 21, 1944	1	Bf 109	Magdeburg, Germany	P-51	487 FS, 352 FG
June 25, 1944	1	Bf 109	Soissons, France	P-51	487 FS, 352 FG
August 5, 1944	1	Bf 109	Hamburg, Germany	P-51	487 FS, 352 FG

SOURCES: Air Force Historical Study 85: USAF Credits for the Destruction of Enemy Aircraft, World War II

== Awards and decorations ==
His awards include:

USAF Command Pilot Badge
Silver Star
Distinguished Flying Cross with silver oak leaf cluster
Air Medal with three bronze oak leaf clusters
Air Force Presidential Unit Citation
Army Good Conduct Medal
American Campaign Medal
European-African-Middle Eastern Campaign Medal with two bronze campaign stars
World War II Victory Medal
National Defense Service Medal
Armed Forces Reserve Medal with silver hourglass device
Air Force Longevity Service Award

=== Silver Star citation ===
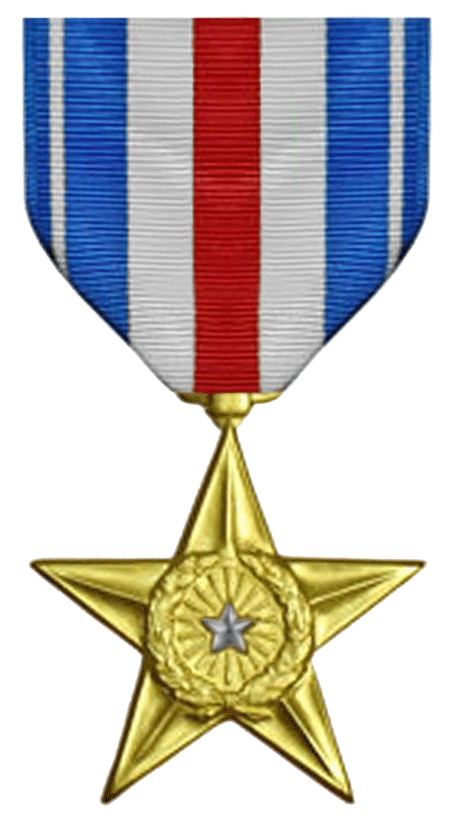

Moran, Glennon T.
First Lieutenant (Air Corps), U.S. Army Air Forces
487th Fighter Squadron, 352nd Fighter Group, Eighth Air Force
Date of Action: May 30, 1944

Citation:

The President of the United States of America, authorized by Act of Congress July 9, 1918, takes pleasure in presenting the Silver Star to First Lieutenant (Air Corps) Glennon Timothy Moran, United States Army Air Forces, for gallantry in action against the enemy while serving as Pilot of a P-51 Fighter Airplane of the 487th Fighter Squadron, 352d Fighter Group, Eighth Air Force, while escorting bombers on a mission over Germany, on 30 May 1944. Lieutenant Moran was a member of a flight of three P-51 fighters which made an attack on approximately twenty (20) FW-190's. In the ensuing action against great odds, he exhibited superior combat tactics in out-maneuvering the enemy, destroying one FW-190 and damaging another. The hostile fighters were dispersed and their attack on the bombers completely frustrated. Following this engagement, Lieutenant Moran observed a ME-109 approaching an airdrome to land. Though subjected to intense fire from ground defenses, he fearlessly attacked and destroyed the enemy aircraft. The courage, aggressive combat spirit and exceptional skill displayed by Lieutenant Moran contributed in a large measure to the safety of the bomber formation.
