= John F. Thornell Jr. =

American fighter ace

John Francis Thornell Jr
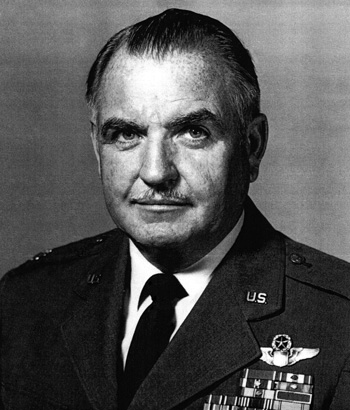
- Lt Col. John Francis Thornell, Jr
- Born: April 19, 1921; Stoughton, Massachusetts, U.S.
- Died: September 3, 1998 (aged 77); Green Valley, Arizona, U.S.
- Burial place: Riverside National Cemetery
- Military career
- Allegiance: United States
- Branch: United States Air Force
- Service years: 1940–1971
- Rank: Lieutenant Colonel
- Nickname: Jack
- Units: 328th Fighter Squadron, 352nd Fighter Group
- Commands: 3526th Pilot Training Squadron
- Conflicts: World War II
- Awards: Distinguished Service Cross; Silver Star (2); Distinguished Flying Cross (6); Meritorious Service Medal; Air Medal (6)

John Francis Thornell Jr. (April 19, 1921 – September 3, 1998) was a career officer in the United States Air Force and a World War II flying ace. He flew P-51 Mustangs and P-47 Thunderbolts with the 328th Fighter Squadron of the 352nd Fighter Group. He was the third highest scoring ace of 352nd Fighter Group, and one of the top USAAF aces of the European Theater of Operations and Eighth Air Force, with 17.25 aerial victories and 3 ground victories.

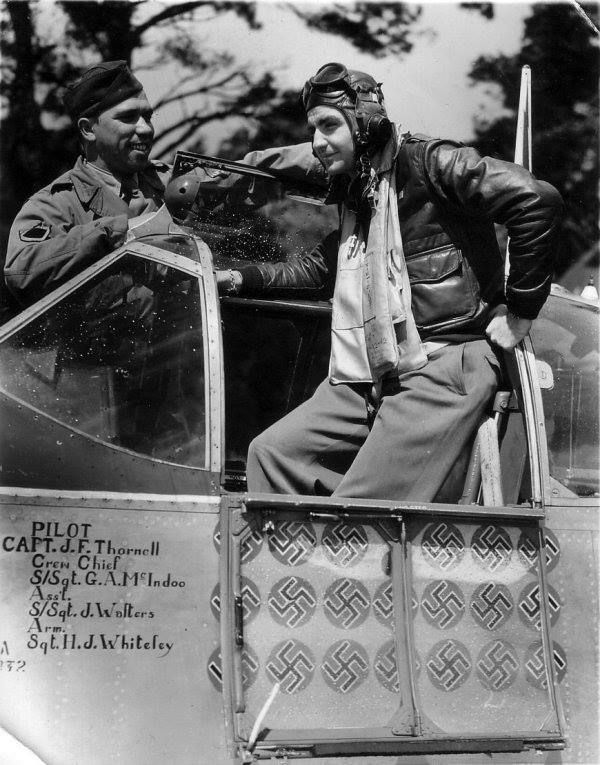
Capt John F Thornell Jr. stands in the cockpit of North American P-51B Mustang “Pattie Ann II” with his crew chief.

== Early life ==
Thornell was born in Stoughton, Massachusetts on April 19, 1921. After moving to East Walpole in 1933, he graduated from the Norfolk County Agricultural School in May 1939.

== Military career ==
In July 1940, Thornell enlisted in the United States Army and was assigned to the 7th Field Artillery Regiment, 1st Infantry Division at Fort Ethan Allen, Vermont. Promoted to corporal, he was reassigned to the Air Corps in January 1942. He began training as an aviation cadet in March 1942 and was commissioned as a second lieutenant in February 1943 after completing flight training.

=== World War II ===
Following the completion of his flight training and subsequent training in the P-47 Thunderbolt, Thornell was assigned to the 328th Fighter Squadron of the 352nd Fighter Group at RAF Bodney, England in the European Theater of Operations, in July 1943. Flying the P-47, he shot down a Messerschmitt Bf 109 over Germany on January 30, 1944, his first aerial victory. He shot down two Bf 109s over the Netherlands in March 1944, his second and third aerial victories. Thornell shot down one Focke-Wulf Fw 190 on April 10, 1944 and on the same month, the 352d FG converted to North American P-51 Mustangs. On April 19, during a bomber escort mission over Northeim, Germany, Thornell's flight encountered a formation of 20 to 30 Fw 190s attempting to attack bomber formation. Intercepting the enemy fighter formation, Thornell shot down two Fw 190s, bringing his total to six aerial victories, and earned the title of flying ace and his first Silver Star.

On May 8, Thornell was part of 16 352nd FG P-51s formation escorting B-17 Flying Fortress and B-24 Liberators targeting Brunswick, Germany. While leading 'Blue flight' of the formation near Nienburg, Germany, the flight encountered four Bf 109s attempting to attack the bombers. Thornell shot at the Bf 109s, leading them to be separated and preventing their attack on the bombers. Joining with 487th Fighter Squadron commander John C. Meyer, they then spotted three Bf 109s heading towards the bombers and Thornell shot down two of the Bf 109s. After getting separated from Meyer, Thornell outmaneuvered a Bf 109 that was attacking him and the pilot bailed out before Thornell could shoot at the Bf 109. Credited with destroying three Bf 109s in the mission, Thornell along with four other pilots received Distinguished Service Cross for their heroism in the mission and the 352nd FG received the Distinguished Unit Citation.

Thornell downed two Bf 109s on May 27, 1944, one on May 28 and two on May 29. On June 10, during Operation Overlord, Thornell was leading a flight of four P-51s on an aerial patrol between Saint-Lô and Caen, France when they noticed 30 Bf 109s, attached with 200-kilogram bombs, preparing for a ground attack on the 1st Canadian Infantry Division in Caen. Thornell led the attack on the Bf 109s and shot down two of them, leading the German formation to break up and depart away. He was subsequently awarded a second Silver Star for actions during the mission.

During World War II, Thornell was credited with the destruction of 17.25 enemy aircraft in aerial combat plus 2 damaged, and 3 destroyed on the ground while strafing enemy airfields. During his time with the 352nd FG, he flew P-51B bearing the name 'Patty Ann'.

=== Post-war ===
After the war, Thornell transferred to the new Air Force in 1947. From 1949 to 1951, he served as a fighter tactics advisor for the Turkish Air Force. From 1955 to 1956, Thornell attended the University of Southern California. In 1956, he was assigned to Atomic Plans Office headquarters of the Third Air Force in England, and maintained combat status in the F-84 Thunderjet and F-100 Super Sabre with 20th Fighter Wing at RAF Wethersfield, England. From 1960 to 1964, he was assigned to Williams Air Force Base, Arizona, where he commanded the 3526th Flying Training Squadron. In July 1967, he was assigned to Norton Air Force Base, California where he served as the Chief of the Fighter Branch with the Inspector General Group, his final position before he retired from active duty as a lieutenant colonel on August 1, 1971.

== Later life and death ==
On March 3, 1945, Thornell married Pamela McLendon. They had six boys and two girls and lived in Green Valley, Arizona after his retirement. Thornell's younger brother Edmund was an Air Force pilot during the Vietnam War and was killed in action on September 10, 1966.

After his death on September 3, 1998, Thornell was interred beside his wife at Riverside National Cemetery five days later.

== Aerial victory credits ==
Chronicle of aerial victories
Date	#	Type	Location	Aircraft flown	Unit Assigned
January 30, 1944	1	Messerschmitt Bf 109	Twist, Germany	P-47D Thunderbolt	328 FS, 352 FG
March 15, 1944	2	Bf 109	Heusden, Netherlands	P-47D	328 FS, 352 FG
March 22, 1944	0.25	Focke-Wulf Fw 200	Hesepe, Germany	P-47D	328 FS, 352 FG
April 10, 1944	1	Focke-Wulf Fw 190	Dormans, France	P-47D	328 FS, 352 FG
April 19, 1944	2	Fw 190	Brunswick, Germany	P-51B Mustang	328 FS, 352 FG
May 8, 1944	3	Bf 109	Nienburg, Germany	P-51B	328 FS, 352 FG
May 27, 1944	2	Bf 109	Strasbourg, France	P-51B	328 FS, 352 FG
May 28, 1944	1	Bf 109	Magdeburg, Germany	P-51B	328 FS, 352 FG
May 29, 1944	2	Bf 109	Neubrandenburg, Germany	P-51B	328 FS, 352 FG
June 10, 1944	2	Bf 109	Bayeux, France	P-51B	328 FS, 352 FG
June 12, 1944	0.5	Bf 109	Saint-Malo, France	P-51B	328 FS, 352 FG
June 21, 1944	0.5	Bf 109	Dahmsdorf, Germany	P-51B	328 FS, 352 FG

SOURCES: Air Force Historical Study 85: USAF Credits for the Destruction of Enemy Aircraft, World War II

== Awards and decorations ==
His awards include:

USAF Command pilot badge
Distinguished Service Cross
Silver Star with bronze oak leaf cluster
Distinguished Flying Cross with silver oak leaf cluster
Meritorious Service Medal
Air Medal with silver oak leaf cluster
Air Force Commendation Medal with bronze oak leaf cluster
Air Force Presidential Unit Citation
Air Force Outstanding Unit Award
Army Good Conduct Medal
American Defense Service Medal
American Campaign Medal
European-African-Middle Eastern Campaign Medal with two bronze campaign stars
World War II Victory Medal
Army of Occupation Medal with 'Germany' clasp
National Defense Service Medal with service star
Air Force Longevity Service Award with silver and bronze oak leaf clusters

=== Distinguished Service Cross citation ===
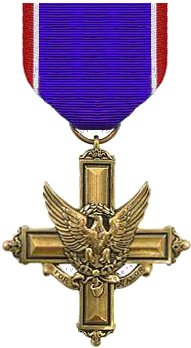

Citation:

The President of the United States of America, authorized by Act of Congress, July 9, 1918, takes pleasure in presenting the Distinguished Service Cross to First Lieutenant (Air Corps) John Francis Thornell, Jr., United States Army Air Forces, for extraordinary heroism in connection with military operations against an armed enemy while serving as Pilot of a P-51 Fighter Airplane in the 328th Fighter Squadron, 352d Fighter Group, Eighth Air Force, in aerial combat against enemy forces on 8 May 1944, in the European Theater of Operations. On this date, Lieutenant Thornell, with complete disregard for the odds against him, led a flight against a vastly superior force of enemy fighters in the vicinity of Nienburg, Germany, and dispersed the enemy attempting to intercept a friendly bomber formation. Determined to destroy the enemy, accompanied by two other friendly fighters he attacked three enemy fighters and by courageous flying and skillful gunnery destroyed two of them. Later, Lieutenant Thornell was attacked by a lone enemy fighter whom he outmaneuvered and destroyed, bringing his total for the day to three enemy airplanes destroyed. The outstanding courage, coolness, and skill displayed by Lieutenant Thornell upon this occasion reflect highest credit upon himself and the Armed Forces of the United States.
