= Joe L. Mason =

Colonel in the United States Air Force

Joseph Lennard Mason
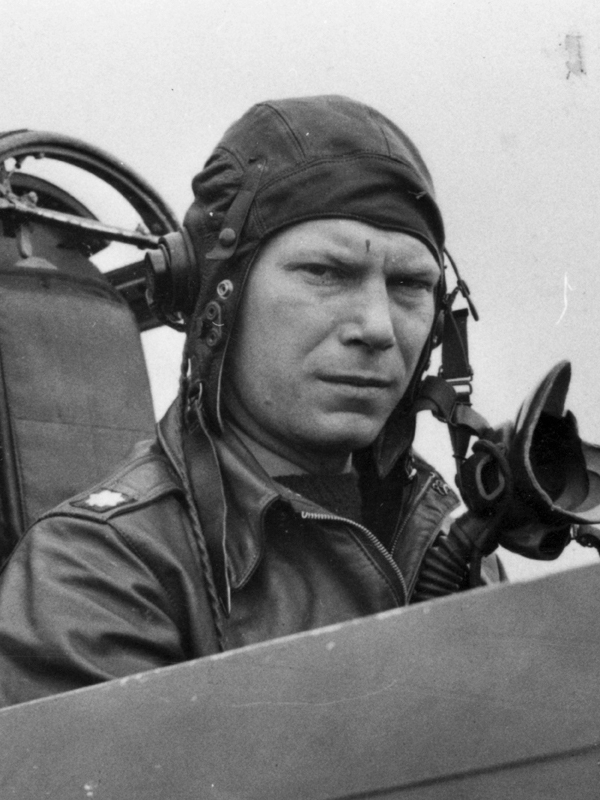
- Lt. Col. Joe L. Mason in 1944
- Born: April 10, 1915; Washington D.C., U.S.
- Died: June 18, 1974 (aged 59); Bexar County, Texas, U.S.
- Burial place: Fort Sam Houston National Cemetery
- Military career
- Allegiance: United States of America
- Branch: United States Army Air Corps; United States Army Air Forces; United States Air Force
- Service years: 1937-1967
- Rank: Colonel
- Nickname: "Joe"
- Units: 352nd Fighter Group; 49th Fighter-Bomber Wing
- Commands: 59th Fighter Squadron; Squadron, 324th Fighter Group; 352nd Fighter Group; Oscoda Field; Millville Field; 3595th Pilot Training Wing; 49th Fighter-Bomber Wing; Civil Air Patrol
- Conflicts: World War II; Korean War
- Awards: Distinguished Service Cross; Silver Star; Legion of Merit; Distinguished Flying Cross (3); Air Medal (6)

Joseph Lennard Mason (April 10, 1915 – June 18, 1974) was a colonel in the United States Air Force. He commanded the 352nd Fighter Group during World War II and was a fighter ace. He later commanded the 3595th Pilot Training Wing and the 49th Fighter-Bomber Wing during the Korean War.

== Early life ==
Mason was born on April 10, 1915, in Washington, D.C.

== Military career ==
He enlisted in the U.S. Army Air Corps' Flying Cadet Program on October 1, 1937. He was commissioned as a second lieutenant and received his pilot wings at Kelly Field in Texas, on October 5, 1938.

After receiving his pilot wings, Mason was stationed at Mitchel Field in New York, where he flew bombers from October 1938 to October 1939. He served in the reserves until April 29, 1940, when he was assigned to 35th Pursuit Squadron of the 8th Pursuit Group in Langley Field in Virginia, where he flew the Curtiss P-40 Warhawk.

In June 1941, Mason was appointed as commander of the 9th Fighter Squadron of the 33rd Fighter Group in Mitchell Field and in July 1942, he was assigned to the 324th Fighter Group in Philadelphia, where he served as a squadron commander and operations officer.

=== World War II ===
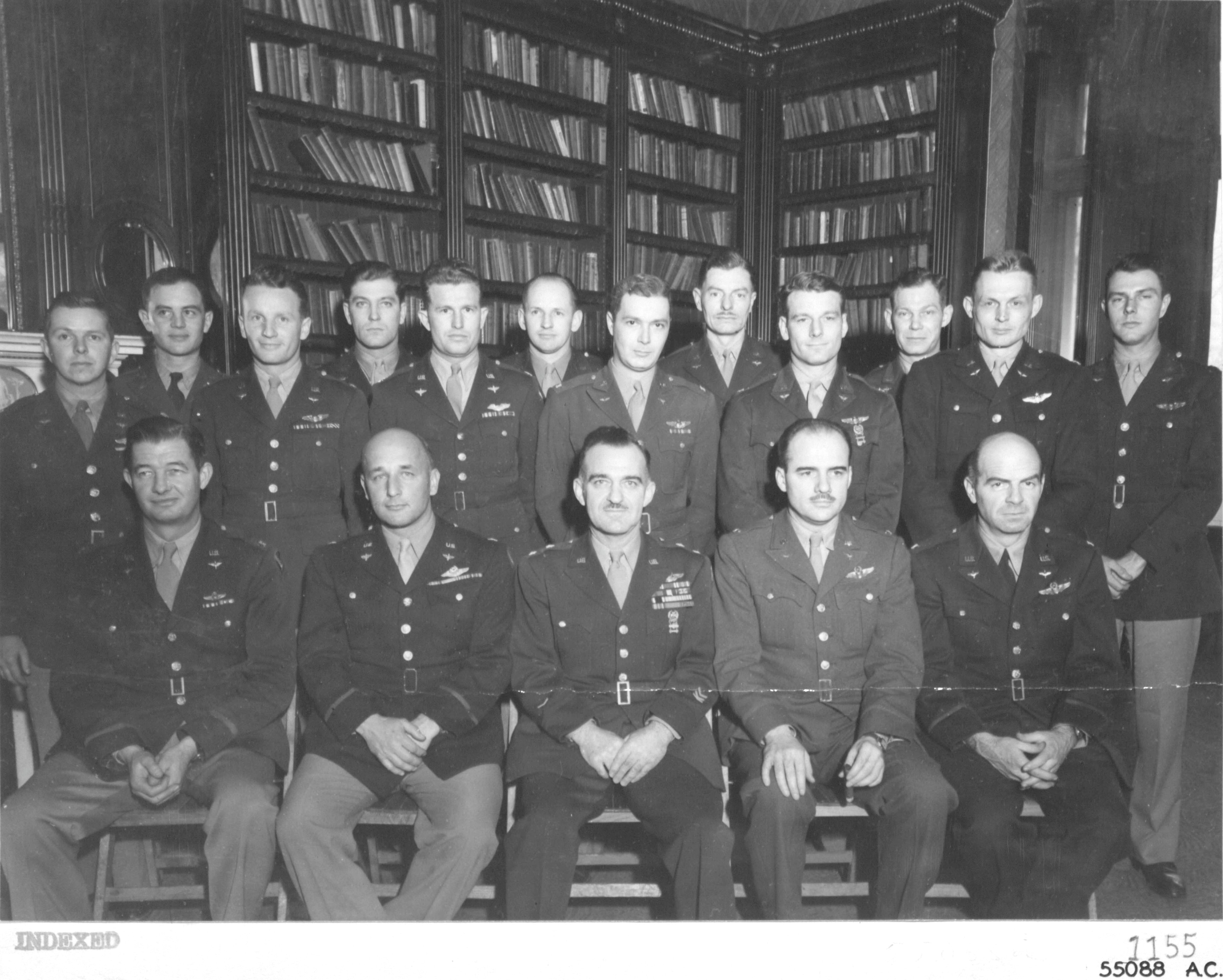
Commanding officers of the fighter groups of the 8th Air Force in 1944; Mason is third from the right standing.

In May 1943, he was assigned as commander of the 352nd Fighter Group at Mitchell Field, which was equipped with the P-47 Thunderbolts. In June 1943, the group landed in the United Kingdom, and was assigned to RAF Bodney in Watton, Norfolk, under the operational control of the 67th Fighter Wing, VIII Fighter Command.

Flying P-47s, Mason shot down a Messerschmitt Bf 109 on February 24, 1944, his first aerial victory. In April 1944, the 352nd FG converted from P-47 to P-51 Mustang and he scored his second aerial victory on May 8, in an action for which he received the Distinguished Service Cross. His biggest day came on May 13, when he shot down two Bf 109s and one Focke-Wulf Fw 190 during a bomber escort, for which he earned the title of flying ace.

During World War II, Mason was credited with the destruction of 5 enemy aircraft and 2 damaged while flying 78 combat missions over Europe. While serving with the 352 FG, he flew P-47 and P-51s bearing the name "This Is It".

Mason returned to the United States in November 1944 and was assigned commander of Oscoda Field in Michigan. In February 1945, he was appointed as deputy commander of Selfridge Field in Michigan.

=== Post war ===
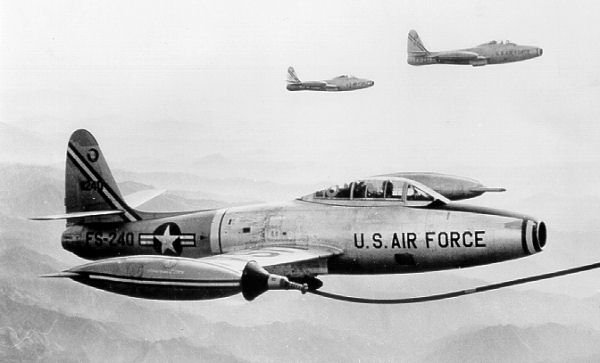
49th FBG F-84s over Korea

After the end of World War II, Mason served as commander of Millville Field in New Jersey, until January 1946. From February 1946 to June 1947, he served in air and base staff at airfields in New York and Texas. After graduating from Air Command & Staff College in June 1948, he was assigned to the Flying Division of Air Training Command at Randolph Air Force Base in Texas.

In March 1949, he was assigned as commanding officer of the 3595th Pilot Training Wing at Las Vegas Air Force Base in Nevada. He attended Air War College from January to June 1951.

During the Korean War, Mason served as deputy commander and then commander of the 49th Fighter-Bomber Wing at Taegu Air Base in South Korea, and flew 18 missions in the F-84 Thunderjet from July 1951 to July 1952.

From June 1958 to June 1962, he was assigned to the Pentagon where he served several tours with Headquarters U.S. Air Force and was stationed in England.

On 1964, he was appointed as commander of the Civil Air Patrol, a final position which he served until his retirement from the Air Force on June 1, 1967.

== Later life ==
Mason died on June 18, 1974, at the age of 59. He was buried at Fort Sam Houston National Cemetery on June 21.

== Summary of enemy aircraft damaged/destroyed ==
Date	Location	Air/Ground	Number	Type	Status
24 February 1944	Osnabrück, Germany	Air	1	Bf 109	Destroyed
8 May 1944	Nienburg, Germany	Air	1	Fw 190	Destroyed
8 May 1944	Nienburg, Germany	Air	1	Fw 190	Damaged
13 May 1944	Demmin and Friedland, Germany	Air	1	Bf 109	Damaged
13 May 1944	Demmin and Friedland, Germany	Air	2	Bf 109	Destroyed
13 May 1944	Demmin and Friedland, Germany	Air	1	Fw 190	Destroyed

All information on enemy aircraft damaged and destroyed is from Stars and Bars.

== Awards and decorations ==
His awards include:

USAF Command pilot badge
Distinguished Service Cross
Silver Star
Legion of Merit
Distinguished Flying Cross with two bronze oak leaf clusters
Air Medal with silver oak leaf cluster
Air Force Commendation Medal
Army Commendation Medal
Air Force Presidential Unit Citation
American Defense Service Medal
American Campaign Medal
European-African-Middle Eastern Campaign Medal with four bronze campaign stars
World War II Victory Medal
National Defense Service Medal with service star
Korean Service Medal with two bronze campaign stars
Air Force Longevity Service Award with silver and bronze oak leaf clusters
Small Arms Expert Marksmanship Ribbon
Distinguished Flying Cross (United Kingdom)
Croix de Guerre with Palm (France)
Republic of Korea Presidential Unit Citation
United Nations Service Medal for Korea
Korean War Service Medal

=== Distinguished Service Cross citation ===

Mason, Joe Lennard
Colonel, U.S. Army Air Forces
352d Fighter Group, 8th Air Force
Date of Action: May 8, 1944

Citation:

The President of the United States of America, authorized by Act of Congress July 9, 1918, takes pleasure in presenting the Distinguished Service Cross to Colonel (Air Corps) Joe Lennard Mason, United States Army Air Forces, for extraordinary heroism in action with the enemy while serving as Pilot of a P-51 Fighter Airplane in the 352d Fighter Group, Eighth Air Force, on 8 May 1944. On this date, Colonel Mason with his wingman, without regard to the great odds against them, engaged and dispersed thirty-five or more enemy planes attacking a friendly bomber formation. During this encounter, Colonel Mason and one of his wingmen became separated from their Group. At this time fifteen more enemy planes appeared, and Colonel Mason unhesitatingly attacked, and although only one gun was operating, he destroyed an enemy plane with the last of his ammunition. Proceeding homeward, Colonel Mason observed a large number of enemy fighters threatening a bomber formation. Although completely out of ammunition, he attacked head-on, and broke up the threat. The heroism and devotion to duty displayed by Colonel Mason upon this occasion reflect highest credit upon himself and the Armed Forces of the United States.
