= John Thornell =

John Thornell may refer to:

- John F. Thornell Jr., United States Air Force officer and World War II flying ace
- John Thornell (athlete), Australian long jumper
