= 352nd Fighter Group =

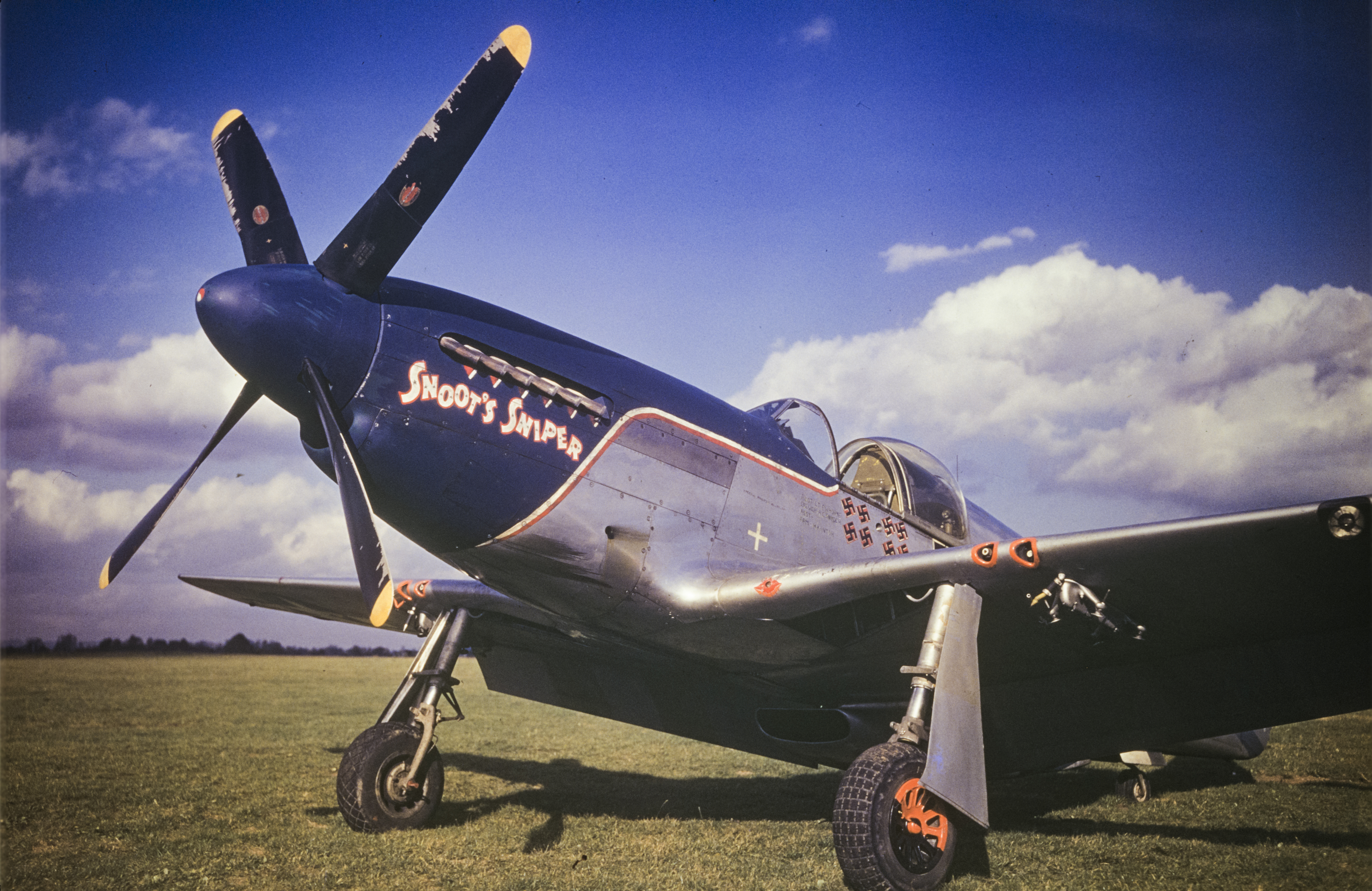
- P-51 Mustang of the 352nd Fighter Group
- Active: 29 September 1942
- Disbanded: 10 November 1945
- Country: United States
- Branch: United States Army Air Forces
- Garrison/HQ: RAF Bodney
- Nickname: Blue-nosed Bastards of Bodney
- Mottos: Custodes Pro Defensione; Guardians for Defense
- Engagements: Air Offensive, Europe; Normandy; Northern France; Rhineland; Battle of the Bulge; Invasion of Germany
- Decorations: Distinguished Unit Citation; French Croix de Guerre with Palm

Aircraft flown
- Fighter: P-47 Thunderbolt; P-51 Mustang

The 352nd Fighter Group was a unit of the Eighth Air Force that was located in the European Theater of Operations during World War II. The unit served as bomber escort, counter-air patrols, and attacking ground targets. It initially flew P-47 Thunderbolt aircraft before converting to P-51 Mustang in April 1944. The group was located at RAF Bodney in England for the majority of its service and were nicknamed the Blue-nosed Bastards of Bodney due to the distinctive blue of the nose and upper cowl of the P-51 Mustangs of the group.

== Activation and training ==
The 352nd Fighter Group was constituted on 29 September 1942 and activated on 1 October 1942 with Lt. Col. Edwin M. Ramage in command. The unit served in the United States as part of the air defense force while training with P-47 Thunderbolt aircraft. The 352nd squadrons were the 328th the 486th and the 487th Fighter Squadrons.

The 352nd was stationed at Mitchel Field in New York in October 1942 and then moved to Bradley Field in Connecticut later that month. In November 1942, the group moved to Westover Field, Massachusetts, and then to Trumbull Field, Connecticut in January 1943. They moved to Republic Field, New York March–June 1943 before moving to England in June and July 1943.

The group was assigned to I Fighter Command from October 1942 – June 1943 and attached to the New York Fighter Wing in October–November 1942 and March–June 1943 and to the Boston Fighter Wing, November–March 1943.

== European theatre of World War II ==
=== RAF Bodney ===
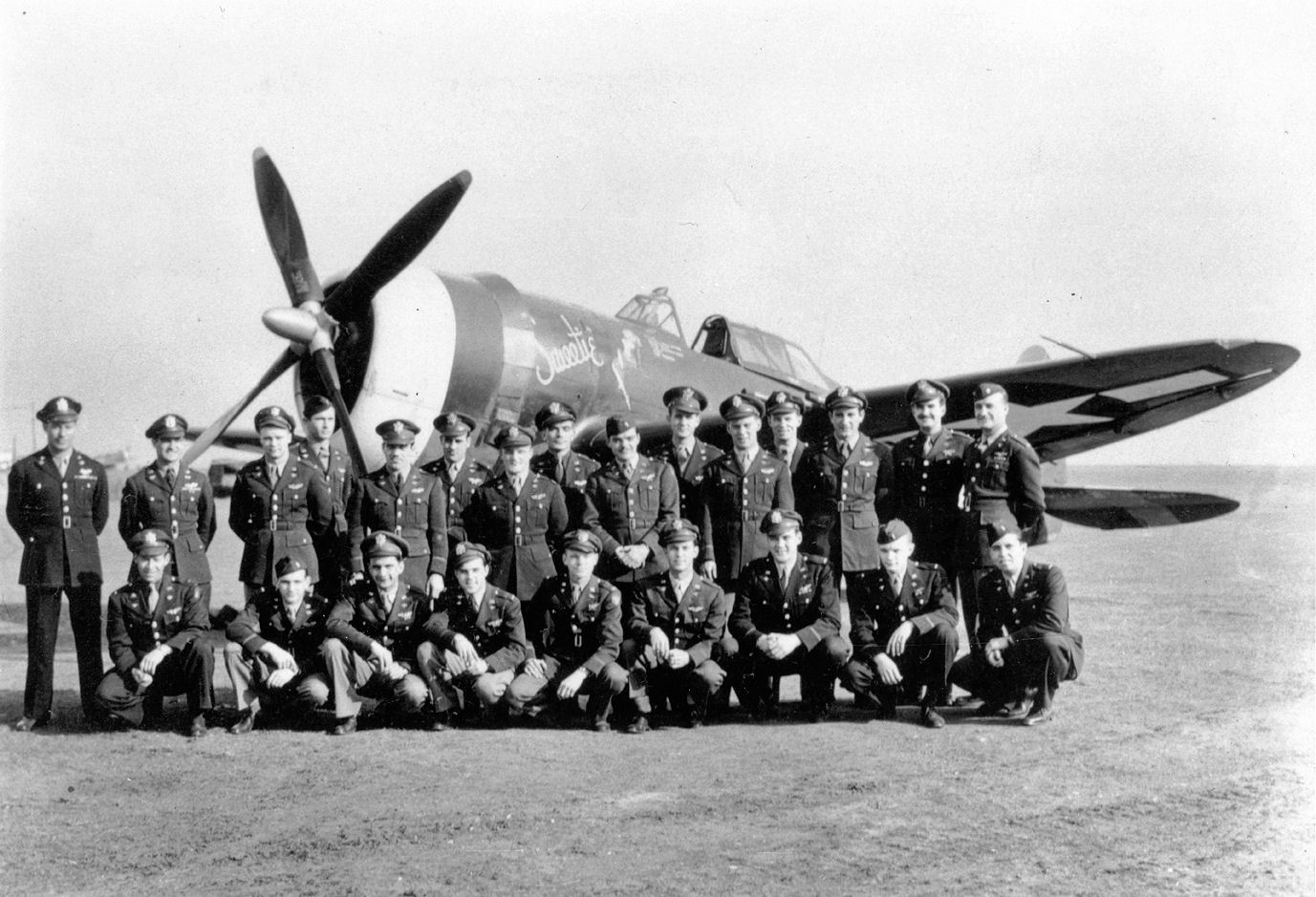
Pilots of the 486th Fighter Squadron, 352nd Fighter Group, in front of a P-47 Thunderbolt at RAF Bodney in March 1944

The 352nd Fighter Group moved to RAF Bodney in Norfolk England on 5 July 1943 and was assigned to Eighth Air Force, VIII Fighter Command. Col Joseph L. Mason assumed command on 17 May 1943 and held that position for most of the group's time overseas. The group flew bomber escort missions, counter-air patrols, attacks on airfields, trains, vehicles, troops, gun positions, and other targets. The group was assigned to the 67th Fighter Wing in October 1943, attached to the 1st Bombardment Division in September 1944 and further attached to IX Tactical Air Command in December 1944.

The 352nd escorted bombers during the Big Week operation of 20 to 25 February 1944. The goal of Big Week was to lure the Luftwaffe into a battle by attacking the German aircraft industry.

In April 1944, the group converted from P-47 Thunderbolt to P-51 Mustang aircraft.

The 352nd received a Distinguished Unit Citation for performance during an escort mission to Brunswick Germany on 8 May 1944. While escorting bombers to Brunswick, the group fought off an attack by a numerically superior force of German fighters. The group battled enemy planes until they were forced to withdraw and return to its base due to lack of ammunition and fuel.

=== Invasion of Normandy ===
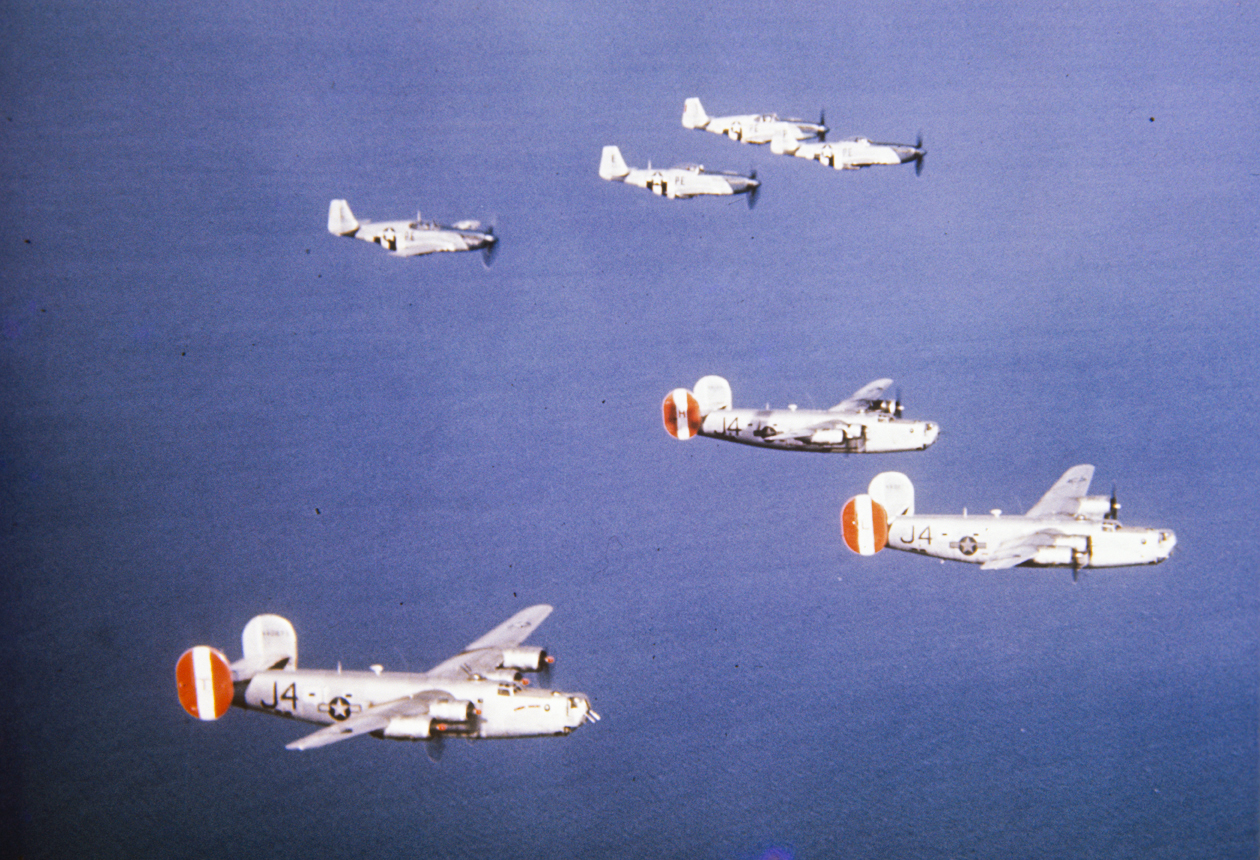
P-51 Mustangs of the 352nd Fighter Group escorting B-24 Liberator bombers of the 458th Bombardment Group over the North Sea

The 352nd Fighter Group participated in the invasion of Normandy in June 1944 with missions to strafing the beaches and other positions and dive-bomb enemy communications. In July 1944, the group supported the allied breakthrough in the Battle of Saint-Lô and in September 1944 supported Operation Market Garden in the Netherlands.

Col. James D. Mayden became commanding officer on 17 Nov 1944 and would serve as CO through VE Day.

=== Battle of the Bulge ===
During the Battle of the Bulge, a detachment of the 352nd was sent to Asch Airfield in Belgium and placed under the control of the Ninth Air Force.

The group received the French Croix de Guerre with Palm for actions on 1 January 1945 during the German Operation Bodenplatte. The goal of Bodenplatte was to gain air superiority during a stagnant stage of the Battle of the Bulge so that the German forces could resume their advance. On that day, the 487th squadron, John C. Meyer anticipated the attack and had a flight of 12 planes ready to take off when the attack began. As the planes were readying for takeoff, the airfield was attacked by about 50 fighters from Jagdgeschwader 11 and the 487th planes took off under fire. In the ensuing battle, the 352nd shot down almost half the enemy planes without any losses.

=== Belgium ===
In February 1945, the remainder of the 352nd moved to Belgium and, with the 361st Fighter Group, became the first fighter groups to move to the European continent. the remainder of the group joined the detachment in Belgium for operations under the control of Eighth AF. The 352nd supported the Operation Varsity airborne assault across the Rhine in March 1945.

The group returned to RAF Bodney in April 1945 and operated there until V-E Day on 8 May.

== Post war ==
The 352nd Fighter Group returned to Camp Kilmer, New Jersey in November 1945. On 24 May 1946, it was redesignated the 113th Fighter Group and allocated to the District of Columbia Air National Guard with the exception of the 328th Fighter Squadron which was allocated to the Virginia National Guard .

== Aces ==
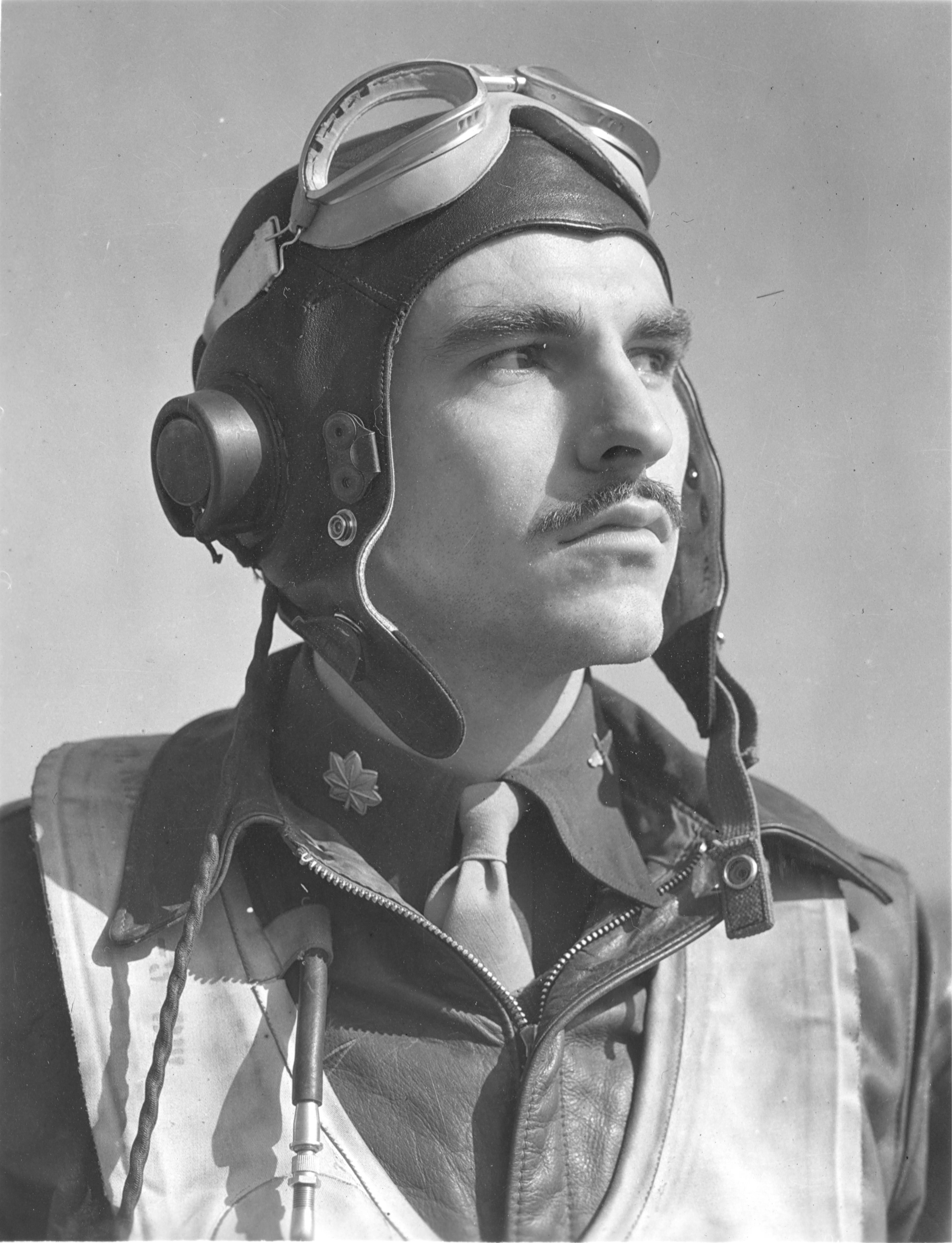
Top P-51 ace George Preddy in 1944

The 352nd Fighter Group had 27 fighter aces, including Major George Preddy, Col. John C. Meyer, Lt. Col. William T. Halton, Capt. John Thornell, Capt. Donald S. Bryan, Capt. Glennon T. Moran, Capt. Raymond H. Littge and Capt. William T. Whisner. Preddy was the leading P-51 ace and commanded the 328th Fighter Squadron of the 352nd.

== Bibliography ==
- Robert H. Powell (2010). Bluenoser Tales: 352nd Fighter Group War Stories. Powell Pub.
