= Zutendaal Air Base =

Air Base in Zutendaal, Belgium

Zutendaal Air Base (Advanced Landing Ground Y-29)
- IATA: none; ICAO: EBSL

Summary
- Location: Zutendaal, Belgium
- Built: 1917
- Elevation AMSL: 312 ft (95 m)
- Coordinates: 50°56′51″N 005°35′26″E

Map
- Location in Belgium

Runways
Direction	Length		Surface
Direction	m	ft	Surface
06/24	799	2,621	Asphalt/Concrete
- Sources: Belgian AIP

Zutendaal Air Base (ICAO: EBSL) is a reserve Belgian Air Force base, located 6.4 km (4 miles) east-southeast of Genk (Limburg), approximately 80 km (50 miles) east-northeast of Brussels.

== Overview ==
The base is in reserve status, its primary use being to store retired Agusta helicopters. Since 2009, it has been open to limited civilian recreational flying; it is home to a gliding club, operating on the weekends.

== History ==
=== Origins ===
Zutendaal Air Base's origins date to March 1917 when it was originally constructed by the German Army Air Corps as "Flieger Schießschule". it was established for observers destined for artillery units. Near this airfield, the Germans selected a large heath area (between Houthalen, Genk, As, Peer and Opglabbeek) where they installed a firing range.

After World War I, the name of the airfield was changed to Asch (as it was spelled at the time) and it became the Flying School of the Belgian Military Aviation, later in March 1920 called Aéronautique Militaire. Situated 2 km SW of the town centre of As, this school had a large 1100 by 800 metres grass airfield at its disposal and several metal hangars and brick support buildings. After the Flying School was abandoned in 1924, the airfield was closed to make room for the proposed construction of a canal, and moved to Wevelgem, the field gradually became a dense wooded area.

=== World War II ===
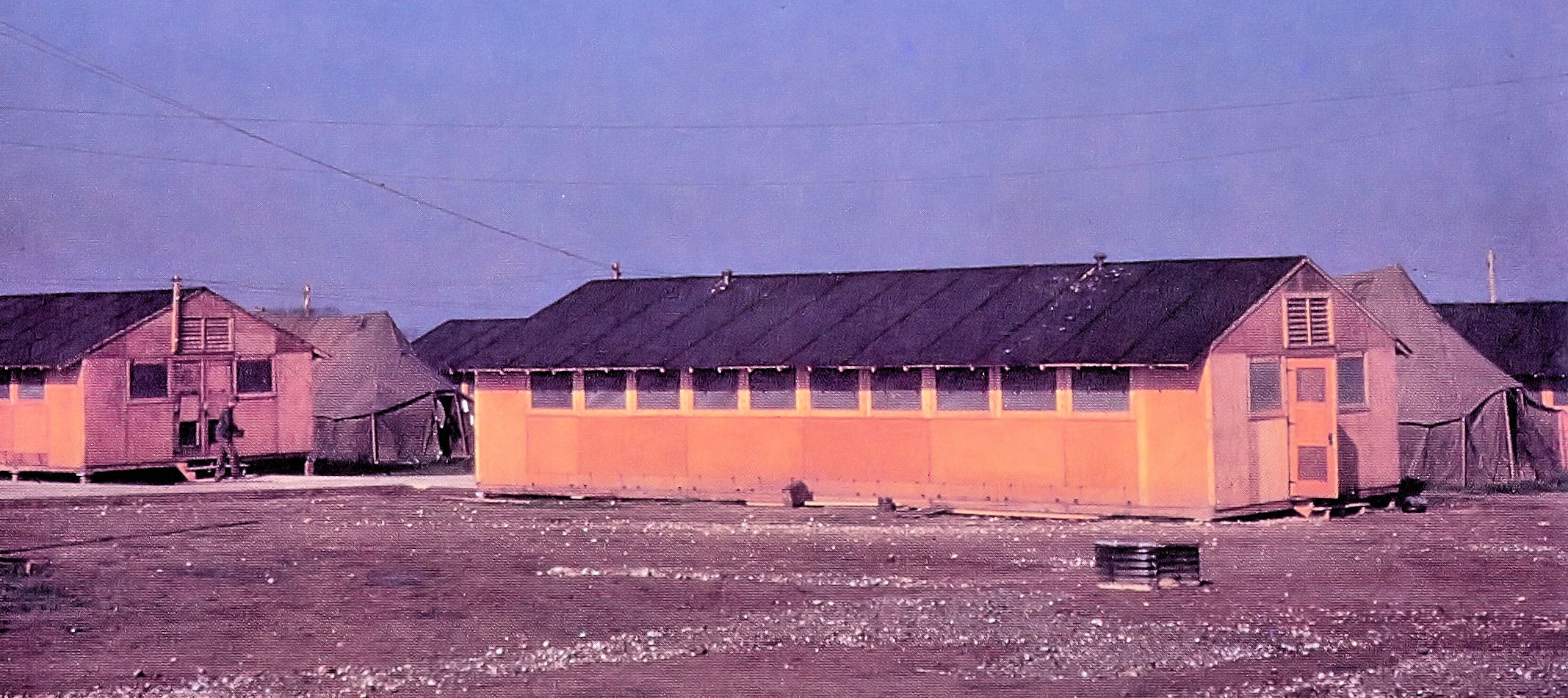
Temporary USAAF Buildings at Asch Airfield (Y-29) Belgium 1945

In November 1944 a new airfield near the World War I aerodrome was constructed by the United States Army Air Forces IX Engineer Command, 852nd and 846th Engineer Aviation Battalions. Known as Advanced Landing Ground "Y-29", the airfield consisted of a single 5000 foot (1500m) Sod runway aligned 06/24. In addition, tents were erected for billeting and also for support facilities; an access road was built to the existing road infrastructure; a dump was created for supplies, ammunition, and gasoline drums, along with a drinkable water; and a minimal electrical grid for communications and station lighting was installed.

Asch was home to North American P-51 Mustangs of the 352nd Fighter Group, Eighth Air Force (which included the 328th Fighter Squadron, led by George Preddy); and Republic P-47 Thunderbolts from 366th Fighter Group, Ninth Air Force, from 19 November 1944 – 11 April 1945. The 406th Fighter Group, also flew from the airfield in P-47s from 8 February – 15 April 1945. The fighter planes flew support missions, patrolling roads in front of the beachhead; strafing German military vehicles and dropping bombs on gun emplacements, anti-aircraft artillery and concentrations of German troops when spotted.

On January 1, 1945, Asch airfield was the site of a major aerial battle during the Luftwaffe's Operation Bodenplatte. The Focke-Wulf Fw 190s and Messerschmitt Bf 109s of Jagdgeschwader 11 (JG 11) arrived at Asch just as the 487th Fighter Squadron of the 352nd FG were rolling down the runway, the ensuing battle came to be known as the Legend of Y-29 and encapsulated the failure of Operation Bodenplatte as a whole. The pilots of the 487th FS who took off did so under fire and in the face of overwhelming odds. The 487th scored 23 kills while suffering only 2 damaged aircraft in the face of 3:1 odds. For their performance the 487th received the only Distinguished Unit Citation given to a fighter squadron in the European theatre.

When the fighter units moved out, the 391st Bombardment Group flew Martin B-26 Marauder medium bombers from the airfield until 27 May 1945. With the end of the war in Europe, the airfield was closed on 20 June 1945.

=== Belgian Air Force ===
After the war, the airfield was taken over by the Belgian Air Force. It was later rebuilt into a permanent facility with hard surfaced runways and support buildings. Currently it is used by the Belgian Army as a storage depot.

== See also ==
- Advanced Landing Ground
- Operation Bodenplatte
