= 487th Fighter Squadron =

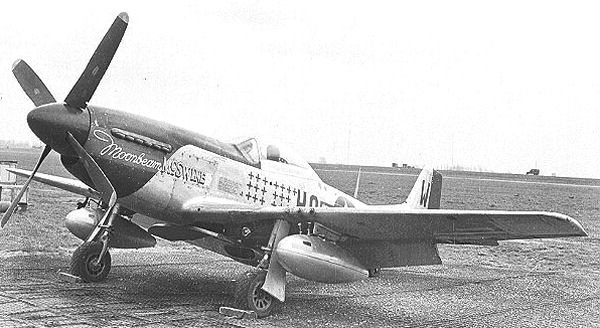
- Squadron P-51D Mustang (Note: Aircraft is North American P-51D-10-NA Mustang. serial 44-14237 "Moonbeam McSwine", flown by Capt William Whisner.)
- Active: 1942–1945
- Country: United States
- Branch: United States Army Air Forces
- Role: Fighter
- Engagements: European Theater of Operations
- Decorations: Distinguished Unit Citation; French Croix de Guerre with Palm

Commanders
- Notable commanders: John C. Meyer

Insignia
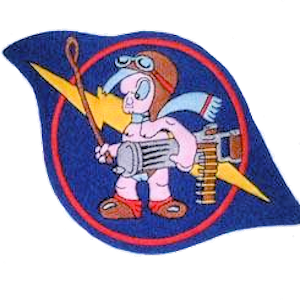
- 487th Fighter Squadron emblem (Note: Approved 14 July 1943.)
- Fuselage identification code: HO

The 487th Fighter Squadron is an inactive United States Air Force unit. It activated during World War II and was assigned to the 352nd Fighter Group of VIII Fighter Command. After training in the United States, it deployed to the European Theater of Operations, where it earned two Distinguished Unit Citations and a French Croix de Guerre with Palm for its combat actions. Following V-E Day, it returned to the United States and was inactivated at the port of embarkation, Camp Kilmer, New Jersey, on 9 November 1945.

== History ==
=== Formation and training in the United States ===
The Adjutant General directed the activation of the 352nd Fighter Group on 1 October 1942. Among its components was the 34th Fighter Squadron, formed by redesignating the 34th Pursuit Squadron as the 34th Fighter Squadron. The squadron began training under that designation. Just before the squadron shipped overseas, headquarters became aware that the 34th Pursuit Squadron, whose personnel were all in Japanese POW camps, was still being maintained on the rolls of the United States Army as an active unit: that there were two 34th Pursuit or Fighter Squadrons. As a result, the designation as the 34th Fighter Squadron was revoked and the squadron was retroactively activated as the 487th Fighter Squadron. However, because the original directive was revoked, the 34th Pursuit Squadron and the 487th Fighter Squadron are not related under U.S. Army lineage rules.

The squadron was activated at Mitchel Field, New York, although its formation occurred at Bradley Field, Connecticut. and it trained with Republic P-47 Thunderbolts at various bases in the northeast United States. While training, the squadron also served in the air defense of the northeast as part of the New York Fighter Wing. In mid-June 1943, the squadron moved to Camp Kilmer and sailed on the RMS Queen Elizabeth for England on 1 July.

=== Combat in the European Theater ===
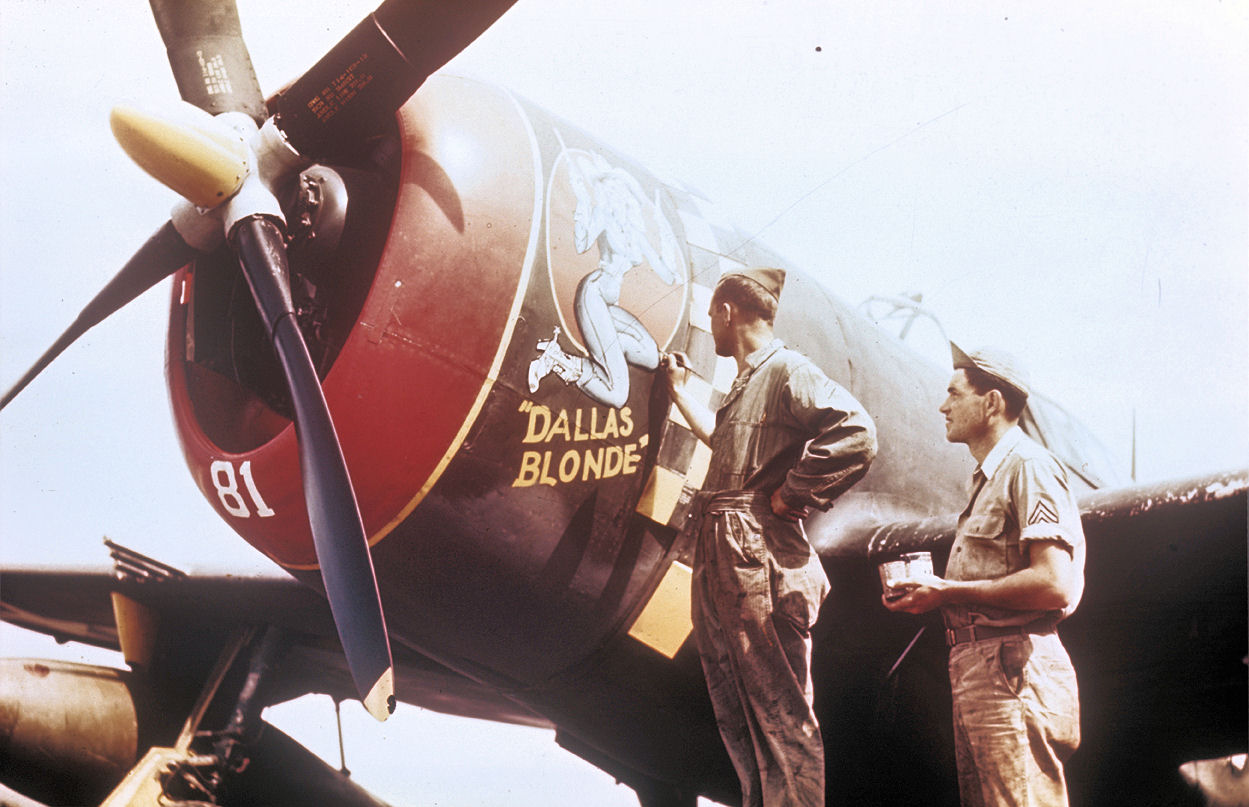
352d Fighter Group P-47 Thunderbolt "Dallas Blonde"

The squadron arrived at its combat station, RAF Bodney, in early July 1943. It flew its first combat mission on 9 September 1943. It concentrated on flying escort missions for VIII Bomber Command heavy bombers participating in the strategic bombing campaign against Germany. From 20 February to 25 February 1944, it flew cover for bombers involved in the Big Week campaign against the German aircraft manufacturing industry. Escort missions led to frequent encounters with enemy fighters, and three of the highest scoring aces in Eighth Air Force were squadron members. George E. Preddy was credited with 26.83 enemy aircraft destroyed in the air, John C. Meyer was credited with 24, and William T. Whisner with 15.5. (Note: Preddy was killed in action after transferring to command the group's 328th Fighter Squadron; Meyer remained in the Air Force and retired as a General and commander of Strategic Air Command; Whisner was also an ace in the Korean War and retired as a colonel. Freeman, pp. 273-274, 279-280)

In April 1944 the squadron began to replace its Thunderbolts with longer range North American P-51D Mustangs. On 8 May, the squadron was escorting bombers on a raid on Braunschweig. It routed an attack by a numerically superior force of German interceptors, continuing the fight until most planes had used all their ammunition and were running short on fuel, requiring the unit to return to base. For this action, the squadron was awarded the Distinguished Unit Citation. In addition to escort missions, the squadron flew counter air missions. Returning from its escort missions, it often engaged in air interdiction attacks.

As the German Army launched the counteroffensive known as the Battle of the Bulge, a detachment of the squadron that included all of its air echelon deployed to Asch Airfield on 23 December 1944 to reinforce Ninth Air Force flying air support missions. On 1 January the detachment earned the squadron the French Croix de Guerre with Palm, when its airfield was attacked by 50 Luftwaffe fighter aircraft, just as its planes were taking off for an area patrol. In the ensuing aerial battle, about half the attacking German aircraft were destroyed with no loss to the squadron. The squadron also earned its second Distinguished Unit Citation in this action for destroying 23 of the attackers. This was the only time during the war that a squadron in Eighth Air Force received this award independently of its group. The detachment moved to Chievres Airfield, Belgium in late January 1945, where it was joined by the rest of the squadron, coming under the control of Eighth Air Force again. From Chievres, it provided cover for Operation Varsity, the airborne assault to establish a bridgehead across the Rhine.

In April 1945, the squadron returned to England, flying its last mission on 3 May. It was credited with the destruction of 235 enemy aircraft in combat. Following V-E Day, many of the squadron personnel transferred for early return to the United States. The remaining personnel sailed on the RMS Queen Mary on 4 November 1945. After arriving in the United States, the squadron inactivated on 10 November 1945.

== Lineage ==
- Constituted as the 487th Fighter Squadron on 29 September 1942

Activated on 1 October 1942
Inactivated on 10 November 1945

=== Assignments ===
- 352d Fighter Group, 1 October 1942 – 10 November 1945

=== Stations ===
- Mitchel Field, New York, 1 October 1942
- Bradley Field, Connecticut, October 1942
- Westover Field, Massachusetts, November 1942
- Trumbull Field, Connecticut, c. 15 January 1943
- Mitchel Field, New York, c. 8 March – June 1943
- RAF Bodney (Sta 141), England, c. 7 July 1943 (detachment operated from Asch Airfield (Y-29), Belgium after 23 December 1944)
- Chievres Airfield (A-84), Belgium, 28 January 1945
- RAF Bodney (Sta 141), England, c. 14 April – 4 November 1945
- Camp Kilmer, New Jersey, 9–10 November 1945

=== Aircraft ===
- Republic P-47 Thunderbolt, 1942–1944
- North American P-51 Mustang, 1944–1945

=== Awards and campaigns ===
Award streamer	Award	Dates	Notes
	Distinguished Unit Citation	8 May 1944	Brunswick, Germany
	Distinguished Unit Citation	1 January 1945	Belgium
	French Croix de Guerre with Palm	1 January 1945	

Campaign Streamer	Campaign	Dates	Notes
	Air Offensive, Europe	7 July 1943 – 5 June 1944	
	Normandy	6 June 1944 – 24 July 1944	
	Northern France	25 July 1944 – 14 September 1944	
	Rhineland	15 September 1944 – 21 March 1945	
	Ardennes-Alsace	16 December 1944 – 25 January 1945	
	Central Europe	22 March 1944 – 21 May 1945	
	Air Combat, EAME Theater	7 July 1943 – 11 May 1945	
