= RAF Bodney =

Former RAF station in Norfolk, England

RAF Bodney USAAF Station 141
- Near Watton, Norfolk in England
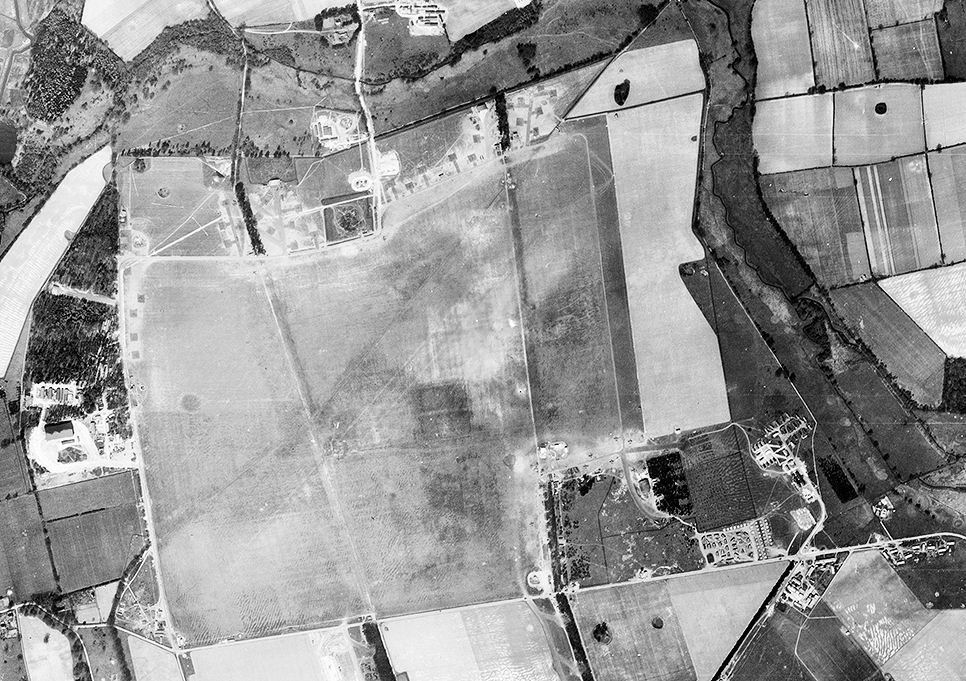
- Aerial photograph of Bodney airfield, looking north, 18 April 1944

Site information
- Type: Royal Air Force station
- Code: BO
- Owner: Air Ministry
- Operator: Royal Air Force; United States Army Air Forces
- Controlled by: RAF Bomber Command * No. 2 Group RAF (1940-1943); Eighth Air Force (1943-1945)

Location
- Shown within Norfolk RAF Bodney (the United Kingdom)
- Coordinates: 52°33′44″N 000°42′48″E

Site history
- Built: 1939-40
- In use: March 1940 - November 1945
- Battles/wars: European theatre of World War II

Airfield information
- Elevation: 149 feet (45 m) AMSL
Runways
Direction	Length and surface
00/00	Grass
00/00	Grass
00/00	Grass

Royal Air Force Bodney or more simply RAF Bodney is a former Royal Air Force station located 4.5 miles (7.2 km) west of Watton, Norfolk, England.

Originally built as an RAF Bomber Command airfield during 1939-1940, Bodney was transferred to the United States Army Air Forces in the summer of 1943. Placed under the jurisdiction of VIII Fighter Command of Eighth Air Force, it was primarily the home of the 352nd Fighter Group, the "Blue Nosed Bastards of Bodney". The unit briefly moved to Belgium in January 1945 due to the Battle of the Bulge, although it returned in April. It was closed after the 352nd returned to the United States in November.

== History ==
=== Royal Air Force use ===
Initially it was used by aircraft of No. 21 Squadron RAF and No. 82 Squadron RAF (No. 2 Group) Bomber Command. They carried operations over France and later the Netherlands and even Norway. Their Bristol Blenheim IVs were joined on occasions by, in May 1941, 90 Squadron evaluating its new Boeing Fortress Mk 1s some Handley Page Hampdens for mining operations. 90 Squadron suffered heavy casualties and the use of the Fortress I was discontinued. Towards October 1942, the Blenheims were changed to Lockheed Venturas but the squadron moved on to RAF Methwold before the Venturas were operational. Relief Landing Ground for No. 17 (Pilots) Advanced Flying Unit RAF between January 1942 and May 1943.

=== United States Army Air Forces use ===
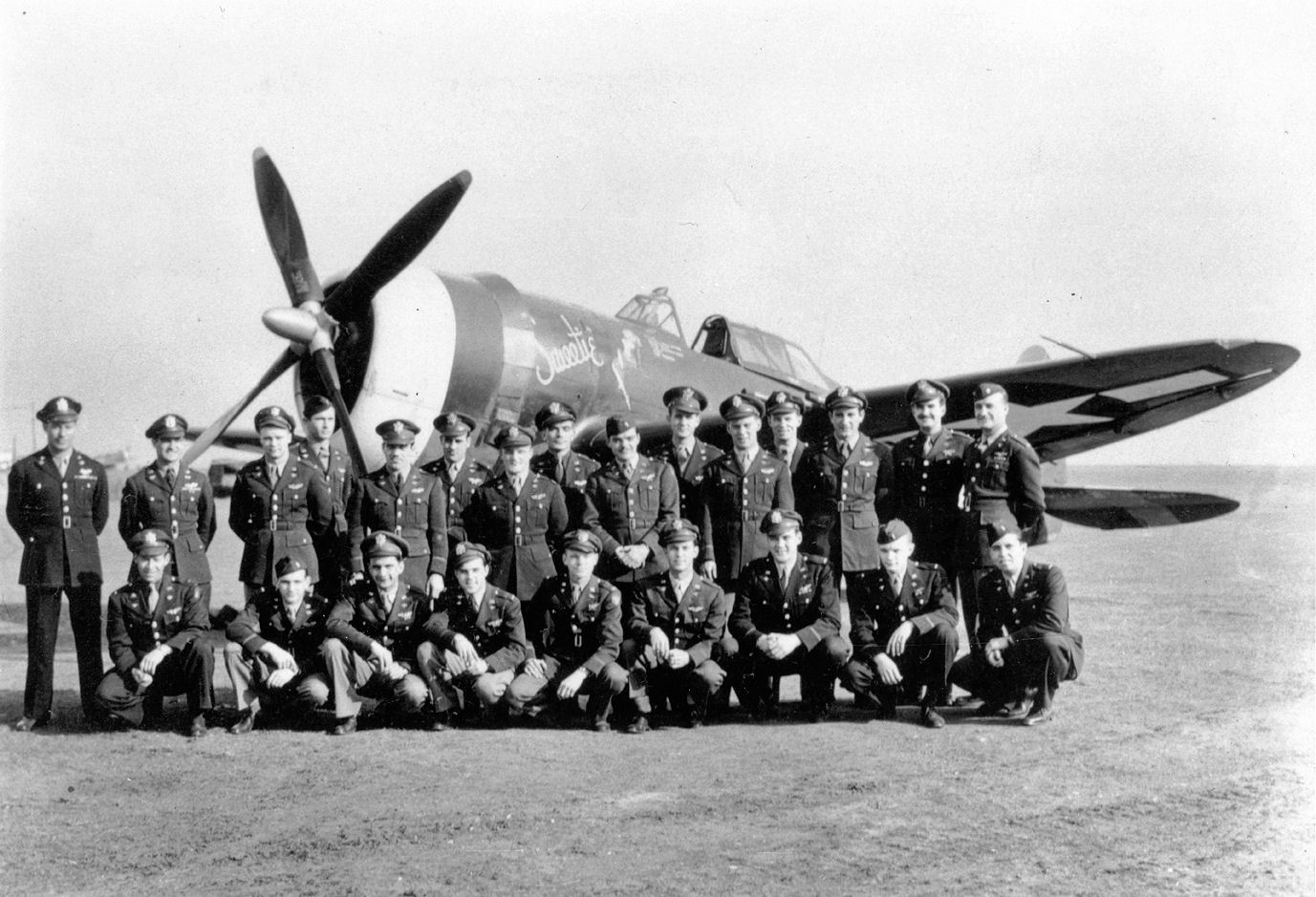
Pilots of the 486th Fighter Squadron, 352nd Fighter Group, in front of P-47 Thunderbolt (PZ-R, serial number 42-8412), named "Sweetie" at Bodney air base in March 1944.

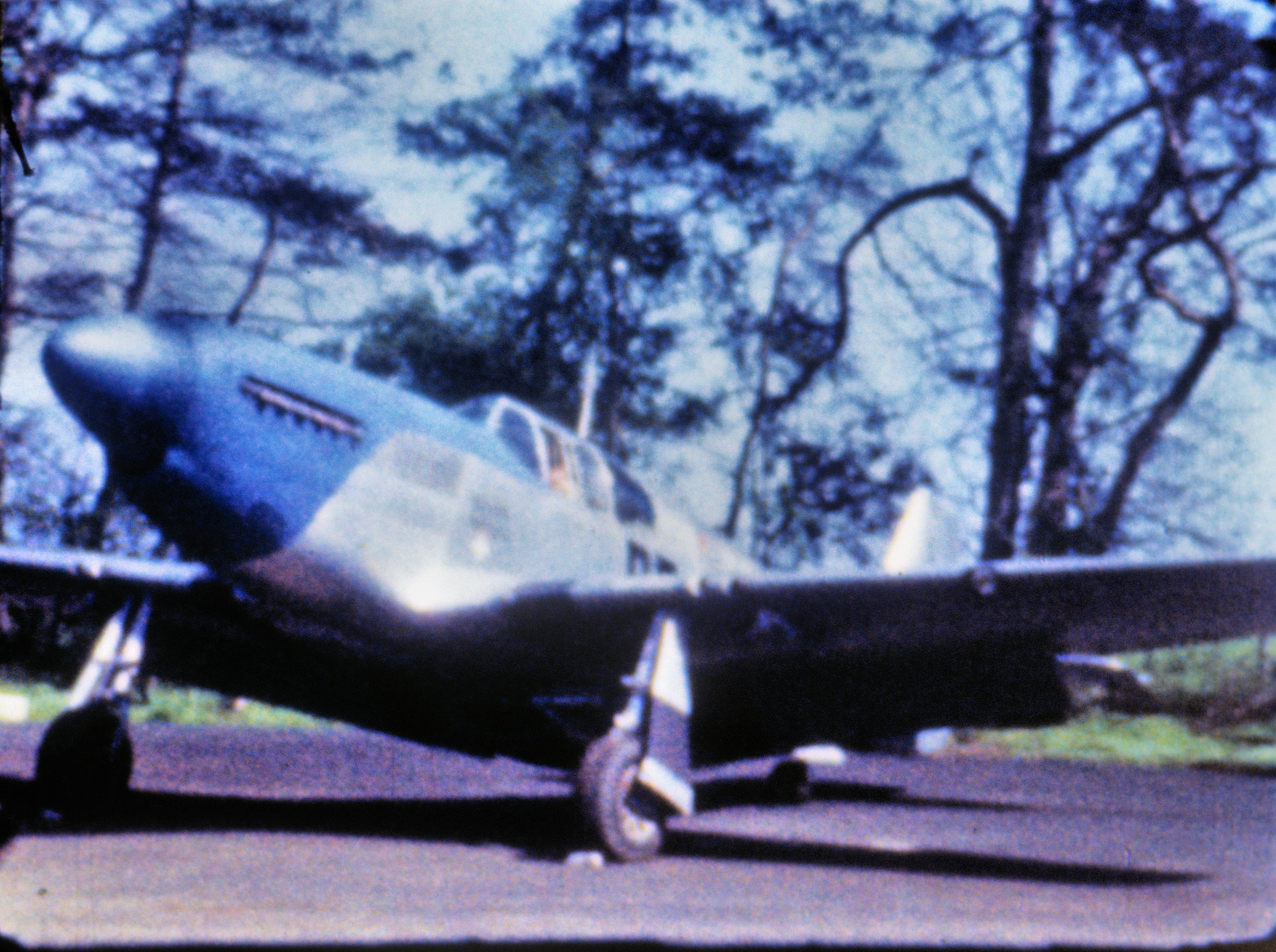
A P-51 Mustang (PE-Z, serial number 42-106459) nicknamed " La Riena Peg " of the 352nd Fighter Group at Bodney, April 1944 running on a revetment at Bodney Lt Col E Clark. PE-Z, 42106459 La Riena Peg.'

Lt. Lincoln Delmar Bundy, a North American P-51 Mustang fighter pilot flying from here, was shot down over occupied France on 10 June 1944. Eluding capture, he joined a mixed group of French resistance fighters and British soldiers in the SAS. Their mission, known as Operation Bulbasket, was sabotage of SS units coming north to oppose the Normandy invasion. The group was ultimately captured, and Bundy, along with the others, was murdered.

USAAF Station Units assigned to RAF Bodney were:

- 1st Service Group (VIII Air Force Service Command)

==== 352nd Fighter Group ====
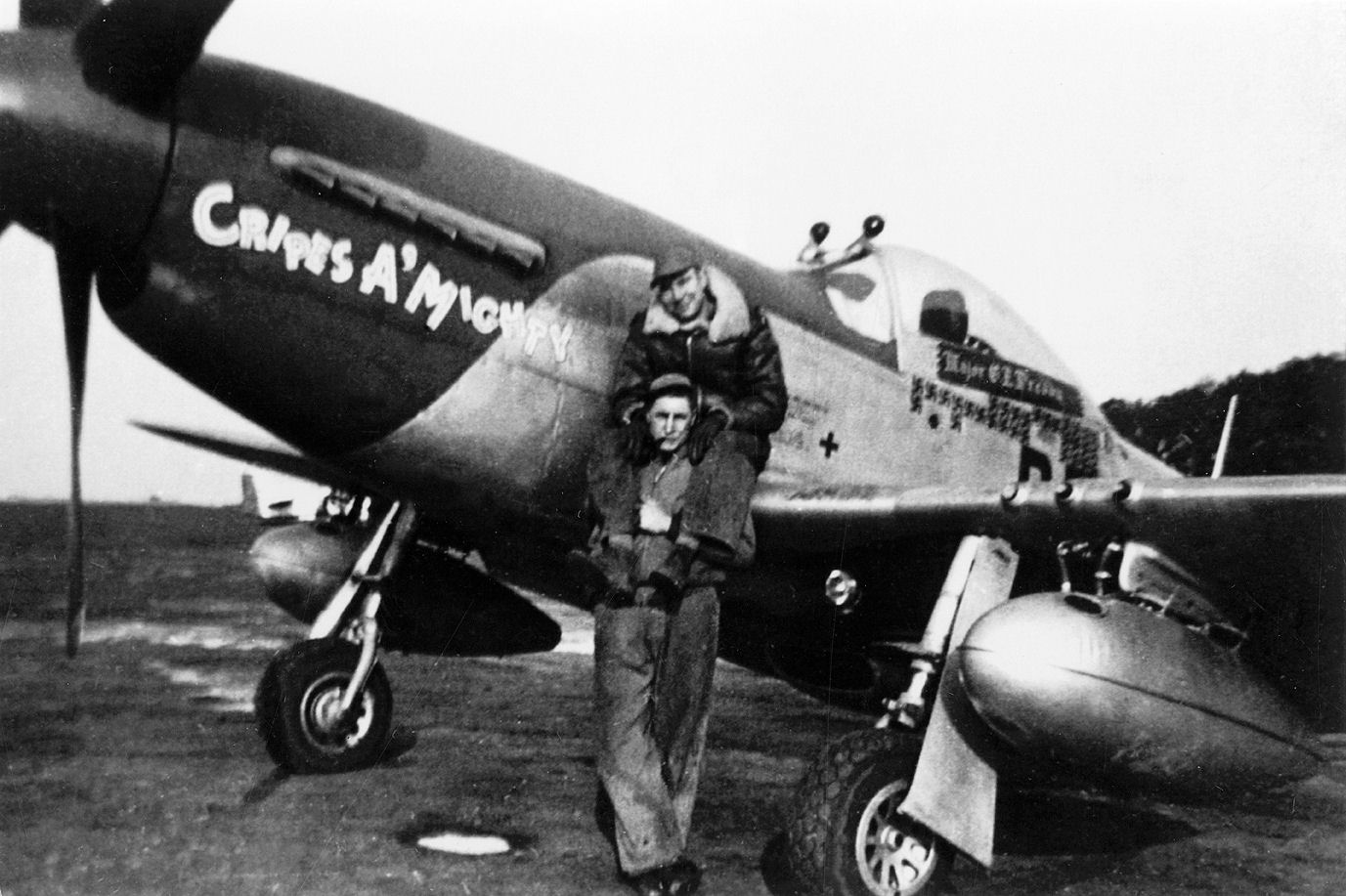
Ground crew in front of P-51 Mustang (PE-P, serial number 44-14906), named "Cripes A' Mighty" and flown by Major George E. Preddy Jr. of the 328th Fighter Squadron, 352nd Fighter Group. 1944.

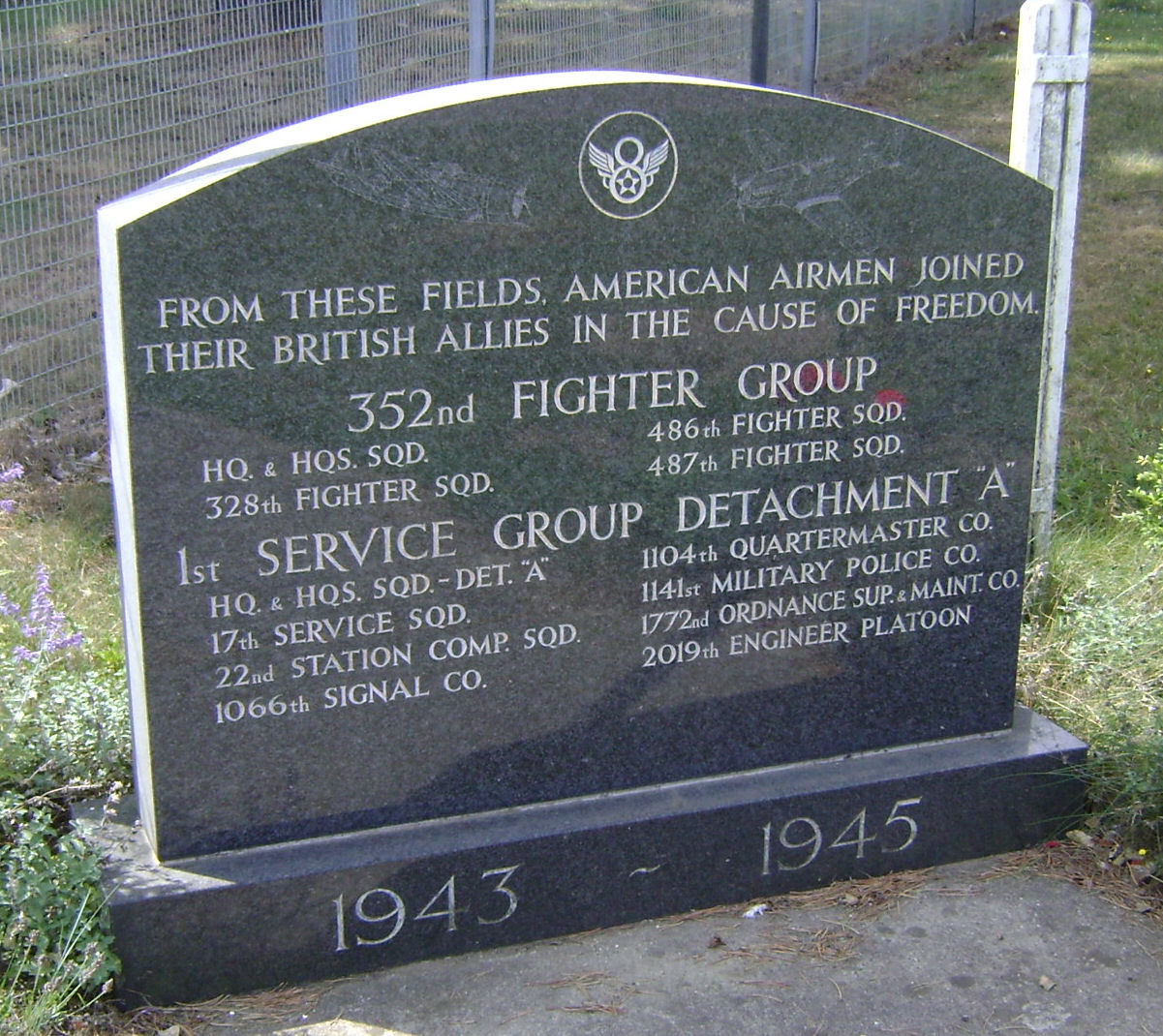
Memorial to the 352d Fighter Group at Bodney Airfield.

- 328th Fighter Squadron
- 486th Fighter Squadron
- 487th Fighter Squadron

== See also ==
- List of former Royal Air Force stations
