= 149th Fighter Squadron =

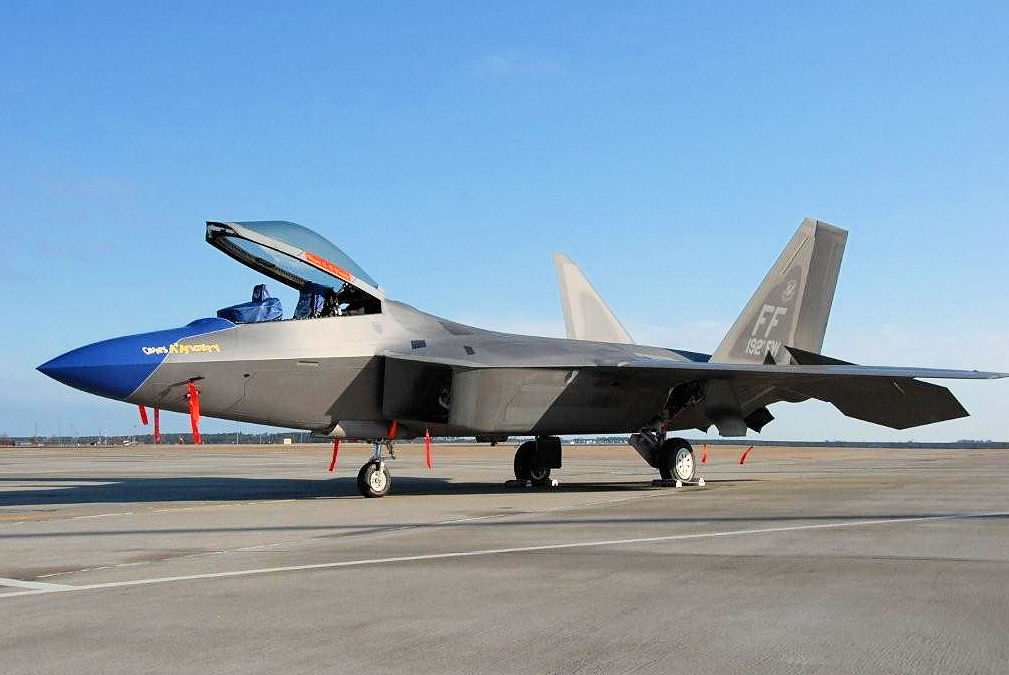
- 192d Fighter Wing’s F-22 Raptor flagship
- Active: 1942–1945; 1947–1952; 1952–2007; 2007–present
- Country: United States
- Allegiance: Virginia
- Branch: Air National Guard
- Type: Squadron
- Role: Air Dominance
- Part of: Virginia Air National Guard
- Garrison/HQ: Joint Base Langley–Eustis, Virginia
- Engagements: European Theater of Operations
- Decorations: Distinguished Unit Citation; French Croix de Guerre with Palm

Commanders
- Current commander: Lieutenant Colonel William J. Shnowske

Insignia
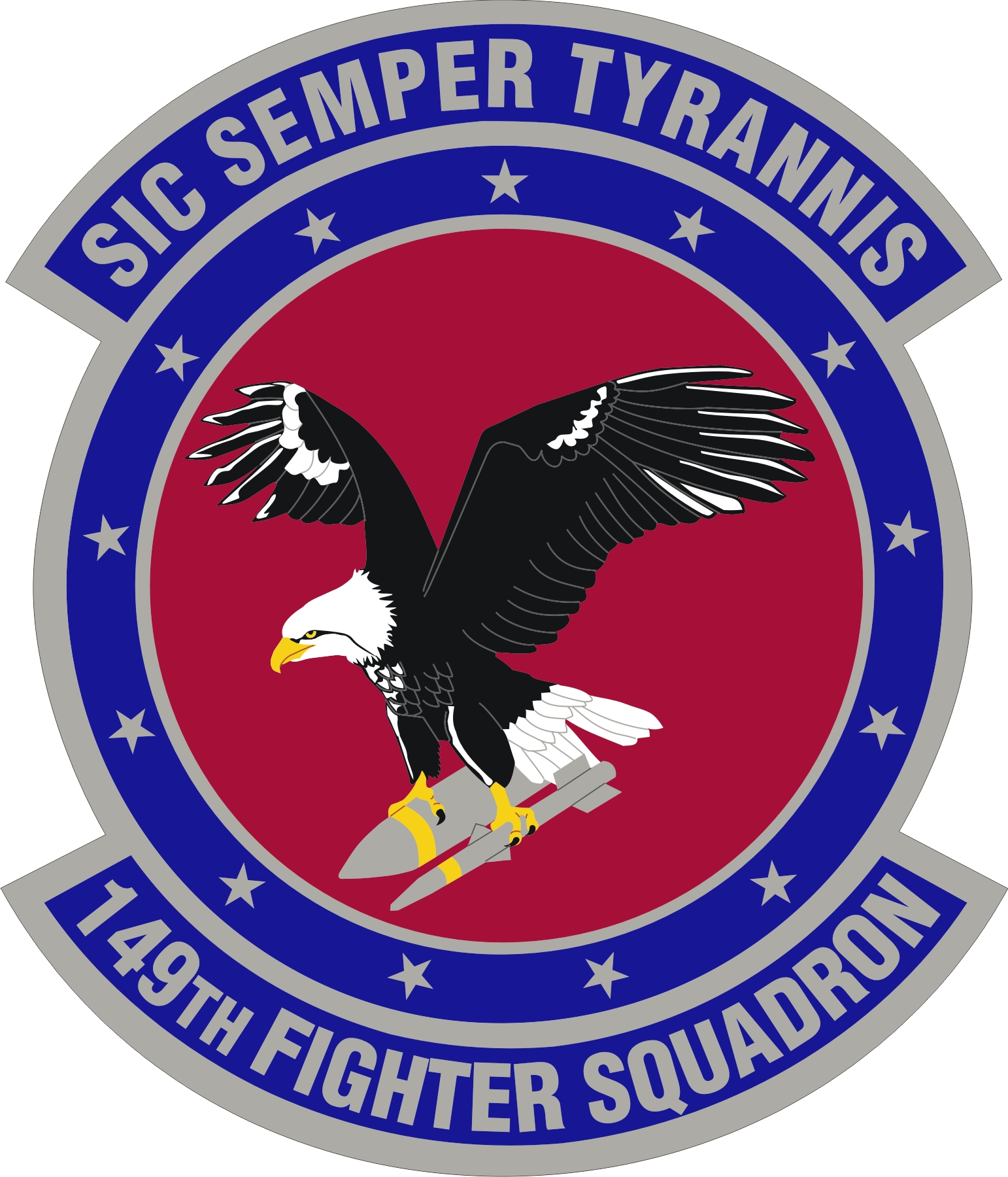
- 149th Fighter Squadron emblem

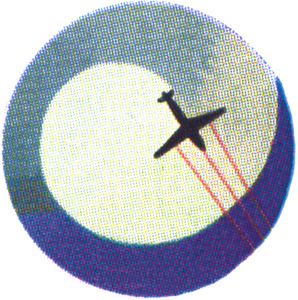
- 328th Fighter Squadron emblem

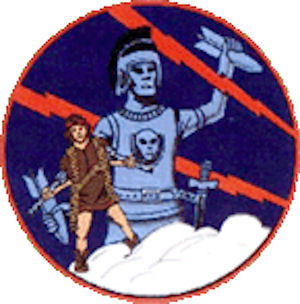
- 328th Fighter Squadron emblem
- Tail code: FF, (Note: The 192d is an associate of the 1st Fighter Wing. "FF" (for First Fighter) is the tail code for that unit.) 192d FW underneath
- World War II fuselage code: PE

The 149th Fighter Squadron is a unit of the Virginia Air National Guard's 192d Fighter Wing housed at Joint Base Langley–Eustis, Virginia. The unit was formed in World War II as the 328th Fighter Squadron, before being redesignated as the 149th after the end of that war. The squadron has flown a succession of aircraft during its history and was the first Air National Guard fighter squadron to fly the F-22 Raptor.

== History ==
=== World War II ===
==== Formation and training in the United States ====
The squadron was activated at Mitchel Field, New York, although its formation occurred at Bradley Field, Connecticut. and it trained with Republic P-47 Thunderbolts at various bases in the northeast United States. While training, the squadron also served in the air defense of the northeast as part of the New York Fighter Wing. In mid-June 1943, the squadron moved to Camp Kilmer and sailed on the RMS Queen Elizabeth for England on 1 July.

==== Combat in the European Theater ====
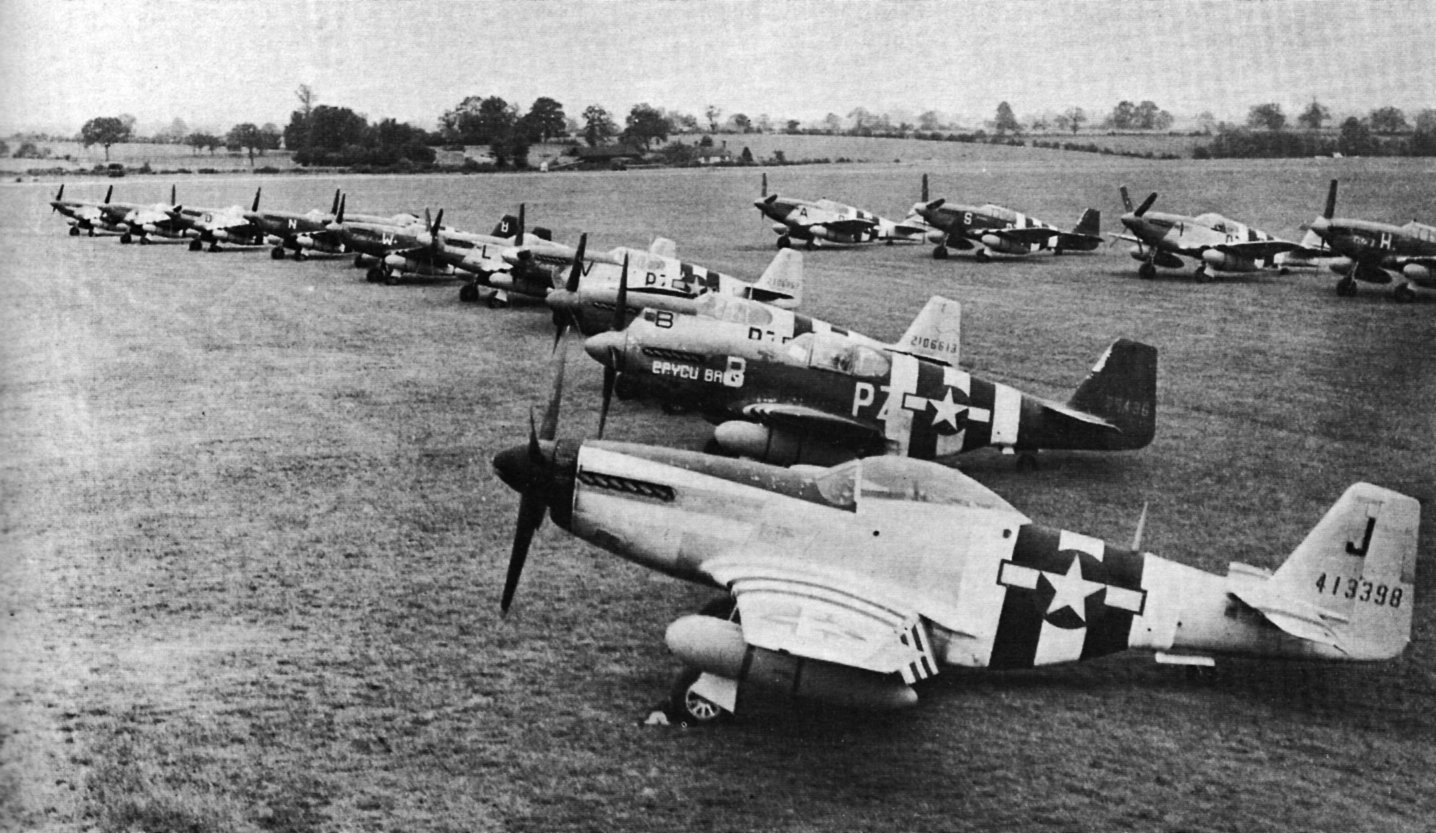
352d Fighter Group P-51s (Note: These Mustangs were deployed to RAF Debden to participate in Operation Frantic. The second plane in the first row is a P-51B or C from the 486th Fighter Squadron.)

The squadron flew its first combat mission on 9 September 1943. It concentrated on flying escort missions for VIII Bomber Command heavy bombers participating in the strategic bombing campaign against Germany. From 20 February to 25 February 1945, it flew cover for bombers involved in the Big Week campaign against the German aircraft manufacturing industry.

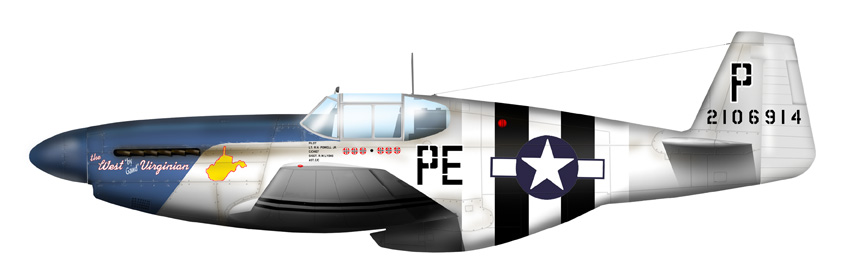
P-51B Mustang of 352d FG/328th FS pilot, Lt. Robert "Punchy" Powell

In April 1944 the squadron began to replace its Thunderbolts with longer range North American P-51D Mustangs. On 8 May, the squadron was escorting bombers on a raid on Braunschweig. It routed an attack by a numerically superior force of German interceptors, continuing the fight until most planes had used all their ammunition and were running short on fuel, requiring the unit to return to base. For this action, the squadron was awarded the Distinguished Unit Citation. In addition to escort missions, the squadron flew counter air missions. Returning from its escort missions, it often engaged in air interdiction attacks.

As the German Army launched the counteroffensive known as the Battle of the Bulge, a detachment of the squadron that included all of its air echelon deployed to Asch Airfield on 23 December 1944 to reinforce Ninth Air Force flying air support missions. On 1 January the detachment earned the squadron the French Croix de Guerre with Palm, when its airfield was attacked by 50 Luftwaffe fighter aircraft, just as its planes were taking off for an area patrol. In the ensuing aerial battle, about half the attacking German aircraft were destroyed with no loss to the squadron. The detachment moved to Chievres Airfield, Belgium in late January 1945, where it was joined by the rest of the squadron, coming under the control of Eighth Air Force again. From Chievres, it provided cover for Operation Varsity, the airborne assault to establish a bridgehead across the Rhine.

In April 1945, the squadron returned to England, flying its last mission on 3 May. It was credited with the destruction of 142.5 enemy aircraft in combat. Following V-E Day, many of the squadron personnel transferred for early return to the United States. The remaining personnel sailed on the RMS Queen Mary on 4 November 1945. After arriving in the United States, the squadron inactivated on 10 November 1945.

=== Virginia Air National Guard ===
The wartime 328th Fighter Squadron was re-designated as the 149th Fighter Squadron, and was allotted to the Virginia ANG, on 24 May 1946. It was organized at Byrd Field, Richmond, Virginia and was extended federal recognition on 21 June 1947. The 149th Fighter Squadron was entitled to the history, honors, and colors of the 328th. The squadron was equipped with F-47D Thunderbolts and was allocated to the Fourteenth Air Force, Continental Air Command by the National Guard Bureau.

The unit was called to active federal service on 1 March 1951. This activation temporarily resulted in the dissolution of the Virginia Air National Guard, as members were sent to various places, including for many, duty in the Korean War. The squadron was sent to Turner AFB, Georgia where it was assigned to the federalized 108th Fighter-Bomber Group with a mission to provide fighter escorts to Strategic Air Command B-50 Superfortress bombers on training missions. In December 1951 it was moved to Godman AFB, Kentucky where it replaced a unit deployed to England. It was released from active duty and returned to Virginia state control on 10 November 1952.

Upon return to state control, the squadron was reorganized as a B-26 Invader light bombardment squadron and allocated to Tactical Air Command. In June 1957 a jurisdictional tug-of-war began between Air Defense Command and Tactical Air Command occurred for control of the squadron. The unit was redesignated the 149th Fighter Interceptor Squadron and was scheduled to get F-86E Sabre jets. However, later that year, the unit became the Tactical Air Command-gained 49th Tactical Fighter Squadron, and F-84F Thunderstreaks began replacing the obsolescent B-26s.

At the height of the Cold War in 1961, the squadron was federalized as a result of tensions concerning the Berlin Wall. Part of the squadron remained at Richmond in an active-duty status for about a year before being released. Twenty-two Virginia ANG members were sent to Chaumont-Semoutiers AB, France, in December 1961 to support the USAFE 7108h Tactical Wing, a deployed unit of the 108th Tactical Fighter Wing, New Jersey ANG. They spent eight months in Europe.

On 15 October 1962, the 149th was authorized to expand to a group level, and the 192d Tactical Fighter Group was established by the National Guard Bureau. The 149th TFS becoming the group's flying squadron. Other squadrons assigned into the group were the 192d Headquarters, 192d Material Squadron (Maintenance), 192d Combat Support Squadron, and the 192d USAF Dispensary.

During 1971, the squadron was assigned the F-105D Thunderchief, a battle-hardened supersonic fighter-bomber that was the backbone of America's fighter element during the Vietnam War. The group's special tasking during the next 10 years included several deployments to Red Flag live-fire exercises at Nellis AFB, Nevada and a Crested Cap NATO deployment to RAF Lakenheath, England, in 1976.

In 1981, the unit transitioned to the Vought A-7D Corsair II, a subsonic jet designed primarily for close-air support. The 10-year A-7 era included several deployments, to Ecuador, Norway, and to Panama, in support of the defense of the Panama Canal. A Virginia contingent competed in Gunsmoke '85, the Air Force's tactical fighter competition, and the 149th was named the world's "Best A-7 Unit." The squadron also earned the General Spruance Safety Award and was recognized as having had the best Operational Readiness Inspection in the Ninth Air Force during 1985. That string of accomplishments helped the squadron earn its first USAF Outstanding Unit Award, which was presented in 1987.

On 20 December 1989, the United States unleashed Operation Just Cause – the emergency dispatch of U.S. forces to Panama to try to oust Panamanian Dictator Manuel Noriega, break up his army and pave the way for democratic elections. The Virginia Air Guard flew 59 Guardsmen and five A-7s to Howard AFB, near Panama City, on 20 January 1990 for its turn in the rotation. The 149th replaced the Ohio ANG's 180th Tactical Fighter Group, whose A-7 pilots had flown 76 sorties in support of Operation Just Cause. Virginia was to send a similar contingent two weeks later to replace its first group. The Virginia Guard's mission differed from previous ones. Some elements of the Panamanian Defense Forces and the Dignity Battalions were suspected to be at large in provinces, and the squadron pilots supplied air cover for field operations and air reconnaissance of areas where enemy activity was suspected.

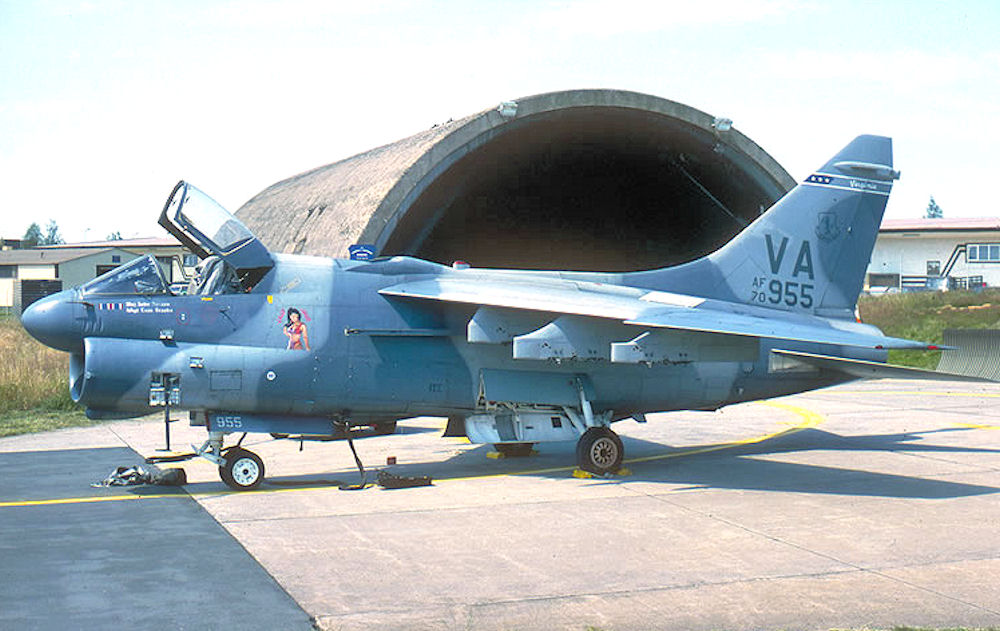
Virginia ANG 149th TFS A-7D Corsair II 70-955

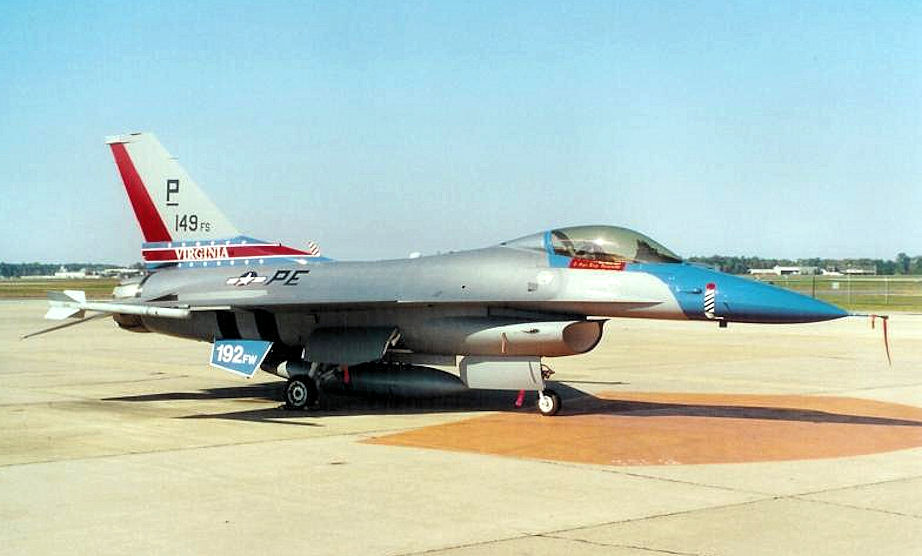
149th Fighter Squadron F-16C 86–0244 in World War II 328th Fighter Squadron markings during 50th anniversary of unit, 1997

The unit soared into a new era of aviation technology in 1991, when it became the first Air National Guard unit to receive the Air Force's upgraded F-16 Fighting Falcon, the F-16C/D block 30. The 149th designation shortened somewhat during 1992 from 149th Tactical Fighter Squadron to 149th Fighter Squadron. This change reflected the adoption of the Objective Wing concept. The unit was initially assigned 24 single-seat F-16C models and two F-16D models. By early 1994, defense cutbacks had reduced the unit's assigned inventory to 18 F-16s, and eventually to only 15 fighter jets.

After the 149th FS became fully operational with the F-16, it was chosen as the lead unit in a four-state Air National Guard F-16 "rainbow" detachment deployed to Incirlik Air Base, Turkey, to support Operation Provide Comfort II.

During that operation between 1 December 1993, and 15 January 1994, ANG pilots patrolled the no-fly zone over northern Iraq to prevent Iraqi forces from inflicting damage on the villages of Kurdish minorities. This was the first time Air National Guard units had been called to active duty to serve in a peacekeeping role in the Mideast, following Iraq's defeat in 1991. The unit returned to Incirlik AB in February 1996 for another round of patrols over Iraq.

During October 1995, the parent 192d's designation was again modified to reflect unit restructuring within the Air Force and Air National Guard. This time the unit designation was changed from 192d Fighter Group to 192d Fighter Wing. The 149th was assigned to the new 192d Operations Group.

In December 2000, the squadron deployed to Southwest Asia and other locations in support of Operation Southern Watch. In addition to Turkey and Kuwait, they were deployed to Prince Sultan Air Base and Eskan Village, Saudi Arabia; Aviano Air Base, Italy; and Qatar.

Also in December 2000, elements of the squadron were deployed on its first Aerospace Expeditionary Force assignment. A 130-person detachment went to Curaçao in the Netherlands Antilles as part of Operation Nighthawk, an effort to stop drug smuggling into the United States. Aside from strictly operational matters, the fighter wing also focused on community support, humanitarian assistance and military heritage.

In October 2005, Lt. Col. Phillip Guy became the first VANG pilot to transition to Langley AFB and fly the new F-22A Raptor in training missions and sorties alongside active duty Air Force pilots stationed there. The first two ship flight of VANG piloted F-22A's taking off from Langley AFB was successfully completed by 192nd FW pilots Lt. Col. Guy and Maj. Patrick DeConcini on 18 February 2006. Later in May, active duty personnel and Virginia guardsmen successfully completed tasking of a first ever joint-exercise requirement.

The last Unit Training Assembly was held in Richmond in September 2007. Remaining base personnel solemnly attended the 'Stand-down' ceremony in the main hangar and watched as the unit flag was rolled-up by Col. Jay Pearsall and then put away. Afterwards a single F-16 took off, turned and passed over the flight deck. The pilot dipped the wings of his jet and made a final fly-by, then continued on to bring the aircraft to its new location. This marked the closing chapter for an era of excellence as the 192d FW began its future with Langley's 1st Fighter Wing.

On 13 October 2007, the 192d FW was reactivated in a ceremony held at the 27th Fighter Squadron, Langley AFB. Integration with the active duty 1st FW allows the Air National Guard to be at the forefront of the latest design of fighter craft. Set-up as a classic 'associate wing' the 192nd FW works directly with the 1st FW yet maintains its own unit identity and command structure. It shares in the support of mission requirements for the F-22A Raptor, but does not own any of the aircraft on station.

In 2020, Lt. Col. William Shnowske took over command of the squadron from former commander Greg Ebert, who had served since 2019, in a ceremony which was broadcast live on social media.

== Lineage ==
- Constituted as 328th Fighter Squadron on 29 September 1942

Activated on 1 October 1942
Inactivated on 10 November 1945
Redesignated 149th Fighter Squadron and allotted to the National Guard on 24 May 1946.
149th Fighter Squadron extended federal recognition on 21 June 1947
Federalized and placed on active duty, 1 March 1951
Redesignated: 149th Fighter-Bomber Squadron, 1 December 1951
Released from active duty and returned to Virginia state control, 10 November 1952
Redesignated 149th Bombardment Squadron (Light) on 10 December 1952
Redesignated 149th Fighter-Interceptor Squadron on 15 June 1957
Redesignated 149th Tactical Reconnaissance Squadron on 10 April 1958
Redesignated 149th Fighter-Interceptor Squadron on 14 June 1958
Redesignated 149th Tactical Fighter Squadron on 10 November 1958
Federalized and placed on active duty, 1 October 1961
Released from active duty and returned to Virginia state control, 30 August 1962
Redesignated 149th Fighter Squadron on 15 March 1992
Inactivated on 30 September 2007
Activated on 13 October 2007

=== Assignments ===
- 352d Fighter Group, 1 Oct 1942 – 10 Nov 1945
- 55th Fighter Wing, 21 June 1947
- 121st Fighter Group, 1 November 1950
- 108th Fighter-Interceptor Group, 1 March 1951
- 121st Fighter-Bomber Group (later 121st Fighter-Interceptor Group, 121st Fighter-Bomber Group, 121st Tactical Fighter Group), 30 November 1952
- 7108th Tactical Wing, 1 October 1961 – 30 August 1962
- 121st Tactical Fighter Group, 1 September 1962
- 192d Tactical Fighter Group (later 192d Fighter Group), 15 October 1962
- 192d Operations Group, 11 Oct 1995 – 30 September 2007; 13 October 2007 – Present

=== Stations ===
- Mitchel Field, New York, 1 October 1942
- Bradley Field, Connecticut, 7 October 1942
- Westover Field, Massachusetts, 1 November 1942
- Groton Army Airfield, Connecticut, 18 January 1943
- Mitchel Field, New York, c. 17 Feb–Jun 1943
- RAF Bodney (AAF-141), England, c. 7 July 1943 (detachment operated from Asch Airfield (Y-29), Belgium, 23 Dec 1944 – 27 Jan 1945)
- Chievres Airfield (A-84), Belgium, 28 January 1945
- RAF Bodney (AAF-141), England, c. 13 Apr-4 Nov 1945
- Camp Kilmer, New Jersey, 9–10 Nov 1945
- Byrd Field, Virginia, 21 Jun 1947
- Turner Air Force Base, Georgia, 1 March 1951
- Godman Air Force Base, Kentucky, 11 Dec 1951 – 1 December 1952
- Byrd Field, Virginia, ! December 1952
- Chaumont-Semoutiers Air Base, France, 1 October 1961
- Byrd Field (Later Richmond International Airport, Richmond Air National Guard Station, Virginia, 30 August 1962 – 30 Sep 2007
- Langley Air Force Base (later Joint Base Langley-Eustis), Virginia, 13 Oct 2007 – present

=== Aircraft ===
- P-47 Thunderbolt, 1942–1944
- P-51 Mustang, 1944–1945
- F-47D Thunderbolt, 1947–1952
- B-26 Invader, 1952–1958
- F-86E Sabre, 1957
- RB-57 Canberra, 1958
- F-84F Thunderstreak, 1958–1971
- F-105D Thunderchief, 1971–1982
- A-7D/K Corsair II, 1982–1992
- F-16C Fighting Falcon, 1992–2007
- F-22A Raptor, 2007–Present
