= William Tell (aerial gunnery competition) =

American competition with fighter aircraft

William Tell is a biennial aerial gunnery competition with fighter aircraft held by the United States Air Force (USAF) in every even-numbered year. In the competition, teams representing the various major commands of the USAF compete in live-fire exercises, using towed banner targets for gun engagements, and obsolete fighters converted into unmanned target drones (currently QF-4 Phantoms) for air-to-air missile engagements. The competition is held in even-numbered years, while the similar Hawgsmoke competition is held in odd-numbered years; Hawgsmoke replaced the earlier Gunsmoke.

The William Tell competition in 1972 was held at Tyndall AFB in Florida. Twelve teams competed: three F-101 Voodoo teams, three F-102 Delta Dagger teams, and six F-106 Delta Dart teams. 1972 was also when the first "Top Gun" award was won, by a Royal Canadian Air Force team from the first French-Canadian fighter squadron, the 425 All Weather Fighter Squadron "Les Alouettes". The recipients were Capt. Lowell Butters (Pilot) and Capt. Douglas Danko (Navigator), flying the McDonnell CF-101 Voodoo.

The first competition was held in 1949 at a test airfield outside of Las Vegas, NV, now called Nellis AFB. The winner was the 332nd Fighter group of Capt. Alva Temple, Lt. Col James Harvey III, Lt. Col. Harry Stewart, and alternate 1st Lt. Halbert Alexander. Post-Cold War budget cuts ended William Tell after 1996, although a commemorative 50th anniversary competition was held in 2004. After a 19-year hiatus, William Tell returned in 2023 with nine teams: three F-22 Raptor teams, three F-35 Lightning II teams, and three F-15 Eagle teams; the overall winner of 2023 was the 1st Fighter Wing flying the F-22.
