= 192d Wing =

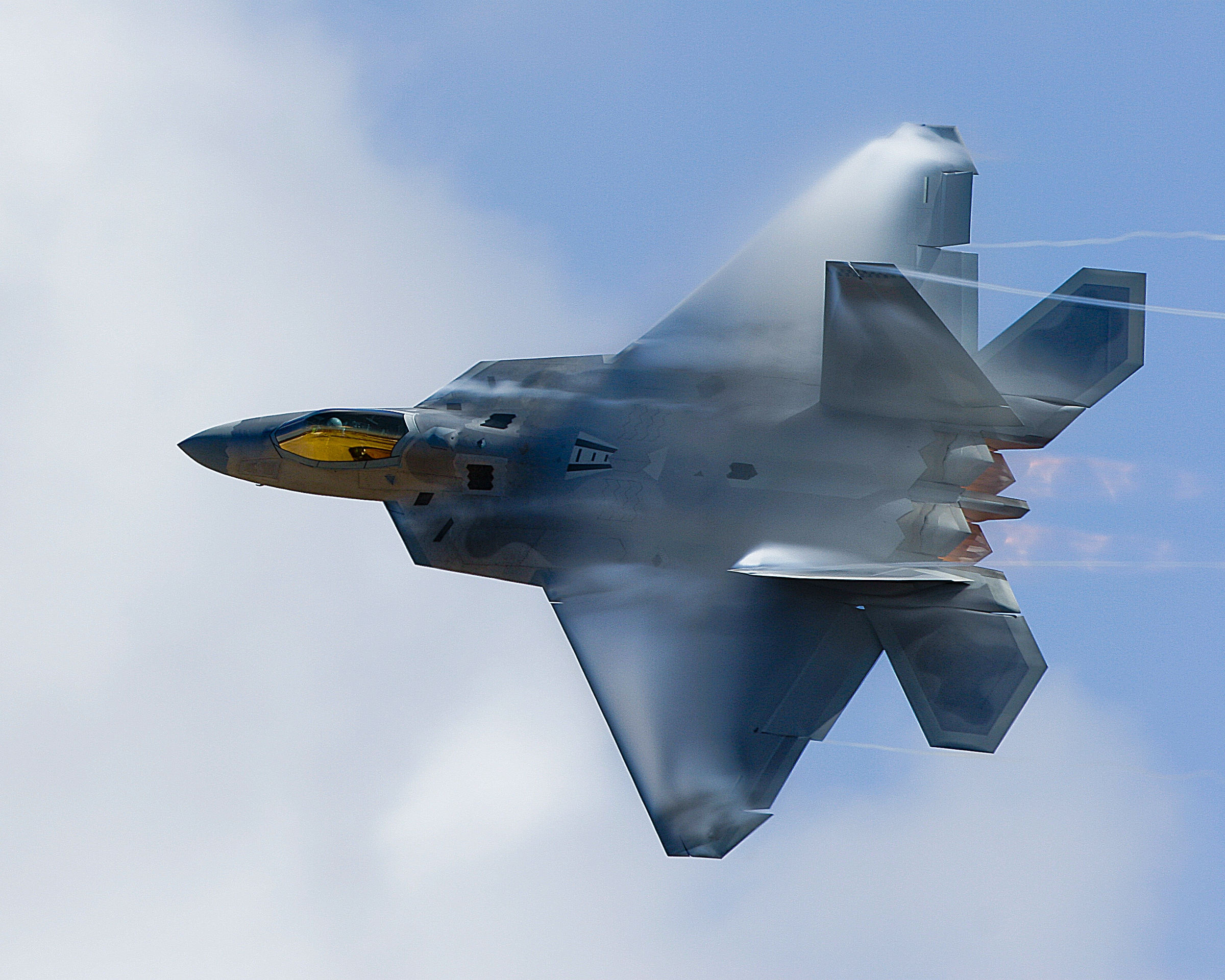
- 192d Wing F-22 Raptor
- Active: 1962–2007; 2007–present
- Country: United States
- Allegiance: Virginia
- Branch: Air National Guard
- Type: Wing
- Role: Air dominance; intelligence; cyberspace operations; combat support
- Part of: Virginia Air National Guard
- Garrison/HQ: Joint Base Langley–Eustis, Hampton, Virginia
- Website: www.192wg.ang.af.mil

Commanders
- Current commander: Colonel Andrew M. Weidner

Insignia
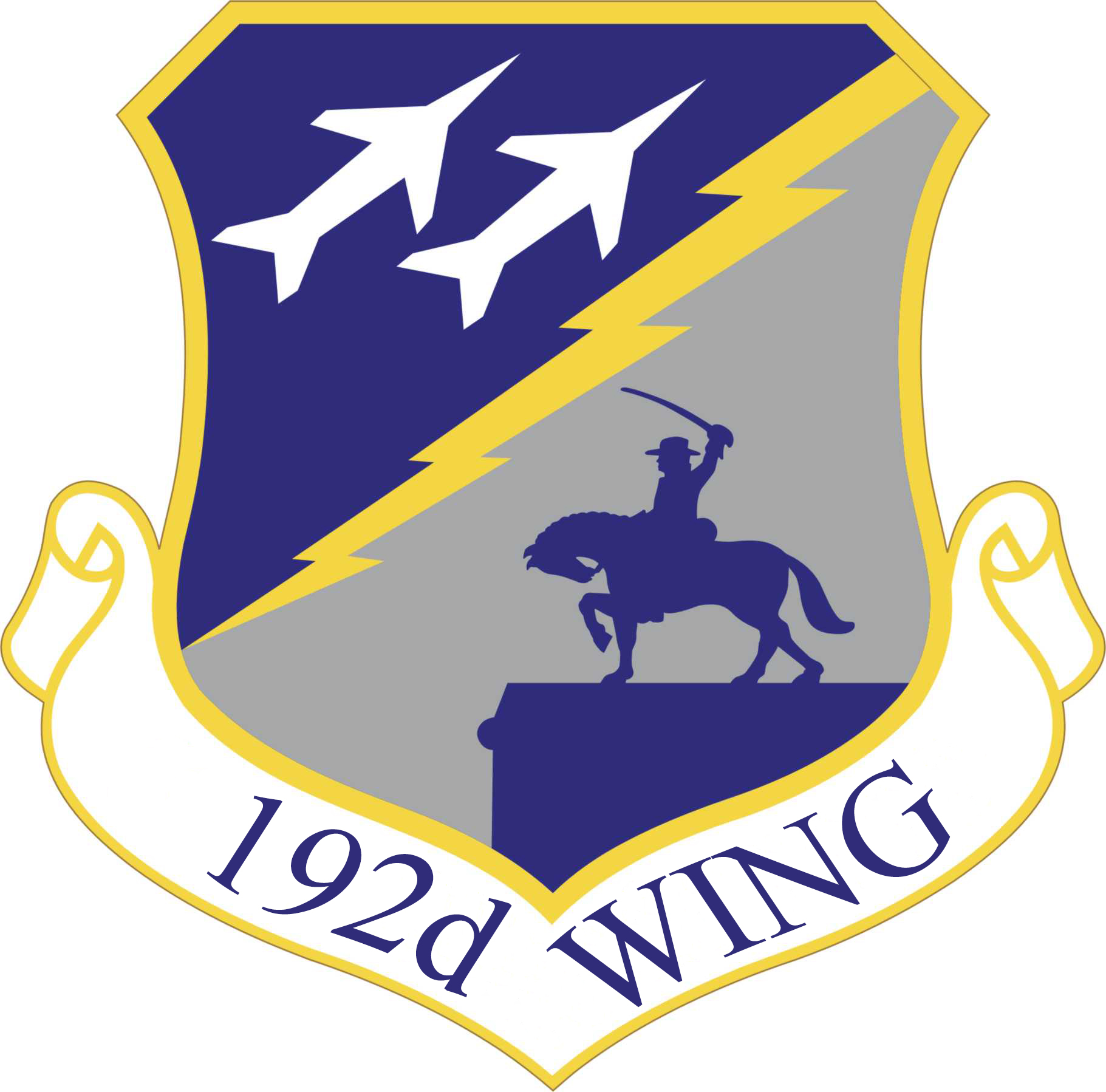
- 192d Wing emblem

Aircraft flown
- Fighter: F-22A Raptor, 2007–present

The 192d Wing (Note: 192d Wing is the official military nomenclature of the unit. Air Force Instruction 38-101, Chapter 28; "Procedures for Naming and Numbering Units", Figure 28.1, gives an example of using '2d Bomb Wing', and section 28.5; "Unit Kind", gives an example of "3d Wing". Section 28.4.4 – Reserves numbers 101 through 299 for Air National Guard units .) is a unit of the Virginia Air National Guard and the United States Air Force, stationed at Joint Base Langley-Eustis, Virginia. When activated to federal service, the 192d Wing is gained by Air Combat Command.

== Mission ==
The 192d Wing, Virginia Air National Guard, is a fully trained volunteer force dedicated to protecting the nation, the Commonwealth of Virginia, and local communities. Federally, it supplies combat-ready personnel and equipment to support U.S. security objectives; at the state level, it safeguards life and property and maintains public order; in the community, it supports local, state, and national programs that benefit the U.S.

The wing is based at Joint Base Langley–Eustis, works with the regular Air Force, and conducts independent federal missions.

== Units ==
The 192d Wing is composed of four groups:

- 192d Operations Group
  - 149th Fighter Squadron
  - 192d Operations Support Squadron
  - 192d Intelligence Squadron
  - 185th Cyberspace Operations Squadron
  - 200th Weather Flight (geographically separated; Sandston, Virginia)
- 192d Maintenance Group
  - 192d Aircraft Maintenance Squadron
  - 192d Maintenance Squadron
  - 192d Maintenance Operations Flight
- 192d Mission Support Group
  - 192d Support Squadron
  - 192d Security Forces Squadron
  - 203d Rapid Engineer Deployable Heavy Operational Repair Squadron Engineers (RED HORSE) (geographically separated; Virginia Beach, Virginia)
- 192d Medical Group (includes CERFP / Guard Medical Unit elements)

== History ==
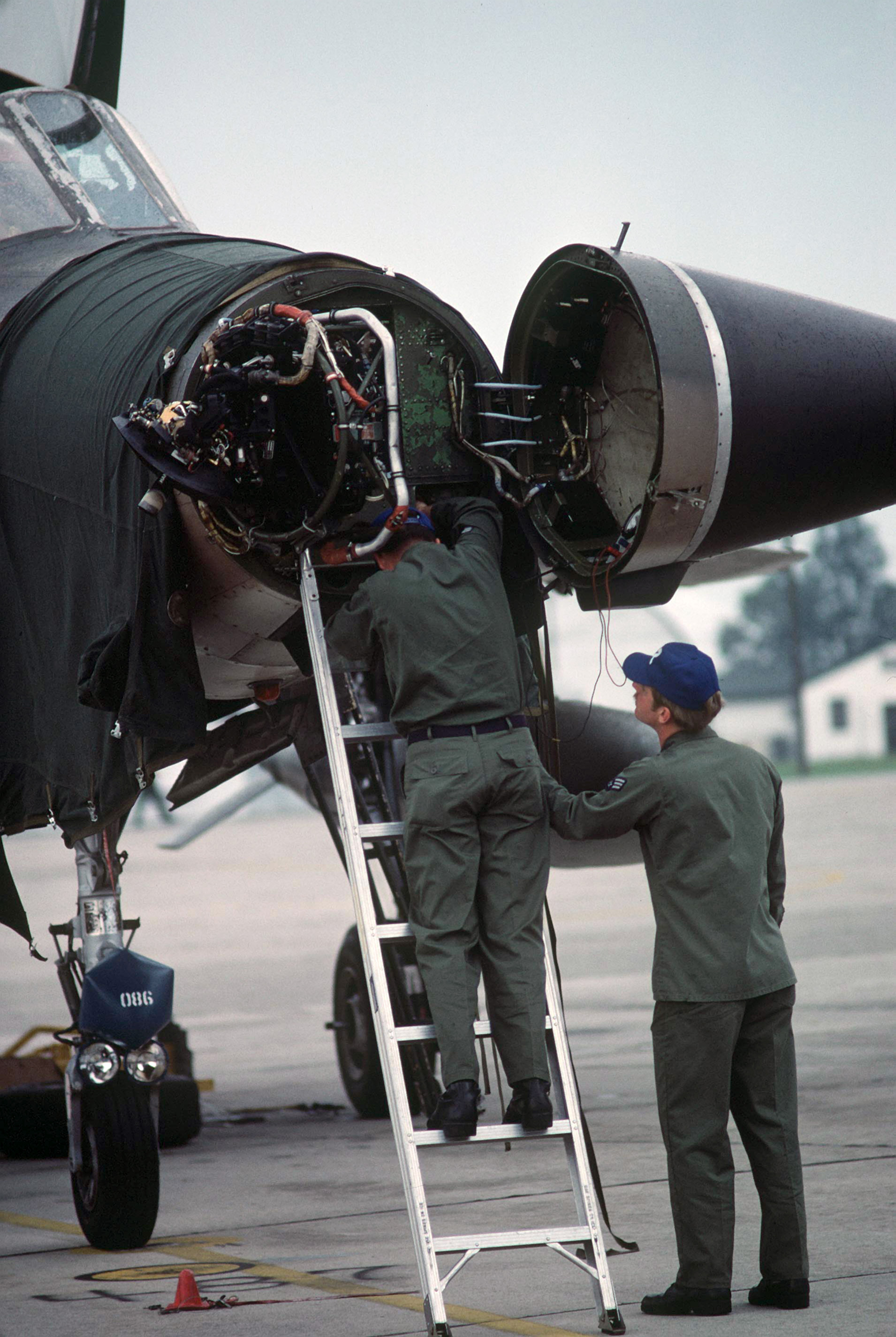
A 192d TFG F-105D, 1978

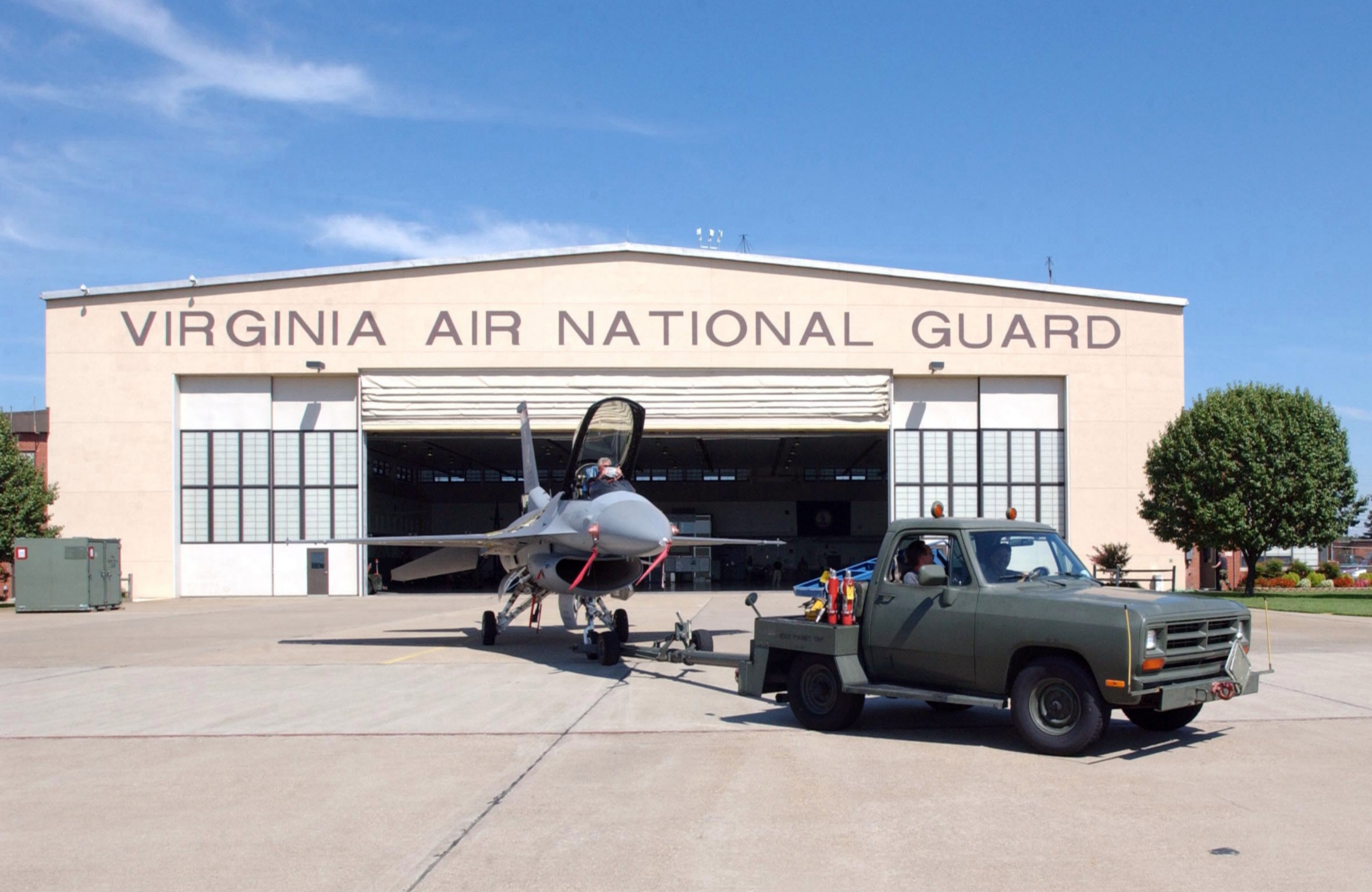
A Virginia ANG F-16C, 2003

On 15 October 1962, the Virginia Air National Guard's 149th Tactical Fighter Squadron was authorized to expand to a group-level organization, and the 192d Tactical Fighter Group (192 TFG) was established by the National Guard Bureau. The 149th became the group's flying squadron. Other squadrons assigned to the group were the 192d Headquarters, 192d Material Squadron (Maintenance), 192d Combat Support Squadron, and the 192d USAF Dispensary.

In 1971, the 192d received the F-105D Thunderchief, a battle-tested supersonic fighter-bomber used heavily in the Vietnam War. Over the next decade, the group deployed several times to Red Flag exercises at Nellis Air Force Base, Nevada and to RAF Lakenheath, England, in 1976.

In 1981, the unit was converted to the A-7D Corsair II, a subsonic jet aircraft designed for close air support. The decade-long A-7 era included several deployments to Howard Air Force Base, Panama to aid the defense of the Panama Canal, and two trips to Norway, in 1985 and 1989. Shortly after a deployment to Ecuador, the 192d deployed in September 1985 to Evenes Air Station, Norway, 150 miles (240 km) above the Arctic Circle.

A few weeks later, a Virginia ANG contingent competed in Gunsmoke '85, the Air Force's tactical fighter competition, and the 192d was named the world's "Best A-7 Unit". The 192d also earned the General Spruance Safety Award and was recognized as having the best operational readiness inspection in the Ninth Air Force in 1985. In 1987, the 192d earned its first Air Force Outstanding Unit Award.

In 1991, the 192d became the first Air National Guard unit to receive the Air Force's upgraded F-16 Fighting Falcon—the F-16C/D. The unit was initially assigned 24 single-seat F-16C aircraft and 2 F-16D aircraft. By early 1994, defense cutbacks reduced the unit's assigned inventory to 18 F-16s, and eventually to 15. Conversion to the F-16 airframe required the 192d to build a $2 million "hush house", a special noise-suppression hangar, to test the jets' engines without bothering neighbors. The 192d's designation was shortened in 1992, from 192d Tactical Fighter Group to 192d Fighter Group, reflecting the retirement of former Tactical Air Command and the creation of the new multi-role mission Air Combat Command.

After the 192d became fully operational with the F-16, it was chosen as the lead unit in a four-state Air National Guard F-16 "rainbow" detachment deployment to Incirlik Air Base, Turkey to support Operation Provide Comfort II. Between 1 December 1993 and 15 January 1994, ANG pilots patrolled the no-fly zone over northern Iraq to prevent Iraqi forces from inflicting damage on the villages of Kurdish minorities. This marked the first time Air National Guard units were called to active duty in the Middle East, following Iraq's defeat in 1991. The unit returned to Incirlik in February 1996 for another round of patrols over Iraq.

In October 1995, the wing designation was changed to 192d Fighter Wing. At the direction of the commander of Air Combat Command, in January, the 192d also became a test regional repair center for F-16 engines. The 18-month assignment called for the 192d propulsion section to strip and rebuild General Electric F110-GE-100 engines for its own F-16s as well as for active duty F-16s assigned to Pope Air Force Base, North Carolina. During this period, the Air Force aimed to reduce the number of F-16 maintenance workers, consolidate training, eliminate resource duplication, and lower maintenance costs per flying hour. In addition to these changes, the 192 FW was also selected to test the capability of electro-optical "recce" pods. After becoming mission-capable with the pods in April 1996, the fighter wing subsequently deployed to Aviano Air Base, Italy in May 1996 for the first contingency use of the new pods and computerized imaging equipment. For 45 days, the 192d flew "recce" missions over Bosnia to support international peacekeeping efforts. As a result of its performance, the wing was awarded its second Air Force Outstanding Unit Award in December 1996.

In December 2000, 29 members of the 192d deployed to Southwest Asia in support of Operation Southern Watch. In addition to Turkey and Kuwait, they were deployed to Prince Sultan Air Base (aircraft, pilots, and maintainers), Eskan Village, Saudi Arabia (pilots assigned to CAOC duty), Aviano Air Base, Italy, and Qatar. Also in December, the 192d deployed on its first assignment as an Aerospace Expeditionary Force (AEF). A 130-person detachment went to Curaçao in the Netherlands Antilles as part of Operation Coronet Nighthawk, an effort to stop drug smuggling into the United States.

On 21 September 2000, the 192d hosted a reunion for the 352nd Fighter Group, the highly decorated World War II unit to which the 192d's 149th Fighter Squadron traces its military lineage. Over 100 World War II veterans and nearly 300 of their family members attended.

In the wake of September 11, 2001, more than 400 unit members were called to active duty for up to two years, marking a period of prolonged intensity at the Richmond Air National Guard Base, unmatched since the Berlin call-up of 1961–62. Beginning in mid-September, combat air patrols were flown day and night for 218 consecutive days until mid-April 2002 for a total of 820 operational sorties and 3,515.5 flying hours. To support 24-hour-a-day operations, the unit installed three alert trailers for F-16 crews and set up on-base laundry facilities, a mini Base Exchange (BX), and a small gymnasium.

In September and October 2003, in support of Operation Iraqi Freedom, the 192d Fighter Wing deployed more than 300 personnel to an undisclosed base in Southwest Asia.

In 2005, BRAC recommendations directed the realignment of Richmond International Airport Air Guard Station, including the redistribution of the wing's F-16 aircraft, the transfer of real property accountability to the Department of the Army, and the association of the wing's manpower with the active-duty 1st Fighter Wing.

On 13 October 2007, the order to reactivate the 192d was read by Lieutenant Colonel Dave Kolmer at the activation ceremony held at the 27th Fighter Squadron, Langley AFB. Integration with the active-duty 1 FW allows the Air National Guard to be at the forefront of the latest fighter aircraft design, jointly flying and maintaining F-22 aircraft assigned to the 1st Fighter Wing.

Following this integration and growth, on 1 October 2018, the 192d Fighter Wing was redesignated as the 192d Wing by order of the Secretary of the Air Force. The wing held a ceremony on 13 October 2018, at Joint Base Langley-Eustis, bringing down the old wing flag for the last time and raising the new one. The wing's 12 distinct mission sets include F-22 fighter jet operations and maintenance, intelligence analysis, cyber operations, medical support, civil engineering, communications, logistics readiness, security forces, force support, finance, contracting, and chaplain services. This redesignation reflects the wing's growth and diversity.

=== Lineage ===
- Constituted as the 192d Tactical Fighter Group and allotted to Virginia ANG in 1962
- Extended federal recognition and activated on 15 October 1962
- Redesignated 192d Fighter Group on 15 March 1992
- Redesignated 192d Fighter Wing on 11 October 1995
- Inactivated on 30 September 2007
- Activated on 13 October 2007
- Redesignated: 192d Wing on 1 October 2018

=== Assignments ===
- Virginia Air National Guard, 15 October 1962
- Gained by: Tactical Air Command
- Gained by: Air Combat Command, 1 June 1992 – 30 September 2007
- Virginia Air National Guard, 13 October 2007
- Became associate unit of 1st Fighter Wing, 13 October 2007
- Gained by Air Combat Command

=== Components ===
- 192d Operations Group, 11 October 1995 – 30 September 2007; 13 October 2007 – present
- 149th Tactical Fighter Squadron (later 149th Fighter Squadron), 15 October 1962 – 11 October 1995
- 192d Mission Support Group
- 192d Medical Group
- 192d Maintenance Group

=== Stations ===
- Richmond International Airport / Richmond Air National Guard Station, Virginia, 15 October 1962
- Langley Air Force Base (later Joint Base Langley-Eustis), Virginia, 13 October 2007 – present

=== Aircraft ===
- B-26 Invader, 1954–1958
- F-84F Thunderstreak, 1962–1971
- F-105D Thunderchief, 1971–1982
- A-7D Corsair II, 1982–1992
- F-16C Fighting Falcon, 1992–2007
- F-22A Raptor, 2007–present

=== Commanders ===
Commander History
Name	Title	Assumed Command	Relieved Command	Photo
Colonel ROBERT "GHOST" J. GREY	Commander, 192d Fighter Wing	July 2014	March 2016	
Colonel STEPHEN H. BUNTING	Commander, 192d Fighter Wing	March 2016	August 2019	COLONEL STEPHEN H BUNTING
Colonel FRANK "KIDD" J. LOBASH	Commander, 192d Fighter Wing (Before Redesignation) Commander, 192d Wing	November 2017	August 2019	
Colonel MARK "PIED" D. PIPER	Commander, 192d Wing	August 2019	January 2021	
Colonel CHRISTOPHER "SKOSH" G. BATTERTON	Commander, 192d Wing	January 2021	September 2023	
Colonel BROCK "MAGMA" E. LANGE	Commander, 192d Wing	September 2023	September 2025	
Colonel ANDREW "OGRE" M. WEIDNER	Commander, 192d Wing	September 2025	Current	
