= Harry W. Brown (pilot) =

- Born: May 19, 1921; Amarillo, Texas, U.S.
- Died: October 7, 1991 (aged 70); Walnut Creek, California, U.S.
- Military career
- Allegiance: United States
- Branch: United States Army Air Corps; United States Army Air Forces; United States Air Force Reserve
- Service years: 1940–1948
- Rank: Lieutenant colonel
- Units: 47th Pursuit Squadron; 9th Fighter Squadron; 431st Fighter Squadron
- Conflicts: World War II: Attack on Pearl Harbor; New Guinea campaign
- Awards: Silver Star; Distinguished Flying Cross (2); Air Medal (3)

Harry Winston Brown (May 19, 1921 – October 7, 1991) was an Army Air Corps second lieutenant assigned to the 47th Pursuit Squadron at Wheeler Field on the island of Oahu during the Japanese attack on December 7, 1941. He was one of the five American pilots to score victories that day. Brown was awarded a Silver Star for his actions, and was the first Texan decorated for valor in the war. By the war's end, he was a flying ace.

== Early life ==
Brown was born in Amarillo, Texas, and entered the Army Air Corps in September 1940. He was commissioned at Kelly Field, Texas on August 15, 1941, and was immediately assigned to the 47th Pursuit Group at Wheeler Field, Hawaii.

== World War II ==
=== Attack on Pearl Harbor ===
Brown and another pilot, Johnny Dains, watched as the first wave of Japanese planes flew over. Quickly they decided to head for Haleiwa Field, assuming that the raiders had missed that auxiliary field. They took Brown's car and picked up Lt. Bob Rogers along the way, dodging a Japanese pilot intent on strafing the convertible. Dains was shot down and killed by friendly anti-aircraft fire later that day.

Brown took off in a Curtiss P-36 fighter dressed in pajama tops, tuxedo trousers, house-shoes, flight helmet and goggles. (But for the goggles, his "uniform" can be seen today at the USAF Museum, at Wright-Patterson Field in Dayton, Ohio.) After he took off, he found that only one .30 caliber machine gun would function.

Brown formed as the lead ship with 2nd Lt. Malcolm "Mike" Moore, from the 46th Pursuit Squadron from Wheeler Field. Together they flew north and engaged two Mitsubishi A6M2b “Zero” fighters from the aircraft carrier Sōryū. Brown hit one of the planes piloted by PO1c Takeshi Atsumi. Brown later wrote that he saw a "big fire" in Atsumi's plane, but lost track of it and assumed it had escaped. Brown last saw it headed west off Kaena Point. The plane was found where it crashed, in the channel between Kauai and Niihau islands, in 2002.

Brown managed to shoot down another Kate before the raid was over, though he was not officially credited with the second victory until March 1942 and all Kates made it back to their carriers.

=== Combat over the Pacific ===
In August 1942 he was assigned to the 9th Fighter Squadron, 49th Fighter Group based in Australia flying Curtiss P-40s. Brown scored his third victory, an Oscar, over Lae, New Guinea during the Battle of the Bismarck Sea on March 4, 1943.

Brown, by then promoted to captain, was assigned as a flight leader with the 475th Fighter Group ("Satan's Angels") 431st Fighter Squadron, flying the Lockheed P-38. Brown scored the group's first three victories, downing three A6M Zeros, and becoming a flying ace, over New Guinea on August 16, 1943, and his seventh victory, a Zeke, over Rabaul on October 24.

== Post-war ==
Brown served as base commander of McGuire AFB, New Jersey prior to leaving the service in August 1948.

Remaining in the Air Force Reserve, he earned undergraduate and master's degrees at the University of Denver and was subsequently promoted to lieutenant colonel.

Brown served as personnel manager for the Bechtel Company in San Francisco for 10 years and commanded a Reserve air-sea rescue squadron at Lowry AFB, Colorado.

Brown died on October 7, 1991, in Walnut Creek, California.
