= Virginia Air National Guard =

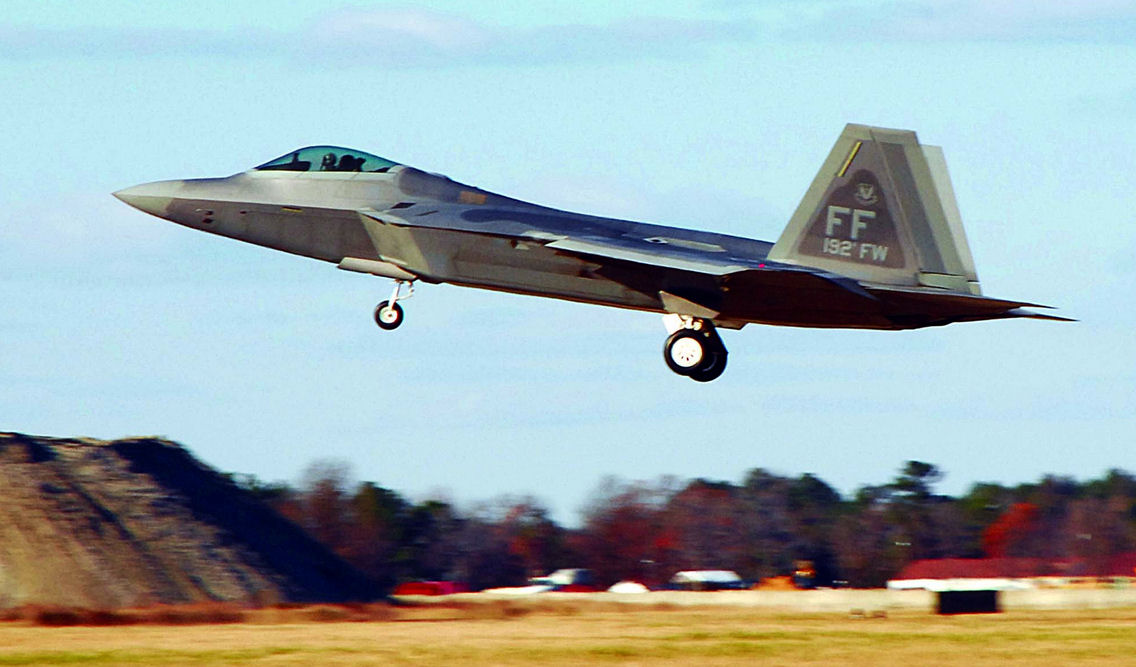
- An F-22 Raptor of the 149th Fighter Squadron at Joint Base Langley–Eustis. The 149th is the oldest unit in the Virginia Air National Guard, having over 70 years of service to the commonwealth and nation.
- Active: 21 June 1947 - present
- Country: United States
- Allegiance: Virginia
- Branch: Air National Guard
- Type: Military reserve force, state militia
- Role: "To meet commonwealth and federal mission responsibilities."
- Size: 1,200
- Part of: Virginia National Guard; United States National Guard Bureau; National Guard
- Garrison/HQ: Virginia Air National Guard, Joint Force Headquarters, Richmond, Virginia
- Website: Virginia Air National Guard

Commanders
- Civilian leadership: President Donald Trump (Commander-in-Chief); Troy Meink (Secretary of the Air Force); Governor Abigail Spanberger (Governor of the Commonwealth of Virginia)
- Adjutant General: MG James W. Ring
- Air Component Commander: Brig Gen Christopher G. Batterton

Insignia
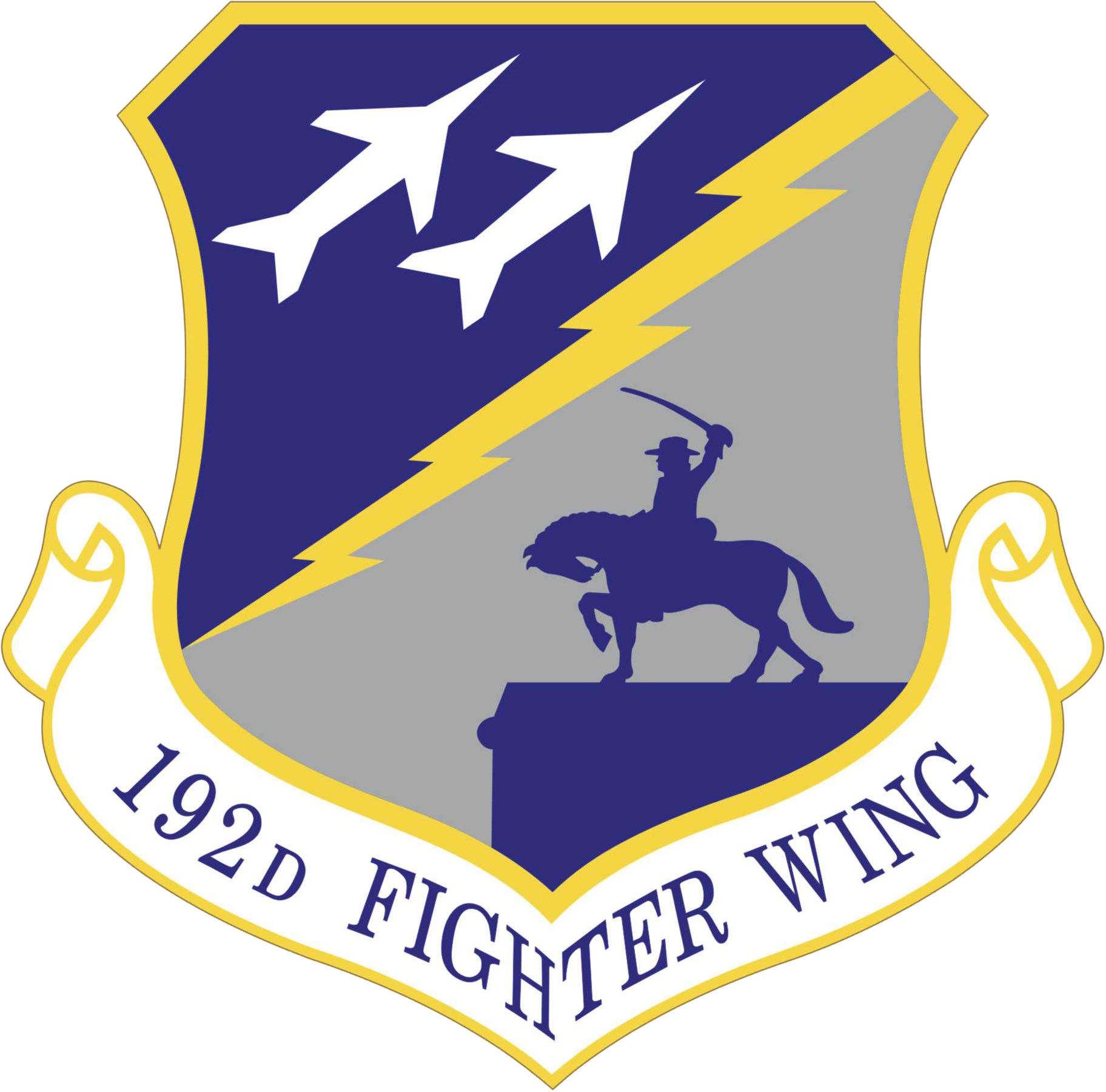
- Emblem of the Virginia Air National Guard (192nd Fighter Wing)

Aircraft flown
- Fighter: F-22A Raptor

The Virginia Air National Guard (VA ANG) is the aerial militia of the Commonwealth of Virginia, United States of America. It is a reserve of the United States Air Force and along with the Virginia Army National Guard an element of the Virginia National Guard of the larger United States National Guard.

As commonwealth militia units, the units in the Virginia Air National Guard are not in the normal United States Air Force chain of command. They are under the jurisdiction of the governor of Virginia through the office of the Virginia Adjutant General unless they are federalized by order of the president of the United States. The Virginia Air National Guard is headquartered in Richmond, and its commander is Brigadier General Catherine M. Jumper.

== Overview ==
Under the "Total Force" concept, Virginia Air National Guard units are considered to be Air Reserve Components (ARC) of the United States Air Force (USAF). Virginia ANG units are trained and equipped by the Air Force and are operationally gained by a major command of the USAF if federalized. In addition, the Virginia Air National Guard forces are assigned to Air Expeditionary Forces and are subject to deployment tasking orders along with their active duty and Air Force Reserve counterparts in their assigned cycle deployment window.

Along with their federal reserve obligations, as commonwealth militia units the elements of the Virginia ANG are subject to being activated by order of the governor to provide protection of life and property, and preserve peace, order and public safety. Commonwealth missions include disaster relief in times of earthquakes, hurricanes, floods and forest fires, search and rescue, protection of vital public services, and support to civil defense.

== Components ==
The Virginia Air National Guard consists of the following major unit:

- 192d Wing

Established 21 June 1947 (as: 149th Fighter Squadron); operates: F-22A Raptor
Stationed at: Joint Base Langley–Eustis, Hampton
Gained by: Air Combat Command
The 192nd is co-located with the active duty 1st Fighter Wing as an associate unit. The 149th Fighter Squadron is the first Air National Guard squadron to fly the F-22 Raptor.

== History ==
In May 1946, the United States Department of Defense reactivated the 328th Fighter Squadron and redesignated it the 149th Fighter Squadron. Previously, the 328th had been organized at Mitchell Field, New York, on 10 October 1942, and saw action in Europe. The newly designated 149th FS was assigned to the Virginia Air National Guard, which earned official recognition from the National Guard Bureau in June 1947.

=== Korean War ===
The unit was called to active federal service on 1 March 1951. This activation temporarily resulted in the dissolution of the Virginia Air National Guard, as members were sent to various places, including for many, duty in the Korean War. The Virginia ANG was reorganized in November 1953 as a B-26 bomber outfit.

=== Cold War ===
In 1957, the unit was redesignated the 149th Fighter Interceptor Squadron and was scheduled to get F-86E Saber jets. However, later that year, the unit became the 149th Tactical Fighter Squadron, and F-84F Thunderstreak fighter-bombers began replacing the B-26.

At the height of the Cold War in 1961, the squadron was federalized as a result of tensions concerning the Berlin Wall. The squadron remained at Richmond in an active-duty status for about a year before being released. Twenty-two Virginia ANG members were sent to Chaumont-Semoutiers Air Base, France, in December 1961 to support the 7180th Tactical Fighter Wing, a deployed unit of the 108th Tactical Fighter Wing. They spent eight months in Europe.

In October 1962, the Virginia ANG unit was redesignated as the 192nd Tactical Fighter Group, with the 149th TFS becoming the group's flying squadron. Other squadrons assigned into the group were the 192nd Headquarters, 192nd Material Squadron (Maintenance), 192nd Combat Support Squadron, and the 192nd USAF Dispensary.

During 1971, the Virginia ANG was assigned the F-105D Thunderchief, a supersonic fighter-bomber that was the backbone of the USAF's fighter element during the Vietnam War. The group's special tasking during the next 10 years included several deployments to Red Flag live-fire exercises in Nevada and a deployment to RAF Lakenheath, United Kingdom, in 1976.

In 1981, the unit transitioned to the A-7D Corsair II. The 10-year A-7 era included several deployments, to Ecuador, Norway, and to Panama, in support of the defense of the Panama Canal. A Virginia contingent competed in Gunsmoke '85, the USAF's tactical fighter competition, and the 192nd was named the world's "Best A-7 unit". The 192nd also earned the General Spruance Safety Award and was recognized as having had the best Operational Readiness Inspection in the Ninth Air Force during 1985. That string of accomplishments helped the 192nd earn its first USAF Outstanding Unit Award, which was presented in 1987.

=== Peacekeeping operations ===
In 1991, the Virginia ANG became the first Air National Guard unit to receive the F-16C/D. The 192nd's designation shortened somewhat during 1992 from 192nd Tactical Fighter Group to 192nd Fighter Group. This change reflected the retirement of the former Tactical Air Command and creation of the multi-role mission of the new Air Combat Command. The unit was initially assigned 24 single-seat F-16C models and two F-16D models. By early 1994, defense cutbacks had reduced the unit's assigned inventory to 18 F-16s, and eventually to only 15 fighter jets.

After the 192nd FG became fully operational with the F-16, it was chosen as the lead unit in a four-state Air National Guard F-16 "rainbow" detachment deployed to Incirlik Air Base, Turkey, to support Operation Provide Comfort II. During that operation between 1 December 1993 and 15 January 1994, ANG pilots patrolled the no-fly zone over northern Iraq to prevent Iraqi forces from inflicting damage on the villages of Kurdish minorities. This was the first time Air National Guard units had been called to active duty to serve in a peacekeeping role in the Middle East, following Iraq's defeat in 1991. The unit returned to Incirlik in February 1996 for another round of patrols over Iraq. During October 1995, the 192nd's designation was again slightly modified to reflect unit restructuring within the Air Force and Air National Guard. This time the unit designation was changed from 192nd Fighter Group to 192nd Fighter Wing.

At the direction of the commander of Air Combat Command, in January 1996 the 192nd became a test regional repair center for F-16 engines. The 18-month assignment called for the 192nd propulsion section to strip and rebuild General Electric F110-GE-100 engines for its own F-16s as well as for F-16s assigned to Pope Air Force Base, North Carolina. With Pope designated to become a composite wing with several types of aircraft, ACC officials sought more efficient and economical ways of providing maintenance for its F-16 engines. By setting up a regional repair center at the 192nd, the Air Force reduced the number of F-16 maintenance people needed in this region, consolidated their training, reduced duplication of resources and equipment, and lowered maintenance costs per flying hour.

In April–May 1999, a number of Virginia ANG munitions personnel deployed to Incirlik Air Base, Turkey, with personnel from the Florida Air National Guard to fill critical munitions slots in maintaining the northern no-fly zone. At the same time, personnel from the 192nd Communications Flight, Military Personnel Flight, Security Forces Squadron, Services Squadron and Civil Engineer Squadron deployed to Al Jaber Air Base, Kuwait, to support U.S. Air Force contingency activities to guard and protect the southern no-fly zone.

In December 2000, 29 members of the 192nd deployed to Southwest Asia and other locations in support of Operation Southern Watch. In addition to Turkey and Kuwait, they were deployed to Prince Sultan Air Base and Eskan Village, Saudi Arabia, Aviano Air Base, Italy, and Qatar.

Also in December 2000, the 192nd was deployed on its first Aerospace Expeditionary Force assignment. A 130-person detachment went to Curaçao in the Netherlands Antilles as part of Operation Coronet Nighthawk, an effort to stop drug smuggling into the United States. Aside from strictly operational matters, the fighter wing also focused on community support, humanitarian assistance and military heritage.

=== War on Terror ===
The pace of activity for the 192nd was ended with the September 11 attacks of 2001. The United States' responses to those attacks, Operation Noble Eagle and Operation Enduring Freedom, dominated the Virginia ANG in the following months. During the attacks on 9/11, two Virginia Air National Guard F-16C fighters were scrambled with live 20mm guns to intercept and recover Attorney General John Ashcroft to the Richmond International Airport and to respond as required to any known hijacked aircraft. Ashcroft ended up landing in DC and the Virginia fighters responded to ATC requests for visual identification of aircraft over the DC area. Eventually, the two fighters landed at Langley AFB and were of the first to be loaded with live missiles and flown in support of the newly created Operation Noble Eagle. More than 400 ANG members were called to active duty for time frames ranging up to two years, marking a period of prolonged intensity at the Air Guard base unmatched since the Berlin call-up of 1961–62.

The Virginia ANG home station in Sandston took on the look of an active-duty air force base. Beginning in mid-September, combat air patrols were flown day and night for 218 consecutive days until mid-April 2002 for a total of 820 operational sorties and 3,515.5 flying hours.

In September–October 2003, in support of Operation Iraqi Freedom, the Virginia ANG deployed more than 300 personnel to an undisclosed base in Southwest Asia.

On 14 January 2004, a milestone was reached as the Propulsion section of the 192nd Maintenance Group completed assembly of the 300th jet engine since production started in 1994. As the year unfolded, an emphasis was placed on new mission requirements, and the future of the Virginia ANG 192nd FW. Guard members were given news about plans to relocate the unit to nearby Langley Air Force Base and the replacement of the F-16 with the F-22A Raptor. For this, the 192nd FW would be integrated with the USAF 1st Fighter Wing. In October 2005, LtCol. Phillip Guy became the first Virginia ANG pilot to transition to Langley AFB and fly the new F-22A in training missions and sorties alongside active duty Air Force pilots stationed there.

The last Unit Training Assembly was held at Sandston in September 2007. Remaining base personnel solemnly attended the 'Stand-down' ceremony in the main hangar and watched as the unit flag was rolled-up by Col. Jay Pearsall and then put away.

On 13 October 2007, the 192nd FW was reactivated in a ceremony held at the 27th Fighter Squadron, Langley AFB. Set-up as a classic 'associate wing' the 192nd FW works directly with the 1st FW yet maintains its own unit identity and command structure. It shares in the support of mission requirements for the F-22A, but does not own any of the aircraft on station.

Members of the Virginia ANG have integrated into support and medical groups, and also into the 480th Intelligence Wing. In October 2007 the 192nd Intelligence Squadron had grown to approximately 100 members.

On 6 January 2009, airmen of the Virginia Air National Guard were deployed to Kadena Air Base piloting 12 F-22As as part of a scheduled rotation of forces, an exercise that attracted significant attention from media, politicians, and civilians in Japan.

== See also ==
- Virginia Defense Force
- Virginia Military Institute
- Virginia Wing Civil Air Patrol
