= 47th Fighter Squadron =

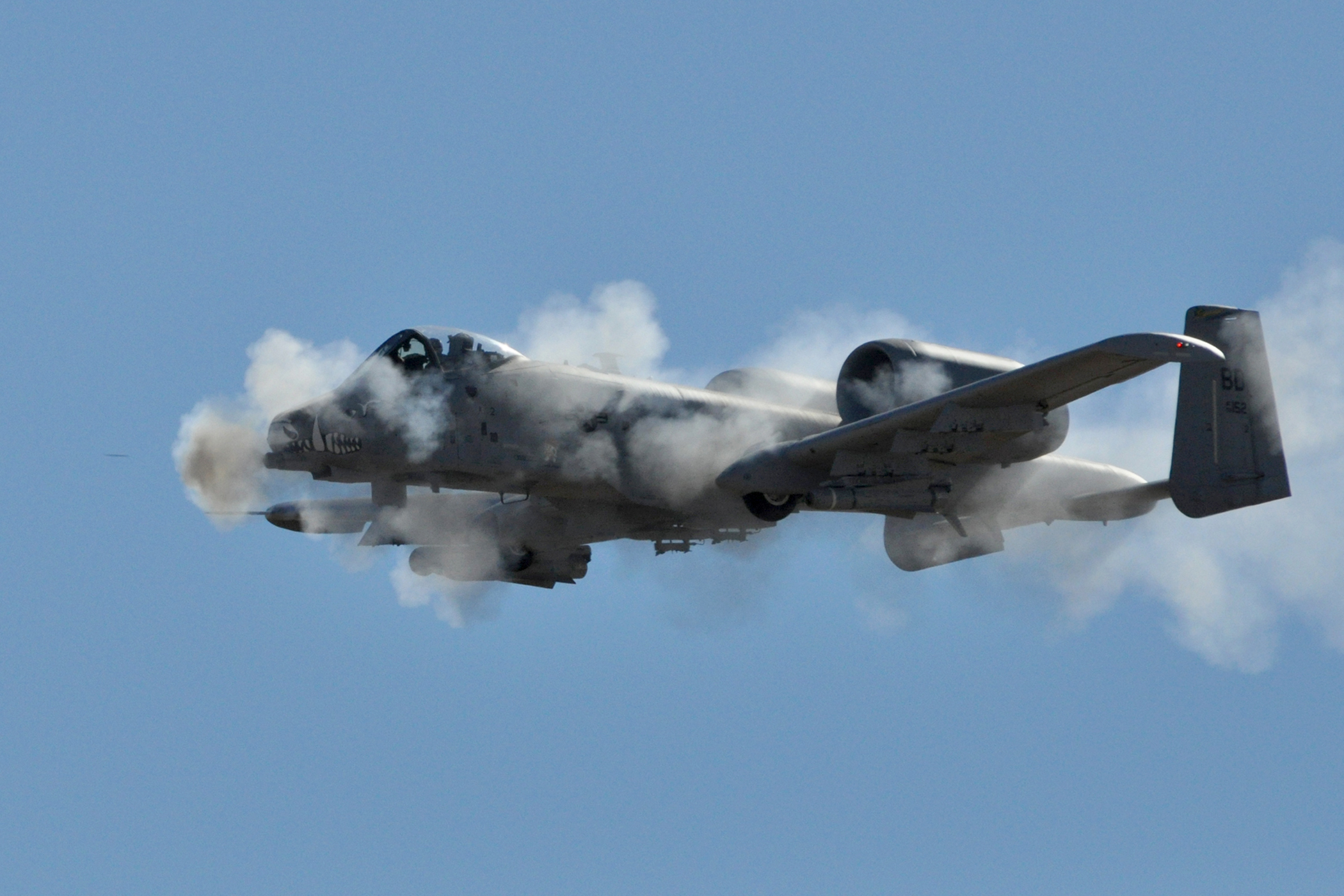
- 47th Fighter Squadron A-10 Thunderbolt II at Hawgsmoke 2010 competition
- Active: 1940–1946; 1952–1960; 1962–1971; 1973–2025
- Country: United States
- Branch: United States Air Force
- Role: Fighter
- Part of: Air Force Reserve Command
- Garrison/HQ: Davis–Monthan Air Force Base
- Nickname: Dogpatchers
- Engagements: World War II; Pacific War; Operation Deny Flight; Operation Decisive Edge; Operation Enduring Freedom
- Decorations: Distinguished Unit Citation; Air Force Outstanding Unit Award with Combat "V" Device; Air Force Outstanding Unit Award

Insignia
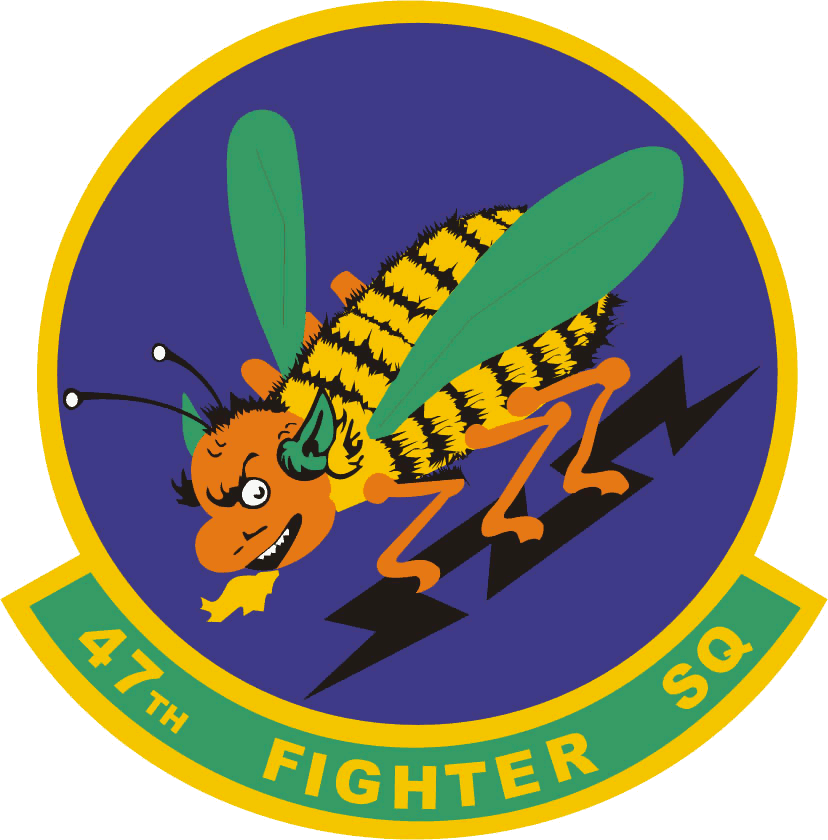
- 47th Fighter Squadron emblem (revised 27 November 2001)

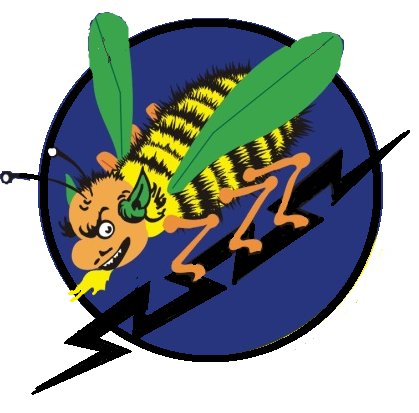
- 47th Fighter Squadron emblem (approved 19 September 1944)

The 47th Fighter Squadron is an inactive Air Force Reserve Command unit that was based at Davis–Monthan Air Force Base, Arizona, where it flew Fairchild Republic A-10 Thunderbolt II aircraft and was assigned to the 924 Fighter Group.

The squadron was first activated in 1940, as the United States expanded its military forces prior to World War II, as the 47th Pursuit Squadron. The squadron formed part of the air defenses of the Hawaiian Islands, and suffered heavy losses in the attack on Pearl Harbor. It served in Hawaii and the Pacific for the remainder of the war, earning a Distinguished Unit Citation for long-range fighter missions over Japan in 1945. It returned to Hawaii in 1946 and was inactivated.

The squadron was activated again as the 47th Fighter-Interceptor Squadron in 1952, when it replaced an Air National Guard unit that had been mobilized for the Korean War and was being returned to state control. It continued in the air defense role until inactivating in 1960. It was activated again in 1962 as the 47th Tactical Fighter Squadron and became one of the first McDonnell F-4 Phantom II fighter units, flying the Phantom until 1971, and deploying elements to Southeast Asia. It was activated again in the Reserve in 1973 and has served as an Air Force Reserve fighter squadron.

The squadron was inactivated on 6 September 2025 as part of the wider drawdown of the USAF's A-10 fleet.

== Mission ==
The 47th conducted advanced A-10 Thunderbolt II training.

== History ==
=== World War II ===
The 47th Fighter Squadron was activated on 1 December 1940, as the 47th Pursuit Squadron, one of three squadrons assigned to the 15th Pursuit Group at Wheeler Field, territory of Hawaii. The squadron also flew missions from Hawaiian stations of Bellows Field, Haleiwa Fighter Strip and Mokuleia Field, as well as Barking Sands Army Air Field.

The 47th Pursuit Squadron participated in numerous campaigns from 1940 to 1945, flying P-10, Boeing P-26 Peashooter, Curtiss P-36 Hawk, Republic P-47 Thunderbolt, and North American P-51 Mustang aircraft. The squadron was credited with shooting down eight Japanese aircraft on 7 December 1941 and by the end of the war was credited with killing hundreds of enemy aircraft before being inactivated on 15 October 1946, at Wheeler Field.

=== Air Defense Command ===
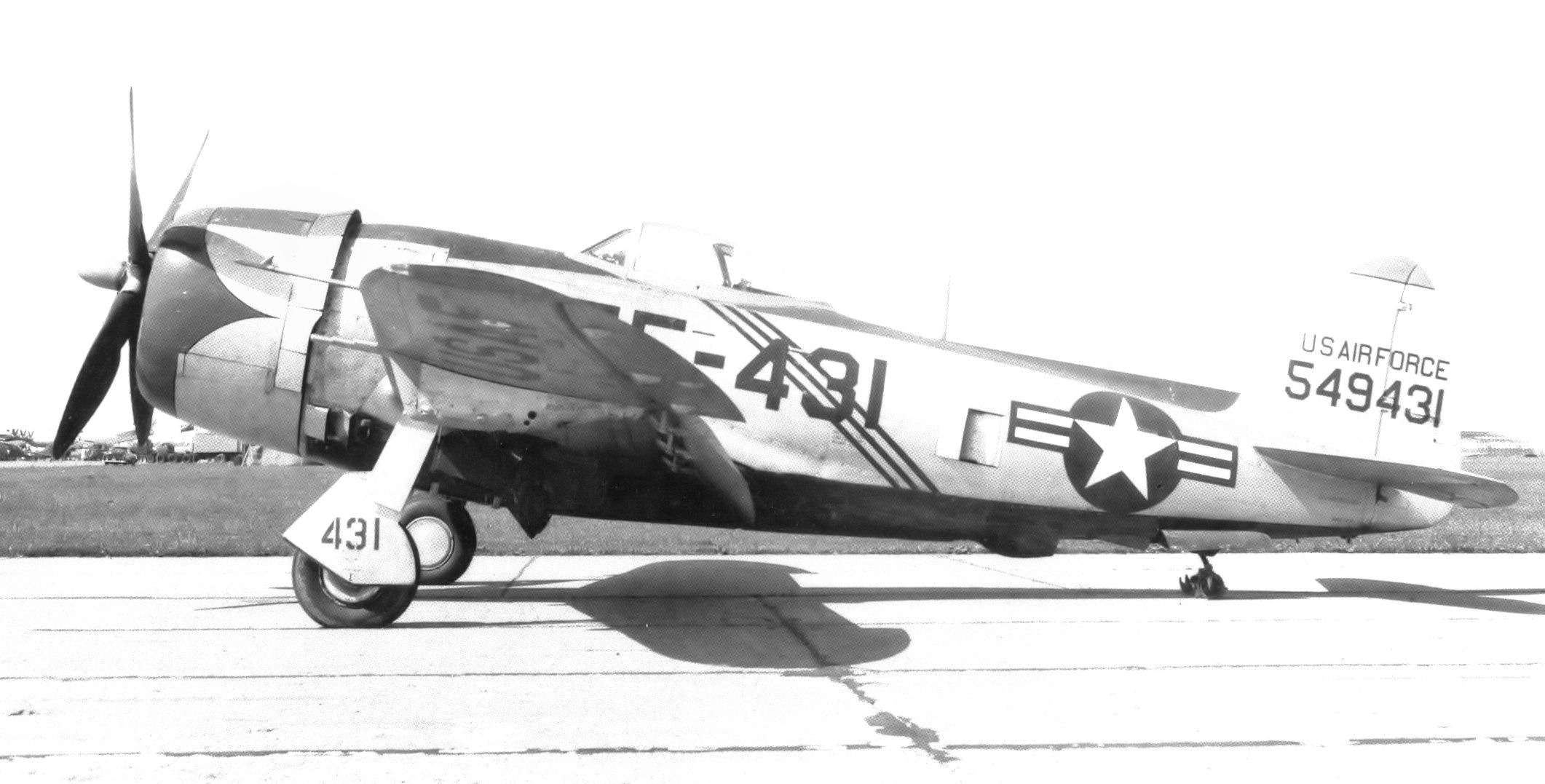
47th Fighter-Interceptor Squadron Republic F-47D-40-RA Thunderbolt, AF Ser. No. 45-49431, Niagara Falls, NY, 1952

On 1 December 1952, the 47th was redesignated the 47th Fighter-Interceptor Squadron and was activated at Niagara Falls Municipal Airport, New York, where it assumed the mission, personnel and equipment of the 136th Fighter-Interceptor Squadron, a federalized New York Air National Guard unit that was returned to state control. Assigned to the 4708th Defense Wing under Air Defense Command, the squadron flew F-47 aircraft. In February 1953 the 47th was reassigned to the 518th Air Defense Group. It upgraded to Mighty Mouse rocket armed and airborne intercept radar equipped North American F-86D Sabres in September 1953. In 1957 the squadron began re-equipping with the North American F-86L Sabre, an improved version of the F-86D which incorporated data link to communicate directly with the Semi Automatic Ground Environment, computer-controlled direction system for intercepts. The service of the F-86L was destined to be quite brief, since by the time the last F-86L conversion was delivered, the type was already being phased out in favor of supersonic interceptors. In May 1958 the Sabres were replaced by Convair F-102 Delta Daggers. On 1 July 1960, the 47th was again inactivated.

=== Tactical Air Command ===
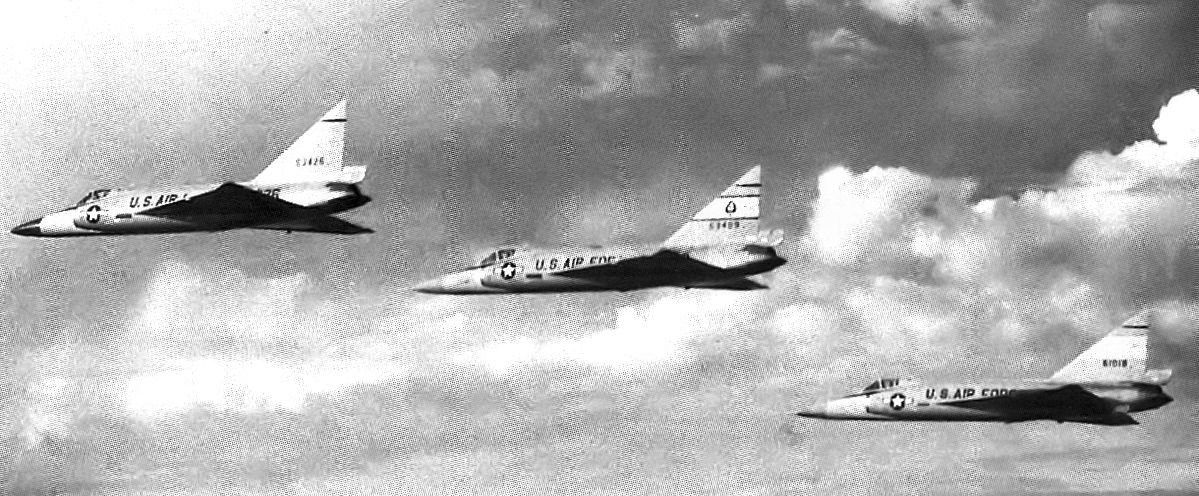
47th Fighter-Interceptor Squadron three-ship F-102 formation, about 1959

In the summer of 1962, the squadron was reactivated as the 47th Tactical Fighter Squadron and became part of the Tactical Air Command. Assigned to the 15th Tactical Fighter Wing at MacDill Air Force Base, Florida, the 47th flew Republic F-84F Thunderstreak and McDonnell F-4 Phantom II aircraft.

In July 1965, the 47th deployed to Ubon Royal Thai Air Force Base, Thailand, and compiled 1,743 combat missions over Southeast Asia. The squadron returned to MacDill on 27 November 1965, and converted from a training mission to a combat training mission before being inactivated on 2 July 1971.

On 1 October 1973 the squadron was reactivated as the 47th Tactical Fighter Squadron, under the 917th Tactical Fighter Group at Barksdale Air Force Base, Louisiana. The 47th flew Cessna A-37 Dragonfly aircraft until 1 October 1980, when A-37s were phased out and replaced with the Fairchild Republic A-10 Thunderbolt II.

=== Air Force Reserve operations ===
In December 1993, August 1994, and May 1995, the squadron deployed to Aviano Air Base, Italy, to support Operation Deny Flight, the United Nations no-fly zone over Bosnia and Herzegovina. In May 1996 the squadron deployed for the fourth time to Aviano, this time under the auspices of Operation Decisive Edge. The end result was a total of 501 sorties flown by the 47th from 1993 to 1996 as part of the NATO peacekeeping effort.

On 7 October 1996, the 47th's mission changed from combat to A-10 pilot training. Since that time they have participated in Operation Century Eagle 1999 & 2001, Saguaro Patriot 2001, Patriot Claw 2001 and Patriot Buccaneer 2002. During the first tactical and conventional gunnery competition open to A-10s, Hawgsmoke 2000, and the 47th took First Place for Top Hawgsmoke Tactical Unit, Top Overall Pilot and Top Overall Tactical Pilot. Then during the next Hawgsmoke competition in 2002, they won top A-10 Squadron in the world.

The school graduated approximately 45 active-duty, Air National Guard and Air Force Reserve students per year.

In June 2003, the squadron deployed to Combat Readiness Training Center, Gulfport, Mississippi for Operation Patriot Pursuit. In April 2004, the 47th hosted Hawgsmoke 2004 at the England Air Park (former England AFB), Louisiana. There were 18 A-10 teams from all over the world deployed to participate in the biennial A-10 bombing and tactical gunnery competition. The 47th deployed to MacDill Air Force Base, Florida for Operation Patriot Gator the end of July through the first of August 2004. In 2005, the 47th deployed to McChord Air Force Base, Washington, for Operation Patriot Lightning, a close air support training exercise in conjunction with the Army National Guard.

In 2006 pursuant to a Base Realignment and Closure decision, the 47th gained eight A-10 aircraft and a number of full-time and part-time positions. In March the 47 FS won third overall out of 17 teams in Hawgsmoke 2006 at Davis–Monthan Air Force Base, Arizona. Also in March, they participated in Operation Atlantic Strike III, a joint training exercise held at Avon Park Air Force Range, Florida with the squadron operating from nearby MacDill AFB.

As a training unit augmenting the active duty A-10 Formal Training Unit (FTU) squadron at Davis-Monthan AFB, the 47th graduated about 45 active-duty, Air National Guard and Air Force Reserve students per year.

1 October 2011, the 47th Fighter Squadron converted from a training unit to a combat coded unit. January 2012, the 917 Wing was inactivated. The wing's B-52 squadron, the 93d Bombardment Squadron, was assigned to the 307th Bombardment Wing and the 47th was assigned to the 917th Fighter Group, which became part of the 442d Fighter Wing at Whiteman Air Force Base, MO.

In September 2013, the squadron relocated to Davis-Monthan AFB.

In September 2024, the 47th Fighter Squadron won the biennial Hawgsmoke bombing, missile, and tactical gunnery competition.

Following the 924th Fighter Group's inactivation in September 2025, the 47th Fighter Squadron is due to reactivate as an F-35 squadron at a future date.

== Lineage ==
- Constituted as the 47th Pursuit Squadron (Fighter) on 22 November 1940

Activated on 1 December 1940
Redesignated: 47th Pursuit Squadron (Interceptor) on 12 February 1942
Redesignated: 47th Fighter Squadron on 15 May 1942
Redesignated: 47th Fighter Squadron, Single Engine on 20 August 1944
Inactivated on 15 October 1946

- Redesignated 47th Fighter-Interceptor Squadron on 10 October 1952

Activated on 1 December 1952
Discontinued on 1 July 1960

- Redesignated 47th Tactical Fighter Squadron on 17 April 1962

Organized on 1 July 1962
Inactivated on 1 July 1971

- Activated in the Reserve on 1 October 1973

Redesignated 47th Fighter Squadron on 1 February 1992

=== Assignments ===
- 15th Pursuit Group (later 15th Fighter Group), 1 December 1940 – 15 October 1946
- 4708th Defense Wing, 1 December 1952
- 518th Air Defense Group, 16 February 1953
- 15th Fighter Group, 18 August 1955 – 1 July 1960
- Tactical Air Command, 17 April 1962 (not organized)
- 15th Tactical Fighter Wing, 1 July 1962 (attached to 2d Air Division 25 July – 22 November 1965)
- 1st Tactical Fighter Wing, 1 October 1970 – 1 July 1971
- 917th Tactical Fighter Group (later 917th Tactical Fighter Wing; 917th Fighter Wing), 1 October 1973
- 917th Operations Group, 1 August 1992
- 917th Fighter Group, 1 January 2011 – 26 September 2013
- 924 Fighter Group 27 September 2013 – 6 September 2025

=== Stations ===
- Wheeler Field, Hawaii, 1 December 1940
- Bellows Field, Hawaii, 22 February 1942
- Haleiwa Field, Hawaii, 25 March 1942
- Barking Sands Army Air Field, Hawaii, 29 July 1943
- Mokuleia Field, Hawaii, 8 November 1943
- Bellows Field, Hawaii, 8 June 1944 – 27 January 1945)
- South Field (Iwo Jima), 27 February 1945
- Bellows Field, Hawaii, 25 November 1945
- Wheeler Field, Hawaii Territory, 9 February – 15 October 1946
- Niagara Falls Municipal Airport, New York 1 December 1952 – 1 July 1960)
- MacDill Air Force Base, Florida, 1 July 1962 – 1 July 1971 (deployed to Ubon Royal Thai Air Force Base, Thailand 25 July – 22 November 1965)
- Barksdale Air Force Base, Louisiana, 1 October 1973
- Davis–Monthan Air Force Base, Arizona, 27 September 2013 – 6 September 2025

=== Aircraft operated ===
- Boeing P-26 Peashooter (1941)
- Curtiss P-40 Warhawk (1941–1943)
- Curtiss P-36 Hawk (1941–1943)
- Republic P-47 (later F-47) Thunderbolt (1943–1945) (1952–1953
- North American P-51 Mustang (1944–1946)
- North American F-86D Sabre (1954–1957)
- North American F-86L Sabre (1957–1958)
- North American F-102 Delta Dagger (1958–1960)
- Republic F-84F Thunderstreak (1962–1964)
- McDonnell F-4 Phantom II (1964–1971)
- Cessna A-37 Dragonfly (1973–1980)
- Republic Fairchild A-10 Thunderbolt II (1980–2025)
