= Haleiwa Fighter Strip =

Military airfield on Oahu, Hawaii

Haleiwa Fighter Strip
- Part of Seventh Air Force
- Haleʻiwa, Oahu, Hawaii
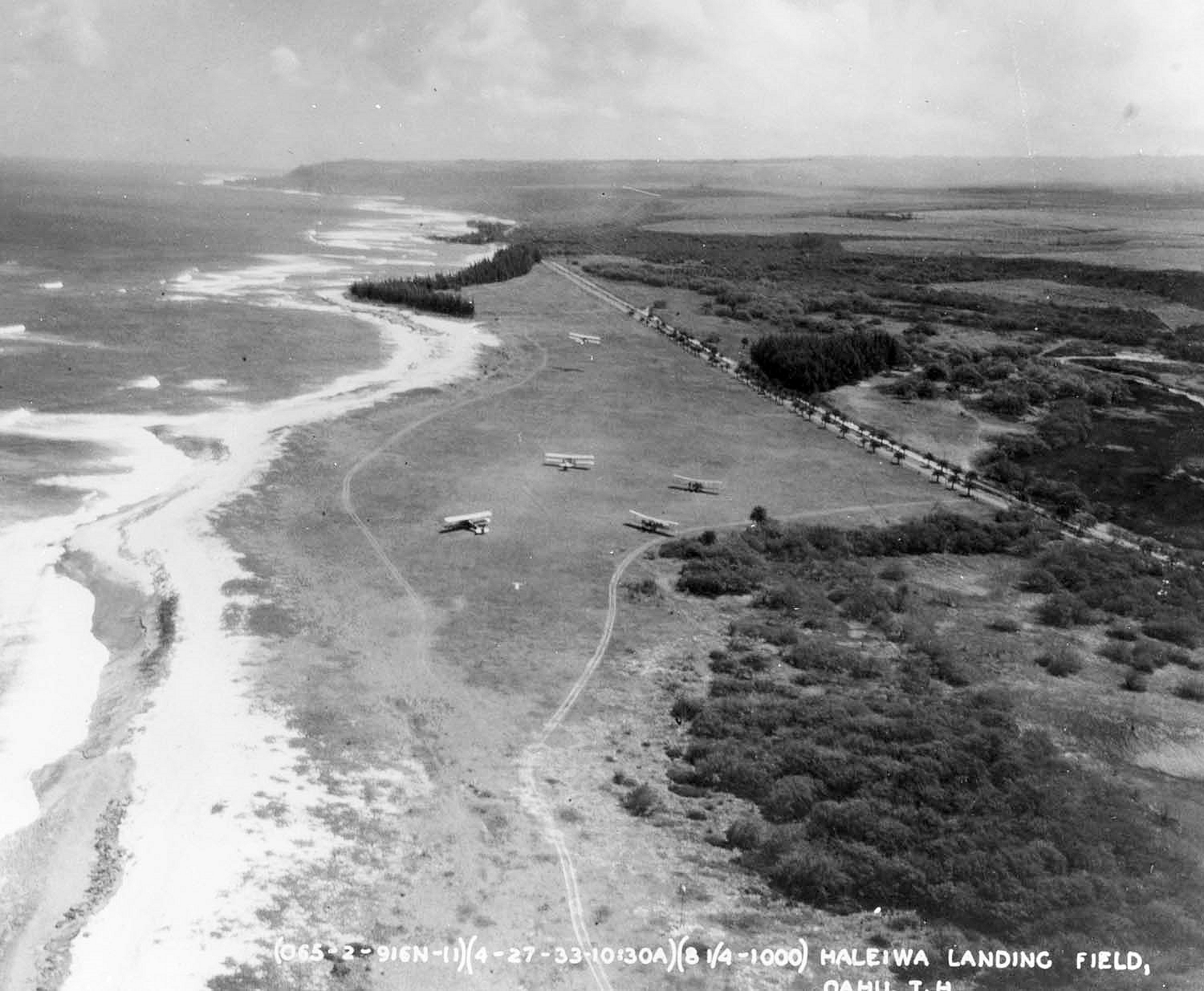
- Haleiwa Fighter Strip 1933

Site information
- Type: Military airfield
- Controlled by: United States Army Air Corps

Location
- Coordinates: 21°36′16″N 158°6′8″W

Haleiwa Fighter Strip was a military airfield on Oahu, Hawaii. It was used as part of the island's defense in World War II.

== History ==
This obscure former military strip became famous during the December 7, 1941 attack on Pearl Harbor.

Originally used as an emergency landing field for fighter aircraft, in 1941 Haleiwa Field had only an unpaved landing strip and very austere conditions. Haleiwa Field was mainly used to simulate real battle conditions for gunnery training. Those on temporary duty there had to bring their own tents and equipment. On 26 January 1945 the 14th Naval Construction Battalion completed the airfield with a paved runway and it became a busy reliever base for fighter aircraft patrolling the islands. A World War II era photo depicted a Bell P-39 taxiing past a temporary wooden control tower and another wooden building at Haleiwa. Two of the B-17s of the 88th RS (41–2429, 41–2430) arriving at Hawaii during the attack landed there.

=== Pearl Harbor Attack ===
On December 7 the Japanese heavily strafed the aircraft at Wheeler Field and few were able to get airborne to fend them off. Haleiwa was an auxiliary field to Wheeler and contained a collection of aircraft temporarily assigned to the field including aircraft from the 47th Fighter Squadron. A total of eight Curtiss P-40 Warhawk and 2 Curtiss P-36 Mohawk pursuit planes were at the field on the morning of December 7.

2nd Lt. George S. Welch and 2nd Lt. Kenneth M. Taylor, both P-40 pilots, were at Wheeler when the attack began. They had previously flown their P-40B fighters over to the small airfield at Haleiwa as part of a plan to disperse the squadron's planes away from Wheeler. Not waiting for instructions the pilots called ahead to Haleiwa and had both their fighters fueled, armed and warmed up. Both men raced in their cars to Haleiwa Field completing the 16-mile trip in about 15 minutes. With their P-40s, now warmed up and ready, they jumped into their cockpits. The crew chiefs informed them that they should disperse their planes. "The hell with that", said Welch. Ignoring the usual pre-takeoff checklists the aircraft took off down the narrow airstrip.

Once in the air they spotted a large number of aircraft in the direction of Ewa and Pearl Harbor. Only then did they realize what they were up against. "There were between 200 and 300 Japanese aircraft," said Taylor; "there were just two of us!" The two P-40s engaged the aircraft attacking Ewa Mooring Mast and shot down five Japanese planes. They then returned to Wheeler to replenish their ammunition. While there, another wave of dive bombers appeared and Lt. Taylor raced back into the air. His P-40's cockpit was damaged as a Japanese plane chased him. Lt. Welch was able to down the plane following him and they both returned to Wheeler. Lt. Welch was credited with a total of four Japanese planes shot down and Lt. Taylor downed two. Just as suddenly as it began, the sky was empty of Japanese aircraft. Taylor and Welch were both awarded the Distinguished Service Cross. Welch and Taylor's dramatic ride and takeoff were depicted in the 1970 film Tora! Tora! Tora!

A total of nine Japanese aircraft were shot down by pilots from the Haleiwa field during the Pearl Harbor attack, four by 2nd Lt. Welch and two by 2nd Lt. Taylor, who flew P-40B Tomahawks equipped with twin .50 caliber machine guns. Flying P-36A gunnery trainers stripped of their .50 caliber machine gun and equipped only with a single .30 caliber machine gun to be used for target training, 1st Lieutenant Lewis M. Sanders was credited with shooting down one of the attacking Japanese aircraft, while 2nd Lieutenants Harry W. Brown and Phillip M. Rasmussen were each being credited with shooting down the remaining two attacking aircraft.

All five pilots were later awarded the Distinguished Flying Cross (DFC) for their bravery and valor during the attack.

== Postwar use ==
After the war Haleiwa Fighter Strip was reused as a civilian airport. It was apparently abandoned between 1947 and 1961. Little of Haleiwa Field remains today, although the area is not completely abandoned. The remains of the single runway that was paved during World War II can still be seen but the tarmac is severely compromised by weed growth. The area is used as a motion picture location for various TV shows and movies. Homeless squatters have occupied camps in the heavily overgrown areas. At the north end of the runway still stands the foundation of the control tower and concrete slabs from building foundations.

The land, called Puaʻena Point, remains undeveloped and is owned by Kamehameha Schools. Sometimes called "Police Beach", there was a proposal for development in 2000. It is marked on maps as Puaʻena Beach Park, but not easily accessible. An ancient surfing area around the point, for experts, is accessed from Haleiwa Beach Park off of Kamehameha Highway, Hawaii Route 83.

== See also ==
- Hawaii World War II Army Airfields
