= Atlantic Strike =

Atlantic Strike was a periodic series of combined, joint exercises conducted in the early 2000s under the auspices of the U.S. Air Force's Air Combat Command and, until its disestablishment, U.S. Joint Forces Command's Joint Fires Integration and Interoperability Team. The exercise series focused on close air support (CAS) functions where ground controllers direct air strikes on moving and stationary ground targets.

The exercise was primarily conducted on the Avon Park Air Force Range in central Florida. The 2010 exercise was conducted in September and included aircraft and ground teams from the U.S. Army, U.S. Navy, U.S. Air Force and U.S. Marine Corps as well as soldiers from Canada and Slovenia. Actual and simulated air strikes by B-52 and B-1 bomber, A-10 close air support attack, F-16 fighter, and carrier-based and shore-based F/A-18 strike fighter aircraft, as well as attack helicopters controlled by both ground-based JTACs (Joint Terminal Attack Controllers) and E-8 Joint STARS aircraft were conducted.

The 2011 exercise was also conducted at Avon Park Air Force Range, in September, with Danish coalition forces, Air Force JTACs and U.S. Marine Corps elements.
