= Hawgsmoke =

United States Air Force competition

Hawgsmoke is a biennial United States Air Force (USAF) bombing, missile, and tactical gunnery competition for A-10 Thunderbolt II units. It is hosted by the winners of the previous competition and provides both skills competition and an opportunity to share in the camaraderie and fellowship within the A-10 community.

== Operations ==
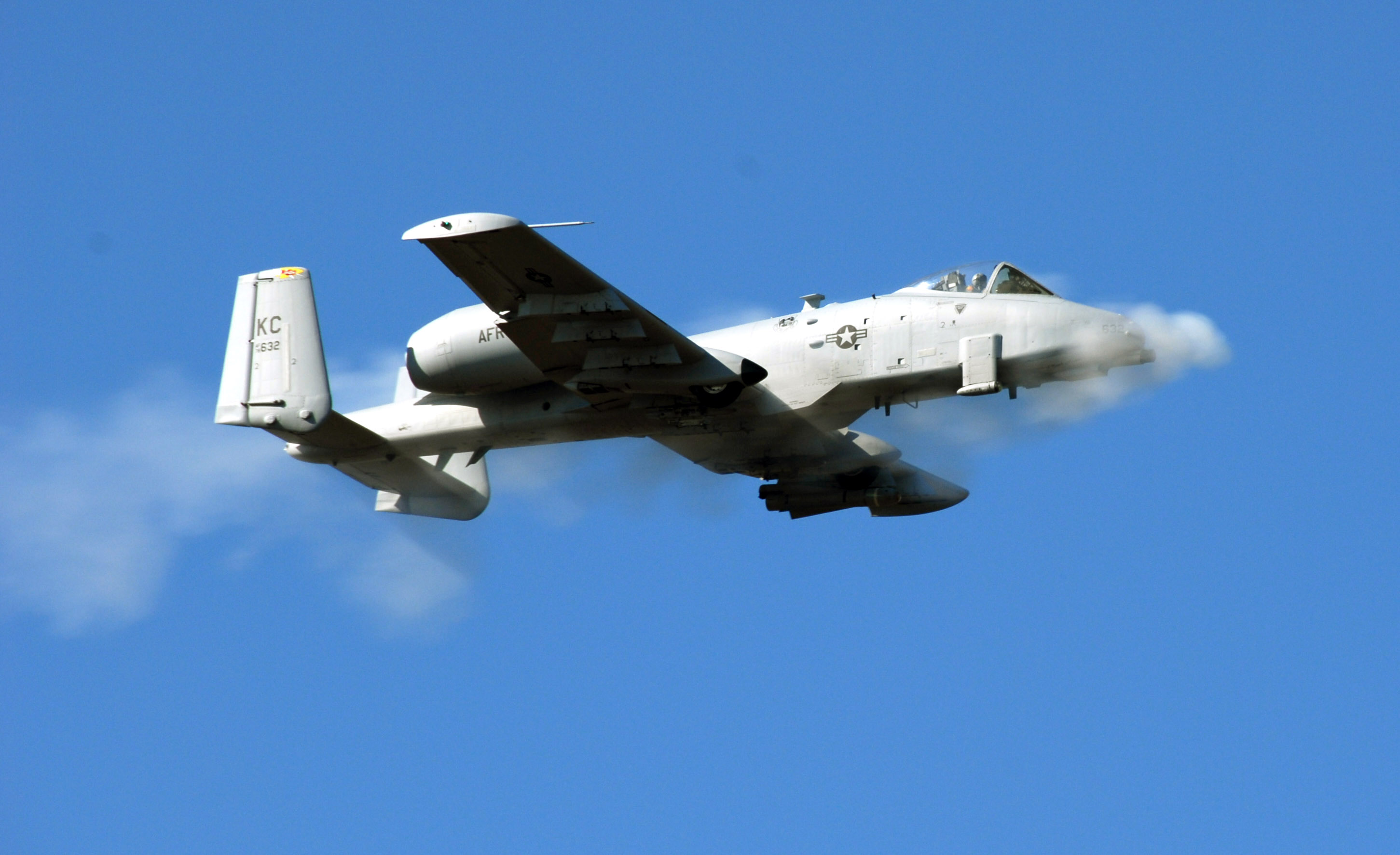
An A-10 Thunderbolt II conducts a strafing run during Hawgsmoke 2008

=== Remembering the fallen ===
Hawgsmoke opens with a remembrance ceremony for fallen comrades. Following the reading of the names of all fallen A-10 pilots, a missing-man formation flies overhead. At the conclusion, the participants drink a shot of whiskey then smash the shot glasses, in honor and remembrance of old friends and colleagues.

=== Competition ===
The competition itself takes place over two days and includes team and individual scoring of strafing, high-altitude dive-bombing, 30-degree dive-bombing, low-angle high-delivery, Maverick missile precision, and team tactics.

== History ==
Hawgsmoke grew out of the discontinued "Gunsmoke" Air Force Worldwide Gunnery Competition. Gunsmoke had been the USAF's air-to-ground gunnery and bombing competition involving multiple airframes, first held in 1949 and then biennially (except for 1963–1980) from 1954 to 1995 at Nellis Air Force Base.

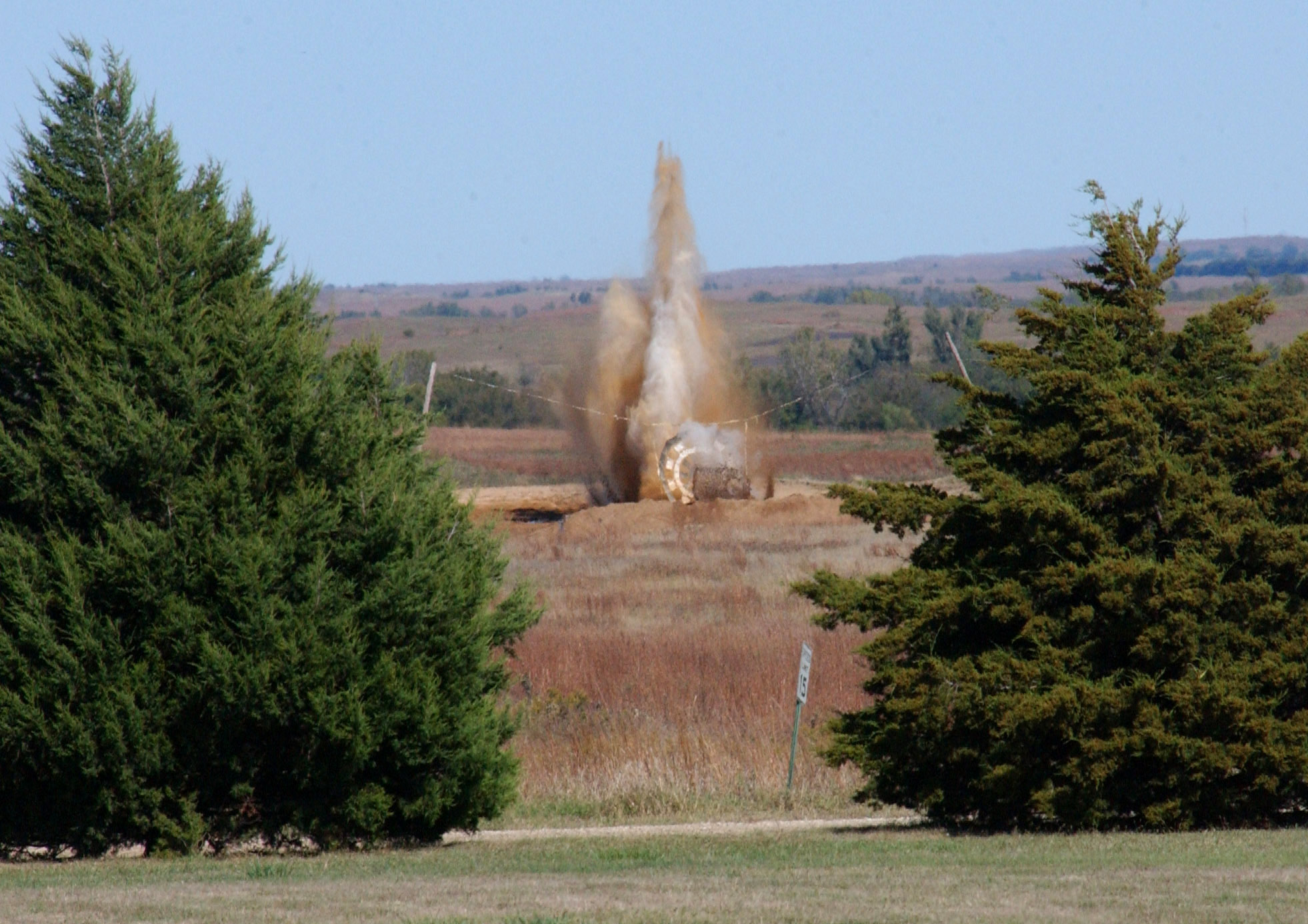
30 mm bullet impact during Hawgsmoke 2008

Colonel Cliff Latta of the 172d Fighter Squadron is credited with initiating the first Hawgsmoke competition at the Alpena Combat Readiness Training Center, Michigan which was hosted by the Michigan Air National Guard's 172d FS from Battle Creek Air National Guard Base. A-10 units from around the world sent four aircraft and associated crew to compete in ground attack and target destruction events. The 118th Fighter Squadron from the Connecticut Air National Guard won the first event and in turn hosted Hawgsmoke 2002, at Fort Drum, New York.

In 2002 17 teams and 62 aircraft competed. The overall winner was the four-member team from the 47th Fighter Squadron from Barksdale Air Force Base, Louisiana. Hawgsmoke 2002 emphasized target acquisition and focused on accurately dropping practice bombs, firing the AGM-65 Maverick missile, and strafing proficiency with the 30 mm GAU-8 Gatling gun.

Hawgsmoke 2004 was hosted by the 47th FS and held at England Air Park, Louisiana. The competition grew to include 18 teams and more than 70 aircraft. Weather conditions forced the cancellation of the competition events and consequently the event became known as "Hawgwash" 2004.

As there was no winner in 2004 the 355th Fighter Wing was selected to host the 2006 event. It was held 22–25 March at Davis Monthan Air Force Base, Arizona. Hawgsmoke 2006 coincided the 30th Anniversary of the A-10; consequently, over 140 aircraft flew in to take part. The 303d Fighter Squadron from Whiteman Air Force Base, Missouri emerged the winner.

October 14 to 18, 2008, the 303d hosted Hawgsmoke 2008 at Salina Airport, Kansas. The location was chosen because of its location near the Smoky Hill Range, Kansas and the ample ramp space. The Idaho Air National Guard's 190th Fighter Squadron based at Gowen Air National Guard Base, Boise, Idaho, won the prize for Top Team.

Hawgsmoke 2010 was held between 13–15 October 2010, again at Gowen ANGB. The home-based 190th FS won Top Team in the competition for the second time in a row. The 190th won a second prize when Maj. Scott Downey was named top pilot at Hawgsmoke 2010.

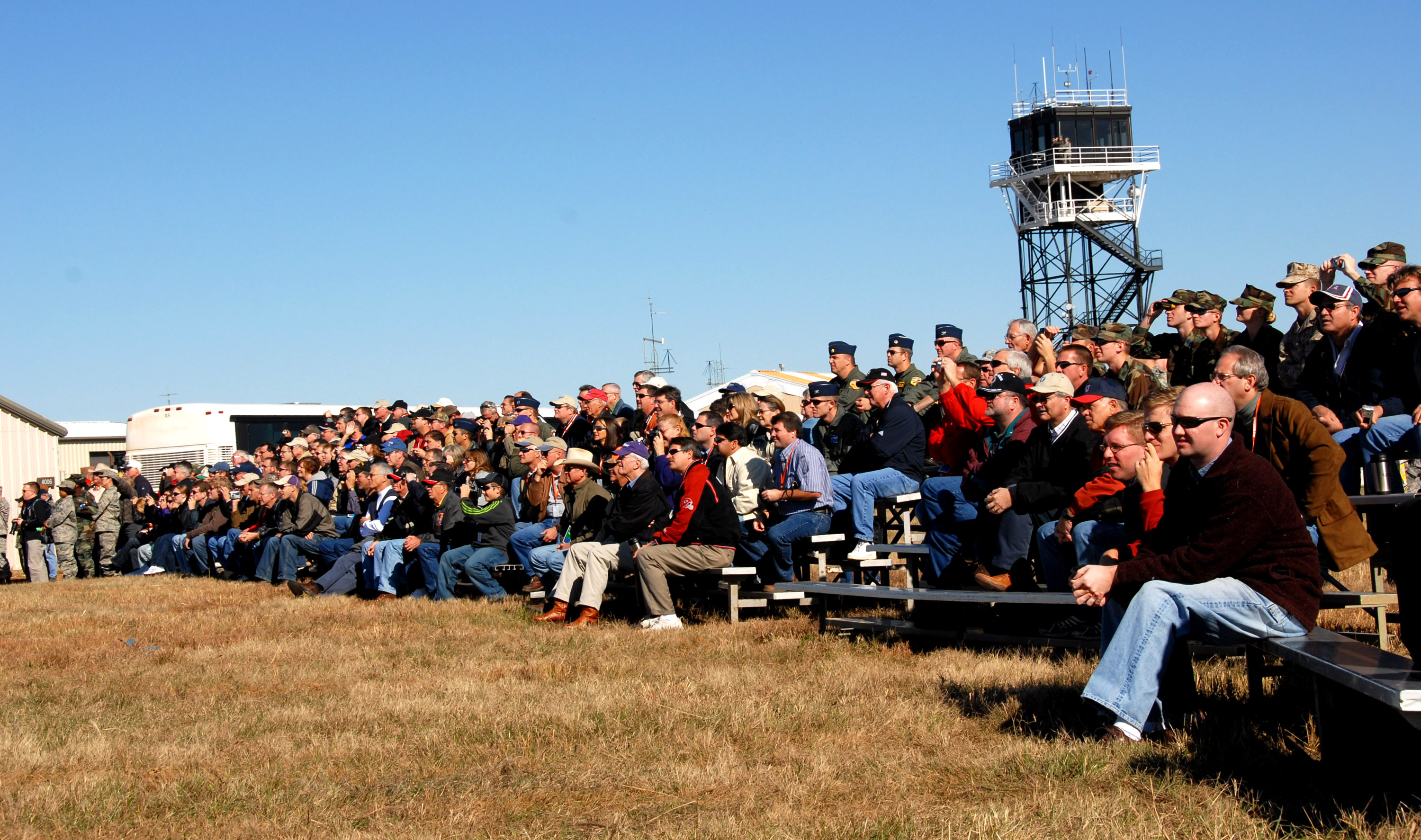
Spectators watching Hawgsmoke 2008

The 355th Fighter Wing hosted Hawgsmoke 2012, between 15–17 August 2012 at Davis Monthan Air Force Base, Arizona and utilized the Barry M. Goldwater Range. Davis Monthan's resident 357th Fighter Squadron won the prestigious Al “Mud” Moore Trophy for Top Overall A-10 unit.

Hawgsmoke 2014 was held again at Davis Monthan AFB, with 355 FW hosting the event between 9–12 July 2012. The 14 A-10 units made extensive use of the Barry M. Goldwater Range during the competition. The 47th Fighter Squadron, an Air Force Reserve Command unit based at Davis-Monthan was awarded the Top Overall A-10 unit.

13 A-10 teams gathered to compete at Hawgsmoke 2016, once again taking place at Davis Monthan. Running from 1–3 June 2016, pilots expended their ordnance over the vast Barry M. Goldwater Range. Davis Monthan's 47th FS was again named Top Overall A-10 unit. Capt. David "Gnome" Knighton of the 47th FS won the top pilot trophy at Hawgsmoke 2016.

Hawgsmoke 2018 took place from 17 to 20 October 2018 at Whiteman AFB. The Cannon Range located near Laquey, Missouri, was used for the competition. 74th Fighter Squadron from Moody AFB, Georgia won the prize for Top A-10 Unit. The 74th also won Top Tactical and Top Conventional team awards.

Hawgsmoke 2020 was due to be hosted by the 74th FS at Moody AFB, but took place from 14 to 17 April 2021 due to the COVID-19 pandemic.

The 190th FS outperformed twelve other A-10 units to win Hawgsmoke 2021 after winning the Top Overall Team Award, Top Overall Flying Team, Top Tactical Team & Top BSA award. Other awards were: Individual Top Gun Overall, Captain Taylor ‘Pistol’ Price, 104th FS; Individual Top Gun Dive Bomb, Lieutenant Colonel Aaron ‘Puff’ Palan, 358th FS; Individual Top Gun Low Bomb, Captain Taylor ‘Pistol’ Price; Individual Top Gun Strafe, Captain Taylor ‘Petrie’ Bye, 75th FS; Weapons Load Competition, Staff Sergeant Riley McIrvin, Airman First Class Maria Bermudez and Senior Airman Najee King, 354th Aircraft Maintenance Unit; Marshalling Award, 354th AMU, Airman First Class Derek Delosh; & Overall Maintenance Award, 104th AMU.

Hawgsmoke 2022 was held between 6–9 September 2022 at Gowen ANGB. The home-based 190 FS won the competition for a fourth time, beating 14 active duty, Air National Guard, and Air Force Reserve units.

Hawgsmoke 2024 was held at Davis Monthan AFB, between 11–15 September 2024. The home-based 47th Fighter Squadron, nicknamed the “Termites” emerged victorious after winning; top conventional bombing team, top conventional strafe team, top tactical team and the top overall team.

During Hawgsmoke 2024, an inactivation ceremony was held at Davis Monthan AFB for the 354th Fighter Squadron.

== Categories ==
- 45-Degree High Altitude Dive Bomb
- 30-Degree Dive Bomb, HARS (Heading and Altitude Reference System; degraded delivery)
- 10-Degree Low Angle, High Drag Pop-up
- Long-Range Strafe
- Low Angle Strafe
- Top Conventional Team (Maj. Jeff "Burger" Watterberg Trophy)
- Top Tactical Team (Capt Steve "Syph" Phillis Trophy)
- Top Overall Pilot (Lt. Col. Robert "Muck" Brown Trophy)
- Top Overall Team (Col. Al "Mud" Moore Trophy)

== List of winners ==
- 2000 – 118th Fighter Squadron
- 2002 – 47th Fighter Squadron
- 2004 – None
- 2006 - 303d Fighter Squadron
- 2008 - 190th Fighter Squadron
- 2010 - 190th Fighter Squadron
- 2012 - 357th Fighter Squadron
- 2014 - 47th Fighter Squadron
- 2016 - 47th Fighter Squadron
- 2018 - 74th Fighter Squadron
- 2020 – None
- 2021 - 190th Fighter Squadron
- 2022 - 190th Fighter Squadron
- 2024 - 47th Fighter Squadron

== 2008 participants ==
- 25th Fighter Squadron
- 45th Fighter Squadron
- 47th Fighter Squadron
- 66th Weapons Squadron
- 74th Fighter Squadron
- 75th Fighter Squadron
- 81st Fighter Squadron
- 103d Fighter Squadron
- 104th Fighter Squadron
- 172d Fighter Squadron
- 190th Fighter Squadron
- 303d Fighter Squadron
- 354th Fighter Squadron
- 357th Fighter Squadron
- 358th Fighter Squadron
- 422d Test & Evaluation Squadron
