= Gunsmoke (aerial gunnery competition) =

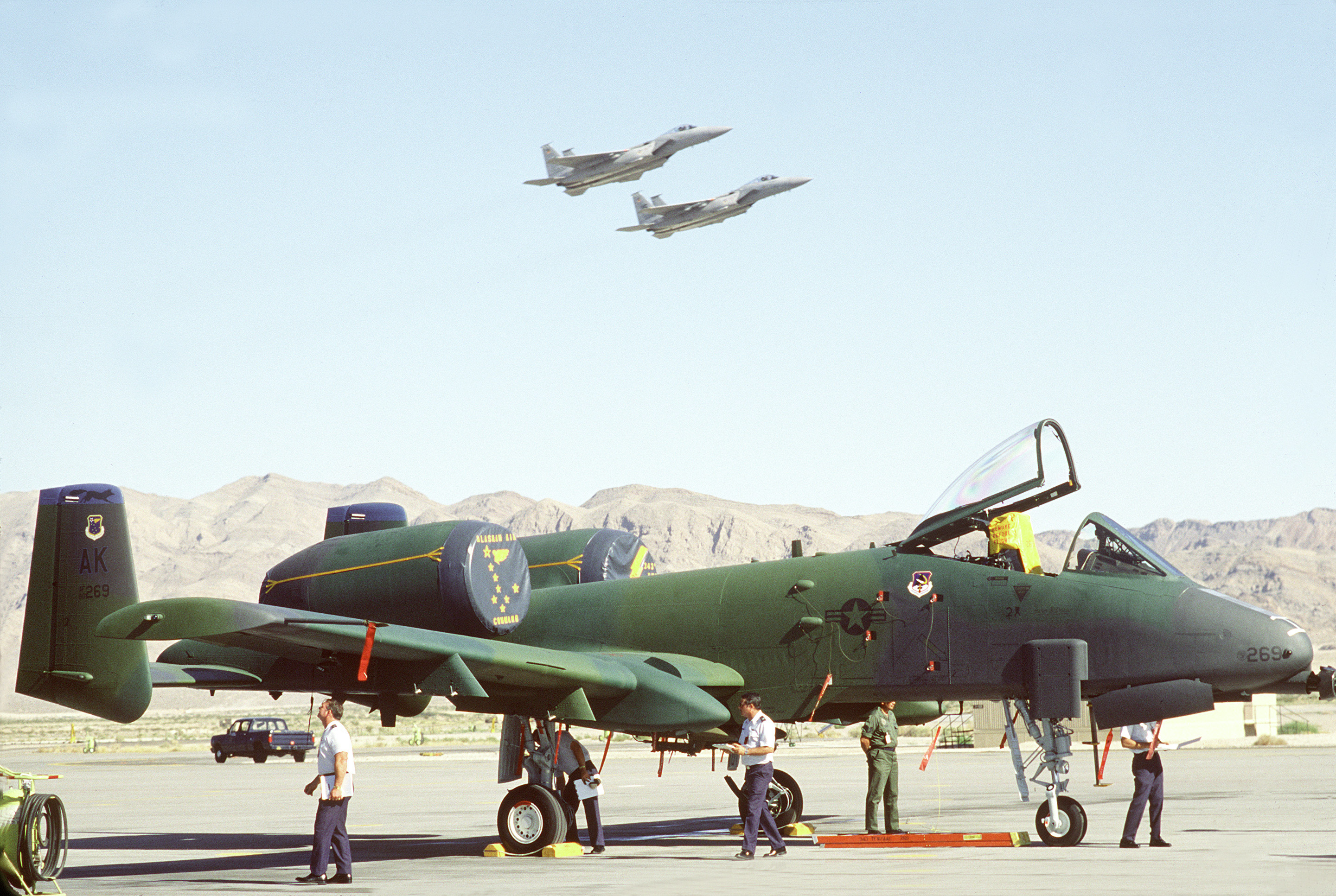
An A-10 is inspected at Gunsmoke '87

Gunsmoke (officially known as the Air Force Worldwide Gunnery Competition) was a air-to-surface gunnery meet for conventional weapons, hosted by the United States Air Force. It was held biennially from 1949 to 1995, excepting a few years. It was succeeded by Hawgsmoke. The competition was held in odd-numbered years, alternating with the William Tell competition in even-numbered years.
