= 79th Fighter Squadron =

79th Fighter Squadron

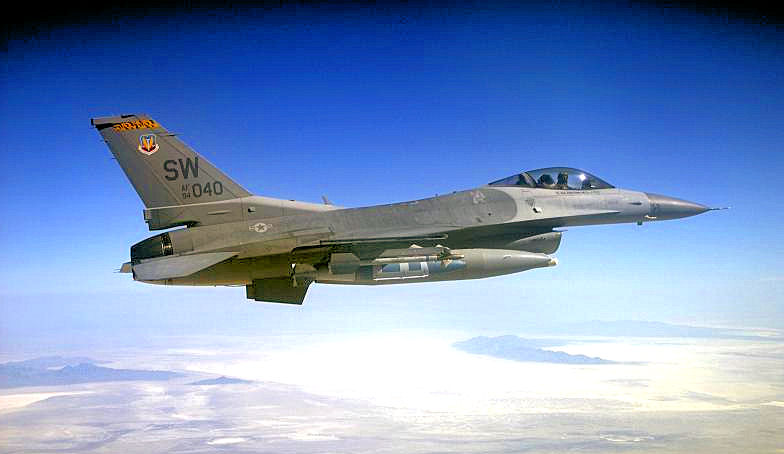
- 79th Fighter Squadron F-16C over the Utah Test and Training Range (Note: Aircraft is General Dynamics F-16C Block 50 Fighting Falcon serial 94-49. Taken in 2002.)
- Active: 1918; 1933–1945; 1946–1993; 1994–present
- Country: United States
- Branch: United States Air Force
- Role: Fighter
- Part of: 20th Operations Group
- Garrison/HQ: Shaw Air Force Base
- Nickname(s): Tigers
- Engagements: European Theater of Operations; Desert Storm
- Decorations: Distinguished Unit Citation; Air Force Outstanding Unit Award

Commanders
- Notable commanders: Frank O'Driscoll Hunter; James Ferguson; James E. Hill; John G. Lorber

Insignia
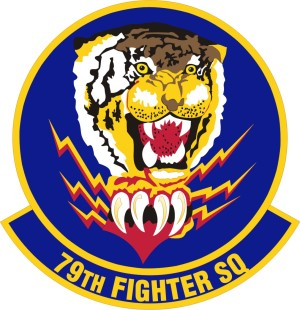
- 79th Fighter Squadron emblem (updated 29 March 1996)

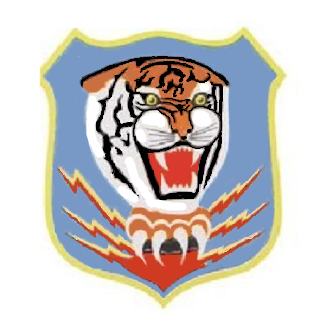
- 79 Fighter-Bomber Sq emblem (approved 31 January 1955)

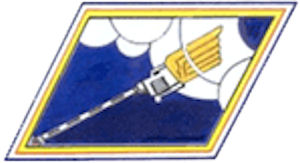
- 79th Pursuit Squadron emblem

The 79th Fighter Squadron is part of the 20th Fighter Wing at Shaw Air Force Base, South Carolina. It operates the General Dynamics F-16 Fighting Falcon aircraft conducting air superiority missions.

The squadron is one of the oldest in the United States Air Force, its origins dating to 22 February 1918, being organized at Rich Field, Waco, Texas, as a pilot training Squadron during World War I. The squadron saw combat during World War II, and became part of the United States Air Forces in Europe (USAFE) during the Cold War.

== History ==
The 79th Fighter Squadron traces its history back to February 1918, when it was first organized as the 79th Aero Squadron.

The unit was inactive from November 1918 until April 1933, when it became the 79th Pursuit Squadron, flying the Boeing P-12 at Barksdale Field, Louisiana. From 1940 to 1942, the squadron trained combat pilots and flew the Curtiss P-40 Warhawk from bases on the East Coast.

=== Second World War ===
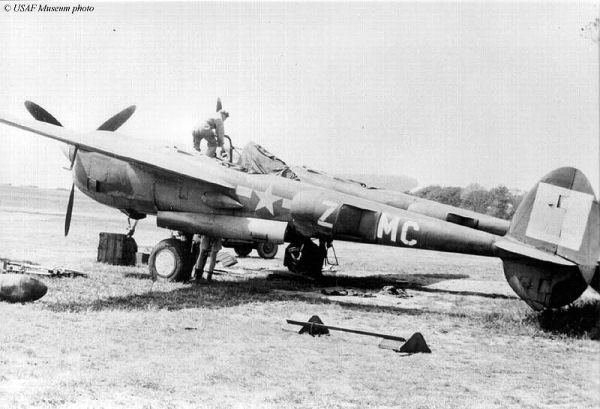
Lockheed P-38J Lightning of the 79th Fighter Squadron.

In 1943, the 79th converted to the Lockheed P-38 Lightning, flying out of Northamptonshire, England, performing duties as bomber escorts and conducting fighter sweeps over Germany. The 79th remained at English bases throughout the war, supporting both the Normandy invasion and the allied drive into Germany. The squadron returned to the States and was inactivated on 19 October 1945.

=== Post-war reactivation ===
The 79th was again brought to active service on 29 July 1946, at Biggs Field, Texas. The unit moved to Shaw Field, South Carolina, in October 1946. The squadron moved again to Langley Air Force Base, Virginia, in November 1951.

=== With NATO in Europe ===
In June 1952, the squadron began to train to support NATO's Allied Forces Central Europe ground forces in conventional and nuclear roles arriving at RAF Woodbridge, England, 1 October 1952, flying first the F-84G Thunderjet and then in 1955 the swept wing F-84F Thunderstreak. Redesignated as the 79th Tactical Fighter Squadron, the unit transitioned onto the North American F-100 Super Sabre in 1957 and shared RAF Woodbridge with the 78th Tactical Fighter Squadron of the 81st Tactical Fighter Wing and operated locally under the command of the 81st Wing which was based at nearby RAF Bentwaters. The next change came in 1970, when the squadron transitioned to the General Dynamics F-111 Aardvark and moved to RAF Upper Heyford, England. The 79th received the Commander in Chief's Trophy in 1981, as the best tactical fighter squadron in U.S. Air Forces in Europe.

=== Desert Storm ===
From 1990 to 1991, the 79th deployed to Southwest Asia to support Operations Desert Shield and Desert Storm. On 30 June 1993 the squadron was yet again inactivated.

=== Return to the United States ===
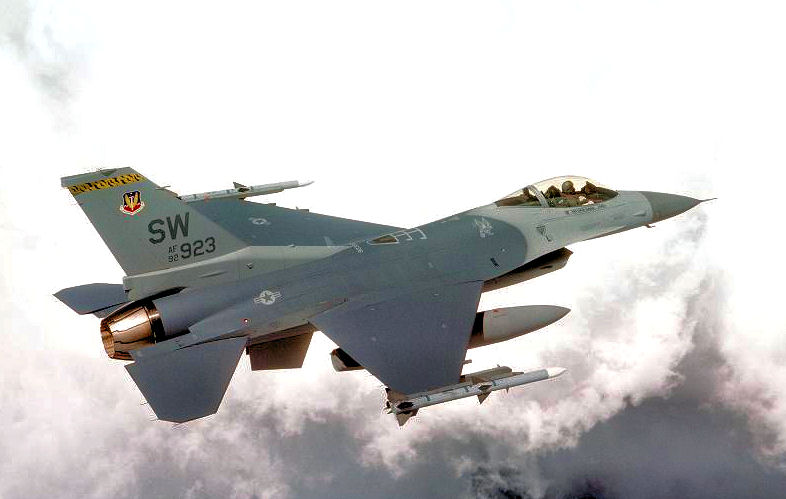
79th Fighter Squadron F-16C over Colorado (Note: Aircraft is General Dynamics F-16C Block 50P serial 92-3923, taken on 11 August 2001.)

On 1 January 1994, the 79th was reactivated at Shaw Air Force Base, South Carolina, transitioning to the General Dynamics F-16 Fighting Falcon and assuming the mission of suppression of enemy air defenses. Since that time, the 79th has continuously supported Operations Northern and Southern Watch in Southwest Asia.

In December 1998, the 79th took an active part in Operation Desert Fox in conjunction with Operation Southern Watch demands. The squadron flew more than 1,000 successful combat sorties with these dual operational requirements. In January 1999, the 79th Fighter Squadron was awarded the South Carolina Air Force Association's Outstanding Air Force Unit of the Year award. Also, in 1999, the squadron was honored with the Air Combat Command's Maintenance Effectiveness Award. In June 1999, the 79th deployed F-16CJs in support of Operation Allied Force to a bare base in Southwest Asia.

==== 2013 Sequestration ====
Air Combat Command officials announced a stand down and reallocation of flying hours for the rest of the fiscal year 2013 due to mandatory budget cuts. The across-the board spending cuts, called sequestration, took effect 1 March when Congress failed to agree on a deficit-reduction plan.

Squadrons either stood down on a rotating basis or kept combat ready or at a reduced readiness level called "basic mission capable" for part or all of the remaining months in fiscal 2013. This affected the 79th Fighter Squadron, with a reduction of its flying hours, placing it into a basic mission capable status from 5 April – 30 July, then returning it to combat mission ready through September 2013.

== Lineage ==
Squadron B, Taliaferro Field, Texas

- Organized as 79th Aero Squadron on 22 February 1918 (Note: This squadron is not related to the 79th Aero Squadron organized on 15 August 1917 at Kelly Field, Texas and redesignated 491st Aero Squadron on 1 February 1918.)

Redesignated Squadron B, Taliaferro Field, Texas on 23 July 1918
Demobilized on 15 November 1918

79th Fighter Squadron

- Constituted as the 79th Observation Squadron on 18 October 1927

Redesignated 79th Pursuit Squadron on 8 May 1929
Organized as a Regular Army Inactive unit with reserve personnel on 7 September 1932 (Note: Regular Army Inactive units were units that were constituted in the regular army. Although they were not activated, they were organized with reserve personnel during the 1920s and early 1930s. Even though they had reserve personnel assigned, they were not Organized Reserve units. Because they had no regular personnel they were still considered inactive in the regular army. Clay, p. vi)
Activated on 1 April 1933
Consolidated with Squadron B, Taliaferro Field on 25 May 1933
Redesignated 79th Pursuit Squadron (Fighter) on 6 December 1939
Redesignated 79th Pursuit Squadron (Interceptor) on 12 March 1941
Redesignated 79th Fighter Squadron on 15 May 1942
Redesignated 79th Fighter Squadron (Twin Engine) on 30 December 1942
Redesignated 79th Fighter Squadron, Two Engine on 20 August 1943
Redesignated 79th Fighter Squadron, Single Engine on 5 September 1944
Inactivated on 18 October 1945

- Activated on 29 July 1946

Redesignated 79th Fighter Squadron, Jet on 15 June 1948
Redesignated 79th Fighter-Bomber Squadron on 20 January 1950
Redesignated 79th Tactical Fighter Squadron on 8 July 1958
Redesignated 79th Fighter Squadron on 1 October 1991
Inactivated on 30 June 1993

- Activated on 1 January 1994.

=== Assignments ===
- Unknown, 22 February–15 November 1918 (Note: If location at Waco, Texas was Rich Field, probably assigned to Post Headquarters, Rich Field, then after move to Hicks, Texas to Post Headquarters, Talliaferro Field.)
- Eighth Corps Area, 18 October 1927 (in inactive status)
- 20th Pursuit Group (later 20th Fighter Group), 1 April 1933 – 18 October 1945
- 20th Fighter Group (later 20th Fighter-Bomber Group), 29 July 1946 (attached to 20th Fighter-Bomber Wing after 15 November 1952)
- 20th Fighter-Bomber Wing (later 20th Tactical Fighter Wing), 8 February 1955 (attached to 39th Tactical Group, 1–31 August 1990 and February 1991
- 20th Operations Group, 31 March 1992 – 30 September 1993
- 20th Operations Group, 1 January 1994 – present

=== Stations ===
- Waco, Texas, 20 February 1918
- Taliaferro Field, Texas, 28 February–15 November 1918
- San Antonio, Texas, 7 September 1932
- Barksdale Field, Louisiana, 1 April 1933
- Moffett Field, California. 19 November 1939
- Hamilton Field, California, 9 September 1940 (operated From: Oakland Airport, California 8 December 1941 – 8 February 1942)
- Bluethenthal Field, North Carolina, c. 21 February 1942
- Morris Field, North Carolina, 23 April 1942
- Drew Field, Florida, August 1942
- Paine Field, Washington, 30 September 1942
- March Field, California, c. 1 January–11 August 1943
- RAF Kings Cliffe (AAF-367), England, c. 27 August 1943 – 11 October 1945
- Camp Kilmer, New Jersey, 16–18 October 1945
- Biggs Field, Texas, 29 July 1946
- Shaw Field (later, Shaw Air Force Base), South Carolina, c. 25 October 1946
- Langley Air Force Base, Virginia, 19 November 1951 – 22 May 1952
- RAF Wethersfield, England, 1 June 1952
- RAF Woodbridge, England, 1 October 1952
- RAF Upper Heyford, England, c. 1 May 1970 – 30 September 1993 (deployed at Incirlik Air Base, Turkey, 1–31 August 1990 and February 1991
- Shaw Air Force Base, South Carolina, 1 January 1994 – present

=== Aircraft ===
- Curtiss JN-4, 1918
- Curtiss JN-6, 1918
- Thomas-Morse S-4, 1918 (Note: Aircraft operated in 1918, particularly the S-4, are not certain. Robertson.)
- Boeing P-12, 1930–1935
- Boeing P-26 Peashooter, 1934–1938
- Curtiss P-36 Hawk, 1938–1940
- Curtiss P-40 Warhawk, 1940–1942
- Bell P-39 Airacobra, 1942–1943
- Lockheed P-38 Lightning, 1943–1944
- North American P-51 Mustang, 1944–1945, 1946–1948
- Republic F-84 Thunderjet, 1948–1957
- North American F-100 Super Sabre, 1957–1970
- General Dynamics F-111 Aardvark, 1970–1993
- General Dynamics F-16 Fighting Falcon, 1994–present

== See also ==
- List of American Aero Squadrons
