= John G. Lorber =

United States Air Force general

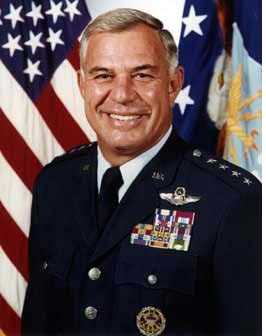
- General John G. Lorber
- Born: December 25, 1941; Waverly, Iowa
- Died: March 7, 2021 (Age 79); Colorado Springs, Colorado
- Burial place: US Air Force Academy Cemetery
- Military career
- Allegiance: United States of America
- Branch: United States Air Force
- Service years: 1964–1997
- Rank: General
- Commands: Pacific Air Forces; 432nd Tactical Fighter Wing; 79th Tactical Fighter Squadron
- Conflicts: Vietnam War
- Awards: Legion of Merit; Distinguished Flying Cross (2); Air Medal (16)

General John George Lorber (December 25, 1941 - March 7, 2021) was a retired four-star general in the United States Air Force (USAF). He served as commander of Pacific Air Forces at Hickam Air Force Base, Hawaii. As commander, he had responsibility for USAF activities spread over half the world in a command that supports 44,000 airmen serving principally in Hawaii, Alaska, Guam, the Republic of Korea and Japan.

== Background ==
Lorber was born on 25 December 1941 to George and Wilma Lorber in Waverly, Iowa. He graduated from the United States Air Force Academy in 1964. He flew as a fast-moving forward air controller in the Vietnam War, commanded a fighter squadron and wing, and was a command pilot with more than 5,000 flying hours, primarily in fighter aircraft. He retired from active duty on June 25, 1997.

He died on 7 March 2021, survived by his wife, four children and six grandchildren.

== Education ==
- 1964 Bachelor of Science degree, United States Air Force Academy, Colorado Springs, Colorado
- 1974 Squadron Officer School, Maxwell Air Force Base, Alabama
- 1979 Air Command and Staff College, Maxwell Air Force Base, Alabama
- 1979 Master's degree in personnel management, Troy State University, Alabama
- 1985 Air War College, Maxwell Air Force Base, Alabama

== Assignments ==
- August 1964 - August 1965, student, pilot training, Laredo Air Force Base, Texas
- August 1965 - April 1969, T-37 Tweet instructor pilot and check pilot, 3640th Pilot Training Squadron, Laredo Air Force Base, Texas
- April 1969 - November 1969, student, F-4 Phantom II pilot training, Homestead Air Force Base, Florida
- November 1969 - January 1971, F-4 aircraft commander, instructor pilot and standardization and evaluation flight examiner, flying combat as a fast-moving forward air controller, 497th Tactical Fighter Squadron "Night Owls," 8th Tactical Fighter Wing, Ubon Royal Thai Air Force Base, Thailand
- January 1971 - May 1971, F-111 Aardvark aircraft commander, 442nd Tactical Fighter Training Squadron, Nellis Air Force Base, Nevada
- May 1971 - January 1975, instructor pilot and standardization and evaluation flight examiner, 77th Tactical Fighter Squadron, 20th Tactical Fighter Wing, Royal Air Force Station Upper Heyford, England
- January 1975 - July 1978, candidate counselor and recruiter specialist, athletic department, U.S. Air Force Academy, Colorado Springs, Colorado
- August 1978 - November 1979, student, Air Command and Staff College, Maxwell Air Force Base, Alabama
- November 1979 - April 1980, operations officer, 77th Tactical Fighter Squadron, 20th Tactical Fighter Wing, RAF Upper Heyford, England
- April 1980 - July 1982, commander, 79th Tactical Fighter Squadron, 20th Tactical Fighter Wing, RAF Upper Heyford, England. During this period, the 79th TFS was repeatedly recognized by NATO as the top squadron in the best prepared wing in NATO. Then Lt. Col. Lorber's initiatives such as the "Tiger Flag" joint training exercises with Royal Air Force fighter squadrons located in Scotland and the Radar Bomb Scoring site at RAF Spadeadam set a new standard for combat readiness exercises initiated and executed at the squadron level. A talented painter, his "Hard to be Humble" tiger painting is a powerful visual representation of his leadership style and single minded dedication to combat readiness.
- July 1982 - August 1984, nuclear employment and policy planner, deputy director for force development and strategic plans, Office of the Joint Chiefs of Staff, Washington, D.C.
- August 1984 - June 1985, student, Air War College, Maxwell Air Force Base, Alabama
- July 1985 - July 1986, deputy commander of operations, 8th Tactical Fighter Wing, Kunsan Air Base, South Korea
- August 1986 - June 1987, deputy chief of staff for operations, 5th Air Force, Yokota Air Base, Japan
- June 1987 - July 1989, commander, 432nd Tactical Fighter Wing, Misawa Air Base, Japan
- July 1989 - July 1992, deputy chief of staff, plans, Headquarters Pacific Air Forces, Hickam Air Force Base, Hawaii
- July 1992 - July 1993, director of plans, deputy chief of staff for plans and operations, Headquarters USAF, Washington, D.C.
- July 1993 - October 1994, vice commander in chief, United States Air Forces in Europe, Ramstein Air Base, Germany
- October 1994 - September 1997, commander, Pacific Air Forces, Hickam Air Force Base, Hawaii

== Flight information ==
- Rating: Command pilot
- Flight hours: More than 5,000
- Aircraft flown: T-33, T-37, F-4, F-16, F-15 and F-111

== Awards and decorations ==
- Legion of Merit
- Distinguished Flying Cross with oak leaf cluster
- Defense Meritorious Service Medal
- Meritorious Service Medal with two oak leaf clusters
- Air Medal with 15 oak leaf clusters
- Air Force Commendation Medal
