= 20th Operations Group =

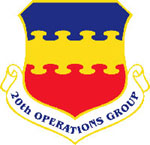
- Emblem of the 20th Operations Group
- Active: 1930–1945; 1946–1955; 1992–present
- Country: United States
- Branch: United States Air Force

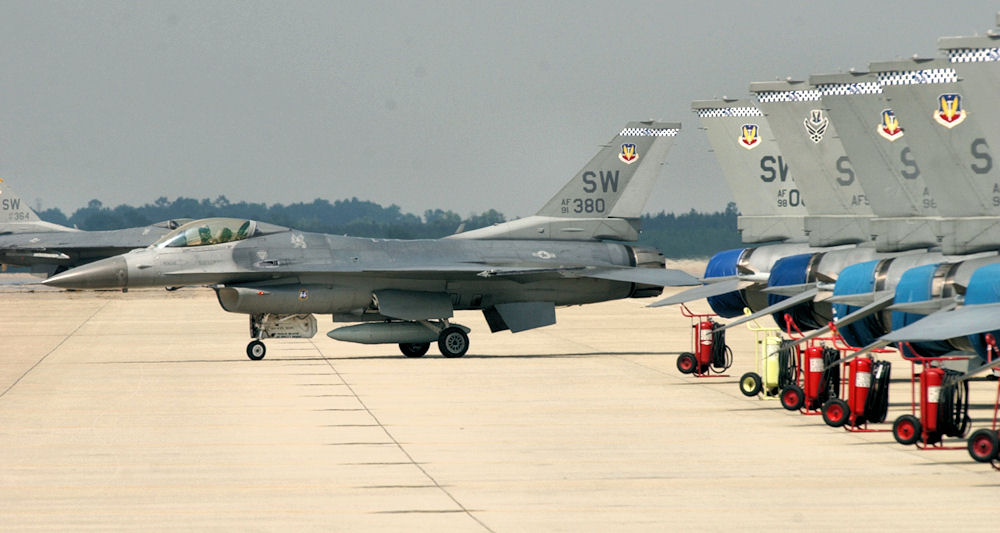
General Dynamics F-16CJ Block 50D (91-0380) of the 55th Fighter Squadron returns to the parking ramp after another local training mission

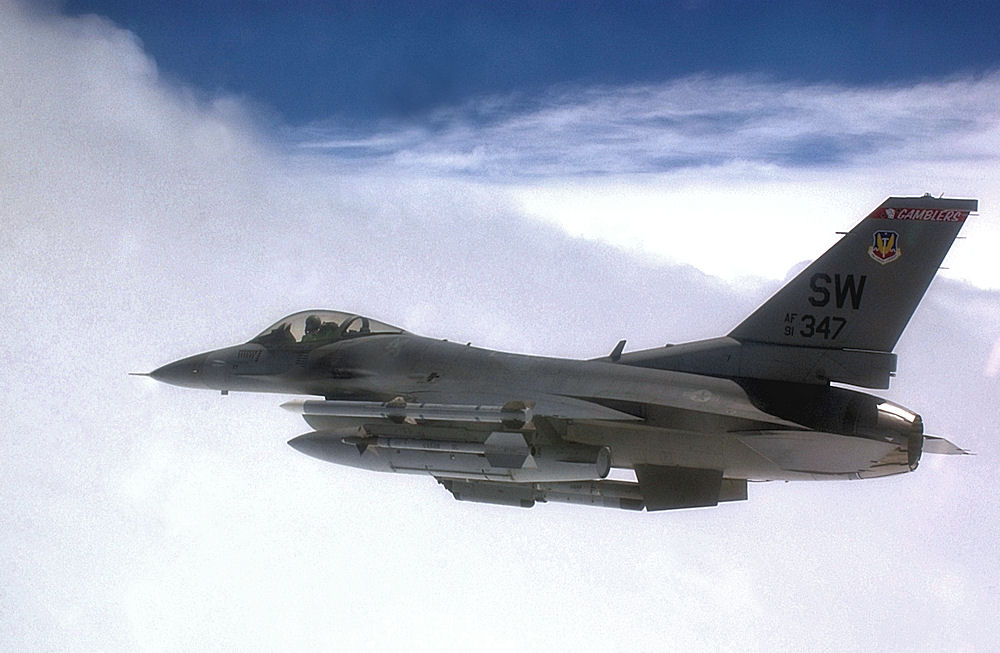
F-16CJ Block 50C (91-0347) from the 77th Fighter Squadron

The 20th Operations Group (20 OG) is the flying component of the 20th Fighter Wing, assigned to the United States Air Force Air Combat Command. It is stationed at Shaw Air Force Base, South Carolina. It is a successor organization of the 20th Pursuit Group, one of the 15 original combat air groups formed by the U.S. Army before World War II.

During World War II the 20th Fighter Group was an Eighth Air Force fighter unit stationed in the United Kingdom. It arrived at RAF Kings Cliffe in 1943. It was the oldest USAAF group to be assigned to the Eighth Air Force for an extended period, flying 312 combat missions. It was awarded a Distinguished Unit Citation for a sweep over Germany on 8 April 1944.

Today the group mobilizes, deploys, flies, and fights approximately 80 F-16CJ Fighting Falcon fighter aircraft. It can carry out conventional air-to-surface, air superiority, suppression of enemy air defenses, destruction of enemy air defenses and maritime operations.

== History ==
For additional history and lineage, see 20th Fighter Wing

=== Origins ===
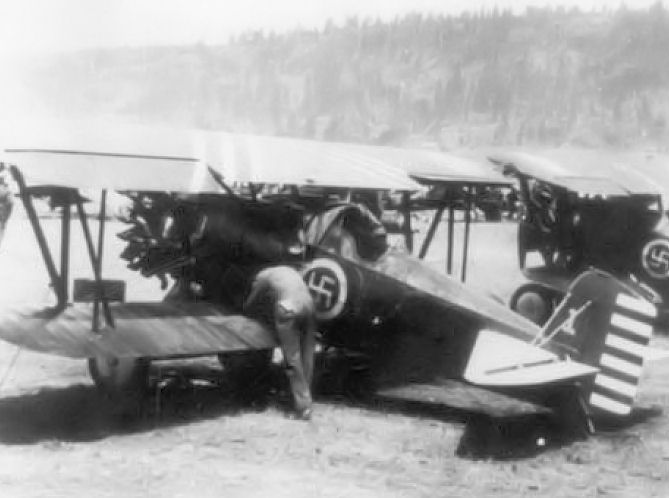
A P-12B of the 55th Pursuit Squadron. The squadron insignia at the time was a medium blue circle with a yellow surround, on which was superimposed a yellow swastika. This was the squadron insignia until 4 May 1932.

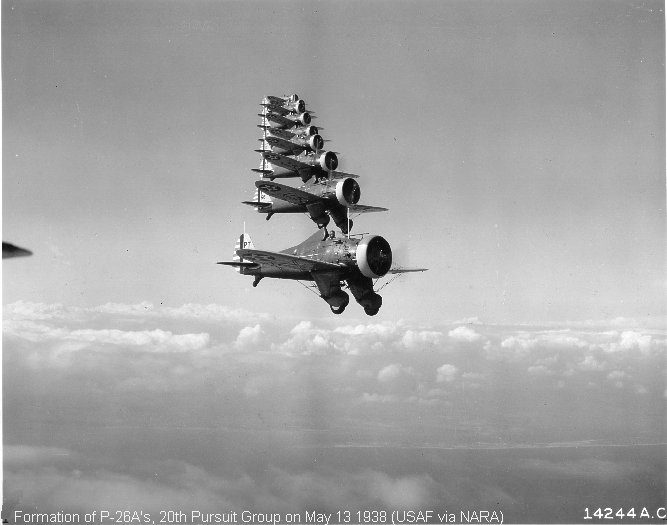
P-26As of the 20th Pursuit Group, 13 May 1938

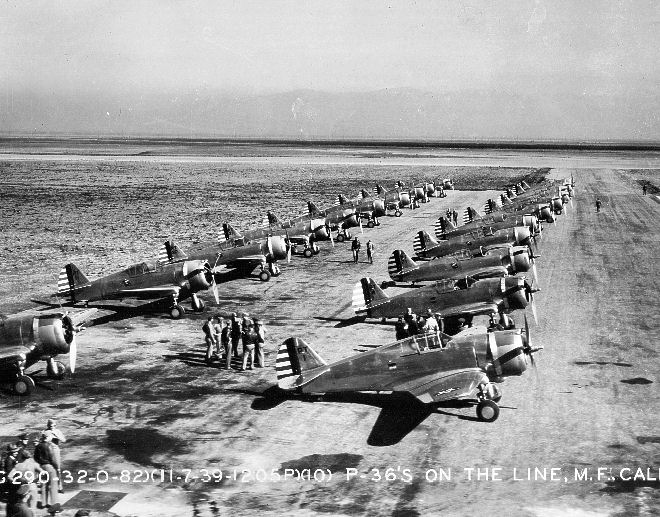
20th Pursuit Group P-36s at Moffett Field, California, 1939

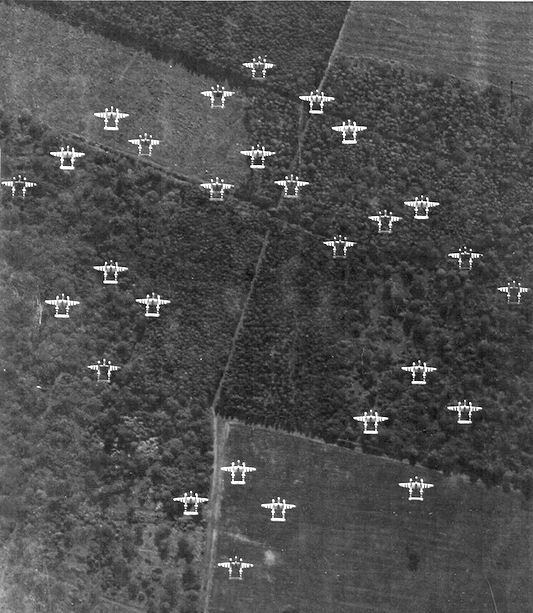
P-38 Lightnings from the 20th Fighter Group in formation over the countryside near their airfield at King's Cliffe

The 20th Balloon Group was authorized as an inactive organization of the United States Army Air Corps on 18 October 1927. It was redesignated as the 20th Pursuit Group in 1929 and activated on 15 November 1930 at Mather Field, California and consisted of the 71st Service Squadron (the administrative and support element of the group) and initially two flying squadrons:

- 55th Pursuit Squadron (attached 15 November 1930, assigned 15 June 1932)
- 77th Pursuit Squadron (assigned)
- 78th Pursuit Squadron (assigned 1 April 1931)
- 79th Pursuit Squadron (assigned 1 April 1933)

The 20th flew Boeing P-12 single-seat, biplane fighters which featured two .30 caliber machine guns, an open cockpit, a 500 horsepower (370 kW) Pratt and Whitney engine, and a top speed of 180 miles per hour.

Upon activation, the group welcomed the arrival of the first of many famous airmen to grace its ranks. Major Clarence L. Tinker, its first commander, led the group until 13 October 1932. Major Tinker, part Osage Indian, gained fame as Major General Tinker, World War II Commander of the Seventh Air Force in the Pacific Theater. Tinker Air Force Base, Oklahoma, was named in his honor a year after his death during the Battle of Midway in 1942.

On 15 May 1931, the 20th PG made a cross-country trip while going on maneuvers. These maneuvers were part of the first of its kind for the Air Corps. "The Great Air Armada" put on shows in Chicago, New York City, Boston, and Washington, DC. The maneuvers consisted of all Air Corps aircraft with the exception of basic trainers, around 640 aircraft.

The Group remained at Mather Field for a little less than two years until 15 October 1932. On that date an advance party of more than 200 officers, enlisted men, and their dependents, under the command of Captain Thomas Boland, sailed from San Francisco aboard the USAT U. S. Grant. They traveled through the Panama Canal and debarked at New Orleans, Louisiana, on 30 October 1932. On the following day, they arrived at Barksdale Field, Louisiana. Just prior to its transfer to Barksdale, the group was assigned, along with the 3rd Attack Group, to the 3rd Attack Wing in June 1932. The 3rd Attack Wing and Group operated out of Fort Crockett, Texas.

By February 1933 when Barksdale Field was formally dedicated, the group's training program was in full operation. Its aerial training mission focused on the development of procedures and techniques for engaging enemy aircraft and provided for the protection of vital industrial centers, airdromes, and bombardment aircraft.

In October 1934, the group (by then four flying squadrons strong), made its first aircraft transition—from the P-12 to the Boeing P-26 Peashooter. This open cockpit monoplane had a 600 horsepower (450 kW) engine and a top speed of 253 miles per hour. Like the P-12, it possessed two .30 caliber machine guns. Unlike its predecessor, it also featured wing-mounted bomb racks. P-26s were operated by the group until January 1938, when pilots of the unit flew their complement of 14 to the Rockwell Field Air Depot in California. The 20th Pursuit Group acquired its first aircraft with a closed cockpit, the Curtiss P-36 Hawk, in September 1938. The P-36 had a 1,050 horsepower (780 kW) engine, and a top speed of 303 miles per hour. It could carry up to 400 pounds of bombs underslung. During this time, the 20th began training, participating in maneuvers and tactical exercises, and conducting aerial reviews and aircraft demonstrations.

On 15 November 1939 the 20th moved to Moffett Field, California; it stayed there less than one year, and moved again on 9 September 1940 to Hamilton Field, also in California. At Hamilton the group changed aircraft once again, this time to the Curtiss P-40 Warhawk. This was the top-of-the-line pre-World War II pursuit fighter. It had a range of 750 miles (1,210 km), a top speed of 343 miles per hour, two .50 caliber machine guns in the nose, and four more in the wings.

Several events in 1941 marked the group's assignment at Hamilton Field. Deployed flights spent the first part of 1941 at Muroc Lake, California, and Esler Field, Louisiana, conducting maneuvers. In October 1941, the group split into its component squadrons and deployed to various locations on the east coast, with group headquarters temporarily established at Morris Field, North Carolina. In December 1941, the 20th reassembled at Hamilton Field, California.

=== World War II ===
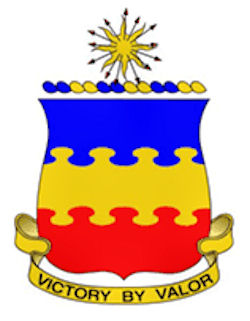
Emblem of the 20th Fighter Group

==== Training unit ====
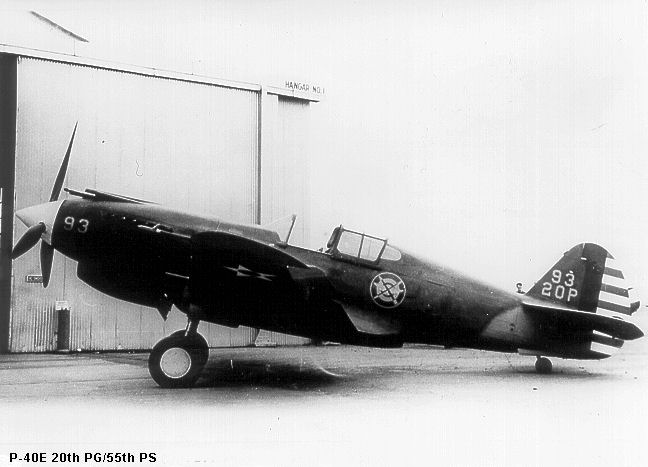
A 55th Pursuit Squadron P-40E in 1942

The 20th PG made several station moves following the United States' declaration of war on Japan.

Until February 1942 the 20th performed air defense operations. From Hamilton Field it returned to the east coast and Wilmington, North Carolina, to Morris Field, North Carolina. The group's mission at this time was to act as a training unit to create new fighter groups. The group would receive new personnel, train them, and then they would be transferred out in mass to form a new unit, leaving only a small cadre behind to start the process over again.

This process is believed to have been used for as many as six new Fighter Groups. The individual squadrons were stationed at various fields in South and North Carolina and Florida. While at Wilmington, the group exchanged its P-40s for P-39 Airacobras as part of its training role. Additionally, the group received P-43 Lancers while in the Carolinas, also for training purposes. The P-43 was obsolete at this point and was never on the official record of the group. This aircraft was the predecessor of the P-47 Thunderbolt.

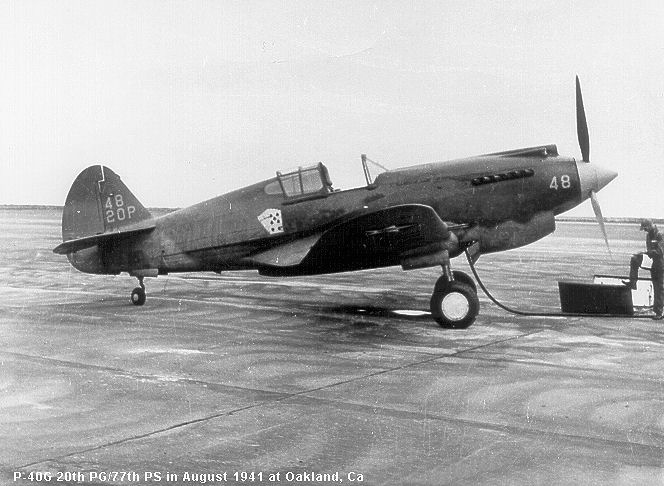
A 77th Pursuit Squadron P-40G at Oakland Airport, California in 1942

At the end of September 1942 the group moved to Paine Field, Washington state – all in the latter part of 1942. In January 1943 the group moved to March Field, California, where it acquired its P-38 Lightning aircraft. In March the group would once again proceed with training new members, but this time the results of that training would deploy to England.

==== RAF Kings Cliffe ====
On 11 August 1943, the personnel of the 20th departed California aboard three trains and arrived at Camp Miles Standish, Massachusetts, five days later. From this European staging area the members of the 20th embarked on RMS Queen Elizabeth and departed for the United Kingdom on 20 August 1943. If the members of the 20th had expected a typical Queen Elizabeth pleasure cruise, they were sorely disappointed. The ship had been refitted to accommodate over 19,000 men. Staterooms designed for two or three people had 20 to 30 bunks double and triple stacked for officers and enlisted men. In addition to these conditions, enlisted personnel also served shifts of 24 hours on deck, followed by 24 hours below deck. This doubled the number of personnel the cramped quarters could accommodate. Due to her high speed, the ship traveled unescorted, despite the ever-present threat posed by German U-boats. The five-day trip across the Atlantic was reported as uneventful, except for long chow lines (two meals per day) and frequent boat drills. RMS Queen Elizabeth dropped anchor on 25 August and the men of the 20th disembarked at the Firth of Clyde. From there they were transported to the docks at Greenock, Scotland, and then, by train, to their new home, RAF Kings Cliffe, England.

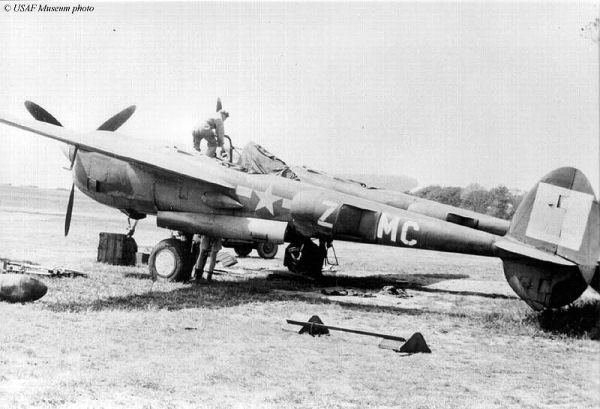
Lockheed P-38J Lightning 42-67651 (MC-Z) of the 79th Fighter Squadron. MC was the squadron code of the 79th Fighter Squadron. The Squadron's aircraft also carried a square marking on the tail to aid identification.

Fortune smiled on the 55th FS at this time. Due to space restrictions it had to be stationed at RAF Wittering, about five miles from the rest of the group. The facilities there were much superior to those at King's Cliffe. The 55th Squadron joined the rest of the group at King's Cliffe in April 1944. In England, the group was assigned to the VIII Fighter Command. The group was under the command of the 67th Fighter Wing. Aircraft of the 20th were identified by a black/white stripes along their cowlings and tails.

Arriving at King's Cliffe, the group faced the prospect of operating from one of the most primitive airfields in England. The buildings were old and inadequate and airfield facilities were close to nonexistent. The only thing in abundance was poor weather and mud.

Overcoming the initial shock of these conditions the group soon settled in and got on with the serious job of flying. Prior to the 20th's arrival in theater, the Republic P-47 Thunderbolt served as the primary US fighter aircraft in Europe. This aircraft was a formidable match for the German Luftwaffe (Air Force) fighters in air-to-air combat but lacked one important feature—range. Without sufficient range, the conduct of daytime bomber escort missions, first into Europe and then Germany itself, proved nearly impossible. That problem was perhaps best illustrated on 14 October 1943 when 60 of 293 unescorted bombers (20 percent), dispatched against the ball-bearing works in Schweinfurt failed to return from their mission.

===== P-38 Lightning =====
With the arrival in Europe of the Lockheed P-38, the long range escort mission of the Eighth Air Force began in earnest. Initially, due to a lack of available aircraft, the 20th conducted operations as an attached component of the 55th Fighter Group. Full group operations for the 20th commenced in late December 1943 when it became fully equipped with P-38s.

One of the early highlights of the group's World War II exploits entailed the escort of a bombing mission into the Bordeaux area of France on 31 December 1943. This 1,300-mile round trip constituted the longest fighter escort mission to date. That distance, in fact, stretched the P-38s beyond their operational limits, forcing 17 of 31 aircraft to land at other bases due to insufficient fuel.

Despite its advantages of range and speed over its German contemporaries, the P-38 suffered limitations which resulted in less than a break-even rate in enemy aircraft downed versus 20th aircraft lost. Within a 90-day span, from 31 December 1943 to 31 March 1944 the operational ledger disclosed 52 German aircraft destroyed while the 20th's losses amounted to 54 pilots. By the end of the P-38 era in July 1944, the 20th's kill rate improved slightly; the group logged 84 pilots lost versus 89 German aircraft destroyed in the air and 31 destroyed on the ground.

The P-38 was ill-equipped to deal with the extreme cold and high moisture conditions that prevailed at the operating altitudes of 20,000 to 33,000 feet over Northern Europe. A high number of group casualties resulted from engine failure at altitude. Thrown rods, engine explosions and unexpected power reduction during flight were all fatal flaws that the Axis aircraft exploited. The P-38 was equal to any German fighter at altitudes below 15,000 feet, but was usually at a disadvantage above that altitude.

Despite the shortcomings of its aircraft, the 20th earned a healthy reputation based on its escort of successful bombing raids and its secondary mission of ground strafing. From the outset of its World War II operations, the 20th's mission concentrated on escorting medium and heavy bombers to targets on the continent. It retained this primary mission throughout the war. Its escort missions completed, however, the group began to routinely strafe targets of opportunity while en route back to England. The 20th became known as the "Loco Group" because of its numerous and successful attacks on locomotives. It received a Distinguished Unit Citation for its performance on 8 April 1944 when it struck airfields in central Germany and then, after breaking up an attack by enemy interceptors, proceeded to hit railroad equipment, oil facilities, power plants, factories, and other targets.

The group retained escort as its primary function until the end of the war, but in March 1944 began to fly fighter-bomber missions, which became almost as frequent as escort operations. The squadrons strafed and dive-bombed airfields, trains, vehicles, barges, tugs, bridges, flak positions, gun emplacements, barracks, radio stations, and other targets in France, Belgium, and Germany.

Aircraft from the 20th flew patrols over the English Channel during the invasion of Normandy in June 1944, and supported the invasion force later that month by escorting bombers that struck interdictory targets in France, Belgium, and the Netherlands, and by attacking troops, transportation targets, and airfields. The invasion of Normandy in early June 1944 featured 20th FG daylight escort operations in support of Allied fleet movements. The P-38 was specifically chosen for the task due to its distinctive shape (dual-boom fuselage) and the ease with which fleet anti-aircraft gunners could distinguish it from enemy aircraft.

In July 1944, the P-38 era for the 20th came to an end. On 19 July, Lieutenant Colonel Cy Wilson, the Group Commander, led 49 Lightnings on a bomber escort mission into Southern Germany. The next day two squadrons of P-38s operated with one squadron of P-51s. The group flew its final P-38 combat mission on 21 July.

===== P-51 Mustang =====
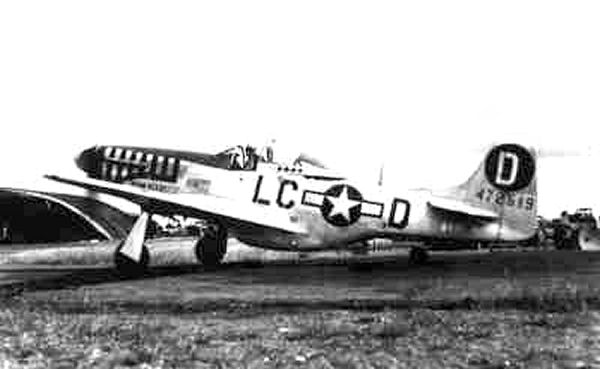
North American P-51D-20-NA Mustang Serial 44-72519 (LC-D) "Gumpy" of the 77th Fighter Squadron, flown by Colonel Robert P. Montgomery, 20th Fighter Group Commanding Officer (18 December 1944 – 3 October 1945). Col. Montgomery was credited with 3½ air victories and three on the ground. He was awarded the Distinguished Flying Cross on 2 November 1944 for leading the group on an escort mission to Merseberg where the Goup engaged a large number of Luftwaffe fighters resulting in a furious battle took place that ranged from 27,000 ft. to ground level.

The 20th FG converted to P-51s in July 1944 and continued to fly escort and fighter-bomber missions as the enemy retreated across France to the Siegfried Line. The group participated in Operation Market Garden, the airborne attack on the Netherlands in September 1944. It also escorted bombers to Germany and struck rail lines, trains, vehicles, barges, power stations, and other targets in and beyond the Siegfried Line during the period October–December 1944.

By November 1944, Allied air superiority had been so firmly established that the Luftwaffe attempted only two more full-scale interdiction missions against Allied bombers before the end of the war. On 2 November, a German force of about 250 fighter aircraft intercepted 1,121 Eighth Air Force bombers and their fighter escort en route to the synthetic oil plants in Merseburg, Germany. In the ferocious air battle that followed, Eighth Air Force fighters destroyed 148 German planes, more than half the attacking force. Aircrews of the 20th Group contributed to the elimination of 33 enemy aircraft on that day. Lieutenant Colonel Robert P. Montgomery led the 20th's assault, destroyed three aircraft himself and was awarded the Distinguished Service Cross for his performance.

The unit took part in the Battle of the Bulge by escorting bombers to the battle area. Germany launched its final major air defense operation on 19 January 1945. This last full-scale attack against Allied bombers lasted approximately 20 minutes. In that time, over the German homeland, aircraft of the Eighth Air Force downed a total of 121 out of 214 attacking aircraft without the single loss of a fighter aircraft. Only nine B-17s, two percent of the total force, were lost.

The late introduction of Luftwaffe jet aircraft, far superior to the P-51 mainstay of the Allied fighter force in both speed and high altitude performance, came too late to alter the course of the air struggle over Europe. The Me 262 twin jet and Me 163 single rocket engine aircraft first appeared in small numbers at the end of 1944. Although not a great threat in air-to air combat, (they lacked maneuverability), these aircraft proved almost impossible to stop when they attacked the heavy bombers.

The group flew patrols to support the airborne attack across the Rhine in March 1945, and carried out escort and fighter-bomber missions as enemy resistance collapsed in April. In the last month of the war, aircrews of the 20th downed their first Me262s. On 10 April 1945, during airfield attacks around Potsdam and Brandenburg, 20th pilots destroyed five Me262s in individual encounters, while the group as a whole eliminated a total of 55 German fighters (mostly on the ground).

Following the war, the 20th FG returned to the United States for inactivation at Camp Kilmer, New Jersey and was inactivated on 18 December 1945.

=== Cold War ===
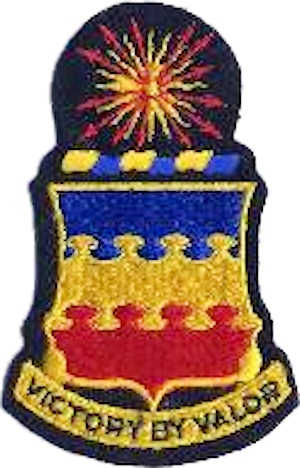
20th Fighter Group emblem

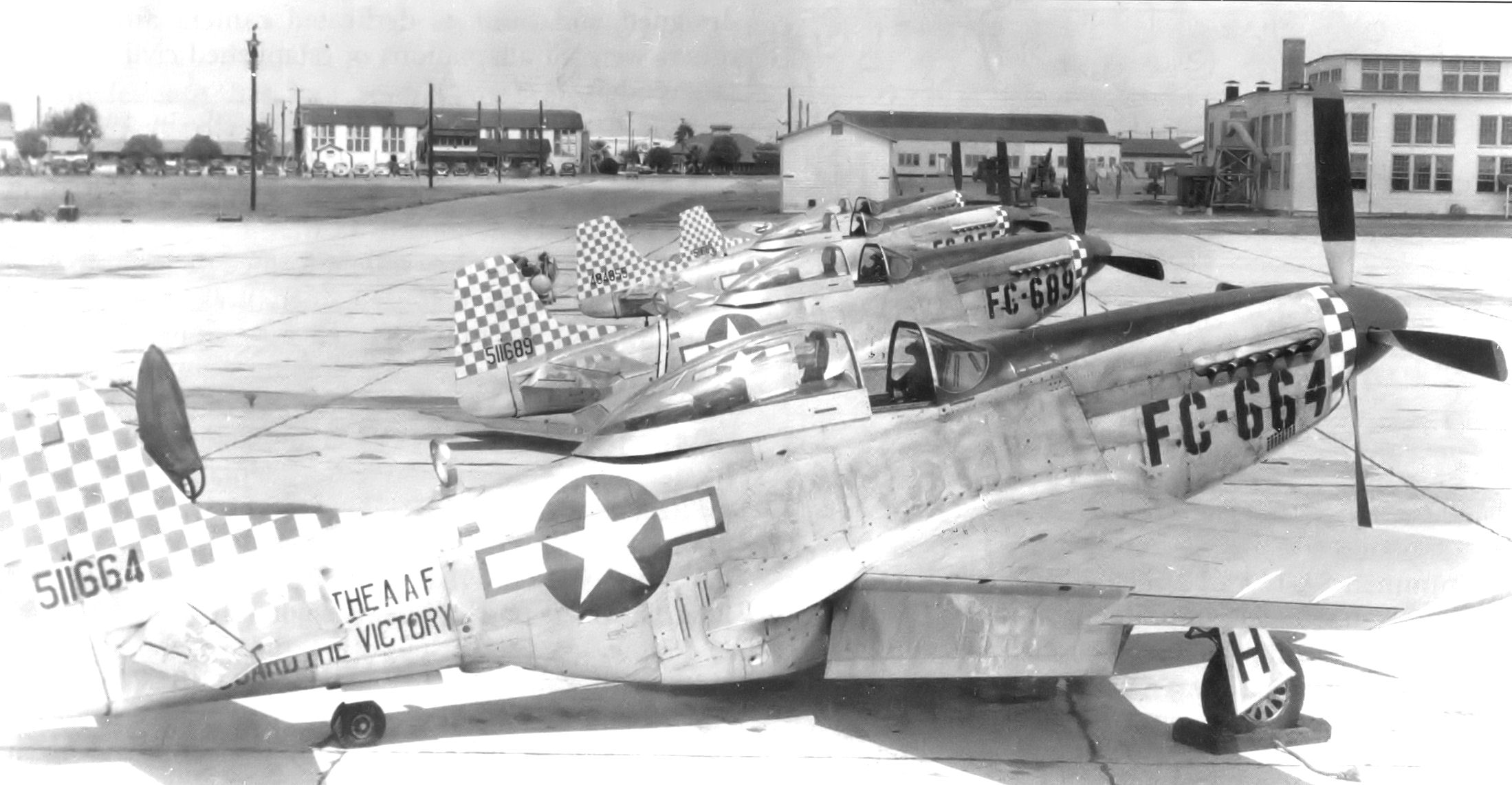
363rd Recon Group F-6 Mustangs in November 1946; possibly at Shaw Field

The 20th Fighter Group was reactivated on 29 July 1946 at Biggs Field, Texas. The group took part in training exercises and flight demonstrations and ferried aircraft within the United States. In October 1946, the group relocated to Shaw Field, South Carolina. In August 1947, it was assigned to the 20th Fighter Wing on 15 August 1947, an experimental wing formed under the wing base organization system which placed operational and support units under a single wing. The following year, the system was made permanent.

The 20th Fighter Group was first equipped with North American P-51D, then in February 1948 became the first unit to fly the Republic F-84C Thunderjet. The group was composed of the 55th, 77th and 79th Fighter Squadrons. The F-84s began arriving in February 1948 and ran through May when the full complement was received. Nine were lost in accidents before the remainder were returned to Republic Aircraft in May 1949 in exchange for F-84D models. Control over the wing changed hands on 1 February 1949 with its assignment to the Fourteenth Air Force.

In July 1950, the Korean War had just begun. USAF plans had been sent to the Strategic Air Command 12th Fighter-Escort Wing in England to bolster the forces in Europe. But the Cold War got hot before the 12th's F-84s were ready to go. The 20th's D.O.(Duty Officer) was called from a Saturday night party at the club to take a message that the 20th was going to England. The 20th had about seven days to get ready. It included receiving a set of two-230 gallon tip tanks for each airplane to replace the two-185 gallon tanks that had been provided with the F-84Ds.

On 19 July 1950 the 20th Fighter Bomber Group (FBG) under the command of Colonel John Dunning executed the first movement of a full jet fighter group to Europe. The 20th flew their F-84Ds from Shaw AFB to Dow AFB, Maine. At Dow AFB a message was received to remove personal baggage from the .50 cal. ammunition compartments so that live ammunition could be loaded. Headquarters felt there was a strong possibility that the Soviets would try to interfere with the movement of the unit to England. The 20th would then continue on its movement without Soviet action via Goose Bay AB, Labrador; Bluie West One, Greenland; Keflavík Air Base, Iceland; Kinross, Scotland and finally to RAF Manston, England. Halfway between Greenland and Iceland one of the F-84s had an engine flame out. The pilot bailed out but died from exposure before the rescue vessel could reach him.

While at Manston, the 20th Fighter Group was placed under the temporary operational control of the SAC 3rd Air Division. The group returned to Shaw in December, where almost all aircraft were found to have wing cracks to some degree, being sent to Republic Aircraft for repairs.

With most of the group's aircraft non-operational, the mission of the group became an indoctrination unit for new enlistees as part of the large influx of new airmen due to the Korean War. Over 700 new airmen were indoctrinated before the program was terminated in April 1951.

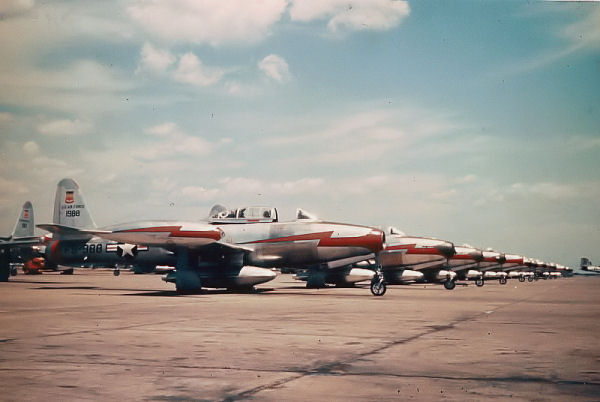
Republic F-84G Thunderjets of the 77th Fighter-Bomber Squadron at RAF Wethersfield, UK, 1952. (F-84G serial 51-988 nearest camera)

Under the Hobson Plan, there could be only one controlling wing per Air Force Base. On 2 April the 363rd Tactical Reconnaissance Wing was reassigned to Shaw from Langley AFB, Virginia, which placed two wings at Shaw. To circumvent this, the 20th FBW was temporarily "not manned" and the provisional 20th Tactical Air Division was created to accommodate both wings. In October the provisional Air Division was inactivated and the 363rd TRW became the parent organization at Shaw; the 20th FBW holding tenant status briefly.

The 20th Fighter-Bomber Wing and Group was reassigned to Langley AFB, Virginia on 19 November 1951 as a tenant organization, initially falling under the control of the 47th Bombardment Wing (Light), then being assigned to HQ TAC, then attached to the 49th Air Division. Upon arrival, the group began to receive new Republic F-84G Thunderjets. These aircraft were specially equipped to carry a nuclear weapon with a special electrical system and controls in the cockpit to aim and release the weapon. The mission of these aircraft was to carry small nuclear bombs and were designed, if necessary to deliver these weapons on Soviet forces if they invaded West Germany. Squadrons rotated deployment to Kirtland AFB, New Mexico for training in nuclear weapons delivery during Jan/Feb 1952.

In May 1952 elements of the Group began deploying to England, and the first elements of the 20th FBW departed Langley on 15 May for Goose Air Base Labrador, staging though Bluie West One, Greenland and Keflavík Airport, Iceland. After a week in transit due to weather delays in the Atlantic crossing, the 55th FBS arrived at RAF Wethersfield. The complete group arrived in England on 22 May.

Due to restricted space at Wethersfield, the 55th and 77th Fighter Bomber Squadrons along with wing headquarters were based there while the 79th FBS was moved to nearby RAF Woodbridge, three miles southeast of Bentwaters. Not manned, 1 November 1952 – 8 February 1955, during which period tactical squadrons were attached directly to the wing as the Air Force reorganized its wings into the 'tri-deputate' system.

The inactivation of the combat group in the 20 FW and combat groups throughout the USAF resulted in their World War II histories being lost. One must understand that "group" and "wing" are two distinct and separate units. Today's USAF wings wanted to retain the proud histories of the combat groups and requested that the groups be redesignated as wings. The request was denied, but it was decided to "temporarily" bestow the histories and honors of the combat groups. The "temporary" bestowals have remained in effect to this day.

=== The 1990s and twenty-first century ===
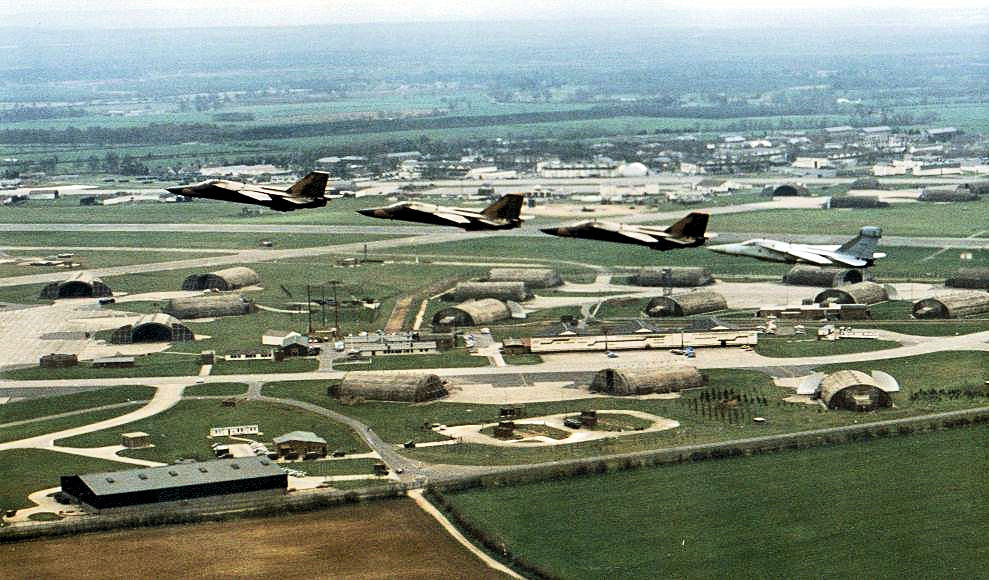
20th Operations group F-111s making one last flyover of RAF Upper Heyford, England, on 15 December 1993 upon their departure from the base

Incorporating the lessons learned during Operations Desert Shield and Desert Storm, the Air Force directed wing organizational changes that led to the Objective Wing Organization. Similar to the 1947 "Wing-Base Plan", the Objective Wing organized each operational wing with a combat (now called operations) group, as well as logistics, support, and medical groups, with most wing squadrons assigned under the appropriate groups.

The group was reactivated on 1 March 1992 as the 20th Operations Group and assigned to the 20th Fighter Wing. The 20th OG was bestowed the history and honors of the 20th Fighter-Bomber Group. The group was relieved of electronic combat mission on 1 July 1992.

Inactivated along with the wing upon the closure of RAF Upper Heyford on 1 January 1994, the group was reactivated at Shaw AFB, South Carolina the same day, absorbing the personnel and equipment of the 363rd Operations Group. This reassignment was part of a service-wide effort to preserve the lineage of the Air Force's most honored wings. The 78th Fighter Squadron activated on that day to join the wing, after having last been assigned to the 81st Tactical Fighter Wing at RAF Bentwaters, UK.

The squadron was inactivated once again on 30 June 2003, as part of the US Air Force's FY 2003 force structure changes, leaving Shaw with three F-16CJ squadrons.

The 20th provided forces in April 1999 for North Atlantic Treaty Organization's Operation Operation Allied Force in the European theater. A Shaw pilot deployed to Aviano Air Base, Italy, during the conflict shot down an enemy MiG-29.

For 10 years, the 20th FW and its F-16CJ squadrons flew contingency rotations in support of Operations Northern and Southern Watch. In 1999 the wing sent elements to take part in the Air War Over Serbia (Yugoslavia).

The wing also flew combat air patrols in the aftermath of the 11 September 2001 terrorist attacks on the World Trade Center and Pentagon. In February 2003, Shaw AFB sent approximately 1,300 service members and 15 aircraft in support of Operation Iraqi Freedom. Operations Northern and Southern Watch successfully culminated with the advent of hostilities in Iraq.

=== Squadrons today ===
The group flies the F-16CJ Fighting Falcon. Its tail code is "SW", and it consists of the following squadrons:

- 55th Fighter Squadron "Fighting Fifty-Fifth" also "Shooters" (chex tail stripe)

Organized on 9 August 1917. The "Fighting Fifty-fifth" has been awarded the Distinguished Unit Citation, Air Force Outstanding Unit Award, World War I Theater of Operations and World War II American Service Streamers, Air Combat European, Africa, Middle Eastern, Air Offensive Europe, and the Liberation and Defense of Kuwait Campaign Streamers.

- 77th Fighter Squadron "Gamblers" (red tail stripe)

Organized on 20 February 1918. In February 2003, the squadron deployed to Southwest Asia in support of Operation Iraqi Freedom.

- 79th Fighter Squadron "Tigers" (yellow tail stripe)

First activated in February 1918. In June 1999, the 79th deployed F-16CJs in support of Operation Operation Allied Force in the former Yugoslavia.

- 20th Operations Support Squadron "Mustangs"

First organized on 25 January 1943, as the 20th Airdrome Squadron. The squadron is responsible for all airfield activities and associated support of the 20th Fighter Group's fighter missions.

== Lineage ==
- Authorized as the 20 Balloon Group on 18 October 1927

Redesignated 20 Pursuit Group on 30 June 1929
Activated on 15 November 1930
Redesignated: 20 Pursuit Group (Fighter) on 6 December 1939
Redesignated: 20 Pursuit Group (Interceptor) on 12 March 1941
Redesignated: 20 Fighter Group on 15 May 1942
Redesignated: 20 Fighter Group (Twin Engine) on 30 December 1942
Redesignated: 20 Fighter Group, Two Engine on 20 August 1943
Inactivated on 18 October 1945

- Activated on 29 July 1946

Redesignated 20 Fighter-Bomber Group on 20 January 1950
Inactivated on 8 February 1955

- Redesignated 20 Tactical Fighter Group on 31 July 1985 (Remained inactive)
- Redesignated 20 Operations Group on 1 March 1992

Activated on 31 March 1992
Inactivated on 1 January 1994

- Activated on 1 January 1994

== Assignments ==
- Ninth Corps Area, 15 November 1930
- Fourth Corps Area, October 1932
- 3d Wing, 1 March 1935
- 1st Wing, November 1939
- 10th Pursuit Wing, 18 December 1940
- 4th Interceptor Command (later IV Fighter Command), 1 October 1941

Attached to: Third Air Force, c. February–September 1942
Attached to: Seattle Air Defense Wing, 28 October 1942-unknown

- VIII Fighter Command, 25 August 1943
- 67th Fighter Wing, 6 October 1943

Attached to: 1st Bombardment Division (later 1st Air Division), 15 September 1944 – 11 October 1945

- Army Service Forces (for inactivation), 16–18 October 1945
- Ninth Air Force, 29 July 1946
- 20th Fighter Wing (later 20 Fighter-Bomber Wing), 15 August 1947 – 8 February 1955

Attached to: 3rd Air Division, July–December 1950
Attached to: Tactical Air Division, Provisional, 25 April – 10 October 1951

- 20th Fighter Wing, 31 March 1992 – 1 January 1994; January 1994 – present

== Components ==
- 24th Pursuit Squadron: 15 November 1930 – 16 June 1932
- 55th Pursuit (later, 55th Fighter; 55th Fighter-Bomber; 55th Fighter) Squadron: attached 15 November 1930, assigned 15 June 1932 – 18 October 1945; 29 July 1946 – 8 February 1955; 31 March 1992 – 30 December 1993; 1 January 1994 – present
- 77th Pursuit (later, 77th Fighter; 77th Fighter-Bomber; 77th Fighter) Squadron: 15 November 1930 – 18 October 1945; 29 July 1946 – 8 February 1955; 31 March 1992 – 30 September 1993; 1 January 1994 – present
- 78th Pursuit (later, 78th Fighter) Squadron: 1 April 1931 – 15 June 1932; 1 January 1994 – 30 June 2003
- 79th Pursuit (later, 79th Fighter; 79th Fighter-Bomber; 79th Fighter) Squadron: 1 April 1933 – 18 October 1945; 29 July 1946 – 8 February 1955; 31 March 1992 – 30 June 1993; 1 January 1994 – present
- 87th Pursuit Squadron: 1 March 1935 – 1 September 1936

=== Stations ===
- Mather Field, California, 15 November 1930
- Barksdale Field, Louisiana, 31 October 1932
- Moffett Field, California, 19 November 1939
- Hamilton Field, California, 9 September 1940
- Blumenthal Field, North Carolina, 2 February 1942
- Morris Field, North Carolina, 18 April 1942
- Drew Field, Florida, 7 August 1942
- Paine Field, Washington state, 30 September 1942
- March Field, California, 4 January – 11 August 1943
- RAF Kings Cliffe (AAF-367), England, 26 August 1943 – 11 October 1945
- Camp Kilmer, New Jersey, 16–18 October 1945
- Biggs Field, Texas, 29 July 1946
- Shaw Field (later Shaw Air Force Base), South Carolina, 20 October 1946
- Langley Air Force Base, Virginia, 19 November 1951 – 22 May 1952
- RAF Wethersfield, England, 1 June 1952 – 1 June 1970
- RAF Upper Heyford, England, 1 June 1970 – 1 January 1994
- Shaw Air Force Base, South Carolina, 1 January 1994 – present

=== Aircraft ===
- P-12, 1930–1935
- DH-4, 1931
- P-26, 1934–1938
- P-36, 1938–1940
- P-40, 1940–1942
- P-39, 1942–1943
- P-38, 1943–1944
- P-51, 1944–1945; 1946–1948
- P-84 (later, F-84), 1948–1957
- F-100, 1957–1970
- F-111, 1970–1993
- EF-111, 1992
- A/OA-10, 1994–1996
- F-16, 1994 – present
