= RAF Woodbridge =

Former Royal Air Force station in Suffolk, England

RAF Woodbridge
- Near Woodbridge, Suffolk in England
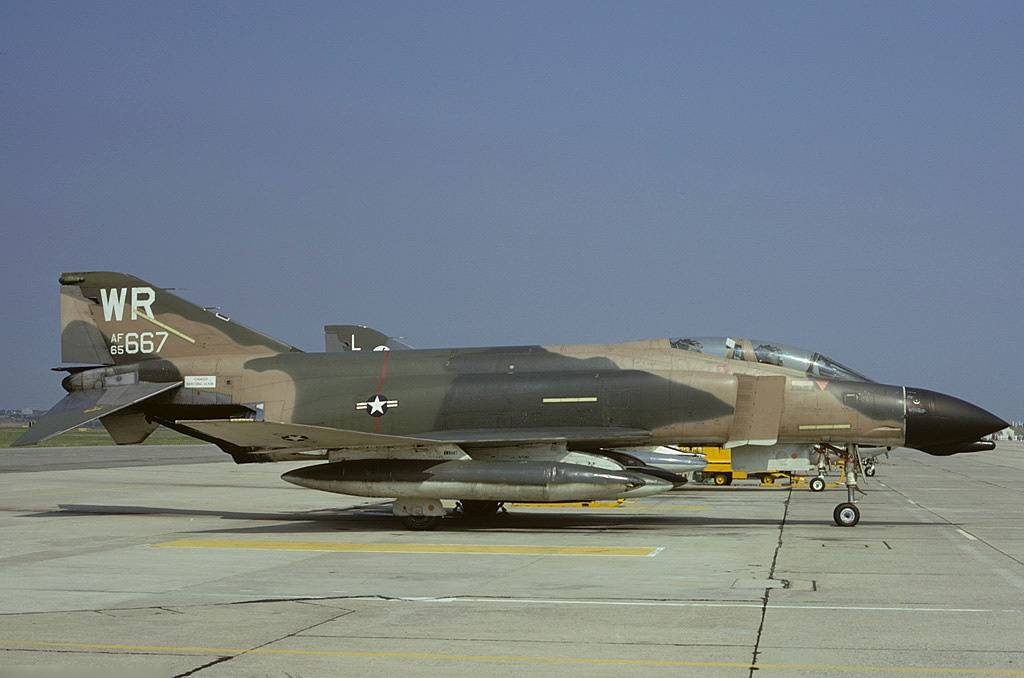
- A McDonnell F-4D Phantom II of the 81st Tactical Fighter Wing, August 1975.

Site information
- Type: RAF and US Visiting Forces flying station
- Owner: Ministry of Defence
- Operator: Royal Air Force (1943–1952); United States Air Force (1952–1993)
- Condition: Closed

Location
- Location in Suffolk RAF Woodbridge (the United Kingdom)
- Coordinates: 52°05′16.08″N 001°24′02.97″E
- Grid reference: TM330487
- Area: 369 hectares

Site history
- Built: 1943
- In use: 1943–1993
- Fate: Transferred to the British Army in 2006 and became MOD Woodbridge, comprising Rock Barracks and Woodbridge Airfield.

Airfield information
- Identifiers: IATA: WOB, ICAO: EGVG

Royal Air Force Woodbridge, or more simply RAF Woodbridge, is a former Royal Air Force station located east of Woodbridge and around 7 miles north-east of Ipswich, in the county of Suffolk, England.

Constructed in 1943 as an RAF military airfield during the Second World War to assist damaged aircraft to land on their return from raids over Germany it was later used by the United States Air Force during the Cold War, being the primary home for the 79th and 78th Tactical Fighter Squadrons and squadrons of the 81st Fighter Wing under various designations until 1993. For many years, the 81st also operated from nearby RAF Bentwaters, with Bentwaters and Woodbridge being known as the "Twin Bases".

Since 2006, it has been known as MOD Woodbridge, incorporating Woodbridge Airfield and Rock Barracks. Woodbridge Airfield is used by Army Air Corps aircraft for training and Rock Barracks are home to the newly formed 23 Engineer Regiment (Air Assault) of the Royal Engineers.

== History ==
=== Second World War ===
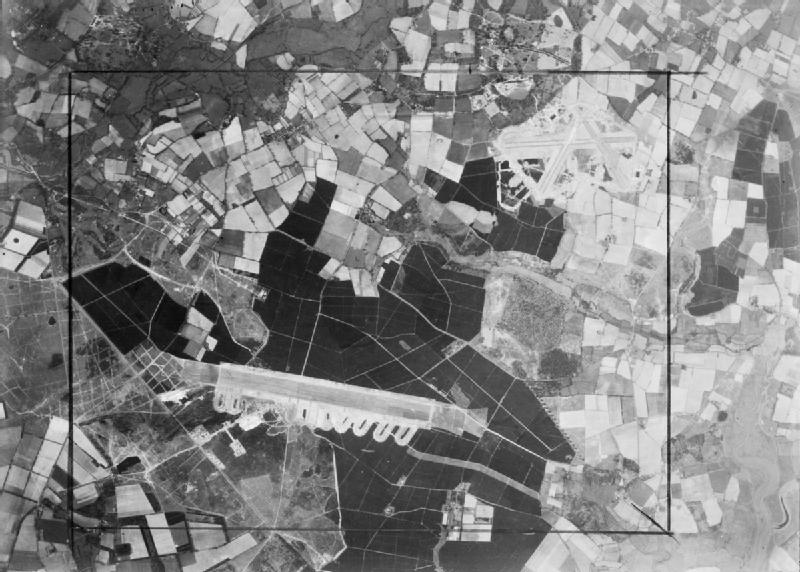
Aerial view showing Woodbridge ELG at lower left with RAF Bentwaters at upper right, World War II,

In 1943, RAF Woodbridge (initially called RAF Sutton Heath) was one of three airfields constructed along the east coast of England, set up to accept distressed aircraft returning across the North Sea from raids over Germany, and was therefore laid out with extra-long, extra-wide runways (the other two sites being at RAF Manston in Kent and RAF Carnaby in Yorkshire). These ELG (Emergency Landing Ground) airfields were intended for use by returning bombers suffering from low-fuel and suspected damage to their pneumatic (wheel brake) and/or hydraulic (undercarriage lowering) systems. All three airfields were equipped with a single runway, 9,000 ft (2,700 m) long and 750 ft (230 m) wide. (5 times the normal width) There was a further clear area of 1,500 ft (460 m) at each end of the runway. At each of the three airfields, the runway was divided into three 250 ft (76 m) lanes. The northern and central lanes were allocated by flying control, while the southern lane was the emergency lane on which any aircraft could land without first making contact with the airfield. The site at Woodbridge was chosen as it was 'nearly fog-free and had no obstructions for miles', although more than a million trees had to be cleared from Rendlesham Forest to take the new base. Its first use, however was in July 1943, when it was used by a Boeing B-17 Flying Fortress bomber of the United States Army Air Forces.

In the spring of 1944, Woodbridge was considered as a base for Operation Aphrodite, a plan to strip all interior equipment and armament from well-used B-17s, pack them with explosives, and fly them to difficult targets using radio-control equipment. In early July, several B-17s, modified into BQ-7 drones, from the 562d Bomb Squadron of the 388th Bomb Group arrived at Woodbridge. No Aphrodite mission was ever flown from Woodbridge because, after one aborted attempt, the unit moved up to RAF Fersfield, near Diss, Norfolk.

On 13 July 1944, a Luftwaffe Ju 88 G-1 night fighter of 7 Staffel/NJG 2, bearing aircraft code 4R+UR, on North Sea night patrol landed at Woodbridge. This aircraft carried recent versions of the FuG 220 Lichtenstein SN-2 radar, Naxos-Z and FuG 227 Flensburg homer which were being successfully used to intercept RAF bombers. The German crew had only just completed 100 hours of flight training, and had flown by compass heading, but had proceeded in exactly the wrong direction and thought they were over their own airfield. Within days, the Royal Aircraft Establishment (RAE) had analysed the radar equipment and devised countermeasures.

About 30% of the emergency landings were caused by bad weather, especially fog which could be dispersed by Fog Investigation and Dispersal Operation (FIDO) where up to 450,000 litres (99,000 imp gal; 120,000 US gal) of petrol per hour was pumped through a system of pipes along the side of the runway and burnt to produce a wall of flames which would lift the fog. Fuel was transported to Melton railway station before being piped to the airfield.

By the end of the Second World War 4,200 aircraft had made emergency landings at RAF Woodbridge. After the war the airfield was used for some experimental work by the RAF with Avro Lancasters being based there, dropping Grand Slam bombs on Orford Ness, and the Blind Landing Experimental Unit (BLEU) was located at Woodbridge. Eventually it was closed on 14 March 1948 and put into 'care and maintenance' status.

=== Cold War ===
==== 79th Fighter Squadron (1952-1970) ====
As a result of the Cold War United States Air Force (USAF) buildup in Europe, Woodbridge was made available to the Americans by the Air Ministry in early 1952. Expansion of the facility to bring it up to NATO standards commenced on 16 April 1952, with the establishment of the 3928th Air Base Squadron.

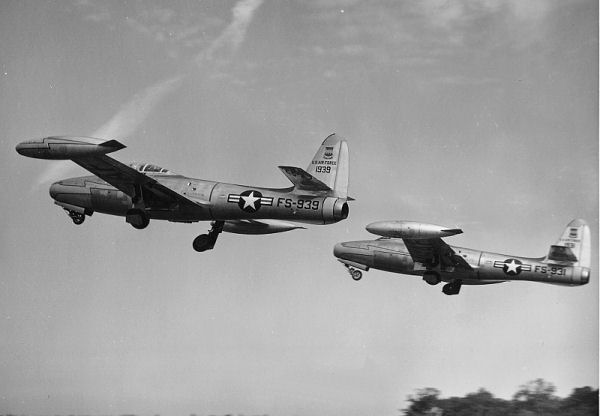
Republic F-84G Thunderjets of the 79th Fighter-Bomber Squadron, 51-9939 and 51-9931, taken in 1954.

The first operational USAF unit to reside at Woodbridge was the 79th Fighter-Bomber Squadron which arrived on 1 October 1952. The 79th FBS was a component of the 20th Fighter-Bomber Wing based at RAF Wethersfield. Restricted space at Wethersfield compelled the 79th Squadron to move initially to nearby RAF Bentwaters on 6 June, then to Woodbridge, on 1 October.

The 79th FBS flew the Republic F-84G Thunderjet. Markings for the F-84s at Woodbridge consisted of yellow lightning flashes on the fuselage and on the external wing tip tanks.

The mission of the 79th was to provide escort for Strategic Air Command (SAC) Boeing B-47 Stratojet rotational deployments from RAF Sturgate. These deployments generally involved about 45 aircraft, together with about twenty Boeing KC-97 Stratofreighters, which were maintained at English bases for 90 days. At the end of the Temporary Duty (TDY), they were relieved by another SAC wing that was generally stationed at a different airfield. These missions continued until 1964.

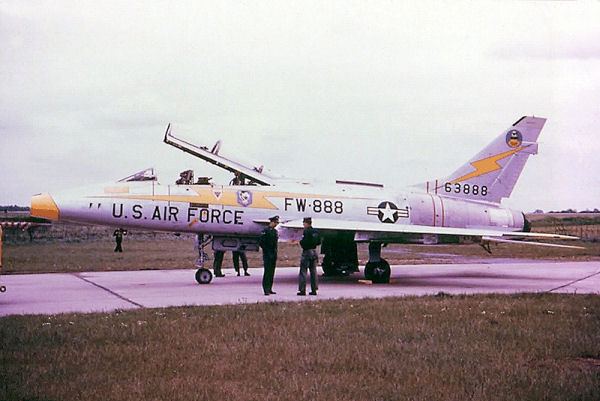
North American F-100F Super Sabre, 56-3888 of the 79th Tactical Fighter Squadron featuring yellow/gold lightning flashes on fuselage and tail. (taken at RAF Wethersfield, 1961)

In 1955, the 79th was upgraded to the swept-wing F-84F Thunderstreak, with the older "G" models being transferred to other NATO countries or to the Middle East. Lightning flashes were not painted on the "F" models, but the yellow squadron colour band around the extreme rear of the fuselage remained a squadron marking. The 79th flew the F-84F only until 1958 when the 20th was re-designated a tactical fighter wing (20th TFW), and the squadron (now 79th TFS) was re-equipped with the North American F-100 Super Sabre.

In January 1970 the parent unit (20th TFW) was reassigned from RAF Wethersfield to RAF Upper Heyford, allowing the 79th TFS to leave Woodbridge and re-join the other components at the new larger base.

It has been reported that the U.S. stored nuclear missiles at this site without the UK public knowing and that it was also the scene of a UFO sighting in 1980.

==== Twin Base with RAF Bentwaters (1958-1993) ====
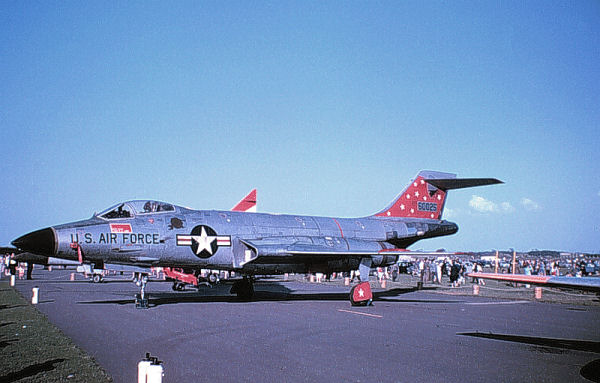
McDonnell F-101C Voodoo, 78th TFS, RAF Woodbridge ca 1960

Beginning on 8 July 1958, Woodbridge was operated as "twin base" (twin airfield) with RAF Bentwaters, and as a single unit with Bentwaters under the 81st Tactical Fighter Wing. Along with the 79th from the 20th TFW, the 78th Fighter-Interceptor Squadron operated from the station, being transferred from RAF Shepherds Grove when the USAF turned Shepherds Grove over to the Air Ministry.

Initially flying F-84F Thunderstreaks, in December they were replaced by the McDonnell F-101A/C Voodoo, and redesignated as a Tactical Fighter Squadron. Markings of the 78th TFS were a red tail with silver star pattern design on the vertical stabilizer.

In November 1965, the 78th TFS received McDonnell F-4C Phantom IIs to replace the Voodoos, with red fin caps as their squadron marking. In October 1969 the F-4C aircraft began to be replaced by the F-4D. In February 1970, USAF units adopted two-letter tail codes, with "WR" being used by the 78th, "WS" by the 91st, and "WT" by the 92nd. In 1972 this system was refined in accordance with AFM66-1, using a single code for all squadrons within a wing, such that all 81st TFW squadrons now displayed the same tail-code, "WR".

In 1972, construction began on Woodbridge American High School and classes began in 1973.

With the arrival of the Fairchild Republic A-10 Thunderbolt II in USAFE in 1979, the 81st TFW was expanded to six squadrons. Three of these were stationed at Woodbridge.

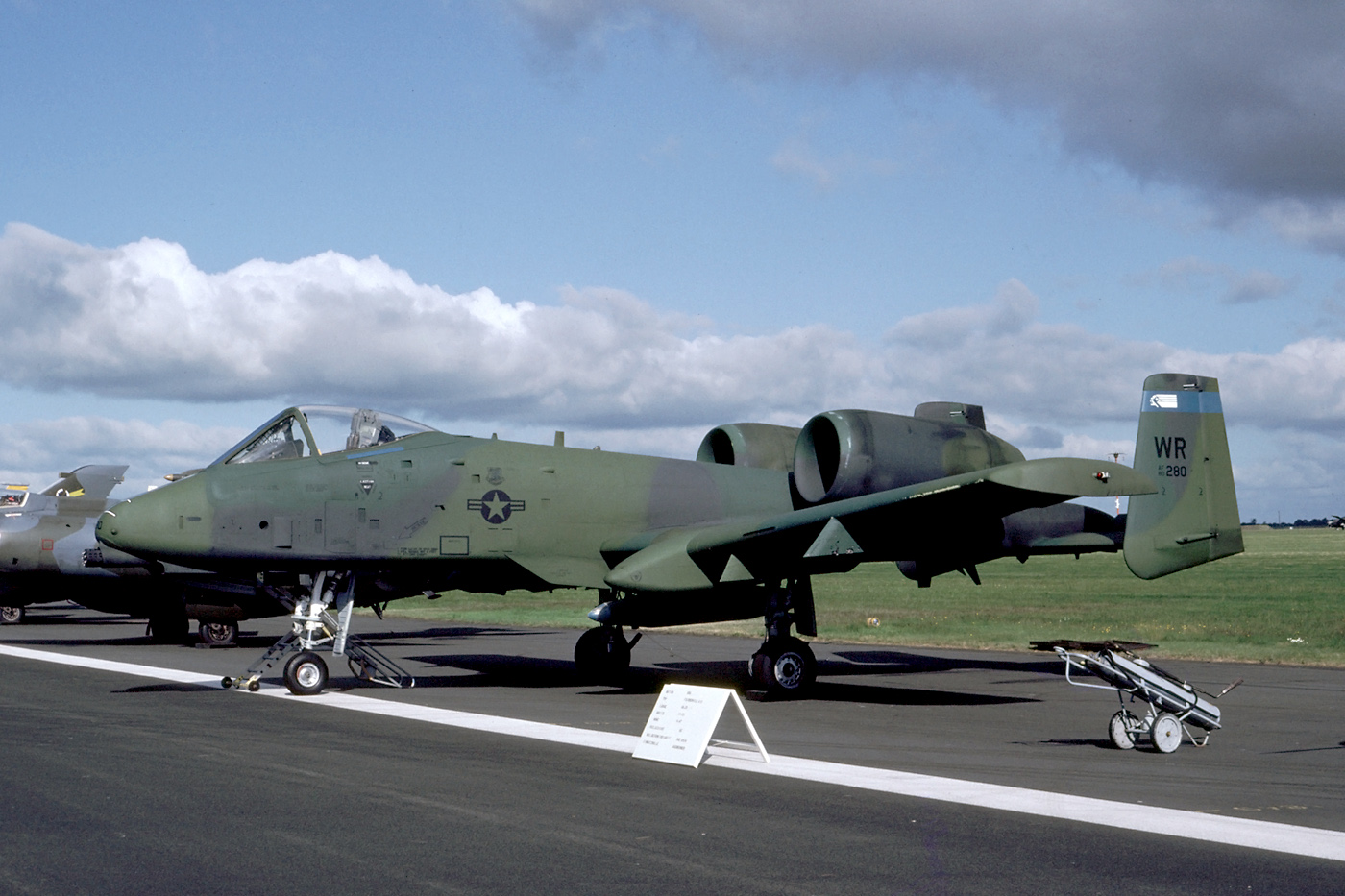
A-10A Thunderbolt II, 91st TFS, July 1985

It was decided to expand the 81st with six A-10 squadrons distributed over both Woodbridge and Bentwaters as follows:

- 78th Tactical Fighter (Red tail stripe) (Woodbridge)
  (Received A-10s 3 June 1979)
- 91st Tactical Fighter (Deep blue tail stripe) (Woodbridge)
  (Received A-10s 24 August 1979)
- 92nd Tactical Fighter (Yellow tail stripe) (Bentwaters)
- 509th Tactical Fighter (Reactivated as an A-10 squadron 1 October 1979; previously an F-102 unit at Clark Air Base, Philippines.) (Grey tail stripe) (Bentwaters)
  (Received A-10s 1 October 1979)
- 510th Tactical Fighter, (Activated 1 October 1978) (Purple tail stripe) (Bentwaters)
- 511th Tactical Fighter, (Activated 1 January 1980) (Black tail stripe) (Bentwaters)

All the A-10 squadrons were tail-coded "WR".

The 91st was transferred to Woodbridge from Bentwaters on 1 February 1980.

On 1 June 1988, the 509th was transferred to RAF Alconbury when the 10th Wing transitioned from a Tactical Reconnaissance to a Tactical Fighter Wing.

==== 67th Air Rescue and Recovery Squadron (1970-1992) ====
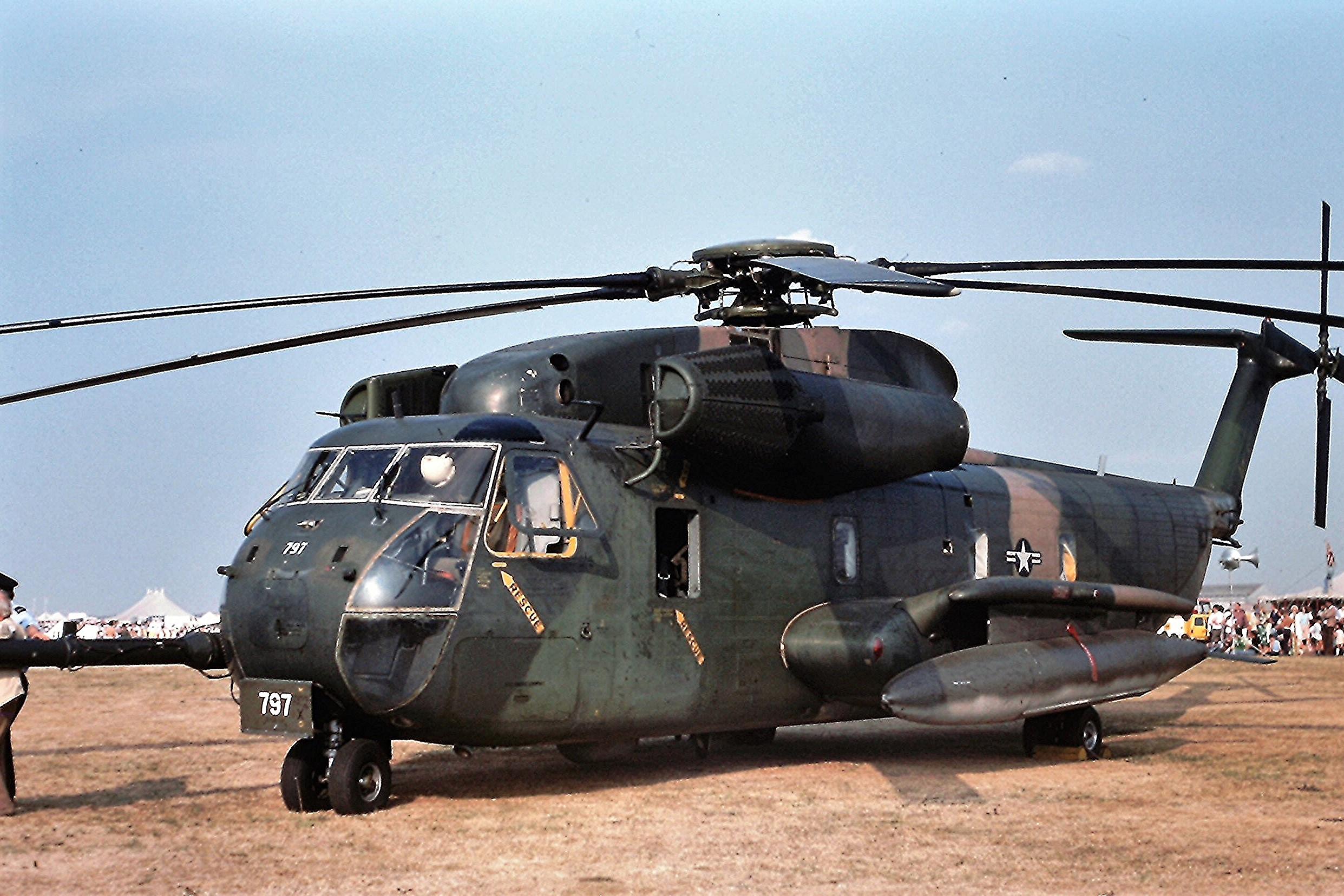
HH-53C Jolly Green Giant helicopter from 67th ARRS, at Coventry Air Show 1976

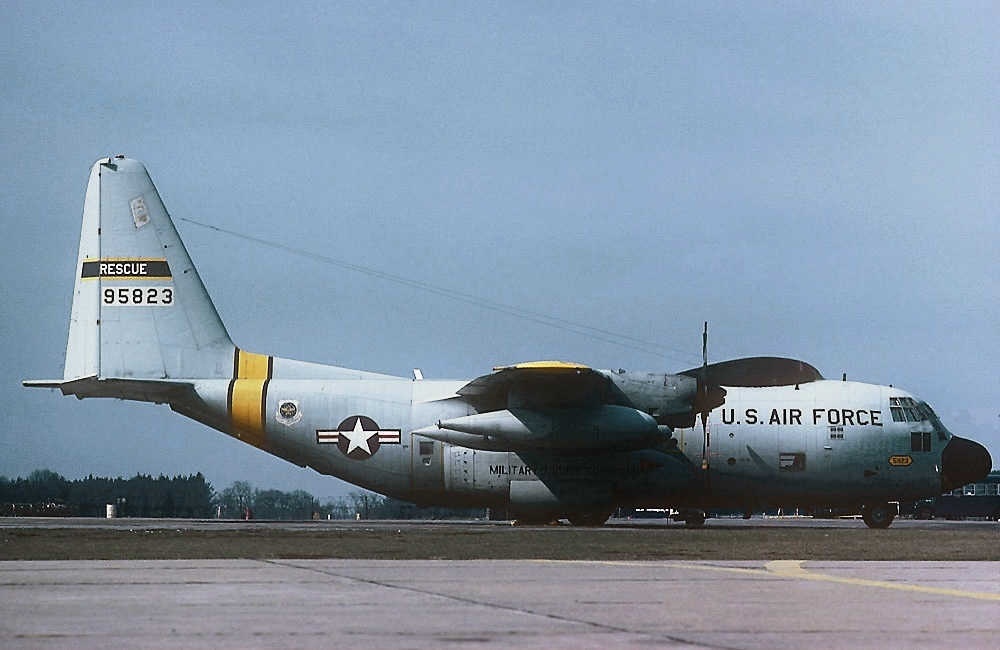
Lockheed HC-130N Hercules 69-5823 from 67 ARRS, at RAF Woodbridge, 1979

The 67th Air Rescue and Recovery Squadron (ARRS) moved to RAF Woodbridge from Morón Air Base, Spain, on 15 January 1970. The 67th ARRS operated Lockheed HC-130H/N/P Hercules fixed wing aircraft, and heavy duty HH-53 Jolly Green Giant helicopters, and was assigned an air rescue and special operations mission. The 67th ARRS participated in the rescue efforts of the capsized Townsend Thoresen ferry Herald of Free Enterprise outside of Zeebrugge Harbour on 6 March 1987. On 1 June 1988, they were redesignated the 39th Special Operations Wing. On 1 April 1992 they moved to RAF Alconbury as part of the closure of RAF Woodbridge.

=== Deactivation – 1990s ===
With the end of the Cold War, the USAF presence at Woodbridge was gradually phased down. It was announced that the airfield would be closed, and the 81st TFW would be inactivated. Woodbridge-based squadrons were phased-down as follows:

- 78th Tactical Fighter Squadron was inactivated on 1 May 1992. Its aircraft were sent back to the United States to various Air National Guard squadrons.
- 91st Tactical Fighter Squadron was inactivated on 14 August 1992. Its aircraft were sent back to the United States to various Air National Guard squadrons.

The last A-10 aircraft departed Woodbridge on 14 August 1993, and the airfield was closed as a US military facility. The 81st Tactical Fighter Wing was inactivated on 1 July 1993. With the inactivation, the USAF returned control of Woodbridge to the UK Ministry of Defence (The 81st was reactivated as the 81st Training Wing at Keesler Air Force Base, Mississippi on 1 July 1993).

== Current use ==
On 1 September 2006, RAF Woodbridge became Ministry of Defence (MOD) Woodbridge. The site is operated by the British Army and incorporates both Rock Barracks and Woodbridge Airfield.

The airfield is used by Army Air Corps aircraft for training and Rock Barracks are home to the newly formed 23 Engineer Regiment (Air Assault) of the Royal Engineers. The airfield is also regularly used to host track days, managed by companies such as Javelin Track Days.

During August 2016 a 1700m length of rough scrubland was cleared and a compacted earth runway created at MOD Woodbridge, for testing the Airbus A400M Atlas.

In November 2016 the Ministry of Defence announced that the site would close by 2027.

On 28 February 2019, defence minister Tobias Ellwood announces that MOD Woodbridge (Rock Barracks) would remain open, altering previous closure plans.

== In popular culture ==
RAF Woodbridge features as a setting in the 2017 video game Bomber Crew.

RAF Woodbridge features as setting and plot element in Julian Simpson's BBC4 2019 The Lovecraft Investigations The Whisperer in Darkness series.

== See also ==
- List of former Royal Air Force stations
- United States Air Forces in Europe
- United States Air Force in the United Kingdom
- RAF Bentwaters
- Rendlesham Forest Incident
