= 78th Attack Squadron =

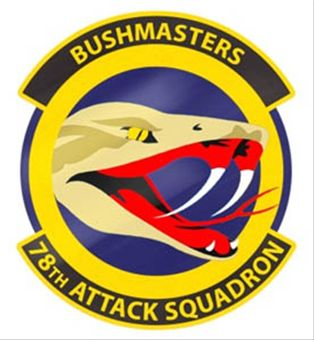
- 78th Attack Squadron Emblem
- Active: 28 February 1918 – 15 November 1918; 1 April 1931 – 1 September 1937; 1 February 1940 – 15 October 1946; 1 November 1952 – 1 May 1992; 1 January 1994 – 30 June 2003; 19 May 2006 – present
- Country: United States
- Branch: United States Air Force
- Type: Reconnaissance and Surveillance
- Part of: Air Force Reserve Command; 10th Air Force
- Garrison/HQ: Nellis Air Force Base
- Nickname: Bushmasters
- Engagements: World War I World War II; Global War on Terror
- Decorations: DUC AFOUA

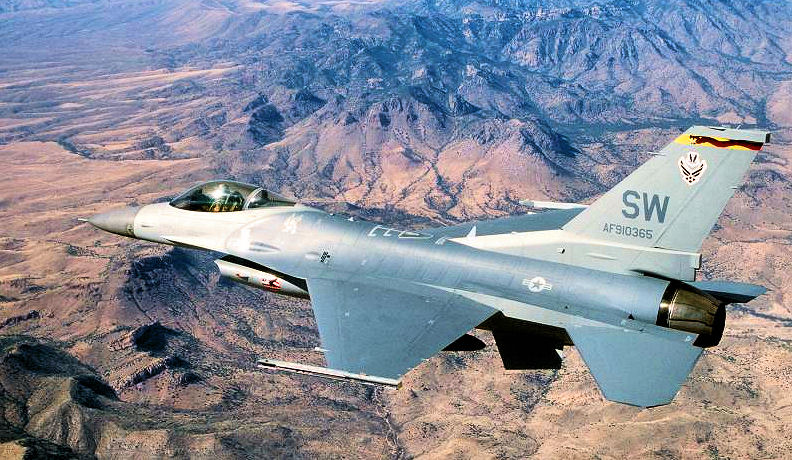
78 FS F-16C Block 50D, AF Ser. No. 91-0365, taken in 2002 over Arizona

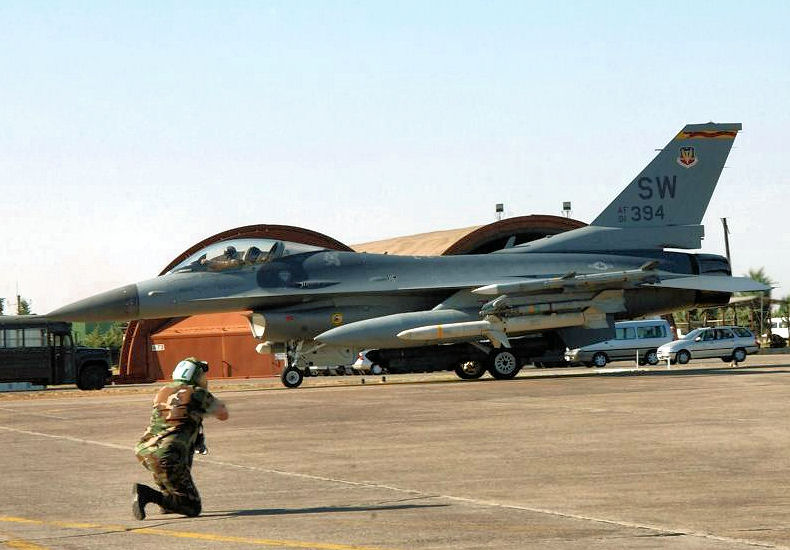
78 FS F-16C Block 50D, AF Ser. No. 91-0394, leaves on a mission in support of Operation Northern Watch from Incirlik AB, Turkey on 20 September 2002

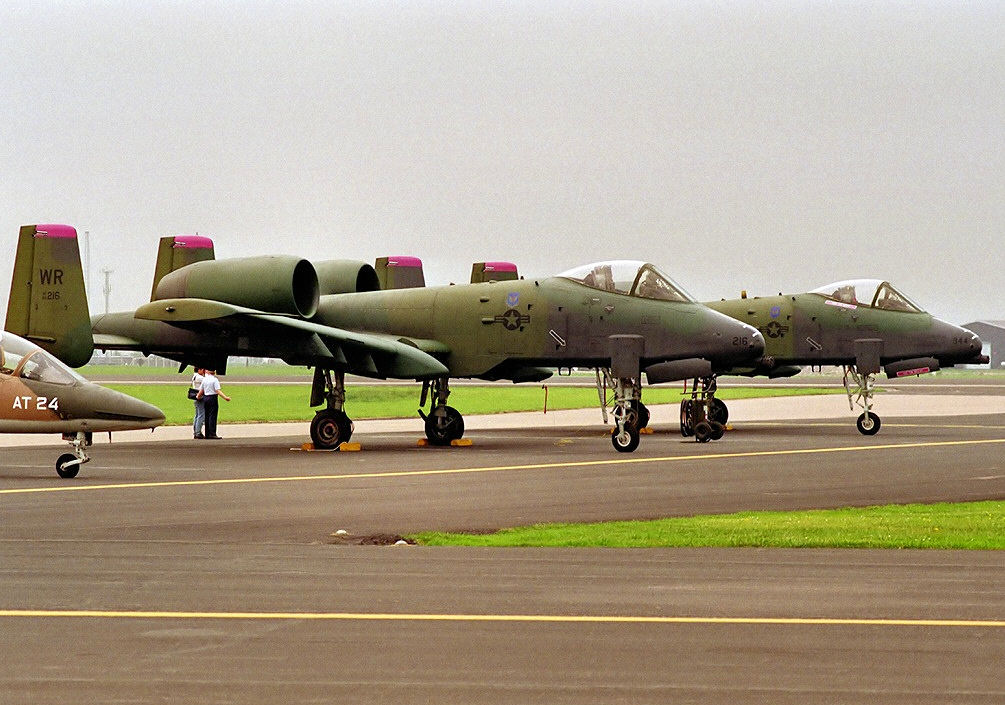
78 TFS A-10As at RAF Woodbridge

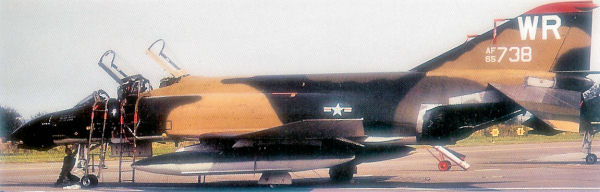
McDonnell F-4D-28-MC Phantom II, AF Ser. No. 65-0738 of the 78th Tactical Fighter Squadron, September 1972. This aircraft was retired to AMARC on 13 June 1990.

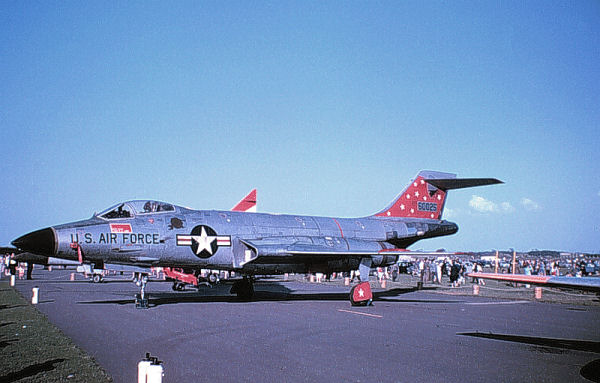
McDonnell F-101C-50-MC Voodoo, AF Ser. No. 56-0025, of the 78th Tactical Fighter Squadron. After its service in the UK ended in 1965, this aircraft was withdrawn from active USAF service. It was converted to an RF-101H unarmed reconnaissance aircraft and was assigned to the Nevada Air National Guard, then in 1971 to the Kentucky Air National Guard. It was withdrawn from service in 1979 and sent to AMARC for disposal.

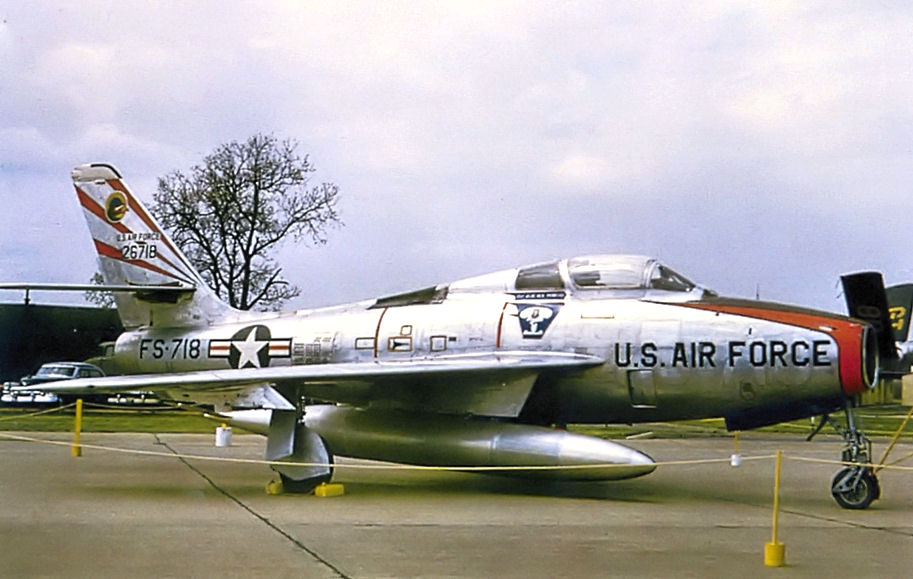
78th FIS Republic F-84F Thunderstreak – AF Ser. No. 52-6718

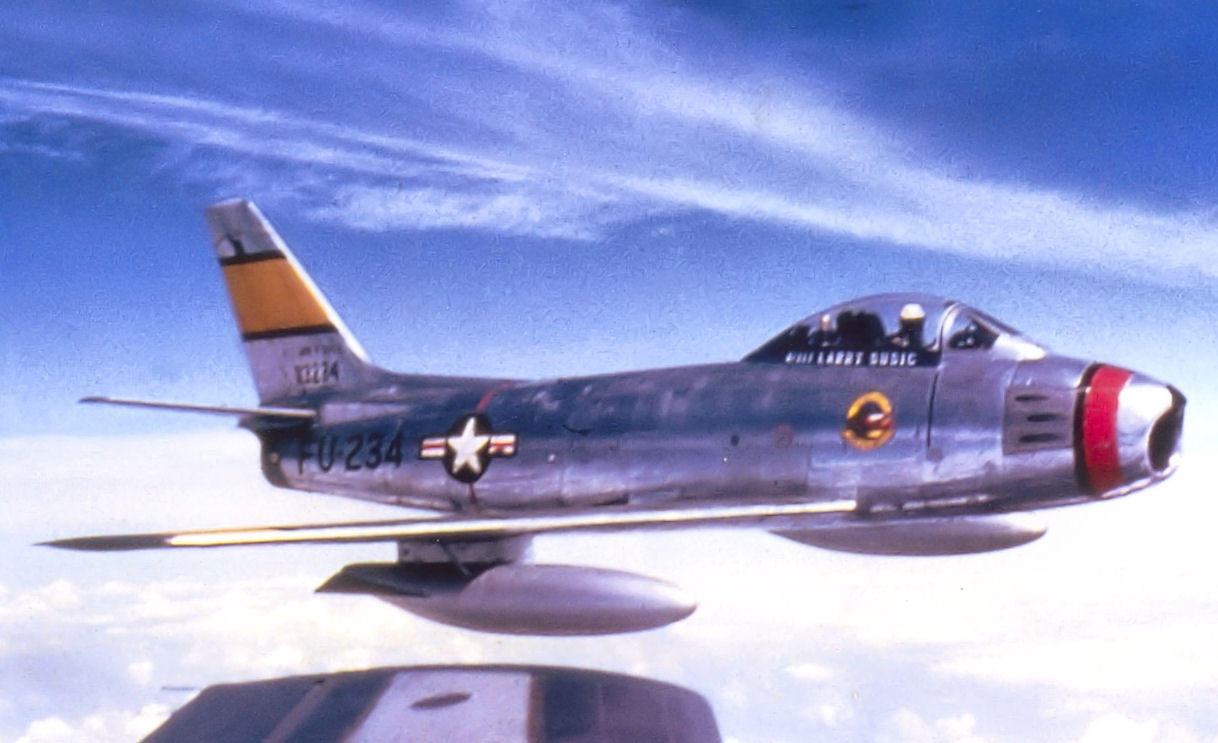
78th FBS North American F-86F Sabre, AF Ser. No. 51-13234

The 78th Attack Squadron (78 ATKS) is an Air Force Reserve Command (AFRC) unit under the 926th Wing, Nellis Air Force Base, Nevada and Tenth Air Force (10 AF) at Naval Air Station Joint Reserve Base Fort Worth, Texas. The 78 ATKS conducts operations from Creech Air Force Base, Nevada in conjunction with their active-duty associates in the 432d Wing.

== Mission ==
The mission of the 78th Attack Squadron is to maintain combat-ready Air Force Reservists to train and equip the Combat Air Forces to conduct Integrated and Expeditionary Combat Operations, as well as training operations, in the MQ-9 Reaper Remotely-Piloted Aircraft.

The squadron consists of RPA pilots, sensor operators and intelligence personnel integrated into Regular Air Force units within the 432d Air Expeditionary Wing at Creech Air Force Base, Nevada.

== History ==
The 78th was organized in 1917 at Rich Field, Waco, Texas as a training unit. In February 1918 moved to Hicks Field, Fort Worth, Texas before being demobilized. In 1931, the 78th Pursuit Squadron was again activated and assigned to the 20th Pursuit Group at Mather Field, California flying single-seat Boeing P-12 biplane fighters.

During World War II the unit was recognized and stationed in the Pacific theater where the unit flew P-39s, P-40s, and P-51s. With a combat record from the war of 200 enemy aircraft destroyed or damaged, versus the loss of only six aircraft assigned to the unit. The 78th received the Distinguished Unit Citation for actions at the Musashino Plant, Tokyo, Japan, on 7 April 1945.

On 1 November 1952 the 78th Fighter Interceptor Squadron was reactivated, flying F-86 Sabre aircraft as part of the 81st Fighter-Interceptor Wing. In 1954 the 81st became a Fighter Bomber Wing and the assigned squadrons began flying the F-84 Thunderstreak. Then in 1958, the 78th received its first F-101 Voodoo aircraft.

While flying the A-10 Thunderbolt II at RAF Woodbridge the squadron deployed to Incirlik Air Base Turkey in 1991, where it took part in Operation Provide Comfort. Later after inactivation and reactivation at Shaw Air Force Base and flying the F-16 Fighting Falcon, the 78th began a regular rotation of deployments to patrol the Northern and Southern No-Fly Zones of Iraq, the last of which took place in mid to late 2002, when they deployed to Incirlik Air Base, Turkey. The squadron also performed combat operations in Kosovo from March to June 1999.

The 78th was prepared to again deploy to Turkey in preparation for Operation Iraqi Freedom, however, the Turkish government denied the use of its nation as a staging area against Iraq. Consequently, the 78th stood down and was inactivated in June 2003. The personnel and F-16CJ equipment of the 78th transferred to the 55th Fighter Squadron.

In April 2006, the 78th was reactivated in the Air Force Reserve Command and redesignated as the 78th Reconnaissance Squadron, with the unit flying the MQ-1 Predator. In July 2010, with the gaining of the MQ-9 Reaper mission, the unit was redesignated the 78th Attack Squadron.

=== Lineage ===
- Organized as 78th Aero Squadron on 28 February 1918

Redesignated, Squadron A, Hicks Field, TX, on 23 July 1918
Demobilized on 15 November 1918

- Reconstituted, and consolidated (25 April 1933) with 78th Observation Squadron, which was constituted on 18 October 1927

Redesignated 78th Pursuit Squadron on 8 May 1929
Activated on 1 April 1931
Inactivated on 1 September 1937

- Redesignated 78th Pursuit Squadron (Interceptor) on 22 December 1939

Activated on 1 February 1940
Redesignated: 78th Fighter Squadron on 15 May 1942
Redesignated: 78th Fighter Squadron, Single Engine, on 20 August 1943
Inactivated on 15 October 1946

- Redesignated 78th Fighter-Interceptor Squadron on 11 September 1952

Activated on 1 November 1952
Redesignated: 78th Fighter-Bomber Squadron on 1 April 1954
Redesignated: 78th Tactical Fighter Squadron on 8 July 1958
Inactivated on 1 May 1992

- Redesignated 78th Fighter Squadron on 22 December 1993

Activated on 1 January 1994
Inactivated on 30 June 2003

- Redesignated 78th Reconnaissance Squadron on 19 April 2006

Activated on 19 May 2006.

- Redesignated 78th Attack Squadron on 1 July 2010

=== Assignments ===
- Unknown, 28 February-15 November 1918
- 20th Pursuit Group (attached to 6th Composite Group), 1 April 1931
- 3d Attack Wing (attached to 6th Composite Group), 15 June 1932
- 16th Pursuit Group, 1 December 1932 – 1 September 1937
- 18th Pursuit (later, 18th Fighter) Group, 1 February 1940
- 15th Fighter Group, 16 March 1943 – 15 October 1946
- 81st Fighter-Interceptor (later, 81st Fighter-Bomber) Group, 1 November 1952

Attached to 81st Fighter-Interceptor Wing, c. 22 April 1954 – 7 February 1955

- 81st Fighter-Bomber (later, 81st Tactical Fighter) Wing, 8 February 1955 – 1 May 1992
- 20th Operations Group, 1 January 1994 – 30 June 2003
- Tenth Air Force, 19 May 2006–present

=== Bases stationed ===
- Waco, Texas (1918)
- Taliaferro Field, Texas (1918)
- France Field, Panama Canal Zone (1931–1932)
- Albrook Field, Panama Canal Zone (1932–1937)
- Wheeler Army Airfield, Hawaii Territory, (1940–1941)
- Kaneohe Airfield, Hawaii Territory, (1941–1943)
- Henderson Field, Midway Atoll,(1943)
- Barking Sands Army Airfield, Hawaii Territory, (1943)
- Haleiwa Fighter Strip, Hawaii Territory, (1943–1944)
- Stanley Army Airfield, Hawaii Territory, (1944)
- Mokuleia Army Airfield, Hawaii Territory, (1944)
- Bellows Army Airfield, Hawaii Territory, (1944–1945)
- South Field, Iwo Jima (2 March-24 November 1945)
- Bellows Army Airfield, Hawaii Territory,(1945–1946)
- Wheeler Army Airfield, Hawaii Territory, (1946)
- RAF Shepherds Grove, England (1952–1956, 1957–1958)
- RAF Sculthorpe, England (1956–1957)
- RAF Woodbridge, England (1958–1992)
- Shaw Air Force Base, South Carolina, (1 January 1994 – 30 June 2003)
- Creech Air Force Base, Nevada (2006–present)

=== Aircraft operated ===
- JN-4 (1918)
- JN-6 Jenny (1918)
- S-4 (1918)
- P-12 (1932–1936)
- P-26 Peashooter (1940)
- P-36 Hawk (1940–1941)
- P-40 Warhawk (1941–1944)
- P-39 Airacobra (1942)
- P-47 Thunderbolt (1944–1945)
- P-51 Mustang (1944–1946)
- F-86 Sabre (1952–1955)
- F-84F Thunderstreak (1954–1958)
- F-101 Voodoo (1958–1966)
- F-4 Phantom II (1965–1979)
- A-10 Thunderbolt II (1979–1992)
- F-16 Fighting Falcon (1994–2003)
- MQ-1 Predator (2006–2016)
- MQ-9 Reaper (2010 – present)

=== Operations ===
- World War II
- Operation Provide Comfort
- Operation Allied Force
- Operation Northern Watch
- Operation Southern Watch
- Operation Enduring Freedom

== See also ==
- List of American Aero Squadrons
