= 55th Fighter Squadron =

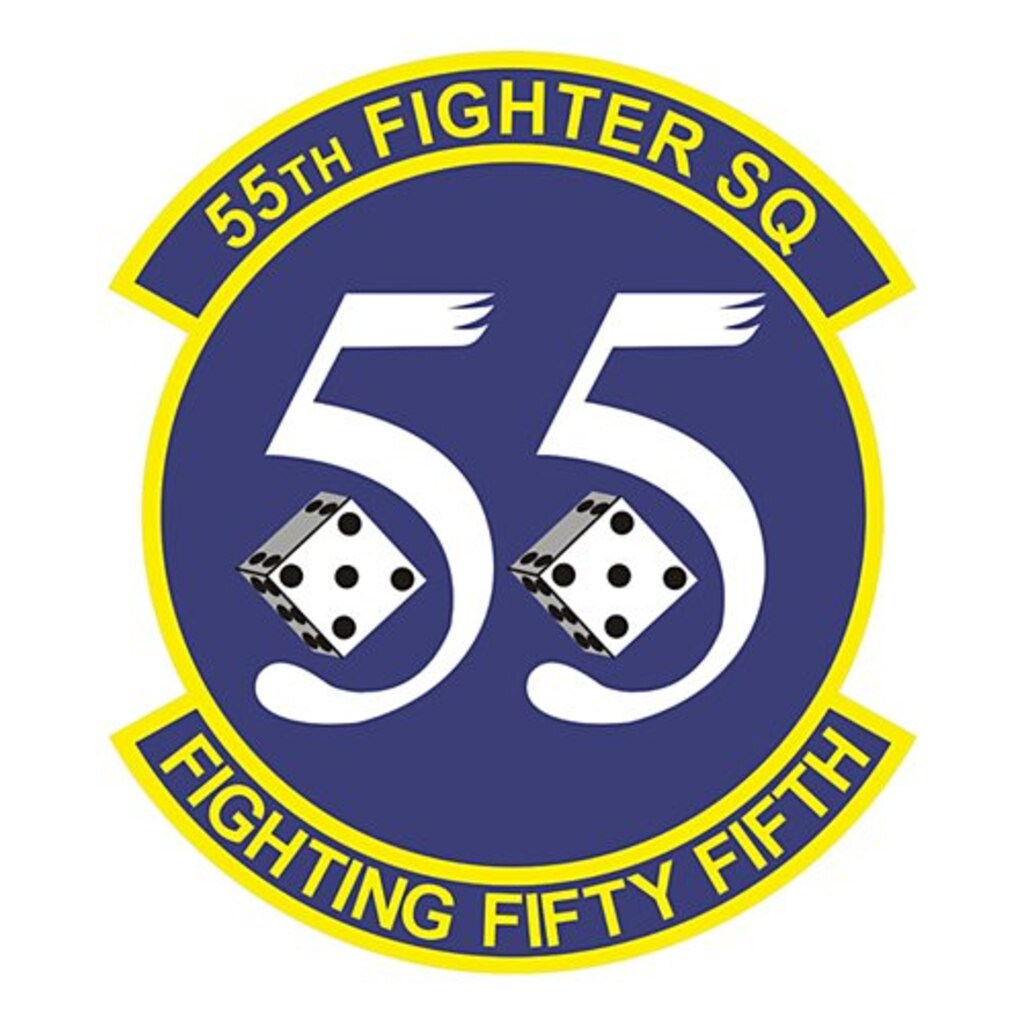
- Insignia of the 55th Fighter Squadron
- Active: 1917–1919; 1930–1945; 1946–1993; 1994–present
- Country: United States
- Branch: United States Air Force
- Role: Fighter
- Part of: Air Combat Command
- Garrison/HQ: Shaw Air Force Base
- Nicknames: Shooters, Fighting Fifty-Fifth
- Mottos: "Roll 'em!", "Shooters Roll!"
- Colors: Blue, White
- Mascot: Wild Weasel
- Engagements: Operation Overlord; Battle of the Bulge; Desert Storm
- Decorations: Distinguished Unit Citation; Air Force Outstanding Unit Award

Commanders
- Notable commanders: Gabby Gabreski

Insignia
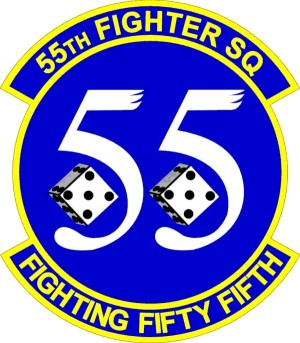
- 55th Fighter Squadron emblem (approved 28 October 1999)

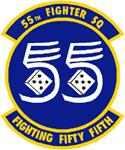
- 55th Tactical Fighter Squadron emblem (approved Jul 1991) (Note: The 55th Fighter-Bomber Squadron began use of this emblem in 1952, but the 1932 emblem remained the official emblem of the squadron until 1991, when this emblem was formally approved for the 55th Tactical Fighter Squadron. Endicott, p. 597)

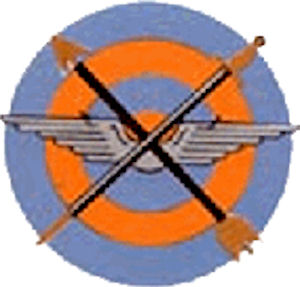
- 55th Pursuit Squadron emblem (approved 4 May 1932)

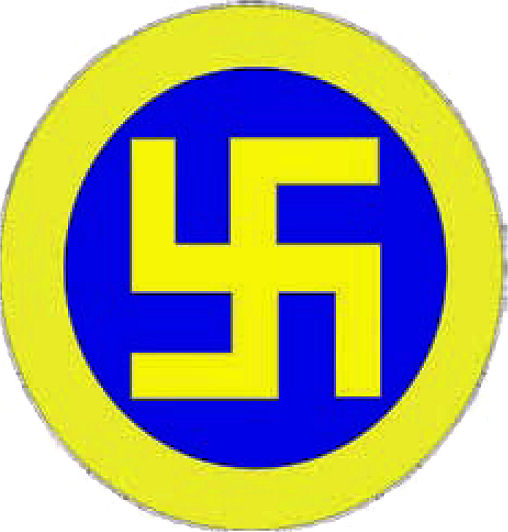
- 55th Pursuit Squadron emblem 1930-1932

The 55th Fighter Squadron is part of the 20th Fighter Wing at Shaw Air Force Base, South Carolina. It operates the General Dynamics F-16 Fighting Falcon aircraft conducting air superiority missions.

The squadron is one of the oldest in the United States Air Force, its origins dating to 9 August 1917, being organized at Kelly Field, Texas. It deployed overseas to France as part of the American Expeditionary Forces, as an aero construction squadron at the Third Aviation Instructional Center, Issoudun Aerodrome. The squadron saw combat during World War II, and became part of the United States Air Forces in Europe during the Cold War.

== History ==
=== World War I ===
The 55th Fighter Squadron's roots trace back to 9 August 1917. Originally organized as the 55th Aero Squadron at Kelly Field, Texas, by November the 55th Aero Squadron (Construction) was deployed to Third Aviation Instruction Center on Issoudun Aerodrome, France, then to the American Aerial Gunnery School in St. Jean de Monts on 16 May 1918. The squadron was demobilized on 6 March 1919, following World War I. The squadron was reactivated in November 1930, at Mather Field, California, flying Boeing P-12 aircraft, later joined by DH-4 aircraft in 1931. The squadron moved several times in the next decade, flying the P-26, Curtiss P-36 Hawk, and finally the Curtiss P-40 Warhawk at Hamilton Field.

=== World War II ===
At the beginning of World War II, the 55th sent its personnel to units fighting overseas and continued to train aviators for squadrons in Europe and the Pacific. In May 1942, it was redesignated a fighter squadron and switched to the Bell P-39 Airacobra, operating from several locations in the United States before acquiring Lockheed P-38 Lightnings.

The 55th was in the skies over Europe by August 1943, operating from RAF Wittering, England. The squadron flew 175 combat missions with the Lightning before acquiring the North American P-51 Mustang in 1944. With the rest of the 20th Fighter Group, the 55th flew daily strafing, long-range-patrol and bomber-escort missions. In June, they provided air cover during the allied invasion of Normandy.

As the war progressed, the 55th performed escort and fighter-bomber missions supporting the Allied advance through Central Europe and the Rhineland. In December 1944, the unit escorted bombers to their targets in the Battle of the Bulge. The squadron's 175th and last combat mission with the P-51 was flown in April 1945, the day after American and Soviet forces met at the Elbe River. The 55th was demobilized on 18 October 1945, after the war's end.

=== Cold War ===
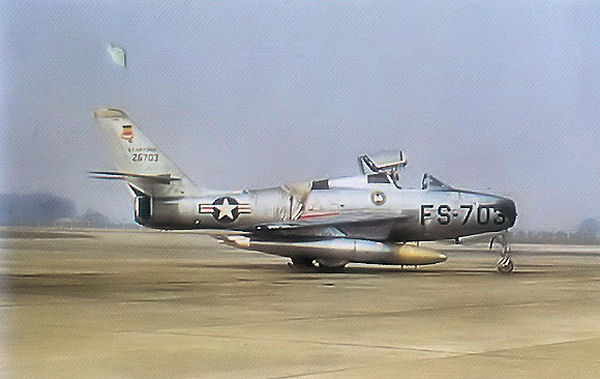
55th Fighter-Bomber Squadron Republic F-84F (Note: Aircraft is Republic F-84F-45-RE Thunderstreak, serial 52-6703.)

The 55th was reactivated on 29 July 1946, at Biggs Field, Texas, flying airpower demonstrations and training operations in the P-51. It entered the jet age in February 1948, switching to the Republic F-84G Thunderjet. In January 1950, it was redesignated the 55th Fighter-Bomber Squadron. The squadron returned to England at RAF Wethersfield in June 1952. The squadron switched to the North American F-100 Super Sabre in 1957 and in 1958 was redesignated the 55th Tactical Fighter Squadron.

The 55th moved with the 20th Tactical Fighter Wing to RAF Upper Heyford in June 1970. The next April, the 55th received its first F-111E Aardvark, becoming fully operational in November. Throughout the 1970s and 1980s, the 55th participated in several North Atlantic Treaty Organization and U.S. exercises and operations, helping contain Soviet threats to Europe.

In January 1991, elements of the 55th deployed to Turkey during Operation Desert Storm. They flew more than 144 sorties, amassing 415 combat hours without a loss. These missions neutralized key facilities throughout northern Iraq and helped to liberate Kuwait and stabilize the region. The squadron was inactivated in December 1993.

=== Modern era ===
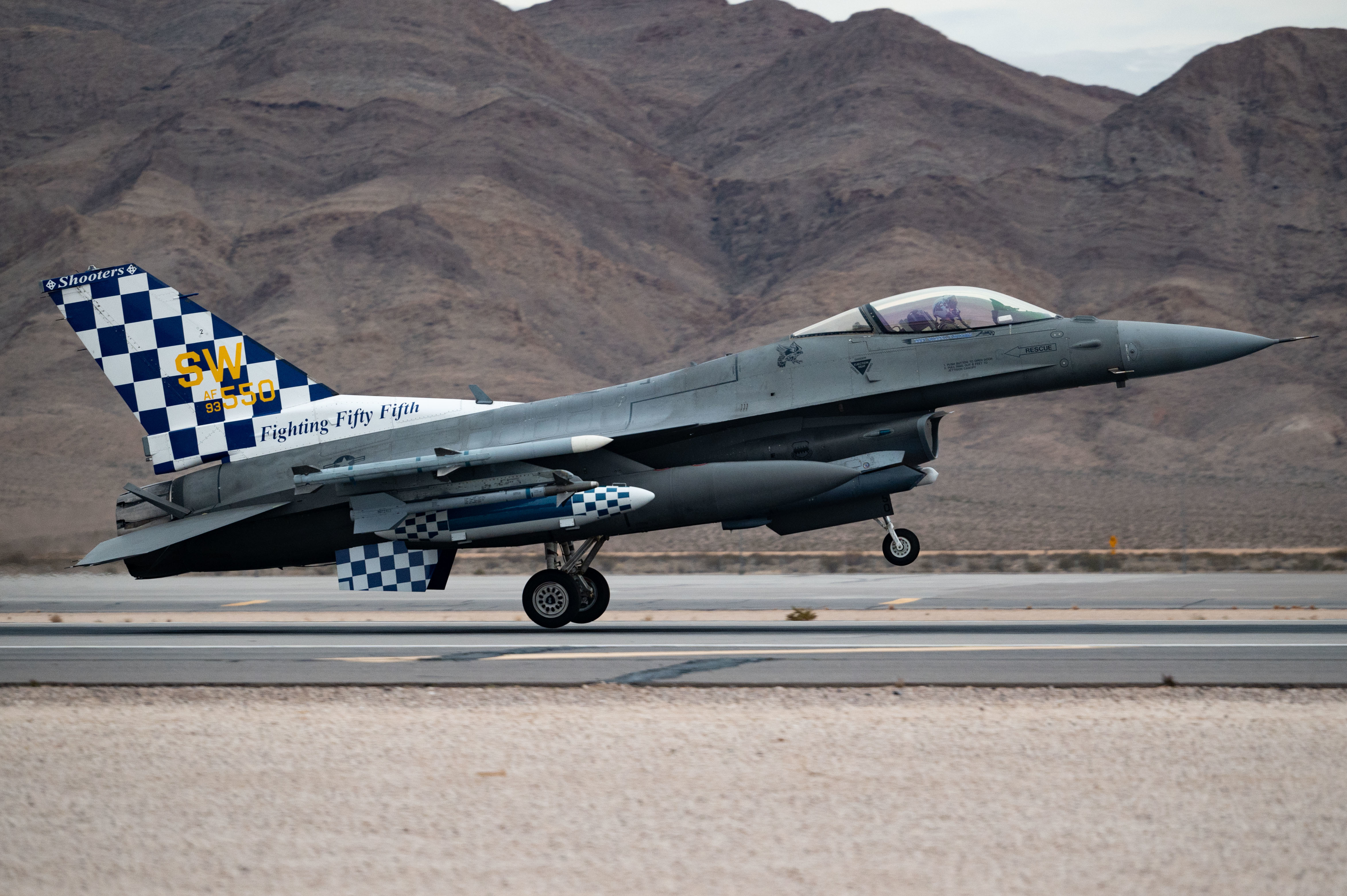
55th FS F-16C lands at Nellis Air Force Base

It reactivated again on 1 January 1994 at its present home, Shaw Air Force Base, flying the Fairchild Republic A-10 Thunderbolt II. In July 1996, the squadron transferred its aircraft to Pope Air Force Base, North Carolina, and stood down.

In July 1997, the 55th stood up as a combat-ready General Dynamics F-16 Fighting Falcon squadron in only 60 days. It has since made numerous deployments to Southwest Asia, operating against threats in Iraq.

The squadron has earned awards and recognition, including the David C. Schilling Award in 1999 and 2000, as well as the Air Force Association Citation of Honor.

In the summer of 2000, the 55th deployed to Southwest Asia for Operation Northern Watch. It followed that deployment with Operation Southern Watch in the fall of 2001, and in the winter of 2002, deployed again in support of Operation Northern Watch. In late 2008, the 55th deployed to support Operation Iraqi Freedom.

Six F-16 pilots from the squadron were awarded Distinguished Flying Crosses for Operation Midnight Hammer.

== Lineage ==
- Organized as the 55th Aero Squadron on 9 August 1917

Redesignated 55th Aero Squadron (Construction) on 25 August 1917
Redesignated 467th Aero Squadron (Construction) on 1 February 1918
Demobilized on 16 March 1919

- Reconstituted and redesignated 55th Pursuit Squadron on 24 March 1923

Activated on 15 November 1930
Redesignated 55th Pursuit Squadron (Fighter) on 6 December 1939
Redesignated 55th Pursuit Squadron (Interceptor) on 12 March 1941
Redesignated 55th Fighter Squadron on 15 May 1942
Redesignated 55th Fighter Squadron (Twin Engine) on 30 December 1942
Redesignated 55th Fighter Squadron, Two Engine on 20 August 1943
Redesignated 55th Fighter Squadron, Single Engine on 5 September 1944
Inactivated on 18 October 1945

- Activated on 29 July 1946

Redesignated 55th Fighter Squadron, Jet on 15 June 1948
Redesignated 55th Fighter-Bomber Squadron on 20 January 1950
Redesignated 55th Tactical Fighter Squadron on 8 July 1958
Redesignated 55th Fighter Squadron on 1 October 1991
Inactivated on 30 December 1993

- Activated on 1 January 1994

=== Assignments ===
- Signal Corps, 28 August–November 1917
- Third Aviation Instruction Center, November 1917
- Aerial Gunnery School, May 1918
- 2d Air Depot, November 1918 – February 1919
- Unknown, February–16 March 1919
- 2d Bombardment Wing, 15 November 1930 (attached to 20th Pursuit Group)
- 8th Pursuit Group, 1 April 1931 (attached to 20th Pursuit Group)
- 20th Pursuit Group (later 20th Fighter Group), 15 June 1932 – 18 October 1945
- 20th Fighter Group (later 20th Fighter-Bomber Group), 29 July 1946 (attached to 20th Fighter-Bomber Wing after 15 Nov 1952)
- 20th Fighter-Bomber Wing (later 20th Tactical Fighter Wing), 8 February 1955 (attached to 39th Tactical Group, (Note: Robertson calls this the "39th Tactical Fighter Group", but the organization never had this designation. Stephens, Maj Tonia (8 June 2017). "Factsheet 39 Air Base Wing (USAFE)". Air Force Historical Research Agency..) 31 August–23 October 1990
- 20th Operations Group, 31 March 1992 – 30 December 1993
- 20th Operations Group, 1 January 1994 – present

=== Stations ===
- Kelly Field, Texas, 9 August 1917
- Hazelhurst Field, New York, 21 September–13 October 1917
- Issoudun Aerodrome, France, 4 November 1917
- Saint-Jean-de-Monts Aerodrome, France, 16 May 1918
- Latrecey air depot, France, 6 November 1918 – c. 8 February 1919
- Garden City, New York, c. 4–16 March 1919
- Mather Field, California, 15 November 1930
- Barksdale Field, Louisiana, 31 October 1932
- Moffett Field, California, 19 November 1939
- Hamilton Field, California, 9 September 1940
- Army Air Base Wilmington, North Carolina, c. 22 February 1942
- Morris Field, North Carolina, 23 April 1942
- Drew Field, Florida, 7 August 1942
- Paine Field, Washington, 30 September 1942
- March Field, California, c. 1 January–11 August 1943
- RAF Wittering, England, c. 27 August 1943
- RAF Kings Cliffe, England, April 1944 – 11 October 1945
- Camp Kilmer, New Jersey, 16–18 October 1945
- Biggs Field, Texas, 29 July 1946
- Shaw Field (later Shaw Air Force Base), South Carolina, c. 25 October 1946
- Langley Air Force Base, Virginia, 19 November 1951 – 22 May 1952
- RAF Wethersfield, England, 1 June 1952
- RAF Sculthorpe, England, 9 August 1955
- RAF Wethersfield, England, 27 April 1956
- RAF Upper Heyford, England, England, c. 1 June 1970 – 30 December 1993 (deployed to Incirlik Air Base, Turkey 31 August – 23 October 1990)
- Shaw Air Force Base, South Carolina, 1 January 1994 – present

=== Aircraft ===
- Boeing P-12 (1930–1935)
- Dayton-Wright DH-4 (1931)
- Boeing P-26 Peashooter (1934–1938)
- Curtiss P-36 Hawk (1938–1940)
- Curtiss P-40 Warhawk (1940–1942)
- Bell P-39 Airacobra (1942–1943)
- Lockheed P-38 Lightning (1943–1944)
- North American P-51 Mustang (1944–1945, 1946–1948)
- Republic F-84 Thunderjet (1948–1957)
- North American F-100 Super Sabre (1957–1971)
- General Dynamics F-111 Aardvark (1971–1993)
- Fairchild Republic A-10 Thunderbolt II (1994–1997)
- General Dynamics F-16 Fighting Falcon (1997 – present)

== See also ==
- List of American Aero Squadrons
