= 20th Fighter Wing =

Active US Air Force unit

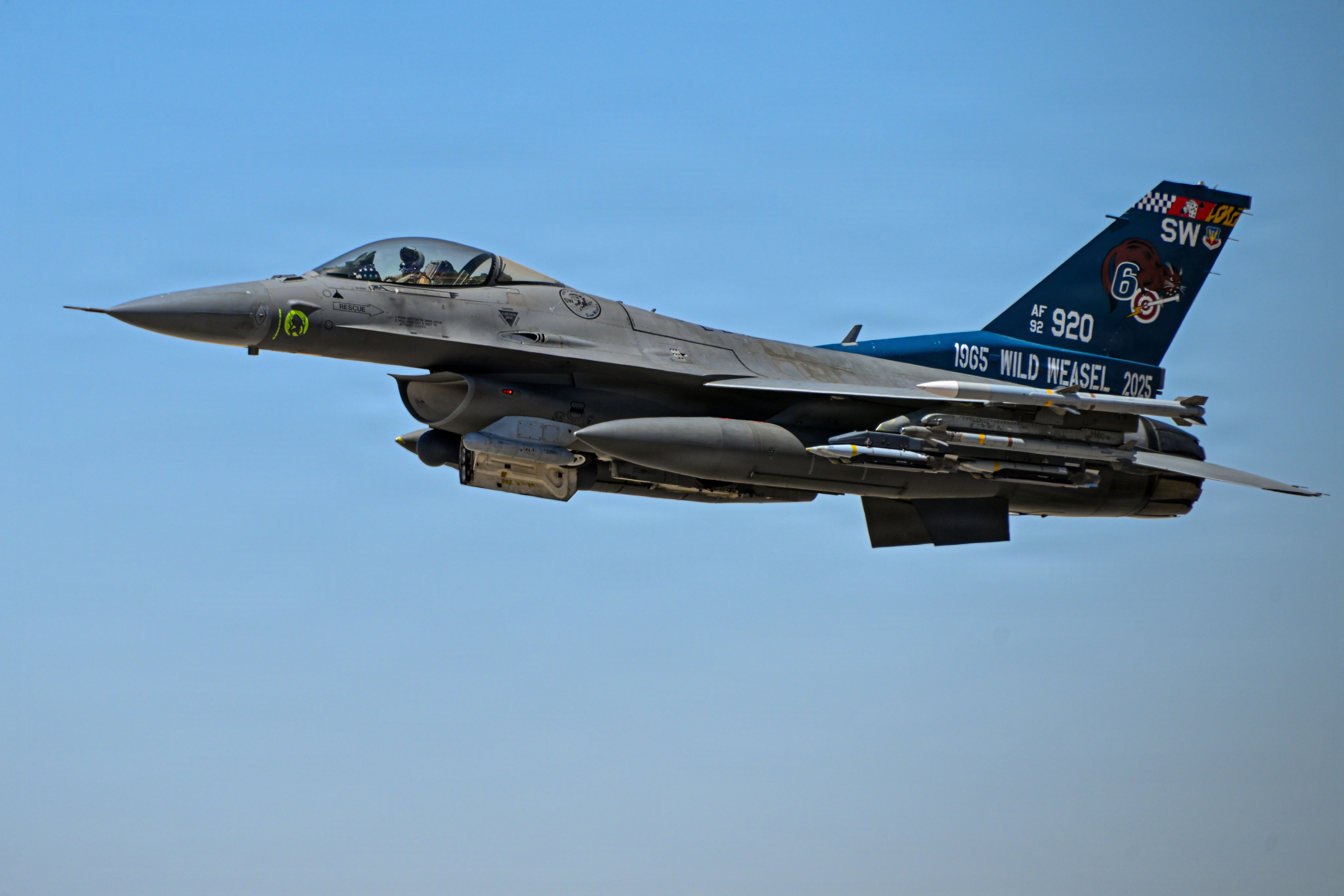
- 20th Fighter Wing F-16 Fighting Falcon
- Active: 1947–1948; 1948–present
- Country: United States
- Branch: United States Air Force
- Role: Fighter
- Part of: Air Combat Command
- Garrison/HQ: Shaw Air Force Base, South Carolina
- Motto: Victory by Valor
- Engagements: 1991 Gulf War
- Decorations: Air Force Outstanding Unit Award

Commanders
- Current commander: Col. Hugh E. Walker III
- Deputy Commander: Col. Brian D. Beears
- Command Chief: CCM Jarrod W. Getz
- Notable commanders: Merrill McPeak

Insignia
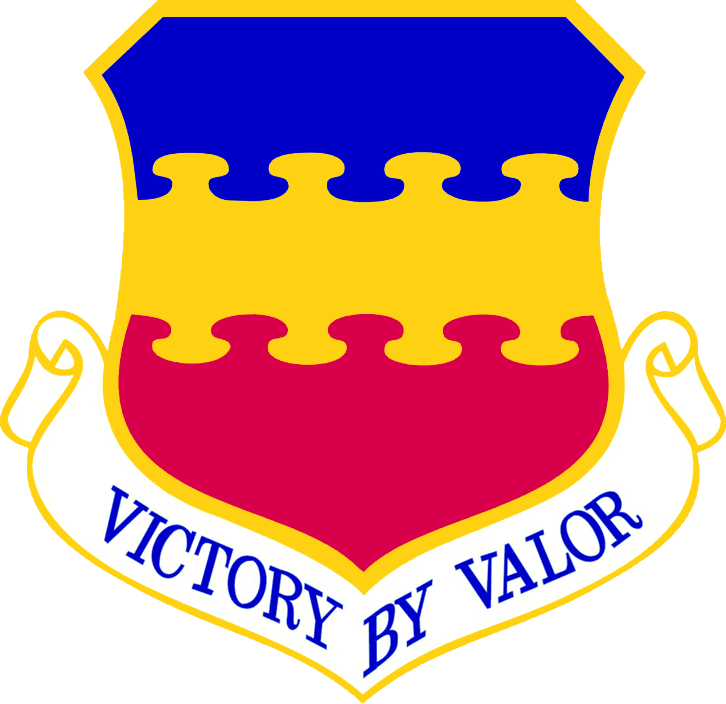
- 20th Fighter Wing emblem (Note: Approved 31 October 1951.)

The 20th Fighter Wing is a wing of the United States Air Force and the host unit at Shaw Air Force Base South Carolina. The wing is assigned to Air Combat Command's Fifteenth Air Force.

The wing's mission is to provide, project, and sustain combat-ready aircraft in conventional and anti-radiation suppression of enemy air defenses, strategic attack, counter-air, air interdiction, joint maritime operations and combat search-and-rescue missions.

== History ==
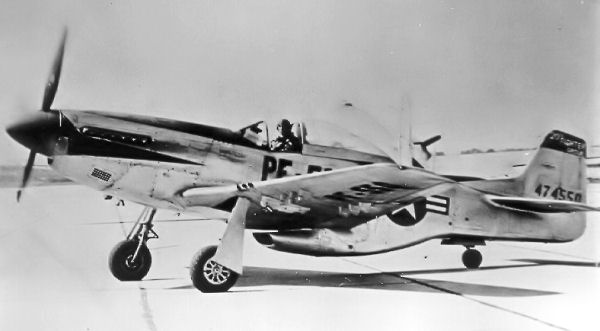
Group P-51D at Shaw (Note: Aircraft is North American P-51D-30-NA Mustang serial 44-74558 at Shaw Field. Note the postwar buzz number on the fuselage, and "20th Fighter Group" written on the tail cap.)

The 20th Fighter Wing was established on 20 July 1947 at Shaw Field, South Carolina and activated on 15 August. Upon its activation, the 20th commanded the functions of both the support groups as well as the flying 20th Fighter Group and the squadrons assigned to it. On 26 August 1948, the wing's 20th Airdrome Group was discontinued and its elements became realigned under the 20th Air Base Group.

On 15 December 1993, the flight line at RAF Upper Heyford was closed. The wing moved without personnel and equipment from the UK to South Carolina on 1 January 1994, inheriting the personnel and equipment of the 363d Fighter Wing.

Two F-16s from the wing collided during a training flight on 15 October 2009. One F-16, piloted by Captain Lee Bryant, was able to land safely at Shaw. The other plane, piloted by Captain Nicholas Giglio, 32, apparently crashed into the ocean. Authorities believe that Giglio was killed instantly in the collision and did not eject. An accident investigation board determined that the crash was caused by pilot error. The board stated that Giglio was flying too fast and was not paying adequate attention as he attempted to rejoin Bryant's aircraft for the return flight to Shaw.

== Units ==
The 20th Fighter Wing is composed of four groups each with specific functions. The Operations Group controls all flying and airfield operations. The Maintenance Group performs maintenance of aircraft, ground equipment and aircraft components. The Mission Support Group has a wide range of responsibilities, a few of its functions are Security, Civil Engineering, Communications, Personnel Management, Logistics, Services and Contracting support. While the Medical Group provides medical and dental care.

- 20th Operations Group

55th Fighter Squadron
77th Fighter Squadron
79th Fighter Squadron
20th Operations Support Squadron

- 20th Maintenance Group

20th Component Maintenance Squadron
20th Equipment Maintenance Squadron
20th Maintenance Operations Squadron

- 20th Mission Support Group

20th Communications Squadron
20th Contracting Squadron
20th Security Forces Squadron
20th Force Support Squadron
20th Logistics Readiness Squadron
20th Civil Engineering Squadron (20 CES)

- 20th Medical Group

20th Health Care Operations Squadron
20th Operational Medical Readiness Squadron

- 20th Comptroller Squadron

== Lineage ==
- Established as the 20 Fighter Wing on 28 July 1947

Organized on 15 August 1947
Discontinued on 26 August 1948 (Note: The experimental Table of Distribution 20th Fighter Wing was discontinued on this date. Ravenstein, p. 38.)
Activated on 24 August 1948 (Note: The permanent Table of Organization 20th Fighter Wing was activated on this date. Ravenstein, p. 38. The two wings were consolidated on 1 October 1984.)
Redesignated 20 Fighter-Bomber Wing on 20 January 1950
Redesignated 20 Tactical Fighter Wing on 8 July 1958
Redesignated 20 Fighter Wing on 1 October 1991

== Assignments ==
- Ninth Air Force, 15 August 1947 – 26 August 1948, 24 August 1948
- Fourteenth Air Force, 1 February 1949
- Tactical Air Command, 1 August 1950
- Ninth Air Force, 22 January 1951 (attached to: Tactical Air Division, Provisional, 25 April – 10 October 1951, Tactical Air Command after 6 November 1951)
- Tactical Air Command, 1 December 1951 (attached to 49th Air Division after 12 February 1952)
- United States Air Forces in Europe, 31 May 1952 (remained attached to 49th Air Division)
- Third Air Force, 5 June 1952 (remained attached to 49th Air Division until 1 July 1956)
- Seventeenth Air Force, 1 July 1961
- Third Air Force, 1 September 1963 – 1 January 1994
- Ninth Air Force, 1 January 1994 – 2009
- Ninth Air Force, 5 August 2009 – 2020
- Fifteenth Air Force, 2020 - present

== Flying components ==
Group

- 20th Fighter Group (later 20 Fighter-Bomber Group, 20 Operations Group): 15 August 1947 – 26 August 1948, 14 August 1948 – 8 February 1955; 31 March 1992 – 1 January 1994; 1 January 1994 – present (detached 26 July-c. 17 December 1950 and 25 April – 10 October 1951)
- 20th Maint, Mission Support Groups etc

Squadrons

- 42d Electronic Combat Squadron: assigned 1 July 1983 – 1 June 1985, attached 2 June 1985 – 24 January 1991, assigned 25 January 1991 – 1 July 1992.
- 55th Fighter-Bomber Squadron (later 55th Tactical Fighter Squadron, 55th Fighter Squadron): attached 15 November 1952 – 7 February 1955, assigned 8 February 1955 – 31 March 1992
- 77th Fighter-Bomber Squadron (later 77th Tactical Fighter Squadron, 77th Fighter Squadron): attached 15 November 1952 – 7 February 1955, assigned 8 February 1955 – 31 March 1992
- 79th Fighter-Bomber Squadron (later 79th Tactical Fighter Squadron, 79th Fighter Squadron): attached 15 November 1952 – 7 February 1955, assigned 8 February 1955 – 31 March 1992

== Stations ==
- Shaw Field (later Shaw Air Force Base), South Carolina, 15 August 1947 – 26 August 1948, 24 August 1948 – 9 November 1951
- Langley Air Force Base, Virginia, 9 November 1951 – 22 May 1952
- RAF Wethersfield, England, 31 May 1952 – 1 April 1970
- RAF Woodbridge, England, 1 October 1954 – 1 April 1970 (79th only)
- RAF Upper Heyford, England, 1 April 1970 – 1 January 1994
- Shaw Air Force Base, South Carolina, 1 January 1994 – present

== Aircraft operated ==
- Republic F-84B/D/G Thunderjet (1948–1955)
- Republic F-84F Thunderstreak (1955–1957)
- North American F-100D Super Sabre (1957–1971)
- General Dynamics F-111 Aardvark (1970–1993)
- General Dynamics–Grumman EF-111A Raven (1984–1992)
- General Dynamics F-16 Fighting Falcon, 1994 – present

== Awards ==
- Air Force Outstanding Unit Award, 1 June 1999 - 31 May 2001
- Air Force Outstanding Unit Award, 1 June 2013 - 31 May 2014
- Air Force Outstanding Unit Award, 1 June 2014 - 31 May 2015
- Air Force Meritorious Unit Award, 1 June 2018 - 31 May 2020
