= Cherbourg–Maupertus Airport =

Cherbourg–Manche Airport Aéroport de Cherbourg–Manche
- IATA: CER; ICAO: LFRC

Summary
- Airport type: Public
- Owner: Departmental Council of Manche
- Operator: Edéis
- Serves: Cherbourg-en-Cotentin
- Location: Maupertus-sur-Mer
- Built: 1937
- Elevation AMSL: 459 ft (140 m)
- Coordinates: 49°39′03″N 001°28′31″W
- Website: cherbourg.aeroport.fr

Map
- Location of Cherbourg–Manche Airport

Runways
Direction	Length		Surface
Direction	m	ft	Surface
10/28	2,440	8,005	Asphalt
- Source: French AIP

For the military use of this facility, see: Maupertus-sur-Mer Airfield

Cherbourg–Manche Airport or Aéroport de Cherbourg–Manche (IATA: CER, ICAO: LFRC) is an airport located 11 km east of Cherbourg-en-Cotentin, between Maupertus-sur-Mer and Gonneville-le-Theil. These are all communes of the Manche département in the Normandy région of France. The airport is managed by SNC-Lavalin Airports (subsidiary of the large Canadian engineering firm SNC-Lavalin) since 1 October 2009.

It has one runway, runway 10/28. It is 2440 metres long and is covered in asphalt. There are six bays, numbered N1 to N6. There are currently no scheduled flights operating to or from the airport. Until early 2008 there was one scheduled flight a day from Paris to Jersey via Cherbourg although this has now been withdrawn.

Charter flights occasionally operate to and from the airport.

== History ==
The airport was first built in 1937 as a French Air Force military airfield. It was captured and used by the German Luftwaffe during the Occupation of France, and seized by the United States Army on 27 June 1944 during the liberation of the Cherbourg area. It was used as a fighter and bomber airfield by the United States Army Air Forces in 1944. After the Americans moved east into Central France with the advancing Allied Armies, the airfield was used as a resupply and casualty evacuation airfield for several months, before being closed on 22 December 1944. It was then turned over to French authorities.

== 75th D-Day commemorations ==
June 2019 saw the airport being used for the temporary basing of C-47 Skytrain/Dakota, DC-3, USAF MC-130J & C-130's for the 75th D-Day commemorative air drops.

== Airlines and destinations ==
No destinations served at present, as Twin Jet dropped services to Jersey and Paris Orly followed by Chalair and also Airlinair (who had taken over the service to Paris), which both failed to make links to Paris profitable. The nearest airports are Caen–Carpiquet Airport, located 118 km (73 mi) south east and Rennes - Saint-Jacques Airport, located 241 km (150 mi) south west of Cherbourg-en-Cotentin Airport.
