= 9th Reconnaissance Squadron (disambiguation) =

9th Reconnaissance Squadron may refer to:

- The 9th Tactical Reconnaissance Squadron, part of the lineage of the modern United States Air Force's 9th Combat Operations Squadron
- The 495th Tactical Fighter Squadron, designated 9th Reconnaissance Squadron (Light) from January 1941 to August 1941
- The 488th Fighter Squadron, designated 9th Reconnaissance Squadron (Fighter) from April 1943 to August 1943
- The 9th Combat Operations Squadron, formerly the 9th Space Operations Squadron, previously designated 9th Reconnaissance Squadron, Very Long Range (Photographic) from June 1946 to October 1947
- The 99th Air Refueling Squadron, constituted as the 9th Reconnaissance Squadron (Heavy), but redesignated before activation

== See also ==
- 9th Weather Reconnaissance Squadron (Provisional), a provisional organization providing weather information for Ninth Air Force units from June 1944 to June 1945, flying from bases in France
