= 363rd Intelligence, Surveillance and Reconnaissance Wing =

US Air Force unit

363d Intelligence, Surveillance and Reconnaissance Wing

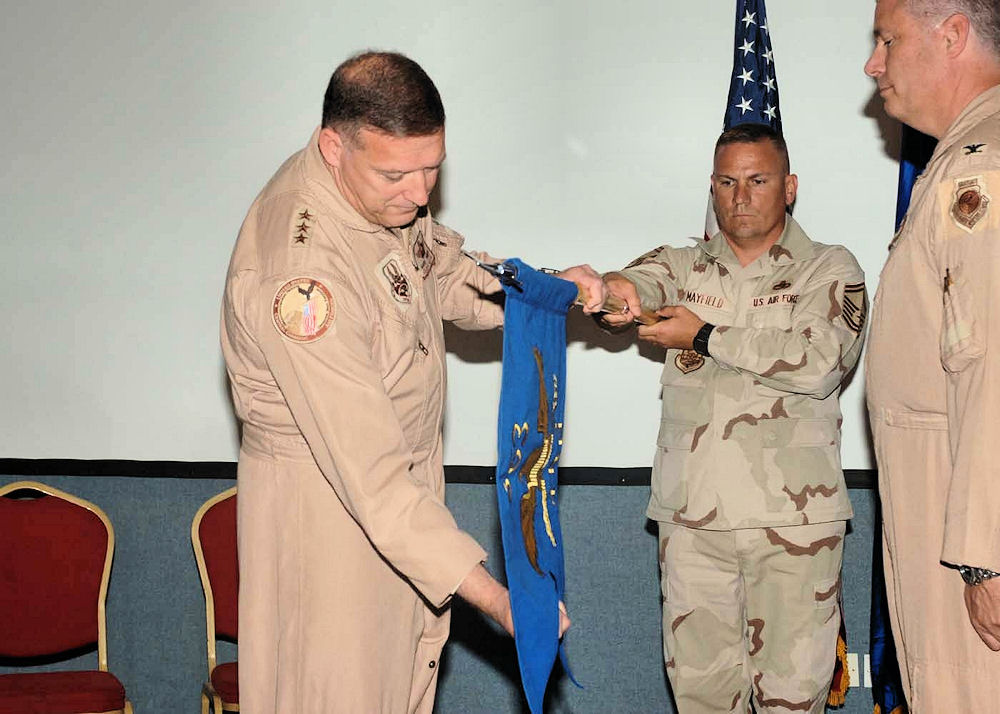
- Activation ceremony of the 363d Training Group, the wing's predecessor, in 2007
- Active: 1947–1948; 1948–1949; 1950–1993; 1998–2003; 2007–2011; 2015–present
- Country: United States
- Branch: United States Air Force
- Type: Wing
- Role: Intelligence, surveillance and reconnaissance
- Part of: Air Combat Command: Sixteenth Air Force
- Garrison/HQ: Joint Base Langley-Eustis, Virginia.
- Motto: Voir c'est savoir (French for 'To See is to Know')
- Engagements: Operation Desert Storm: Defense of Saudi Arabia; Liberation and Defense of Kuwait; Global war on terrorism

- Decorations: Air Force Meritorious Unit Award (3x) Air Force Outstanding Unit Award with Combat "V" Device (4x); Air Force Outstanding Unit Award (9x)

Commanders
- Current commander: Col. Catherine A. Gambold
- Deputy Commander: Col. Christopher G. Gibbs
- Command Chief: Command Chief Master Sergeant Karen L. Grider

Insignia
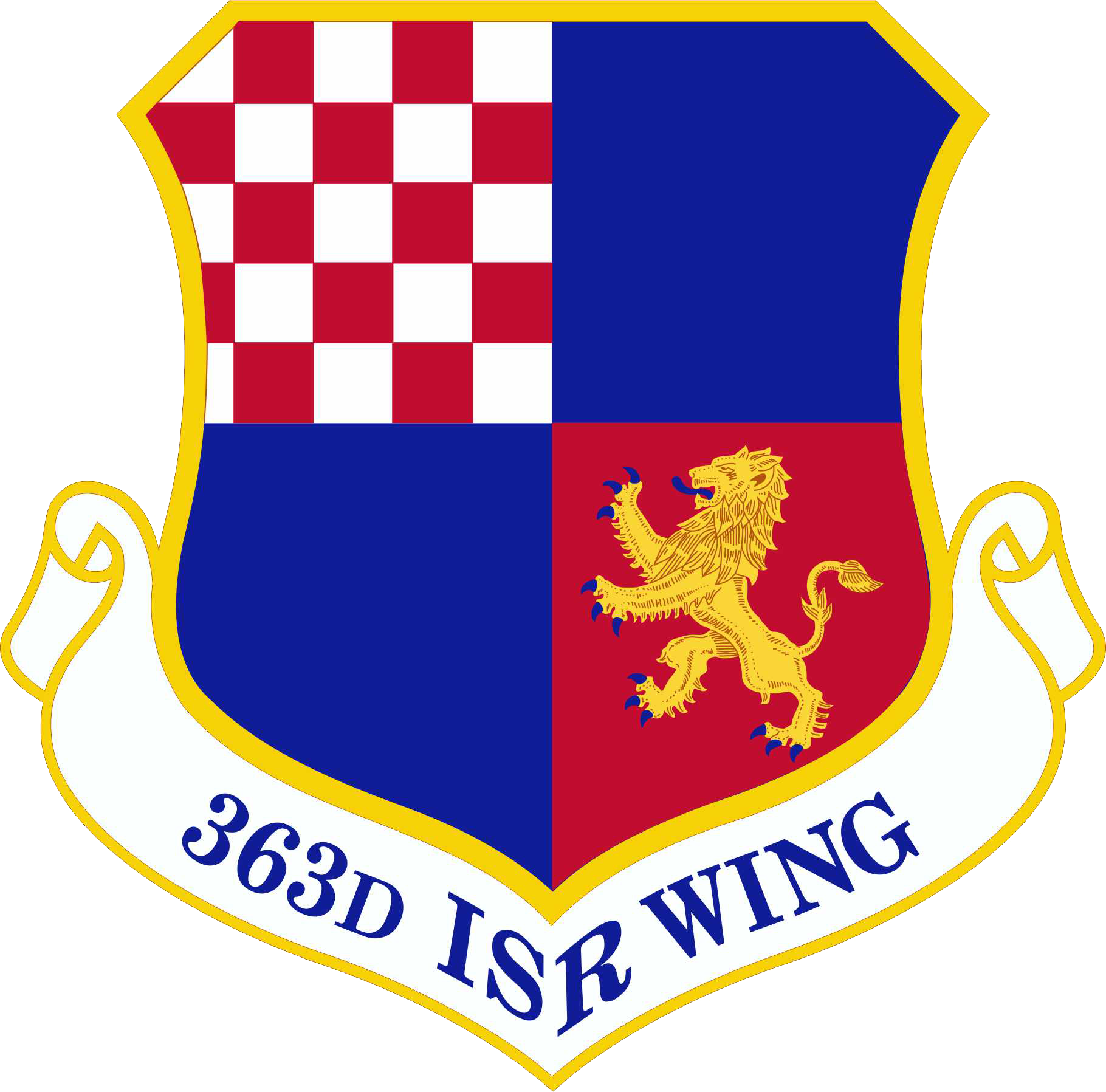
- 363d ISR Wing emblem (Note: Approved 16 June 1952. Scroll modified 19 May 2010.)

The 363rd Intelligence, Surveillance and Reconnaissance Wing is a United States Air Force unit. The wing is assigned to the United States Air Force Sixteenth Air Force, stationed at Joint Base Langley-Eustis, Virginia.

The wing conducts lethal, resilient, and ready operations in four core mission areas: analysis for air, space, and cyber operations; full-spectrum targeting; special operations ISR (Intelligence, Surveillance, and Reconnaissance) and ISR testing, tactics development, and advanced training.

In a ceremony on 11 July 2011, the group was inactivated and replaced by the AFCEN (United States Air Forces Central Command) Air Warfare Center. On 13 February 2015, the 363d Flying Training Group was redesignated as the 363d Intelligence, Surveillance and Reconnaissance Wing. The wing activated on 17 February 2015.

== Mission ==
The 363rd Intelligence, Surveillance, and Reconnaissance (ISR) Wing is based at Joint Base Langley–Eustis, Virginia. It is subordinate to the Sixteenth Air Force (Air Forces Cyber). The wing conducts operations in four core mission areas: analysis for air, space, and cyber operations; full-spectrum targeting; special operations ISR; and ISR testing, tactics development, and advanced training.

The wing comprises three groups and two detachments with a footprint spanning fifteen states, the United Kingdom and Japan. The 363rd ISRW produces tailored geospatial and comprehensive threat analysis products to Air Force units employing air power. The wing's mission is to deliver integrated content-dominant analytical expertise, precision targeting, production, and special operations ISR support to the operational and tactical warfighter enabling combat power in air, space, and cyberspace.

== Component units ==
Unless otherwise indicated, units are based at Joint Base Langley-Eustis, Virginia, and subordinate units are located at the same location as their commanding group.

361st Intelligence, Surveillance and Reconnaissance Group (Hurlburt Field, Florida)

- 25th Intelligence Squadron (Hurlburt Field, Florida)
- 43rd Intelligence Squadron (Cannon Air Force Base, New Mexico)
- 306th Intelligence Squadron (Will Rogers Air National Guard Base, Oklahoma)
- Operating Location A
- Operating Location B (Fort Bragg, North Carolina)
- Operating Location D (Will Rogers ANGB, Oklahoma)
- Operating Location E (Greenville, Texas)
- Operating Location F (Denver, Colorado)

363rd Intelligence, Surveillance, and Reconnaissance Group

- 15th Intelligence Squadron (Inactivated 3 February 2021)
- 17th Intelligence Squadron
- 20th Intelligence Squadron (Offutt Air Force Base, Nebraska)
- 36th Intelligence Squadron
- 363rd Intelligence Support Squadron

365th Intelligence, Surveillance and Reconnaissance Group (Nellis Air Force Base, Nevada)

- 51st Intelligence Squadron (Shaw Air Force Base, South Carolina)
- 57th Intelligence Squadron (Joint Base San Antonio-Lackland, Texas)
- 526th Intelligence Squadron
- 547th Intelligence Squadron

== History ==
=== 363rd Reconnaissance Wing ===
The 363rd Reconnaissance Wing was activated on 15 August 1947 when the Army Air Forces introduced the experimental wing base organization which established a single wing on each base. It was stationed at Langley Field, Virginia in December 1947 by the newly established USAF. It was redesignated the 363rd Tactical Reconnaissance Wing on 27 August 1948. President Truman's reduced 1949 defense budget required reductions in the number of groups in the Air Force to 48 and the unit was inactivated on 26 April 1949. Once North Korea invaded South Korea, this constraint was removed and the group was again activated on 1 September 1950 at Langley.

Due to the pressing needs of Far East Air Forces in Japan the 162nd TRS, flying RB-26s, and the photo-processing 363rd Reconnaissance Technical Squadron (RTS) were reassigned from Langley to Itazuke Air Base Japan for Korean War service and began operations in August 1950 as part of the 543rd Tactical Support Group.

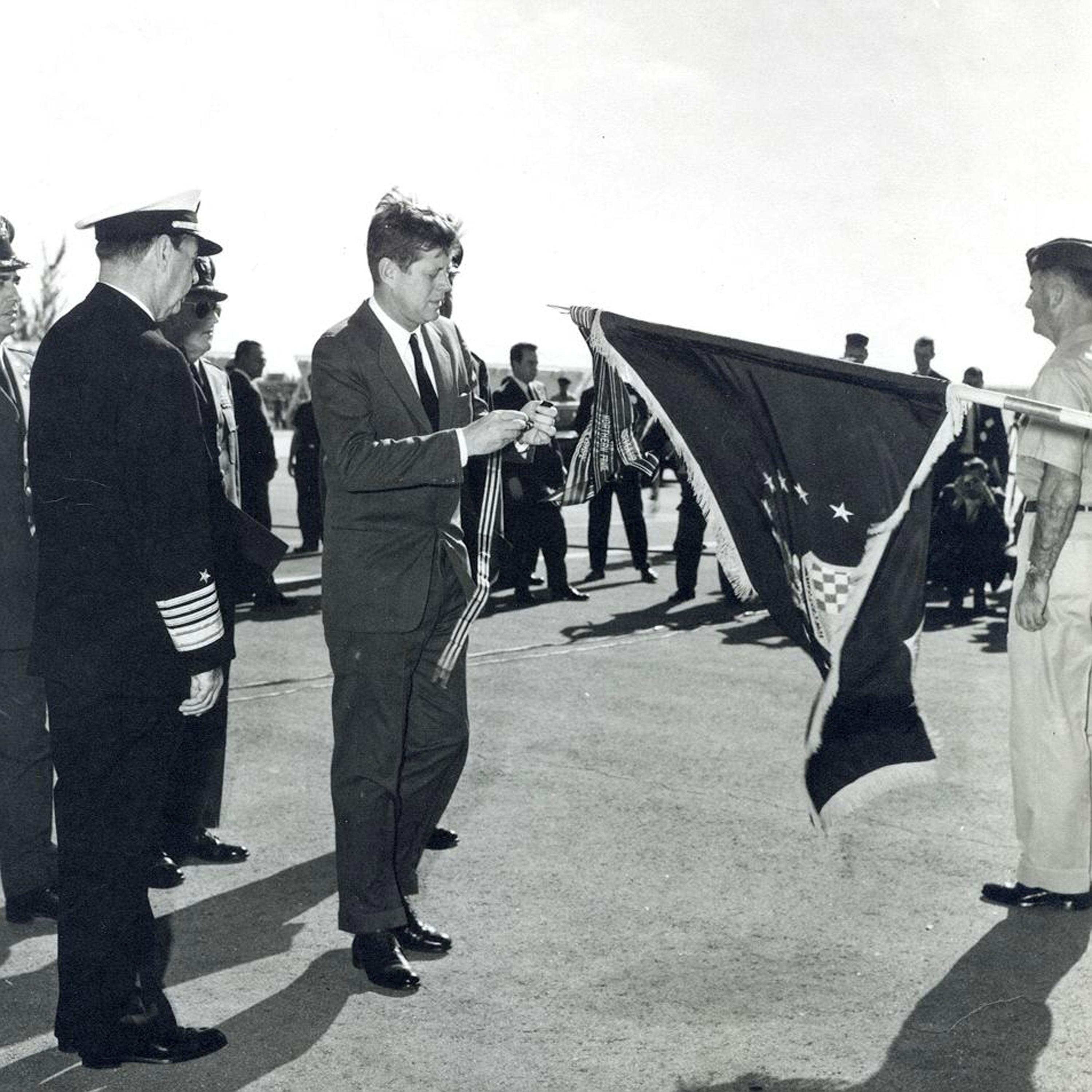
President Kennedy presents the Air and Space Outstanding Unit Award to the 363 TRW in 1962 in recognition of the unit's actions associated with the Cuban Missile Crisis.

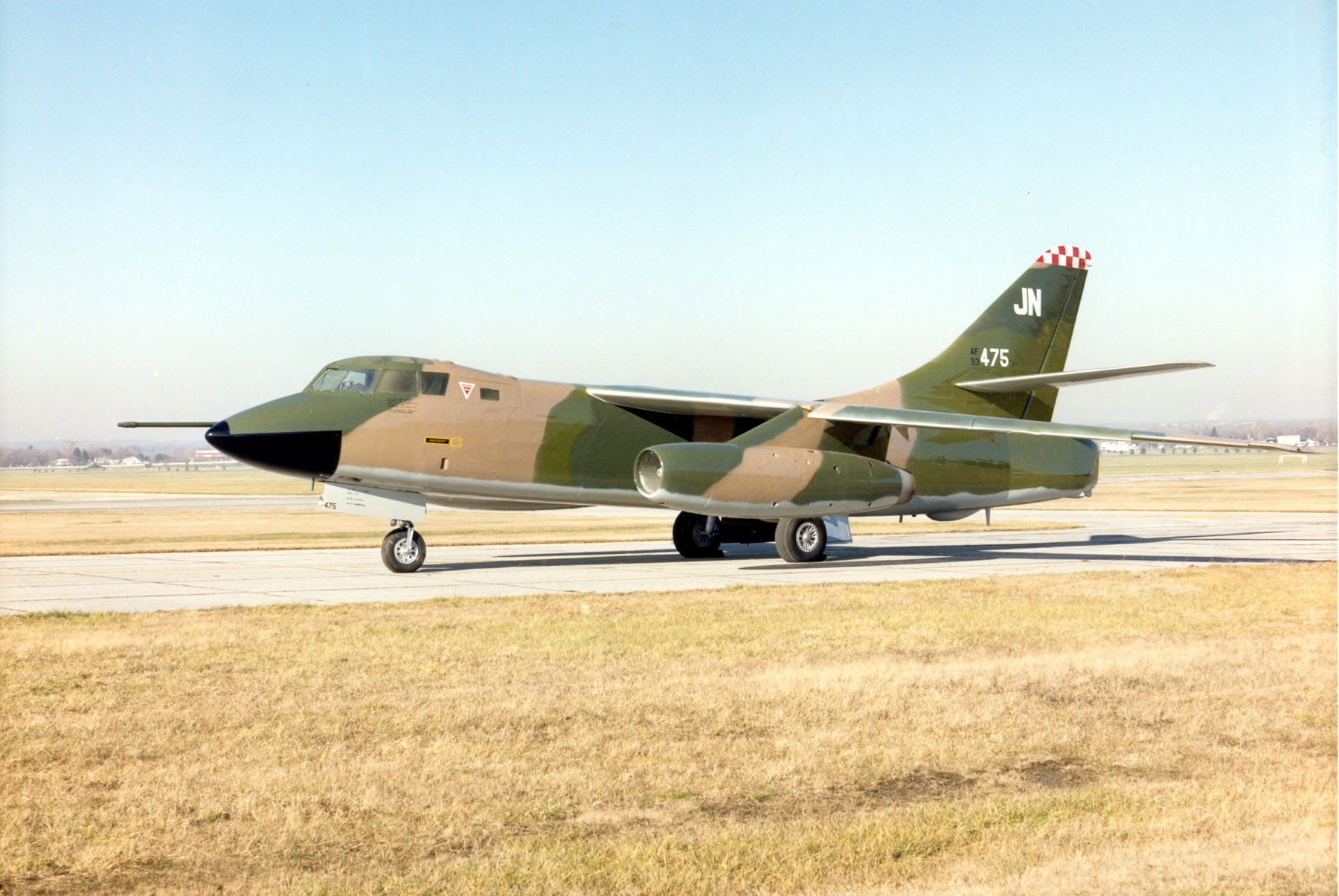
Douglas RB-66B 53-475 of the 39th Tactical Electronics Warfare Training Squadron (Note: This plane is now at the National Museum of the United States Air Force.)

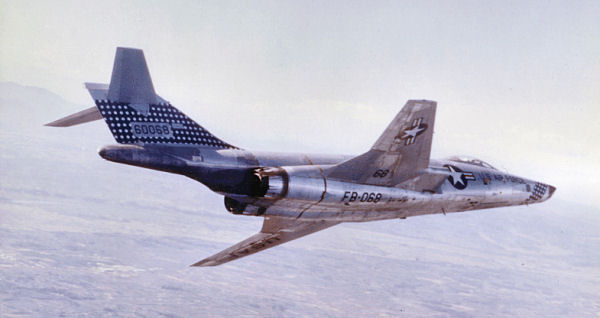
McDonnell RF-101C-65-MC Voodoo Serial No. 56-0068 of the 363rd Tactical Reconnaissance Wing. (Note: This aircraft is currently on static display at the Keesler Air Force Base, Mississippi Air Park.)

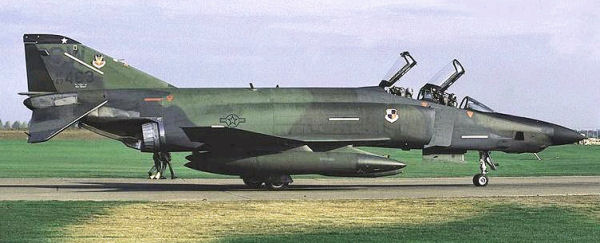
McDonnell RF-4C-34-MC Phantom II Serial No. 67-0436 of the 16th Tactical Reconnaissance Squadron in October 1986. (Note: Note the NATO European camouflage scheme, "SW" tail code and low visibility USAF markings. This was one of the last RF-4Cs flown by the 363rd TFW before their retirement in 1989.)

On 1 April 1951, the 363rd TRW was transferred to Shaw Air Force Base, South Carolina. The 363rd Tactical Reconnaissance Wing would remain at Shaw, under various designations, for the next 43 years. The wing's mission was to fly photographic, electronic and electronic intelligence missions to support air and ground operations by American or Allied ground forces through its operational component, the 363rd Tactical Reconnaissance Group. In addition, the 363rd provided combat crew training for reconnaissance aircrews.

In July 1954, the wing began to receive Martin RB-57A Canberra aircraft and achieved initial operational capability before the month was over. These were the first operational RB-57As in the Air Force, although the 345th Bombardment Wing had received a handful earlier to conduct transition training for its crews.

In January 1956, the wing's 9th Tactical Reconnaissance Squadron was the first in the Air Force to receive jet powered Douglas RB-66B Destroyers. The RB-66B was the first operational model of the B-66. Although initially, the RB-66B had a limited all weather capability, its arrival permitted the retirement of the obsolescent RB-26s and the early retirement of the problem-ridden RB-57As. Deliveries of the RB-66Bs permitted the activation of two additional squadrons in the wing's 363rd Tactical Reconnaissance Group, the 41st and 43rd Tactical Reconnaissance Squadrons.

In 1958, the 363rd Tactical Reconnaissance Group was inactivated, and its components were assigned directly to the Wing.

In September 1957, the RF-101C began deliveries to Shaw. The C model combined the strengthened structure of the F-101C with the camera installation of the RF-101A. In addition, the RF-101C differed from the RF-101A in being able to accommodate a centerline nuclear weapon, so that it could carry out a secondary nuclear strike mission if ever called upon to do so. The RF-101Cs served for a brief time alongside the RF-101A, but quickly replaced them by May 1958.

In the autumn of 1962, the pilots of the 363rd played a major part in the Cuban Missile Crisis. Utilizing their RF-101s for low-altitude photo-reconnaissance missions, they helped identify and track activities at Cuban missile sites, airfields, and port facilities. In awarding the wing the Air Force Outstanding Unit Award for its achievements, President John F. Kennedy said, "You gentlemen have contributed as much to the security of the United States as any group of men in our history."

The last USAF RF-101C was phased out of the 31st TRTS, a replacement training unit at Shaw AFB, on 16 February 1971 and turned over to the Air National Guard.

In 1956, the RB-66 Destroyer was assigned to the 363rd TRW. They replaced the obsolescent RB-26 Invader. The USAF RB-66 force in the continental United States was concentrated at Shaw, with the first RB-66C arriving on 1 February 1956, and the aircraft would continue to operate from Shaw until its retirement in 1974.

Twelve RB-66Cs initially flew with the 9th Tactical Reconnaissance Squadron (TRS), and then later with various training squadrons including the 4417th Combat Crew Training Squadron (CCTS), 4411th CCTS, and 39th Tactical Electronic Warfare Training Squadron (TEWTS), as well as the 4416th Test Squadron (TS).

In addition to their training function, Shaw personnel participated in all major exercises and tested and evaluated the RB/EB-B66 and equipment. The wing was also to augment, within 72 hours, either of the overseas tactical air forces (PACAF and USAFE) in case of crisis or war. Most early flying of the RB-66C was devoted to getting the aircraft and crew ready for deployment and operations. It took longer than expected to have the electronic gear on the RB-66C operational, as the equipment was continually being modified. Readiness rates for the RB-66C in the late fifties and early sixties were below average, especially when compared to other new aircraft, such as the RF-101, introduced into the wing at Shaw during that same time. The RB-66 eventually became the primary night photographic reconnaissance weapon system of the Tactical Air Command. 363rd TRW RB-66Cs carried out missions over Cuba during the Cuban Missile Crisis of 1962.

They were first deployed for combat operations in Southeast Asia during April 1965 and shortly thereafter all were transferred to duty in Southeast Asia, where they carried most of the early electronic warfare operations during the early years of the US involvement in the war. Many B-66s were deployed on 90-day rotations to Takhli Royal Thai Air Force Base and Korat Royal Thai Air Force Base during the Vietnam War. In Southeast Asia, these aircraft retained the Shaw tail code "JN". During the period 1 April 1969 through 1 January 1973 there was a 39th TEWS flying EB-66's at Spangdahlem Air Base West Germany which was a separate unit unrelated to the 39th TEWTS.

The McDonnell RF-4C Phantom II was the unarmed photographic reconnaissance version of the USAF's F-4C. The first production RF-4Cs went in September 1964 to the 363rd TRW's 33rd Tactical Reconnaissance Training Squadron. The first operational unit to receive the RF-4C was the 16th Tactical Reconnaissance Squadron of the 363rd TRW, achieving initial combat-readiness in August 1965.

The RF-4C became the main USAF tactical reconnaissance aircraft for the next 25 years, before being phased out of active service in the early 1990s at the end of the Cold War.

On 15 July 1971, two EB-57Es were transferred along with the RF-4Cs of the 22nd TRS from Bergstrom Air Force Base, Texas, then transferred to the 16th TRS when the 22nd TRS was inactivated. These aircraft were highly adapted to carry electronic countermeasures and were frequently deployed to Europe to support USAFE fighter activities. The 363rd operated these aircraft until September 1974 then transferring them to the Air National Guard. They were the last B-57s operated by the active-duty USAF.

=== 363rd Tactical Fighter Wing ===
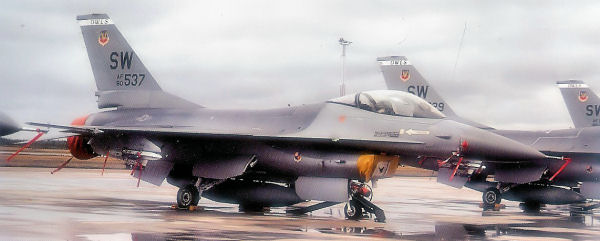
17th Tactical Fighter Squadron General Dynamics F-16A Block 10D Fighting Falcon Serial No 80-0537. (Note: This aircraft was previously a static display at Lockheed-Martin Fort Worth, TX. On 19 March 2004 it was noted to be in use as a ground instructional airframe at NAS Fort Worth JRB, Texas.)

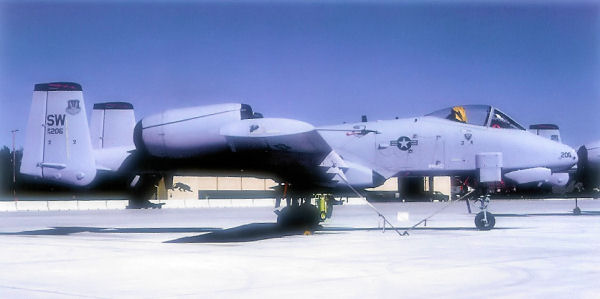
Fairchild Republic A-10A Thunderbolt II AF Serial No. 79-0206 of the 21st Fighter Squadron, 29 September 1993.

The aging and phaseout of the RF-4C aircraft fleet and the utility of the Lockheed TR-1 in Europe for tactical reconnaissance led to the decision by the USAF to realign the mission of the 363rd TRW. The reconnaissance training mission of the wing was terminated in 1981 and beginning in 1982, the wing would become 363rd Tactical Fighter Wing', being equipped with General Dynamics F-16 aircraft. On 1 October 1981, the 363rd TRW was re-designated .

The 363rd TFW received its first General dynamics F-16 Fighting Falcon on 26 March 1982. The 363rd TFW flew F-16A/B Block 10 aircraft until 1984 then converted to Block 15s; F-16C/D Block 25s in autumn 1985 and Block 42s in late 1991. All aircraft carried the "SW" Tail Code.

On 9 August 1990, the 17th and 33rd TFS of 363rd TFW became the first F-16 squadrons to deploy to the United Arab Emirates in Operation Desert Shield. Operating from Al Dhafra Air Base as the 363rd Tactical Fighter Wing, Provisional (along with the 10th TFS from the 50th TFW, Hahn Air Base, Germany), the wing flew combat missions to Iraq and Kuwait during Operation Desert Storm between 17 January and 28 February 1991.

Following Desert Storm, the 19th and 33rd Tactical Fighter Squadrons deployed to the Persian Gulf in support of Operation Southern Watch, a coalition effort to enforce the Iraqi "No Fly Zone" south of the 32nd parallel north. The 33rd TFS made history when one of its pilots downed an Iraqi aircraft with an AIM-120 missile. The incident marked the first time an AIM-120 missile was fired in combat and was the first U.S. F-16 air-to-air kill.

With the closure of Myrtle Beach Air Force Base South Carolina and the inactivation of the 354th Fighter Wing, the 21st Tactical Fighter Squadron was activated at Shaw and received 30 Republic A/OA-10 Thunderbolt IIs from the inactivating 355th Fighter Squadron on 1 April 1992. All A-10 aircraft with the 21st TFS were designated as OA-10A.

As a result of the August 1992 destruction of Homestead Air Force Base Florida by Hurricane Andrew in September 1992, the 31st Fighter Wing's 309th Fighter Squadron was initially evacuated to Shaw AFB prior to the hurricane making landfall. With Homstead unusable for an extended period after the hurricane, on 1 October 1992 the squadron was permanently assigned to the 363rd Fighter Wing.

As a result of the end of the Cold War, the Air Force made several dramatic changes with the inactivation and re-designation of wings and their units. The 363rd FW and all of its squadrons were inactivated on 31 December 1993, being replaced at Shaw by the 20th Fighter Wing being moved to Shaw from RAF Upper Heyford, England.

=== 363rd Air Expeditionary Wing ===
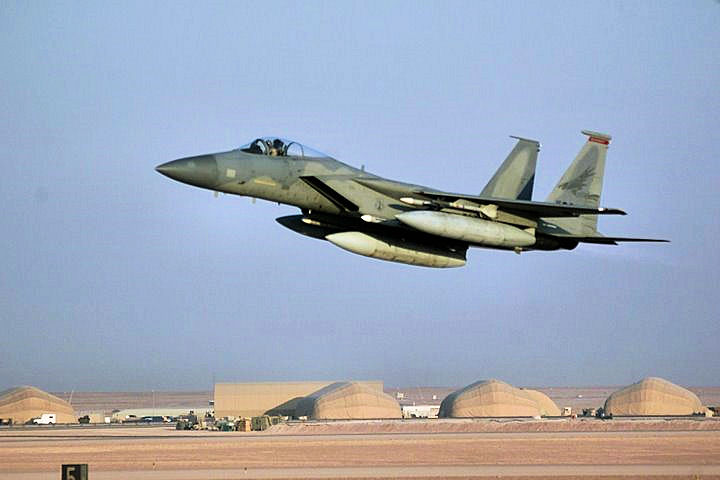
A 363rd Air Expeditionary Wing F-15 Eagle takes off at Prince Sultan Air Base, Saudi Arabia, during Operation Southern Watch

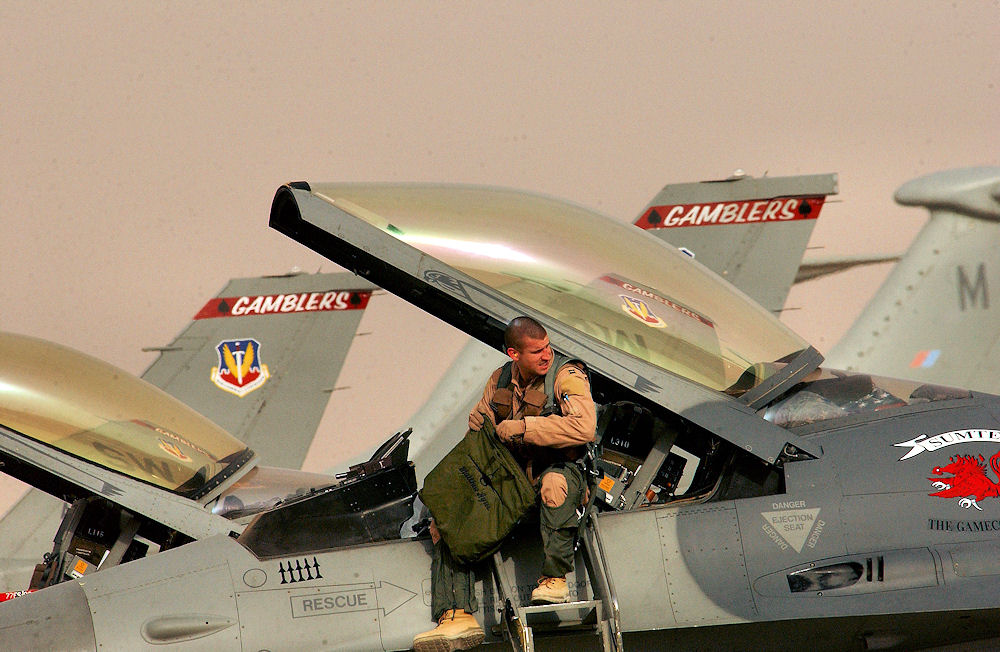
An F-16 Fighting Falcon pilot assigned to the 363rd Air Expeditionary Wing, prepares for takeoff before a mission from a forward-deployed location in Southwest Asia on 27 March 2003 in support of Operation Iraqi Freedom.

The 363rd Air Expeditionary Wing was activated on 1 December 1998 and replaced the 4404th Wing (Provisional) when the United States Air Force inactivated all MAJCOM wings. The 363 AEW was the primary United States Air Force Air Expeditionary Wing responsible for Operation Southern Watch (OSW), which involved patrolling the Southern No-Fly Zone over Iraq below the 33rd Parallel.

It appears that the 763rd Expeditionary Airlift Squadron served under the wing while operating from Seeb North Air Base, Oman (Muscat International Airport). It flew airlift and medical evacuation missions for Operation Southern Watch. After the September 11 terrorist attacks, "[l]ocated just four hours flying time from Afghanistan, the squadron nearly tripled in size, and Seeb North Air Base became a major cargo hub and home of the first field hospital supporting Operation Enduring Freedom." Vlahos handed over the squadron colours as part of the squadron's inactivation in June 2002.

Following Operation Iraqi Freedom in 2003, US forces began to pull out of Prince Sultan Air Base. On 28 April the Combined Air Operations Center was shifted from PSAB to Al-Udeid in Qatar. On 29 April, US Secretary of Defense Donald Rumsfeld announced that US forces would begin pulling out of Saudi Arabia and that forces in the country would be diverted to other locations. Rear Admiral David Nichols, the deputy commander of the coalition air operations center stated that much of the assets associated with the 363rd AEW would be relocated by the end of the Summer 2003.

The 363rd AEW completed its last operational mission supporting Operation Iraqi Freedom on 28 May 2003 completing a 13-year, continuous mission USAF presence in Saudi Arabia. An E-3 Sentry Airborne Warning and Control System deployed to the 363rd Expeditionary Airborne Air Control Squadron from Tinker Air Force Base, Oklahoma, flew the wing's last operational mission supporting Operation Iraqi Freedom.

U.S. officials transferred control of portions of Prince Sultan Air Base to Saudi officials at a ceremony 26 August 2003. The ceremony also marked the inactivation of the 363rd Air Expeditionary Wing.

=== 363rd Flying Training Group ===
Assuming the mission formerly performed by the Gulf Air Warfare Center, the 363rd Flying Training Group built partnerships, tactical capabilities, and improved interoperability to facilitate integrated air operations and missile defense. - Official website

On 12 March 2007, Air Combat Command designated and organized the 363rd Flying Training Group (Provisional) at Al Dhafra Air Base in the United Arab Emirates to facilitate the training of airmen from various nations. On 1 June, this organization was made permanent when the 363rd wing was redesignated the 363rd Flying Training Group and activated, assuming the mission, personnel and equipment of the provisional group.

On 21 July 2011, the 363rd Flying Training Group was inactivated. Lt. Gen. Mike Hostage, the commander of U.S. Air Force Central Command, presided over a ceremony in which the AFCENT Air Warfare Center was activated and the 363rd Flying Training Group was inactivated.

=== Return to reconnaissance mission ===
On 18 January 2015, the unit was activated again at Joint Base Langley-Eustis as the 363rd Intelligence, Surveillance and Reconnaissance Wing uniting several units into a single wing dedicated to providing targeting information for a variety of strike platforms.

== Lineage ==
- Designated as the 363rd Reconnaissance Wing on 29 July 1947

Organized on 15 August 1947
Discontinued on 27 August 1948

- Constituted as the 363rd Tactical Reconnaissance Wing
- Activated on 27 August 1948

Inactivated on 26 April 1949

- Activated on 1 September 1950

Redesignated 363rd Tactical Fighter Wing on 1 October 1981
Redesignated 363rd Fighter Wing on 1 June 1992
Inactivated on 31 December 1993

- Redesignated 363rd Air Expeditionary Wing, Converted to provisional status and allotted to Air Combat Command to activate or inactivate any time on 1 October 1998

Activated on 1 December 1998
Inactivated on 26 August 2003
Redesignated 363rd Flying Training Group and withdrawn from provisional status on 25 March 2007
Activated on 1 June 2007
Inactivated on 11 July 2011
Redesignated 363rd Intelligence, Surveillance and Reconnaissance Wing on 13 February 2015
Activated on 17 February 2015

=== Assignments ===
- Ninth Air Force, 15 August 1947 – 27 August 1948
- Ninth Air Force, 27 August 1948 – 26 April 1949

Attached to First Air Force, 15 January-1 February 1949

- Tactical Air Command, 1 September 1950
- Ninth Air Force, 2 April 1951
- Tactical Air Division Provisional, 25 April 1951
- Ninth Air Force, 11 October 1951

Attached to Twenty-Ninth Air Force [Tactical] [Provisional], 31 October-10 December 1955

- 837th Air Division, 8 February 1958
- USAF Tactical Air Reconnaissance Center, 1 February 1963
- Ninth Air Force, 15 July 1963
- 833rd Air Division, 1 October 1964
- Ninth Air Force, 24 December 1969 – 30 December 1993
- United States Central Command Air Forces, 1 December 1998 – 26 August 2003
- Ninth Air Force, 26 March 2007 – 11 July 2011
- Twenty-Fifth Air Force, 17 February 2015
- Sixteenth Air Force, 11 October 2019 – present

=== Components ===
Groups

- 361st Intelligence, Surveillance, and Reconnaissance Group: 17 February 2015 – present
- 363rd Reconnaissance (later 363rd Tactical Reconnaissance Group, 363rd Operations Group, 363rd Expeditionary Operations, 363rd Intelligence, Surveillance, Reconnaissance Group): 15 August 1947 – 27 August 1948; 27 August 1948 – 26 April 1949; 1 September 1950 – 8 February 1958 (detached 25 April-10 October 1951); 1 May 1992 – 30 December 1993; 1 December 1998 – 26 August 2003; 17 February 2015 – present
- 363rd Expeditionary Logistics Group, 1 October 1998 – 26 August 2003
- 363rd Expeditionary Support Group, 1 October 1998 – 26 August 2003
- 365th Intelligence, Surveillance, and Reconnaissance Group: 17 February 2015 – present
- 432d Tactical Reconnaissance Group: attached 18 March 1954 – 30 October 1955; 10 December 1955 – 8 February 1958
- 4402nd Tactical Training Group: 1 July 1966 – 20 January 1968
- 4403rd Tactical Training Group: 1 July 1966 – 20 January 1968 (Never manned or equipped)

Squadrons

- 9th Tactical Reconnaissance Squadron: 8 February 1958 – 1 July 1966; 1 February 1967 – 1 September 1969 (not operational)
- 10th Fighter-Interceptor Squadron: attached 11 September-1 December 1950
- 16th Tactical Reconnaissance Squadron: 8 February 1958 – 27 October 1965; 15 February 1971 – 15 December 1989
- 17th Tactical Fighter Squadron (later 17th Fighter Squadron): 1 July 1982 – 31 December 1993
- 18th Reconnaissance Squadron: 30 January 1970 – 30 December 1979, (detached 12–29 April 1977)
- 19th Tactical Reconnaissance Squadron: attached 20 July 1953 – 7 May 1954; assigned 1 September 1966 – 1 February 1967; assigned 20 January-31 December 1968
- 19th Tactical Fighter Squadron (later 19th Fighter Squadron): 1 April 1982 – 31 December 1993
- 20th Tactical Reconnaissance Squadron: attached 8 April-17 May 1959, assigned 18 May 1959 – 12 November 1965
- 21st Tactical Fighter Squadron: 1 November 1991 – 1 April 1992; 1 April 1992 – 30 December 1993
- 22nd Tactical Reconnaissance Squadron: 15 July-15 October 1971
- 29th Reconnaissance (later Tactical Reconnaissance) Squadron: attached 8 April-17 May 1959, assigned 18 May 1959 – 1 July 1966; assigned 20 January 1968 – 24 January 1971
- 31st Tactical Reconnaissance Training Squadron: 15 October 1969 – 18 February 1971
- 33rd Tactical Reconnaissance Training (later Tactical Fighter, later Fighter) Squadron: 15 October 1969 – 1 October 1982; 8 March 1985 – 15 November 1993
- 39th Tactical Reconnaissance Training (later, 39th Tactical Electronic Warfare Training) Squadron: 15 October 1969 – 15 March 1974
- 41st Tactical Reconnaissance Squadron: 8 February 1958 – 18 May 1959; 1 October-20 November 1965
- 43rd Tactical Reconnaissance Squadron: 8 February 1958 – 18 May 1959 (detached c. 1 February-7 April 1959)
- 62nd Tactical Reconnaissance Squadron: 15 October 1971 – 30 June 1982
- 77th Fighter Squadron deployed from 20th Operations Group February to May 2003
- 84th Bombardment Squadron: (Attached), 1 September 1950 – 12 March 1951
- 165th Tactical Reconnaissance Squadron: attached 25 March-3 May 1968
- 309th Fighter Squadron: 1 October 1992 – 31 December 1993

Was temporarily deployed to Shaw from 31st Tactical Fighter Wing, Homestead AFB on 22 August 1992 due to Hurricane Andrew

- 526th Intelligence Squadron: 18 January 2015 – present
- 547th Intelligence Squadron: 18 January 2015 – present
- 2215th (later, 4400th) Combat Crew Training Squadron: attached 1 September 1950 – 12 March 1951
- 4414th Combat Crew Training Squadron: 20 January 1968 – 15 October 1969 (RF-101A/C Training Squadron)
- 4415th Combat Crew Training Squadron: 1 February 1967 – 15 October 1969 (RF-4C Training Squadron
- 4416th Test Squadron: 1 July 1963 – 1 May 1970 (EB-66 R&D squadron)
- 4417th Combat Crew Training Squadron: 1 July 1966 – 1 February 1967; 20 January 1968 – 15 October 1969 (RB/EB-66 training squadron)

=== Stations ===
- Langley Field (later Langley Air Force Base), Virginia, 15 August 1947 – 27 August 1948
- Langley Air Force Base, Virginia, 27 August 1948 – 26 April 1949
- Langley Air Force Base, Virginia, 1 September 1950 – 12 March 1951
- Shaw Air Force Base, South Carolina, 2 April 1951 – 31 December 1993
- Prince Sultan Air Base, Saudi Arabia, 1 December 1998 – 26 August 2003
- Al Dhafra Air Base, United Arab Emirates, 1 June 2007 – 11 July 2011
- Joint Base Langley-Eustis, 17 February 2015 – present

=== Aircraft ===
- FP (later, RF)-80 and FA (later, RB)-26, 1947–1948
- Primarily RF-80 and RB-26, 1948–1949; but also included F-6, 1948
- H-5, 1949; and L-5, 1949
- Primarily B-26, 1950–1951, 1951–1952
- B-45, 1950–1951
- RB-26, 1951, 1951–1957
- RF-80, 1951, 1951–1955
- B-25, 1952–1954
- RB-45, 1954
- RB-57, 1954–1956
- RF-84, 1954–1958
- RT-33, 1955–1956
- WT-33, 1955–1956
- RB-66, 1956–1969
- WB-66, 1957–1964, 1968–1969
- RF-101, 1957–1958, 1959–1971
- RF-4, 1965–1989
- EB-66, 1966–1974
- RB-26, 1950–1951
- F-84, 1951
- L-13, 1951–1954
- L-20, 1951–1954
- T-33, 1951–1955
- TB-25, 1956–1958
- TF-101, 1966–1969
- B-57, 1971–1976
- F-16, 1982–1993, 1998–2003
- A-10, 1991–1993
- U-2, 1998–2003
- F-15, 1998–2003
- EA-6B, 1998–2003 (USN & USMC assets)
- Panavia Tornado, 1998–2003
- C-21, 1998–2003
