= 21st Fighter Squadron =

US Air Force unit

21st Fighter Squadron

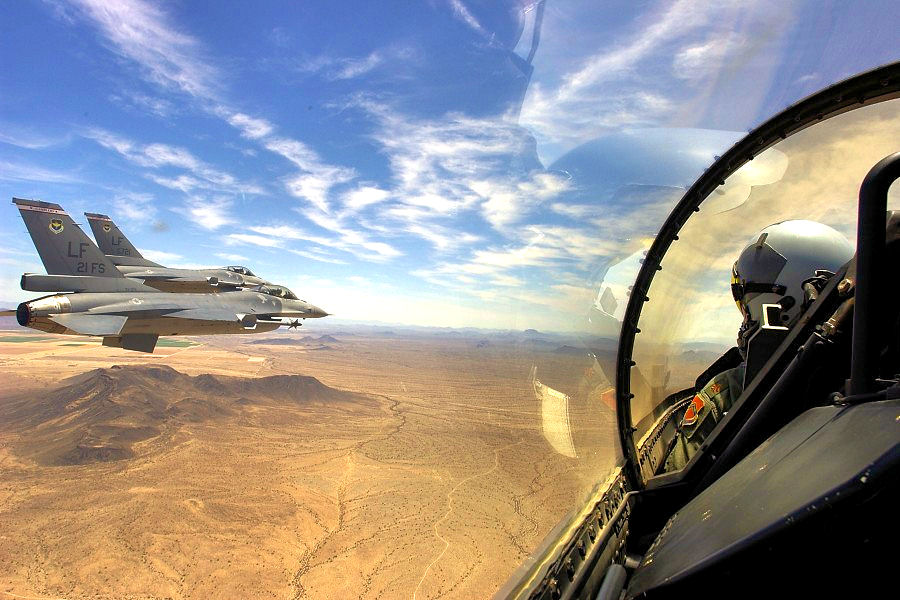
- 21st Squadron F-16 Fighting Falcons in formation (Note: These aircraft have both ROCAF (6610 and 6620) and USAF (93-711) and 6620 (93-721) serial numbers. They fly in USAF markings.)
- Active: 1944–1946; 1954–1959; 1972–1991; 1991–1993; 1996–present
- Country: United States
- Branch: United States Air Force
- Role: Fighter Training
- Part of: Air Combat Command
- Garrison/HQ: Morris Air National Guard Base
- Nickname: Black Panthers (before 1959) Gamblers (after 1972)
- Colors: Red & Black
- Engagements: Pacific Ocean Theater
- Decorations: Air Force Outstanding Unit Award

Commanders
- Current commander: Lt Col Javier "Ponch" Antuña

Insignia
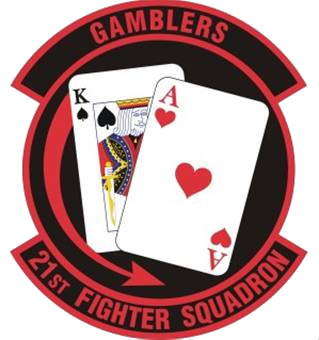
- 21st Fighter Squadron emblem (approved 18 March 2008)

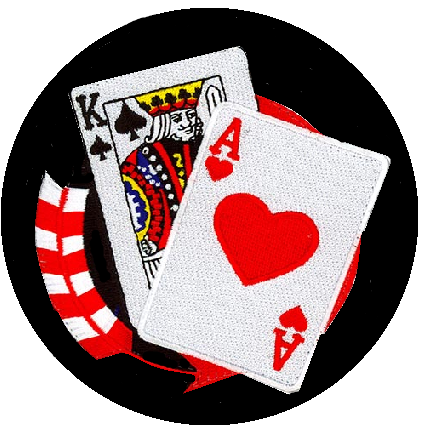
- 21st Tactical Fighter Training Squadron emblem

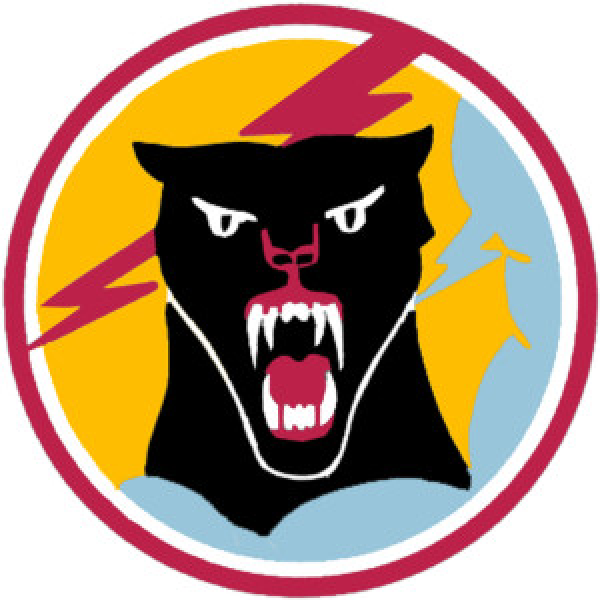
- 21st Fighter Squadron emblem (approved 5 January 1946)

The 21st Fighter Squadron is part of the 56th Operations Group at Luke Air Force Base, Arizona, however it is separately based at Morris Air National Guard Base. It is a United States Air Force squadron that operates Taiwan-owned General Dynamics F-16V Fighting Falcon aircraft conducting fighter and maintenance training for the pilots and maintainers of the Republic of China Air Force.

Prior to reforming at Luke in 1997, the 21st Tactical Fighter Training Squadron operated McDonnell F-4E Phantom IIs at George Air Force Base, California until 1993.

== Mission ==
The 21st Fighter Squadron, 'The Gamblers', operate both the Block 20 F-16A/B and the F-16V for the Republic of China Air Force, under a three-year pilot training program called 'Peace Fenghuang' (Chinese for Phoenix). This was the only squadron at Luke Air Force Base to operate the original F-16 variant, which are unusual in being 93 fiscal year serial new build Block 20 aircraft.

The squadron is to:

- Hone combat skills for ROCAF and USAF pilots to peak readiness.
- Build lasting friendships for ROC and US National Security interests.
- Preserve ROCAF and USAF resources for combat taskings.
- Enhance quality of life and promote personal and professional growth.

== History ==
=== World War II ===
The unit was activated in October 1944 as a very long range Republic P-47N Thunderbolt fighter-escort squadron for B-29 Superfortress units engaged in the strategic bombardment of the Japanese Home Islands. It trained under the Third Air Force in the southeast United States and deployed to the Pacific Ocean Theater, moving to Okinawa in May 1945.

The squadron began operations from Ie Shima Airfield in June. It engaged in dive-bombing and strafing attacks on factories, radar stations, airfields, small ships and other targets in Japan. It made several attacks on shipping and airfields in China during July. The unit flew its only escort mission on 8 August 1945 when it escorted B-29s during a raid against Yawata, Kyoto, Japan.

After the end of combat in the Pacific, it remained on Okinawa as a part of the air defense and occupation force for the Ryukyu Islands after the war. The unit was inactivated on Okinawa on 15 October 1946.

=== Cold War ===
Reactivated in August 1954 under Tactical Air Command and equipped with North American F-86 Sabres at George Air Force Base, California, the unit was re-equipped with the North American F-100 Super Sabre in 1956 and trained in operational proficiency as a Tactical Fighter Squadron, its aircraft carried a blue marking motif. The squadron was inactivated on 15 March 1959 for budgetary reasons, its aircraft were reassigned to the incoming 31st Tactical Fighter Wing being moved from Turner Air Force Base, Georgia.

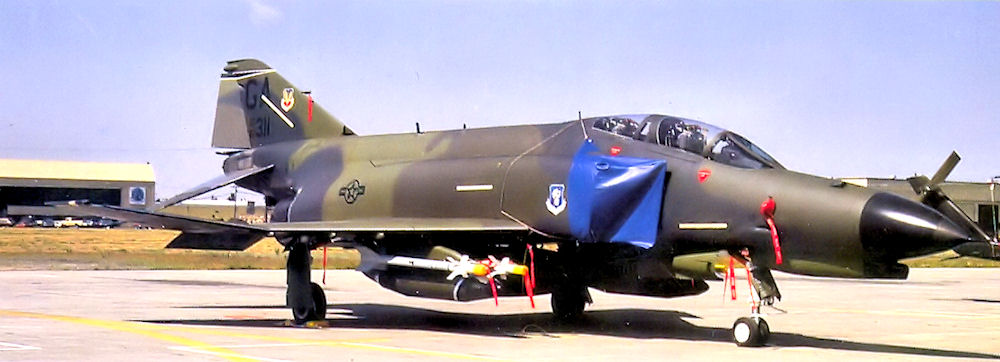
21st Tactical Fighter Training Squadron F-4E at George AFB (Note: Aircraft is McDonnell F-4E serial 67-311. This aircraft was sent to the Aerospace Maintenance and Regeneration Center in 1989.)

The unit was reactivated in 1972 as a wild weasel tactical fighter training radar detection and suppression outfit at George, replacing the 4535th Combat Crew Training Squadron. It trained in Wild Weasel operations with McDonnell F-4C Phantom IIs carrying the tail code "GA", upgrading to the F-4E in 1975 for aircrews who were newly assigned to the aircraft or who were returning to the aircraft from staff positions. The squadron was tasked with training pilots for Pacific Air Forces and continued to do so until 1991. It was inactivated in June 1991 as part of the close of George.

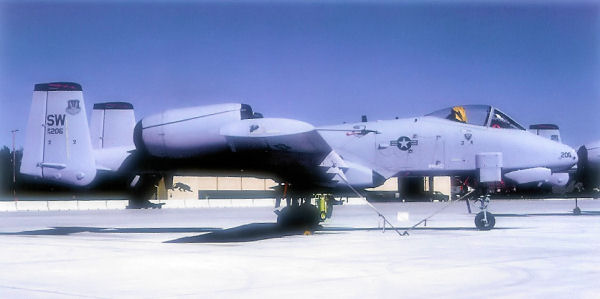
21st Fighter Squadron A-10A Thunderbolt II (Note: Aircraft is Fairchild Republic A-10A Thunderbolt II serial 79-206 at Shaw AFB, SC, 29 September 1993. The aircraft was later modified to OA-10C configuration and transferred to the 75th Fighter Squadron.)

It was reactivated at Shaw Air Force Base, South Carolina in November 1991, where it received Fairchild Republic A-10A Thunderbolt IIs from the inactivating 354th Fighter Wing at Myrtle Beach Air Force Base, South Carolina, the aircraft being redesignated as the OA-10A Thunderbolt forward air control. It was inactivated in December 1993 along with the 363d Fighter Wing when the 20th Fighter Wing moved back to the United States from RAF Upper Heyford, England, assuming the assets of the 363d FW.

=== Training at Luke ===
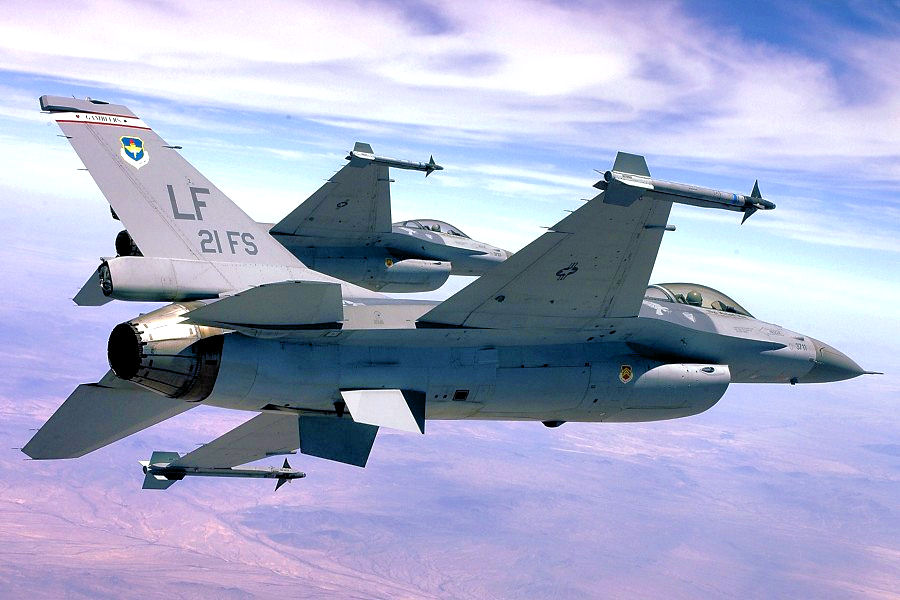
Two 21st Fighter Squadron ROCAF F-16s

The squadron was reactivated in August 1996 to train ROCAF F-16A/B crews. Its outfit was correspond with the 21st Squadron, 455th Wing in Chiayi Air Base, Taiwan, which was the first ROCAF unit equipped with F-16. ROCAF personnel assigned to the 21st was trained at Luke Air Force Base, Arizona. Empty hangars were refurbished and aircrews were pulled-in from other units on base. By January 1997 several F-16A/B block 20s had been delivered and the first training flights began for the Republic of China Air Force crews. The program became known as Peace Fenghuang which is Chinese for 'Phoenix.' Twenty of these aircraft were initially made available, but the numbers have fluctuated over the years, mostly less aircraft for training.

Although flying what could be considered an older version of the F-16, it is more advanced than most other Falcons being flown from Luke. As the first block 20 was only rolled off the production line at Fort Worth, Texas in July 1996, these aircraft had not been tested like other blocks before going to an active training unit. Two aircraft were sent to Edwards Air Force Base, California, for testing while training continued at Luke. Because of this, in the early years the unit liaised with Lockheed frequently.

Training in the 21st Fighter Squadron is a combination of classroom time and flying. For students, the flying involves amassing fifty flights, starting with basic maneuvers to more advanced combat in both aerial engagements and bombing tactics. A program to train instructor pilots is also in place. The first class of pilots graduated in July 1997 and the first instructor pilots graduated in June 1998.

On 18 March 2008, emblem of the squadron was approved. Its concept of design can be traced back to the emblem of ROCAF 21st Squadron in the mid-1950s when the unit was equipped with F-84G. Major Chen Hsing-ling, then commander of the squadron and later Chief of the ROC General Staff, came up with the idea to resemble the unit with the card suit of Twenty-One.

The unit moved to Morris Air National Guard Base during 2022.

== Lineage ==
- Constituted as the 21st Fighter Squadron, Single Engine on 5 October 1944

Activated on 15 October 1944
Inactivated on 15 October 1946

- Redesignated 21st Fighter-Day Squadron on 26 August 1954

Activated on 11 November 1954
Redesignated 21st Tactical Fighter Squadron on 1 July 1958
Inactivated on 15 March 1959

- Redesignated 21st Tactical Fighter Training Squadron on 27 October 1972

Activated on 1 December 1972
Redesignated 21st Tactical Fighter Squadron on 9 October 1980
Redesignated 21st Tactical Fighter Training Squadron on 1 July 1983
Inactivated on 28 June 1991

- Redesignated 21st Fighter Squadron and activated on 1 November 1991

Inactivated on 31 December 1993

- Activated on 8 August 1996

=== Assignments ===
- 413th Fighter Group, 15 October 1944 – 15 October 1946
- 413th Fighter-Day Group, 11 November 1954
- 413th Fighter-Day Wing (later 413th Tactical Fighter Wing), 8 October 1957 – 15 March 1959 (attached to Sixteenth Air Force after 14 March 1959)
- 35th Tactical Fighter Wing (later 35th Tactical Training Wing, 35th Tactical Fighter Wing), 1 December 1972 – 28 June 1991
- 363d Tactical Fighter Wing, 1 November 1991
- 363d Operations Group, 1 May 1992 – 31 December 1993
- 56th Operations Group, 8 August 1996 – present

=== Stations ===
- Seymour Johnson Field, North Carolina, 15 October 1944
- Bluethenthal Field, North Carolina, 9 November 1944 – 7 April 1945
- Ie Shima Airfield, 19 May 1945
- Kadena Airfield, Okinawa, 21 November 1945
- Yontan Airfield, Okinawa, 29 January–15 October 1946
- George Air Force Base, California, 11 November 1954
- Moron Air Base, Spain, 11–15 March 1959
- George Air Force Base, California, 1 December 1972 – 28 June 1991
- Shaw Air Force Base, South Carolina, 1 November 1991 – 31 December 1993
- Luke Air Force Base, Arizona, 8 August 1996 – 2022
- Morris Air National Guard Base, 2022 - present

=== Aircraft ===
- Republic P-47 Thunderbolt (1944–1946)
- North American F-86 Sabre (1954–1956)
- North American F-100 Super Sabre (1956–1959)
- McDonnell Douglas F-4 Phantom II (1972–1991)
- Fairchild Republic OA-10 Thunderbolt II (1991–1993)
- General Dynamics F-16 Fighting Falcon (1996 – present)
