= 4416th Test Squadron =

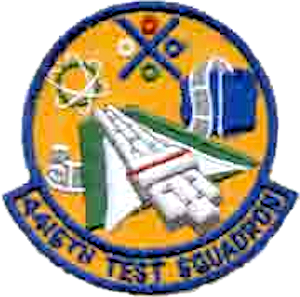
- Emblem of the 4416th Test Squadron
- Active: 1963–1970
- Country: United States
- Branch: United States Air Force
- Role: Electronic Warfare R&D

The 4416th Test Squadron is an inactive provisional Tactical Air Command unit. It was last assigned to the 363d Tactical Reconnaissance Wing, stationed at Shaw Air Force Base, South Carolina. It was inactivated on 1 May 1970.

== History ==
The 4416th Test Squadron undertook development work for electronic warfare components of the EB-66 Destroyer. It was activated to support the growing electronic warfare effort in Southeast Asia. One of the many developments brought to the EB-66 fleet was the carrying of double or triple loads of ALQ-71 ECM pods under wing pylons. Throughout the Vietnam War equipment and tactics were continually updated. Because of experience gained in Southeast Asia the first change to the training syllabus was to add more night-time air refueling which had been found wanting in the theater. Inactivated in 1970 as part of the phaseout of the B-66. The Electronic Warfare mission at Shaw was taken over by the EB-57E Canberra under the 16th TRS.
