= 363rd Intelligence, Surveillance, and Reconnaissance Group =

363rd Intelligence, Surveillance, and Reconnaissance Group

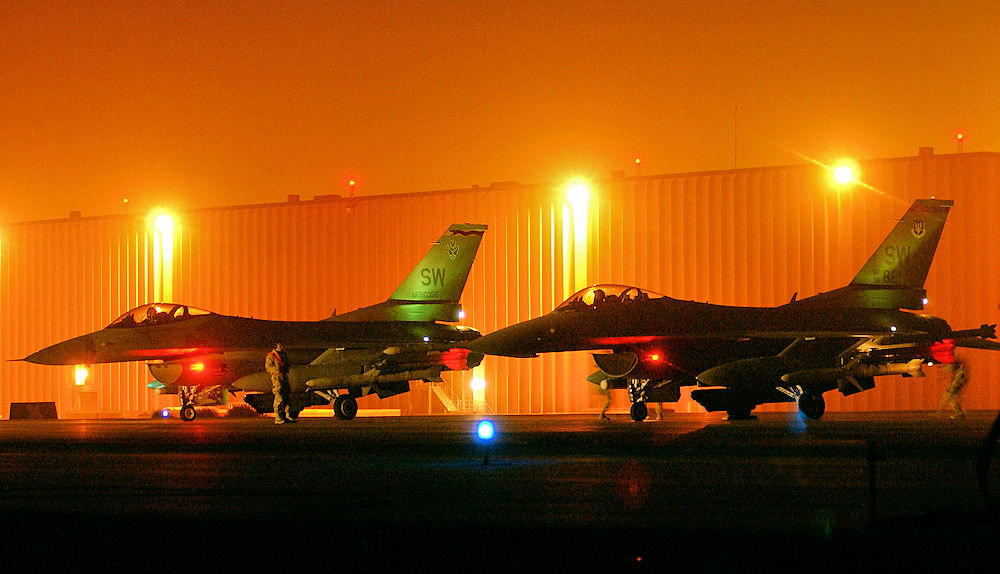
- F-16 Fighting Falcons ready for a night mission during Operation Iraqi Freedom
- Active: 1943–1945; 1946–1958; 1992–1993; 1998–2003; 2015–present
- Country: United States
- Branch: United States Air Force
- Role: Intelligence
- Part of: Air Combat Command
- Garrison/HQ: Joint Base Langley-Eustis, VA
- Motto(s): Voir C'est Savoir French To See is to Know
- Engagements: World War II (EAME Theater): Air Offensive, Europe Campaign; Normandy Campaign; Northern France Campaign; Rhineland Campaign; Ardennes-Alsace Campaign; Central Europe Campaign; Air Combat, EAME Theater; Armed Forces Expeditionary: Operation Northern Watch; Operation Southern Watch; Global War on Terrorism Expeditionary: Operation Enduring Freedom; Operation Iraqi Freedom
- Decorations: Air Force Meritorious Unit Award; Air Force Outstanding Unit Award with Combat "V" Device; Air Force Outstanding Unit Award; Belgian Fourragère

Commanders
- Notable commanders: Col Michael G. Cosby

Insignia
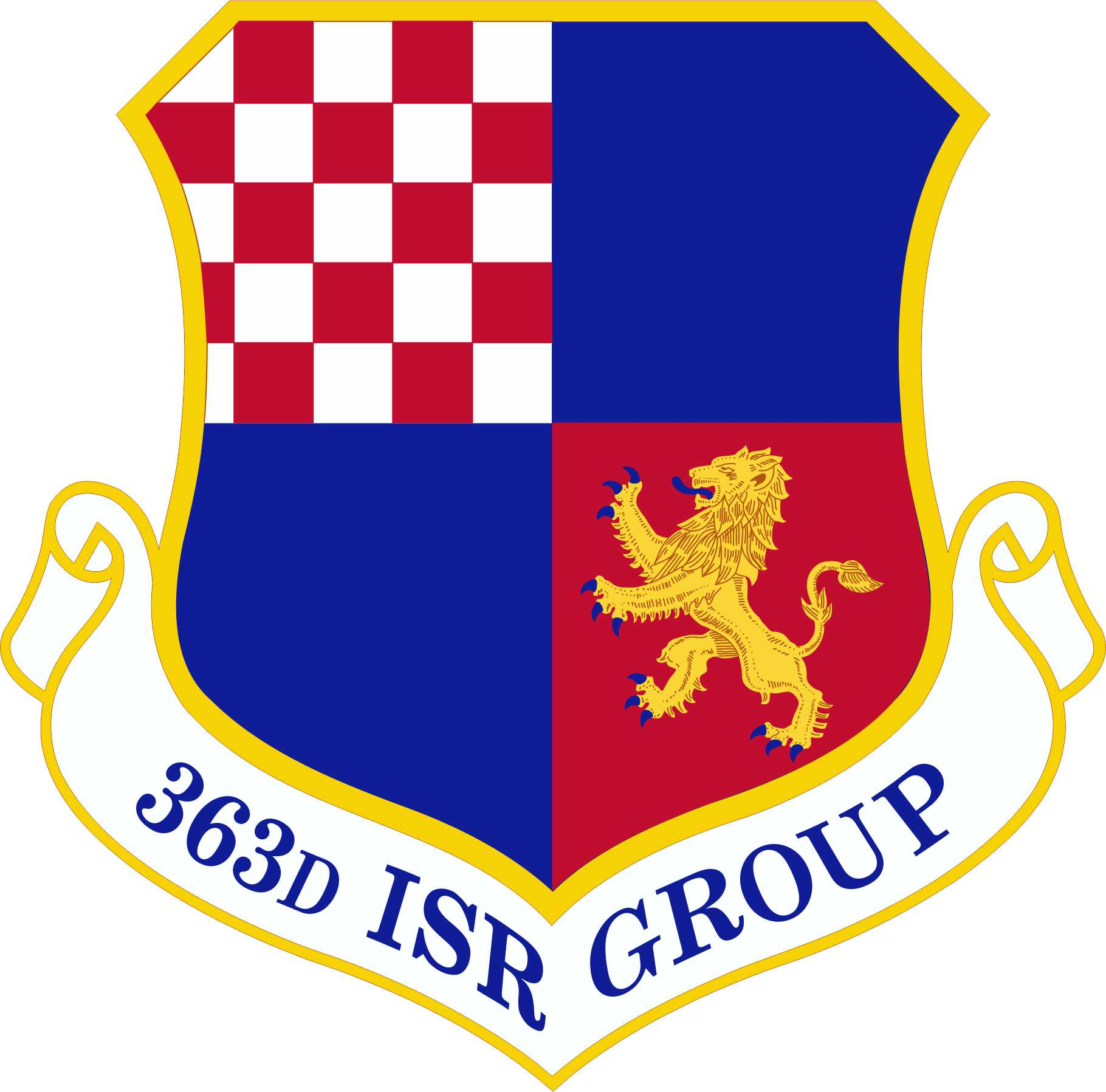
- 363rd Intelligence Surveillance & Reconnaissance Group emblem (Note: The group uses the emblem of the 363rd wing with the group designation on the scroll. Bailey.)

The 363rd Intelligence, Surveillance, and Reconnaissance Group is a United States Air Force unit stationed at Joint Base Langley-Eustis. It is assigned to the 363rd Intelligence, Surveillance and Reconnaissance Wing. It was activated in February 2015, after having been returned to regular service after operating as a provisional unit. The group has its origins in the 363rd Fighter Group, activated on 1 August 1943 at Hamilton Field, California. The unit was credited with 41 victories but lost 43 of its own aircraft during World War II.

The pressing need for tactical aerial photo-reconnaissance during the Normandy Campaign led to the group's conversion to the 363rd Tactical Reconnaissance Group at Le Mans Airfield, France in late 1944. The 363rd returned to the United States after V-E Day and was inactivated.

Reactivated in 1948, the group flew photographic, electronic and electronic intelligence missions to support both air and ground operations by American or Allied ground forces during the early years of the Cold War. It was inactivated in 1958 when its parent wing reorganized under the dual deputy system and its squadrons were reassigned directly to wing headquarters.

The unit was reactivated in 1992 as part of the USAF Objective Wing organization as the 363rd Operations Group, but was inactivated the following year and its assets transferred to another unit. It served as a provisional unit in Southwest Asia as the 363rd Expeditionary Operations Group, flying a variety of fighter aircraft (F-16, A-10, F-15 and others) from 1998 to 2003.

== History ==
=== World War II ===
==== 363rd Fighter Group ====
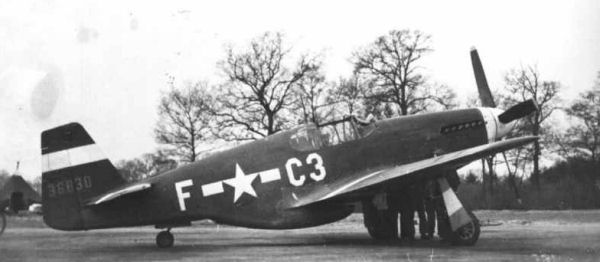
382nd Fighter Squadron P-51B Mustang (Note: Aircraft is North American P-51B-5 Mustang, serial 43-6830 at RAF Rivenhall.)

The 363rd Intelligence, Surveillance, and Reconnaissance Group was first organized as the 363rd Fighter Group, which was activated on 1 August 1943 at Hamilton Field, California. Its original fighter squadrons (380th, 381st and 382nd) trained with Bell P-39 Airacobras at Hamilton and other airfields in California and served as part of the air defense force.

The group moved to England in December 1943 for duty with the Ninth Air Force. At RAF Keevil, the group was re-equipped with North American P-51 Mustang in January 1944 and entered combat in February. The group escorted bombers and fighter-bombers to targets in France, Germany, and the Low Countries; strafed and dive-bombed trains, marshalling yards, bridges, vehicles, airfields, troops, gun positions, and other targets on the Continent.

The 363rd supported the D-Day invasion of Normandy in June 1944 by escorting troop carriers and gliders and by attacking enemy positions near the front lines, and moved to the European Continent at the end of June to take part in the Allied drive to the German border.

In the two weeks following D-Day, the 363rd experienced the most fruitful period of its service in the European Theater of Operations when patrols over France brought it actions with a total of 19 confirmed victories. However, a similar number of Mustangs were lost, albeit mostly to ground fire. During operations from the United Kingdom, the group was credited with 41 victories but lost 43 of its own aircraft in the process.

==== 363rd Tactical Reconnaissance Group ====
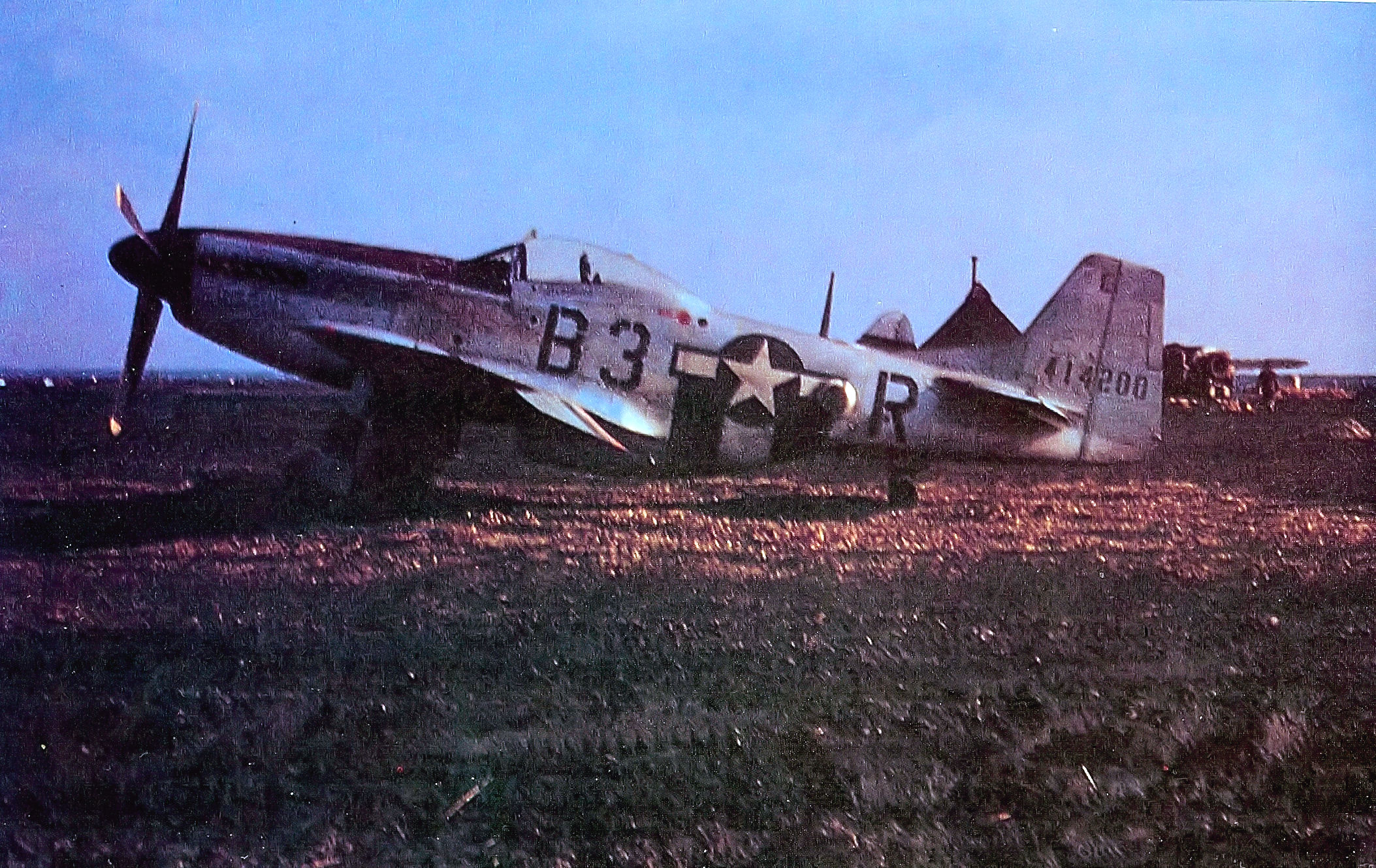
161st Tactical Reconnaissance Squadron P-51D Mustang (Note: Aircraft is North American P-51D-10-NA Mustang serial 44-14852 at Le Culot Airfield (A-89), Belgium, November 1944.)

On the continent, the 363rd was reorganized into a reconnaissance group flying the Lockheed F-5 Lightning photographic reconnaissance version of the P-38 and the F-6 photo-reconnaissance version of the P-51 Mustang at Le Mans Airfield, France. The 380th, 381st and 382nd Squadrons were redesignated as the 160th, 161st and 162nd Tactical Reconnaissance Squadrons respectively. The group flew photographic missions to support both air and ground operations; directed fighter-bombers to railway, highway, and waterway traffic, bridges, gun positions, troop concentrations, and other opportune targets; adjusted artillery fire; and took photographs to assess results of Allied bombardment operations.

It received two Belgian citations for reconnaissance activities, including the group's support of the assault on the Siegfried Line and its participation in the Battle of the Bulge (December 1944 – January 1945). The 363rd assisted Ninth Army's drive across the Rhine and deep into Germany during the period from February 1945 to V-E Day, eventually being stationed at Wiesbaden, Germany (Y-80) at the end of hostilities in May

The 363rd returned to the United States in December 1945 and was inactivated on 11 December 1945 at Camp Kilmer, New Jersey.

=== Cold War ===
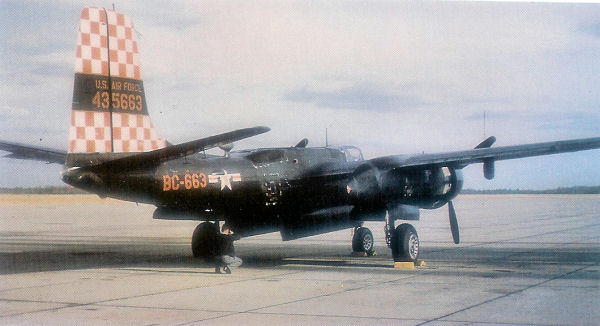
RB-26 Invader at Shaw AFB (Note: Aircraft is Douglas RB-26C-45-DT Invader, serial 44-35663.)

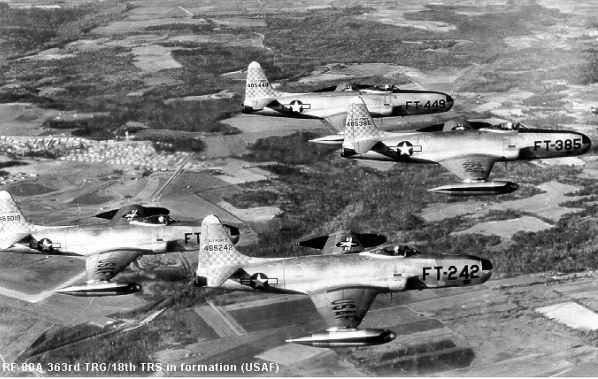
Formation of four RF-80 Shooting Stars (Note: Aircraft are Lockheed RF-80A-15-LO Shooting Stars, serials 44-85242, 44-85019, 44-85448, and 44-85386.)

The 363rd Tactical Reconnaissance Group was reactivated on 29 July 1946 at Brooks Field, Texas. Initially assigned two squadrons (161st and 162nd) flying Lockheed FP-80 Shooting Stars for daylight (161st Squadron) and Douglas FA-26 Invaders (162nd Squadron) for night reconnaissance. The FA-26C was an A-26 with all guns removed and cameras installed throughout the aircraft. Additionally, aircraft intended for night reconnaissance were equipped with photo flash bombs. Some aircraft were also modified for electronic reconnaissance with the installation of radar and signal intelligence gathering equipment.

The FP-80A was a P-80A, with a longer and deeper nose to house cameras in place of the guns in the nose of the aircraft. After the end of the Korean War, the RF-80As were partially brought up to F-80C standards. These RF-80Cs had improved camera installations in a nose of modified contour

The group was placed under the newly activated 363rd Reconnaissance Wing on 15 August 1947 as part of the experimental Wing Base Organization, which placed all tactical and support units on a base under a single wing. It moved to Langley Field, Virginia in December 1947 by the newly established USAF. It was redesignated the 363rd Tactical Reconnaissance Group on 27 August 1948. For budgetary reasons the wing was inactivated on 26 April 1949, however it was again activated on 1 September 1950 at Langley.

Due to the pressing needs of the Far East Air Forces in Japan the 162nd Squadron, flying RB-26s, and the photo-processing 363rd Reconnaissance Technical Squadron moved from Langley to Itazuke Air Base Japan for Korean War service and began operations in August 1950 as part of the 543rd Tactical Support Group. The group's two remaining squadrons were renumbered as the 16th and 18th Tactical Reconnaissance Squadrons in October 1950 as a result of the Air Force's police of reserving numbers between 101 and 300 for units of the Air National Guard.

On 1 April 1951, the 363rd moved to Shaw Air Force Base, South Carolina. The group's mission was to fly photographic, electronic and electronic intelligence missions to support both air and ground operations by American or Allied ground forces.

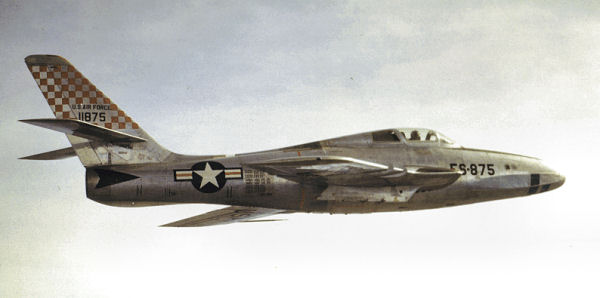
363rd Group RF-84F Thunderflash (Note: Aircraft is Republic RF-84F-10-RE Thunderflash, serial No. 51-1875.)

In 1954, the Republic RF-84F Thunderflash was assigned to the 363rd. The RF-84F was the photographic reconnaissance version of the F-84F Thunderstreak. It had many components in common with the F-84F, but differed in having the jet engine fed by a pair of wing root air intakes, the nose being taken up by a bank of cameras. The USAF was in need of a replacement for its aging Lockheed RF-80 Shooting Star unarmed reconnaissance aircraft, and concluded that the F-84F with its wing root air intakes made a good camera-carrying reconnaissance aircraft.

The aircraft camera bay in the nose could accommodate up to six cameras in forward- facing, trimetrogon and individual oblique and vertical installations. The vertical camera bay had hydraulically operated retractable doors, and behind these doors was an aperture for a vertical viewfinder with a periscope presentation on the cockpit panel. Photoflash ejectors could be carried in underwing tanks for nighttime photographic reconnaissance missions. Deliveries of the RF-84F Thunderflash began in March 1954, with the 363rd Tactical Reconnaissance Wing being the first USAF recipient. The service life of the RF-84F with the 363rd was relatively short, and they were replaced by the McDonnell RF-101 Voodoo aircraft in 1957/1958.

The first USAF Douglas RB-66B Destroyers were issued to the group's 9th Tactical Reconnaissance Squadron in January 1956. They replaced the obsolescent RB-26 Invader for night reconnaissance missions. Two more squadrons were equipped with RB-66Bs by the end of the year. The RB-66B very soon became the primary night photographic reconnaissance weapon system of the Tactical Air Command.

In addition to the RB-66B, RB-66C models entered service with the 9th Squadron in February 1956. RB-66C models carried additional electronic countermeasures (ECM) equipment in wingtip pods. Chaff dispensing pods could be carried underneath the wing outboard of the engine nacelles. Later examples had the tail turret removed and replaced by additional ECM equipment installed in an extended tailcone. After the tail guns were removed, the gunner's position was usually left empty unless occupied by an instructor pilot or instructor navigator.

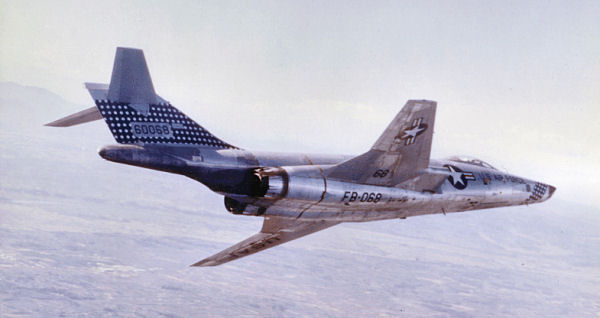
363rd Tactical Reconnaissance Group F-101 Voodoo (Note: Aircraft is McDonnell RF-101C-65-MC Voodoo, serial 56–68. This aircraft is currently on static display at the Keesler Air Force Base, Mississippi Air Park.)

In January 1953, the USAF asked McDonnell Aircraft to develop an unarmed photographic reconnaissance version of the F-101 Voodoo as a possible replacement for the Republic RF-84F Thunderflash. The first RF-101A was delivered to the 17th Tactical Reconnaissance Squadron on 6 May 1957 as a replacement for the subsonic RF-84F. The RF-101A had a redesigned and longer nose housing four cameras designed for low-altitude photography. In addition, two high-altitude cameras were mounted behind the cockpit in place of the ammunition boxes of the fighter variant.

In September 1957, the RF-101C began deliveries to Shaw. The C model combined the strengthened structure of the F-101C with the camera installation of the RF-101A. In addition, the RF-101C differed from the RF-101A in being able to accommodate a centerline nuclear weapon, so that it could carry out a secondary nuclear strike mission if ever called upon to do so. The RF-101Cs served for a brief time alongside the RF-101A, but quickly replaced them by May 1958.

On 8 February 1958, as part of the conversion of Tactical Air Command Wings to the dual deputy organizations, the 363rd Tactical Reconnaissance Group was inactivated and its personnel and equipment were assigned directly to the 363rd Wing, reporting to the wing's deputy commander for operations.

=== Reactivation as a fighter unit ===
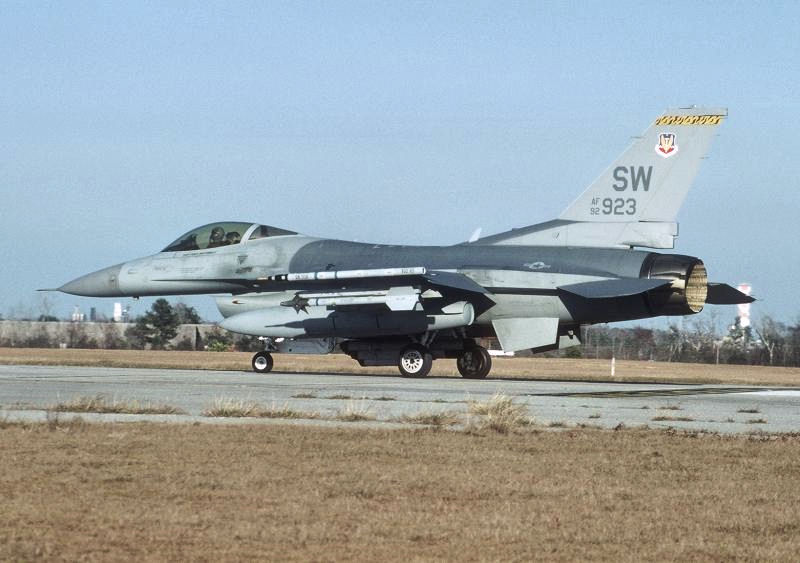
F-16C Fighting Falcon of the 79th Fighter Squadron (Note: Aircraft is General Dynamics F-16C serial 92-3923.)

The group was redesignated the 363rd Operations Group and was activated on 1 May 1992 when the 363rd Fighter Wing implemented the USAF Objective Wing organization. The group was assigned the fighter squadrons of the wing and an operations support squadron upon activation. All aircraft carried the "SW" Tail Code.

With the closure of Myrtle Beach Air Force Base South Carolina and the inactivation of the 354th Fighter Wing, the 21st Tactical Fighter Squadron was activated at Shaw and received 30 Fairchild Republic OA-10 Thunderbolt IIs from the inactivating 355th Fighter Squadron on 1 April 1992.

As a result of the August 1992 destruction of Homestead Air Force Base, Florida, by Hurricane Andrew in September 1992, the 31st Fighter Wing's 309th Fighter Squadron was initially evacuated to Shaw prior to the hurricane making landfall. With Homestead unusable for an extended period after the hurricane, on 1 October 1992 the squadron was permanently assigned to the group. The 33rd Fighter Squadron was inactivated on 15 November 1993. Its F-16C/D aircraft were transferred to the Air National Guard.

As a result of the end of the Cold War, the Air Force began a series of changes, inactivating and redesignating units large and small. The 363rd Group and all of its squadrons were inactivated on 31 December 1993, being replaced at Shaw by the 20th Operations Group, which moved on paper to Shaw from RAF Upper Heyford in the United Kingdom.

=== Expeditionary operations ===
The group was converted to provisional status and renamed the 363rd Expeditionary Operations Group was activated on 1 December 1998. The 363rd was the primary United States Air Force air expeditionary group responsible for Operation Southern Watch, which involved patrolling the Southern No-Fly Zone over Iraq below the 33rd Parallel. The group was inactivated after the 2003 invasion of Iraq, when virtually all U.S. combat units left Saudi Arabia.

=== Intelligence ===
In 2007, the group was withdrawn from provisional status as the 363rd Operations Group, but was not activated until February 2015, when it stood up at Joint Base Langley-Eustis as the 363rd Intelligence, Surveillance, and Reconnaissance Group.

== Lineage ==
- Established as the 363rd Fighter Group (Single Engine) on 11 February 1943

Activated on 1 March 1943
Redesignated 363rd Tactical Reconnaissance Group on 25 August 1944
Redesignated 363rd Reconnaissance Group on 15 June 1945
Inactivated on 11 December 1945

- Activated on 29 June 1946

Redesignated 363rd Tactical Reconnaissance Group 14 June 1948

- Redesiginated 363rd Operations Group and activated on 1 May 1992

Inactivated on 31 December 1993

- Redesignated 363rd Expeditionary Operations Group and converted to provisional status on 19 November 1998

Activated on 1 December 1998
Inactivated on 26 August 2003

- Redesignated 363rd Operations Group returned to permanent status on 24 May 2007
- Redesignated 363rd Intelligence, Surveillance, and Reconnaissance Group on 13 February 2015

Activated on 17 February 2015

=== Assignments ===
- IV Fighter Command, 1 March 1943
- San Francisco Air Defense Wing, 12 April 1943
- IX Fighter Command, 30 December 1943
- 70th Fighter Wing, February 1944
- 100th Fighter Wing, 15 April 1944
- 303rd Fighter Wing, 20 August 1944
- Ninth Air Force, 5 September 1944
- XXIX Tactical Air Command (Provisional), 3 October 1944
- IX Fighter Command, 1 December 1944 (attached to XXIX Tactical Air Command (Provisional))
- 64th Fighter Wing, 18 May 1945
- XII Tactical Air Command, 15 November 1945
- Theater Service Forces, European Theater, 20 November–c. 2 December 1945
- Unknown 3–11 December 1945
- Ninth Air Force, 29 June 1946 (Note: Bailey gives 29 July, apparently a typo.)
- 363rd Reconnaissance Wing (later 363rd Tactical Reconnaissance Wing), 15 August 1947 (Note: The 363rd Reconnaissance Wing was a Table of Distribution Wing under the experimental Wing/Base organization, the 363rd Tactical Reconnaissance Wing was a Table of Organization wing, which replaced it on 27 August 1948. Ravenstein, p. 191. The two wings were consolidated in 1984 and are treated as a single unit.)
- Ninth Air Force, 26 April 1949 (attached to 4th Fighter Wing (later 4th Fighter-Interceptor Wing))
- Tactical Air Command, 1 August 1950
- 363rd Tactical Reconnaissance Wing, 1 September 1950 – 8 February 1958
- 363rd Fighter Wing, 1 May 1992 – 30 December 1993
- Air Combat Command, to activate or inactivate as needed, 19 November 1998 – 24 May 2007

363rd Air Expeditionary Wing, 1 December 1998 – 26 August 2003

- 363rd Intelligence, Surveillance, and Reconnaissance Wing, 13 February 2015 – present

=== Operational components ===
Permanent units

- 9th Tactical Reconnaissance Squadron: 11 November 1953 – 8 February 1958
- 10th Fighter-Interceptor Squadron: attached 19 October 1950 – 1 December 1950
- 12th Tactical Reconnaissance Squadron: 29 July 1946 – 24 July 1947
- 15th Tactical Reconnaissance Squadron: attached, 22 August – 3 November 1948
- 16th Tactical Reconnaissance Squadron: see 380th Fighter Squadron
- 17th Tactical Reconnaissance Squadron: 2 April 1951 – 8 February 1958
- 17th Fighter Squadron, 1 May 1992 – 30 December 1993
- 18th Tactical Reconnaissance Squadron: see 381st Fighter Squadron
- 19th Fighter Squadron, 1 May 1992 – 30 December 1993
- 21st Fighter Squadron, 1 April 1992 – 30 December 1993
- 22nd Tactical Reconnaissance Squadron: attached 29 July – 31 August 1946
- 31st Tactical Reconnaissance Squadron: 23 May – 25 June 1945
- 33rd Fighter Squadron: 1 May 1992 – 15 November 1993
- 33rd Photographic Reconnaissance Squadron: 30 October 1944 – 17 May 1945, c. 5 July – 20 August 1945
- 39th Photographic Reconnaissance Squadron: 23 May – 25 June 1945
- 45th Reconnaissance Squadron: 23 May – 12 July 1945
- 84th Bombardment Squadron: attached 17 October 1949 – 1 September 1950
- 85th Bombardment Squadron: attached 17 October 1949 – 1 September 1950
- 155th Photographic Reconnaissance Squadron: 23 May – 12 July 1945
- 160th Tactical Reconnaissance Squadron: see 380th Fighter Squadron
- 161st Tactical Reconnaissance Squadron: see 381st Fighter Squadron
- 162nd Tactical Reconnaissance Squadron: see 382nd Fighter Squadron
- 309th Fighter Squadron: attached 28 August – 19 November 1982, assigned 19 November 1992 – 30 December 1993
- 380th Fighter Squadron (later 160th Tactical Reconnaissance Squadron, 160th Reconnaissance Squadron 160th Tactical Reconnaissance Squadron 16th Tactical Reconnaissance Squadron): 1 March 1943 – 15 November 1945; 24 July 1947 – 26 April 1949, 1 September 1950 – 8 February 1958
- 381st Fighter Squadron (later 161st Tactical Reconnaissance Squadron 161st Reconnaissance Squadron, 161st Tactical Reconnaissance Squadron, 18th Tactical Reconnaissance Squadron): 1 March 1943 – 3 July 1945 (detached 23 December 1944 – 3 January 1945); 31 August 1946 – 23 September 1949 (detached after 20 September 1949), 2 April 1951 – 8 February 1958
- 382nd Fighter Squadron (later 162nd Tactical Reconnaissance Squadron, 162nd Reconnaissance Squadron, 162nd Tactical Reconnaissance Squadron): 1 March 1943 – 29 September 1944; 29 July 1946 – 10 October 1950 (detached after 18 August 1950)
- 2215th Combat Crew Training Squadron (later 4400th Combat Crew Training Squadron): attached 1 September 1950 – 12 March 1951
- 4400th Combat Crew Training Squadron: see 2215th Combat Crew Training Squadron

Expeditionary units

- 27th Expeditionary Fighter Squadron: 21 June – 13 August 1999
- 58th Expeditionary Fighter Squadron: 15 January – 2 March 1999
- 60th Expeditionary Fighter Squadron: 10 December 1998 – 25 January 1999
- 71st Expeditionary Fighter Squadron: 1–21 December 1998
- 78th Expeditionary Fighter: 1–18 December 1998
- 79th Expeditionary Fighter Squadron: 18 December 1998 – 8 February 1999
- 94th Expeditionary Fighter: 13 Aug 1999 – 26 August 2003
- 363rd Expeditionary Air Refueling Squadron: 1 Dec 1998 – 26 August 2003
- 363rd Expeditionary Airborne Air Control: 1 Dec 1998 – 26 August 2003
- 363rd Expeditionary Airlift Squadron: I Dec 1998–26 August 2003
- 363rd Expeditionary Communications Squadron: I Dec 1998–26 August 2003
- 363rd Expeditionary Reconnaissance Squadron 1 Dec 1998 – 26 August 2003
- 389th Expeditionary Fighter Squadron: 8 February – 23 March 1999
- 390th Expeditionary Fighter Squadron: 2 March – 21 June 1999
- 763rd Expeditionary Reconnaissance Squadron: 1 December 1998 – 26 August 2003

=== Stations ===
- Hamilton Field, California, 1 March 1943
- Santa Rosa Army Air Field, California, August 1943
- Mather Field, California, October-c. 3 December 1943
- RAF Keevil (AAF-471), England, c. 23 December 1943
- RAF Rivenhall (AAF-168), England, January 1944
- RAF Staplehurst (AAF-413), England, April 1944
- Maupertus-sur-Mer Airfield (A-15), France, c. 1 July 1944
- Azeville Airfield (A-7), France, August 1944
- Le Mans Airfield (A-35), France, September 1944
- Sandweiler Airfield (A-97), Luxembourg, c. 1 October 1944
- Le Culot Airfield (A-89), Belgium, c. 29 October 1944
- Venlo Airfield (Y-55), Netherlands, March 1945
- Gütersloh Airfield (Y-99), Germany, c. 15 April 1945
- Brunswick/Waggum Airfield (R-37), Germany, c. 22 April 1945
- AAF Station Wiesbaden (Y-80), Germany, 17 May 1945
- AAF Station Eschwege (R-11), Germany, August 1945
- AAF Station Darmstadt/Griesheim (Y-76), Germany, September-c. 2 December 1945
- Camp Kilmer, New Jersey, c. 9–11 December 1945
- Brooks Field, Texas, 29 July 1946
- Langley Field (later Langley Air Force Base), Virginia, 20 December 1946
- Shaw Air Force Base, South Carolina, c. 2 April 1951 – 8 February 1958
- Shaw Air Force Base, South Carolina, 1 May 1992 – 31 December 1993
- Al Kharj Air Base (later Prince Sultan Air Base), Saudi Arabia, 1 December 1998 – 25 August 2003
- Joint Base Langley-Eustis, 13 February 2015 – present

=== Aircraft ===
- Bell P-39 Airacobra, 1943
- Lockheed F-5 Lightning, 1944–1945
- North American P-51 Mustang, 1944
- North American F-6 Mustang, 1944–1945, 1946
- Lockheed FP-80 (later RF-80) Shooting Star, 1946‑1949, 1951‑1954
- Douglas FA-26 (later RB-26) Invader, 1946–1956
- Republic RF-84F Thunderflash, 1954‑1958
- Martin RB-57A Canberra, 1954‑1956
- Lockheed T‑33 T-Bird, 1955‑1957
- McDonnell RF-101 Voodoo, 1957‑1958
- Douglas RB-66 Destroyer, 1956‑1958
- General Dynamics F-16 Fighting Falcon, 1992‑1993
- Fairchild Republic OA-10 Thunderbolt II, 1992‑1993
- Controlled aircraft operated by other organizations while in provisional status
