= Maupertus-sur-Mer Airfield =

Maupertus-sur-Mer Airfield Advanced Landing Ground (ALG) A-15
- Manche, Basse-Normandie Region, France
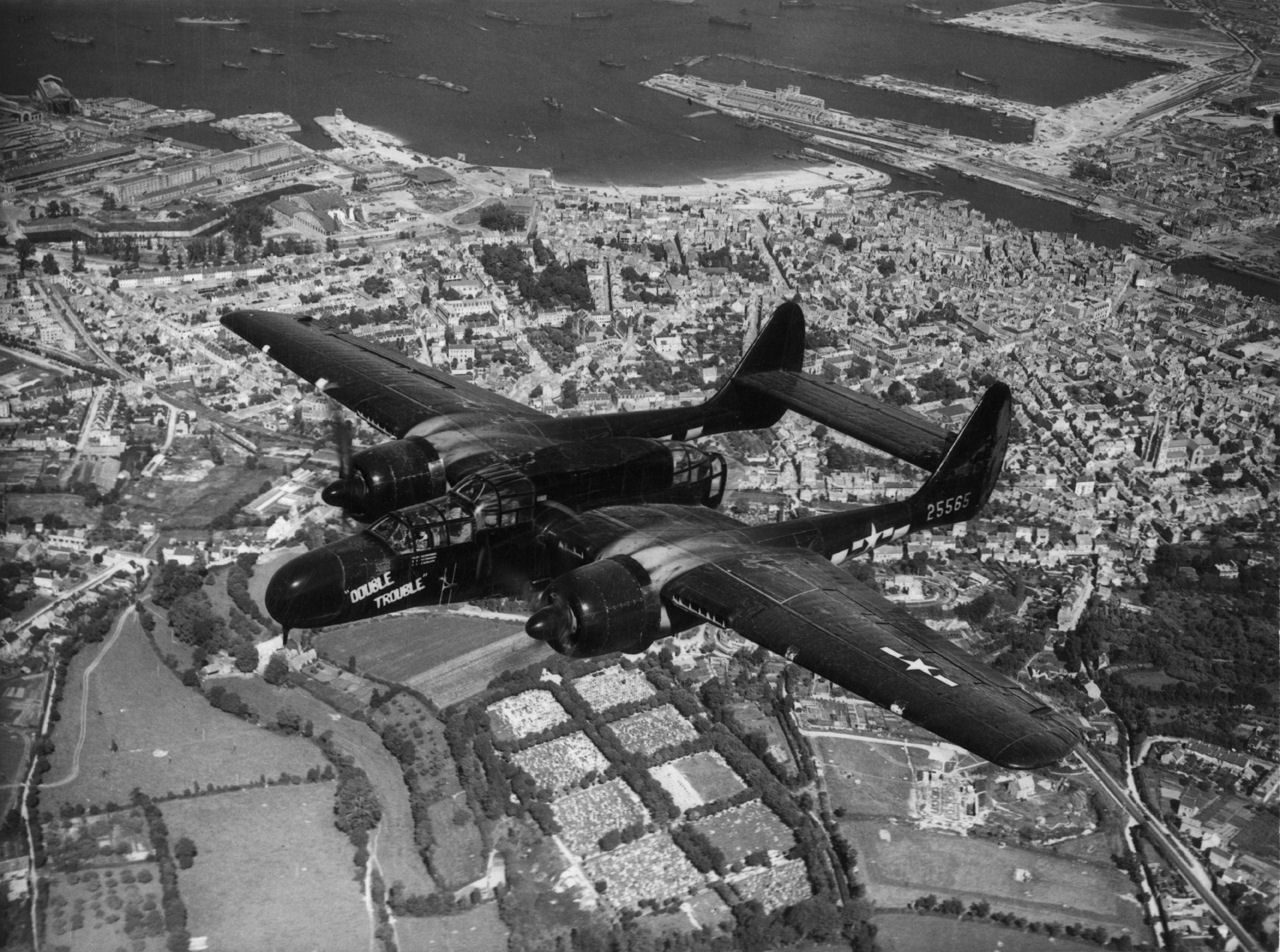
- A P-61 Black Widow (serial number 42-5565) nicknamed "Double Trouble" of the 422nd Night Fighter Squadron over Cherbourg, France

Site information
- Type: Military Airfield
- Controlled by: French Air Force; Luftwaffe; United States Army Air Forces

Location
- Coordinates: 49°39′03″N 001°28′31″W

Site history
- Built: 1937
- Built by: French Air Force; Rebuilt by: IX Engineering Command
- In use: 1937 July–September 1944
- Materials: Grass; Later: Prefabricated Hessian Surfacing (PHS)
- Battles/wars: World War II - EAME Theater: Battle of France (1940); Occupation of France (1940-1944); Normandy Campaign; Northern France Campaign

Garrison information
- Garrison: Ninth Air Force
- Occupants: 422d Night Fighter Squadron; 387th Bombardment Group; 363d Fighter Group

Airfield information
- Elevation: 459 ft / 140 m AMSL
Runways
Direction	Length and surface
17/35	5,000 feet (1,520 m) SMT/PSP
10/28	6,000 feet (1,830 m) SMT/PSP
- Two Runways, 4 alert pads, 50 hardstands

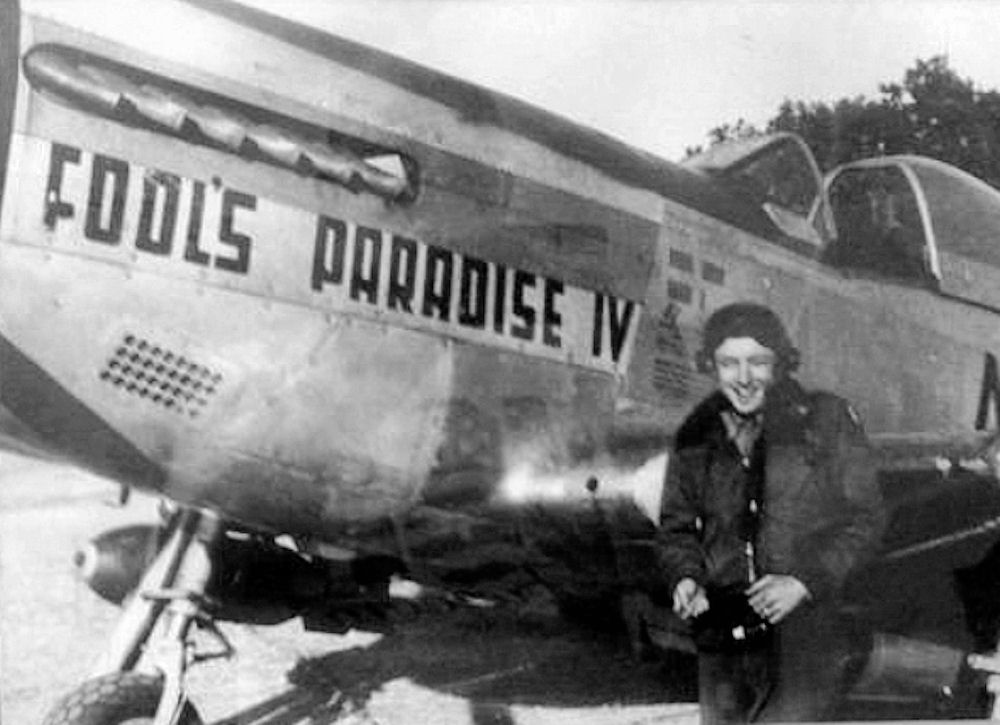
Major Evan Mc Call and P-51D 44-13309 "Fools Paradise IV". of the 363d Fighter Group

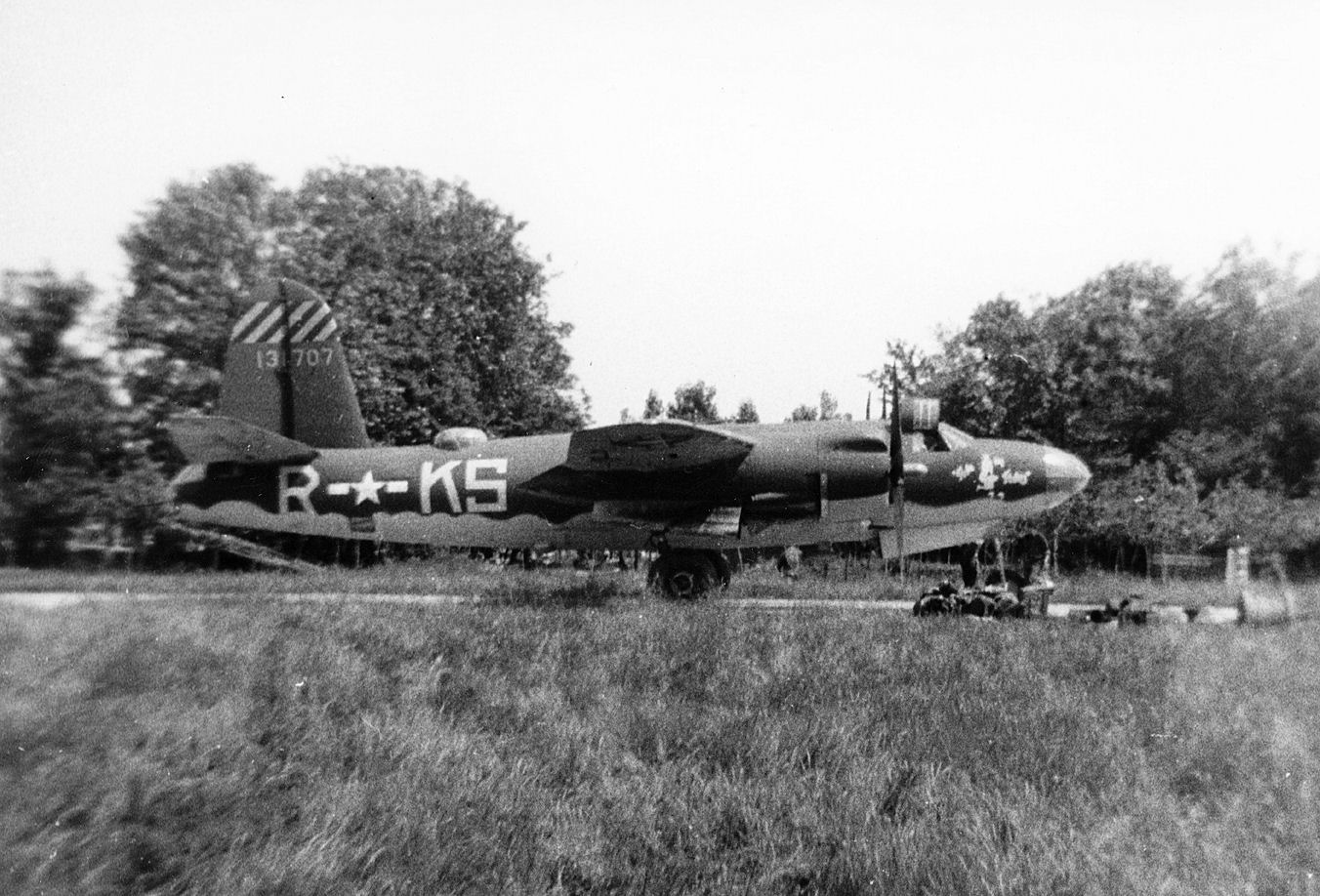
A B-26 Marauder (KS-R, serial number 41-31707) nicknamed "Five By Fives" of the 557th Bomb Squadron, 387th Bomb Group.

Maupertus-sur-Mer Airfield is a former World War II military airfield, which is located near the city of Cherbourg-Octeville in the Manche department of Lower Normandy in northwestern France.

The facility was built as a French military airfield in 1937 before World War II. Used by the Germans during the Occupation of France, it was seized by the United States Army on 27 June 1944 during the Normandy Campaign.

Reconstructed by the IX Engineering Command, 850th Engineer Aviation Battalion, it was used as a combat airfield. After the war, it was returned to the French government, and today it is the civil Cherbourg – Maupertus Airport.

== History ==
The airfield was built by the French Air Force in 1937 as an annex to the military airfield at Querqueville. It consisted of a 1,000m grass runway. In 1939, a concrete perimeter track was added, and on 9 May 1940, it was equipped with Bloch MB.155 fighter aircraft.

During the 1940 Battle of France, the aircraft assigned did not engage in any combat, and it was seized by the occupying German Army in June. It was turned over to the Luftwaffe which assigned Junkers Ju 87 attack aircraft of Jagdgeschwader 2 (JG-2) to the field. During the Dieppe Raid of August 1942, Ju 87s from Maupertus attacked the raiding Allied forces. In the fall of 1942, the Luftwaffe moved the aircraft to the east, and replaced them with six 88mm flak guns, used for anti-aircraft defense of the area.

After the Allied landings in France during June 1944, the United States Army VII Corps reached the airfield on 21 June. The 4th Infantry Division, with the support of the 70th Tank Battalion captured the airfield on 27 June. The 4th's 22nd Regiment moved on the airport from the south and east at 1100 hours on D+20 (June 26), with the three battalions abreast and a troop of cavalry protecting each flank. Heavy fire from enemy antiaircraft guns held up all three battalions for several hours, but, with the aid of supporting fire from the 44th Field Artillery Battalion, the 1st Battalion took a series of positions south of the airport and captured Gonneville, the 2nd Battalion occupied the western edge of the field, and the 3rd Battalion captured Maupertus and the defenses along the northern side of the field.

The enemy, however, continued to offer determined resistance and not until the following day was the airfield finally taken. Designated ALG (Advanced Landing Ground) A-15, the airport became operational a few days later by the 834th Aviation Engineers, IX Engineer Command. 850th Engineer Aviation Battalion and 877th Airborne Engineer Aviation Battalion.

Known as Advanced Landing Ground "A-15", the airfield consisted of a 6000' (1800m) Pierced Steel Planking (PSP) runway aligned 11/29. A secondary PSP 5000' (1500m) runway was also laid down aligned 17/35. In addition, tents were used for billeting and also for support facilities; an access road was built to the existing road infrastructure; a dump for supplies, ammunition, and gasoline drums, along with a drinkable water and minimal electrical grid for communications and station lighting.

The 363d Fighter Group with P-47 Thunderbolts moved into Maupertus on 9 July. Planes began taking off and landing although a pile of bombs, live shells, duds, and 600 mines lifted from the airfield were stacked along the main runway. The fighter planes flew support missions during the Allied invasion of Normandy, patrolling roads in front of the beachhead; strafing German military vehicles and dropping bombs on gun emplacements, anti-aircraft artillery and concentrations of German troops in Normandy and Brittany when spotted. The bombers also attacked bridges and German-controlled airfields in occupied areas.

Prime Minister Churchill landed at A-15 on July 20 as did General Charles de Gaulle on August 20. Eisenhower and Lee used it frequently.

On 22 August, the B-26 Marauder 387th Bombardment Group replaced the 363d. In addition to the bombers, the 422d Night Fighter Squadron, equipped with the P-61 Black Widow night interceptor, used the airfield until the end of August 1944.

After the Americans moved east into Central France with the advancing Allied Armies, the airfield was used as a resupply and casualty evacuation airfield for several months, before being closed on 22 December 1944 and turned over to French authorities.

== Major units assigned ==
- 363d Fighter Group 9 July - 22 August 1944

380th (A8), 381st (B3), 382d (C3) Fighter Squadrons (P-51D)

- 387th Bombardment Group 22 August - 18 September 1944

556th (FW), 557th (KS), 558th (KX), 559th (TQ) Bombardment Squadrons (B-26)

- 422d Night Fighter Squadron 25 July – 28 August 1944 (P-61)

== Postwar use ==
During the reconstruction of France in the late 1940s, a civil airport was established at the site. During the Cold War, in the 1950s, a modern concrete jet runway for NATO aircraft was laid down by the United States using French contractors, along with a circular marguerite system of dispersal hardstands that could be revetted later with earth for added protection. The Cold War air base was never used and was abandoned when France pulled out of the NATO central command structure in 1967.

The remains of the World War II main (11/29) runway are still visible just to the south of the current airport runway. Also a part of the secondary runway was reused as a taxiway to the now aircraft parking area to the south of the runway. The Cold War-era marguerite hardstands appear to be well-maintained, their use being undetermined.

A memorial to the men and units that were stationed at Maupertus-sur-Mer Airfield is located at the front of the terminal building at Cherbourg-Maupertus Airport. It has the shape of an obelisk, on each of its faces are identified land built at that time (A1 to A26), the Fighters wings, groups Fighters, Bombs groups, Liaison Squadron who were based in Normandy, and the Air Engineers Battalions who participated in the construction of land.

== See also ==
- Advanced Landing Ground
