= 9th Combat Operations Squadron =

9th Combat Operations Squadron

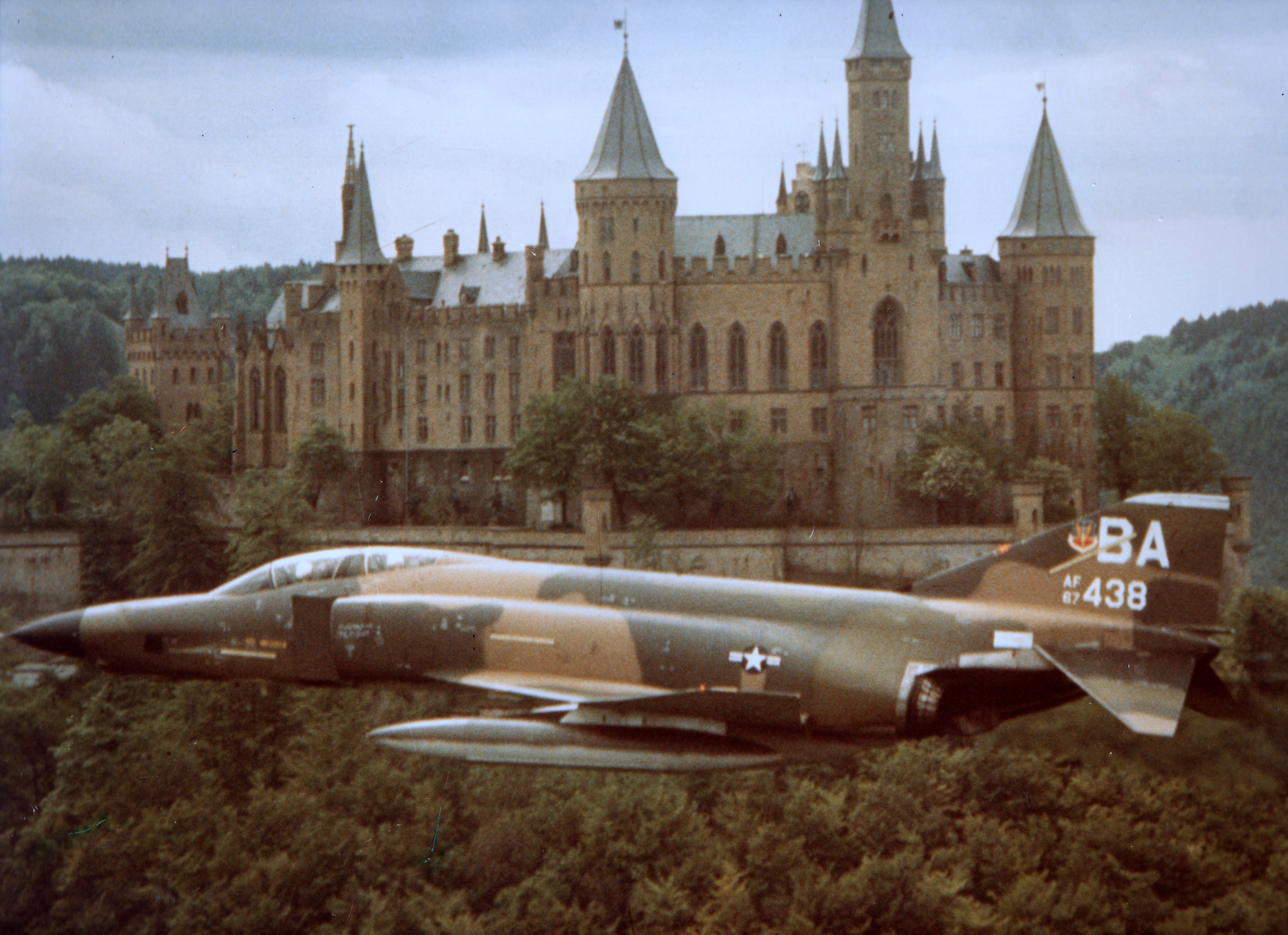
- An RF-4 Phantom II from Bergstrom AFB flies by Hohenzollern Castle. Germany circa 1976 (Note: Aircraft is McDonnell Douglas RF-4C-33-MC Phantom II, serial 67-0438. This plane was sent to the Aerospace Maintenance and Regeneration Center on 9 September 1991. It is now on display at the East Mississippi Veteran's Memorial near Key Field. Baugher, Joe (10 April 2023). "1967 USAF Serial Numbers". Joe Baugher.)
- Active: 1943–1945; 1946–1947; 1953–1971; 1999–present
- Country: United States
- Branch: United States Air Force
- Role: Space operations
- Part of: Air Force Reserve Command
- Garrison/HQ: Vandenberg Space Force Base, California
- Nickname: Blackhawks
- Motto: Semper Summatum (Latin for 'Always the Highest')
- Engagements: European Theater of Operations
- Decorations: Distinguished Unit Citation; Air Force Outstanding Unit Award; Air Force Organizational Excellence Award

Insignia
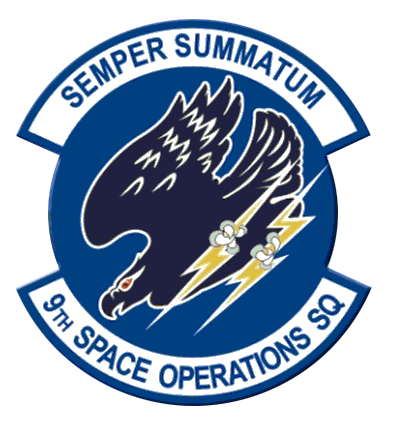
- 9th Combat Operations Squadron emblem (Note: Approved 6 May 1999.)

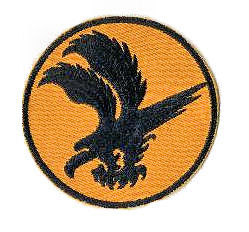
- 9th Reconnaissance Squadron emblem (Note: Approved 14 October 1946. Description: On a yellow disc edged black, a stylized hawk of the second [color mentioned] in flight toward dexter base. The 31st Reconnaissance Squadron continued to use this emblem after it replaced the 9th at Yokota Air Base, rather than its own emblem, but that use was not officially approved.)

The United States Air Force's 9th Combat Operations Squadron is an Air Force Reserve Command space operations unit located at Vandenberg Space Force Base, California. The 9th augments the 614th Air and Space Operations Center in operating the Joint Space Operations Center, performing combat operations, plans, strategy and intelligence assessments that enable the Commander, Joint Functional Component Command for Space to command and control space forces by providing worldwide space effects and theater support to combatant commanders.

The squadron was first activated in 1943 as the 761st Bombardment Squadron. After training in the United States, it deployed to the Mediterranean Theater of Operations, where it participated in the strategic bombing campaign against Germany, and it earned a Distinguished Unit Citation for its actions. Following V-E Day, the squadron moved to Brazil, where it became part of Air Transport Command, returning troops to the United States before it was inactivated on 26 September 1945.

The squadron was redesignated the 9th Reconnaissance Squadron and reactivated in the Far East in 1946. For the next two years, it performed mapping and reconnaissance missions, until it transferred its assets to another unit and was inactivated. It was activated again in 1953 as the 9th Tactical Reconnaissance Squadron, and in 1956, became the first squadron to fly the Douglas RB-66 Destroyer. During the Cuban Missile Crisis, the squadron flew photographic reconnaissance missions. It deployed equipment and personnel to Southeast Asia, although it remained in the United States as a training unit until inactivating in 1971.

The squadron was activated in the reserve in 1999 as the 9th Space Operations Squadron.

== Mission ==
The 9th Combat Operations Squadron is an associate squadron to the 614th Air and Space Operations Center and augments the active duty center in day-to-day operations of the Joint Space Operations Center, a 24-hour operations center designed to provide commanders with assistance coordinating, planning, and conducting space operations.

== Organization ==
The squadron is composed of four divisions that provide steady-state and surge support in the Combined Space Operations Center.

The Combat Operations Division is charged with the effective employment of 58 tactical units and integration of five Joint Force Space Component Command operations centers.

The Strategy Plans Division develops, disseminates, assesses, and refines the Space Operations Directive, Master Space Plan and Combined Space Staking Order in support of functional and geographic combatant commanders' operations. It validates space operations requirements against current and planned operations environments, analyzes space support requests to determine the optimal use of space systems to meet global needs.

The Operations Support Division coordinates and documents initial, certification, and continuation training. It develops "lessons learned" for exercise support, requirements, and unit training, and evaluates their overall effectiveness.

The Intelligence, Surveillance and Reconnaissance Division provides supported combat commands, the intelligence community and subordinate units with current and emerging enemy space capabilities, threats to US and Allied use of space, courses of action, and predictive intelligence through a dynamic space intelligence operation of the operational environment.

== History ==
=== World War II ===
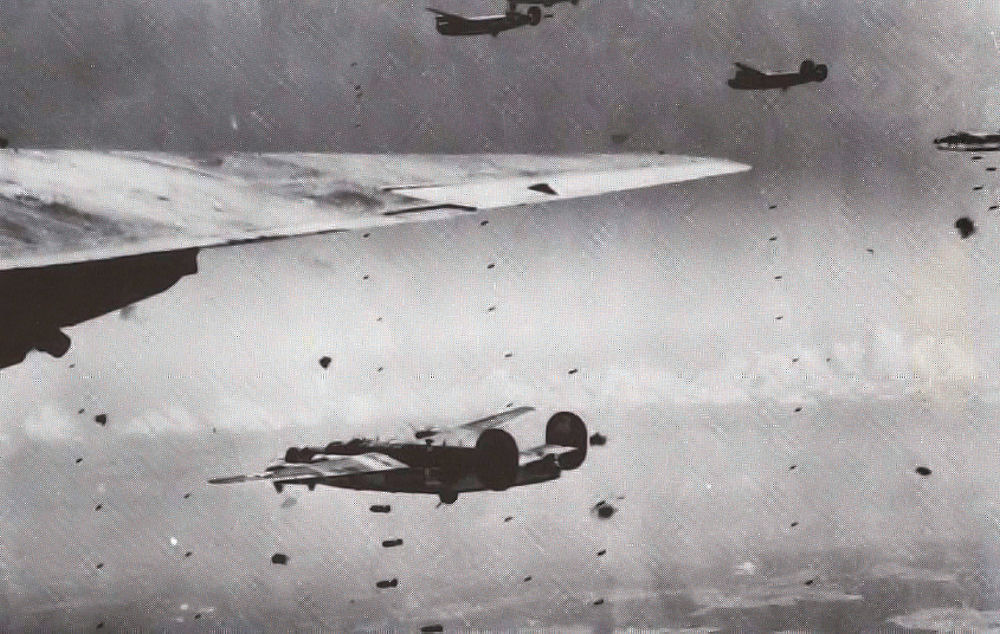
460th Bombardment Group B-24 Liberators bombing

The squadron was first activated as the 761st Bombardment Squadron at Alamogordo Army Air Field, New Mexico on 1 July 1943 as one of the four original squadrons of the 460th Bombardment Group. A cadre of the unit's air echelon went to Orlando Army Air Base, Florida for specialized training with the Army Air Forces School of Applied Tactics. In August, the unit was filled out with ground personnel at Kearns Army Air Base, Utah, then moved to Chatham Army Air Field, Georgia to complete its training with Consolidated B-24 Liberator heavy bombers. Upon completing training, the squadron departed for the Mediterranean Theater of Operations in January 1944.

The squadron completed its deployment to Spinazzola Airfield, Italy by the middle of February 1944, and entered the strategic bombing campaign against Germany the following month, with an attack on a marshalling yard and docks at Metković, Yugoslavia. It attacked oil refineries and storage facilities, railroads, industrial areas, including aircraft manufacturing plants in Austria, Czechoslovakia, France, Germany, Greece, Hungary, Italy, Romania and Yugoslavia.

On 26 July 1944, the squadron was part of a 460th Group formation that led the 55th Bombardment Wing on an attack against an airfield and aircraft manufacturing plant at Zwolfaxing, Austria. It attacked the target through heavy enemy flak and adverse weather, for which it was awarded a Distinguished Unit Citation.

The squadron was occasionally diverted from the strategic bombing mission to perform air interdiction and close air support missions. In August 1944, it supported Operation Dragoon, the invasion of southern France by attacking submarine pens, marshalling yards and artillery batteries in the area of the amphibious landings. It struck lines of communications, railroads, ammunition dumps and other targets in connection with Operation Grapeshot, the allied offensive in Northern Italy. The squadron flew its last mission against a target in northern Italy on 26 April 1945.

After V-E Day, the 460th Group and its squadrons were transferred to the South Atlantic Division, Air Transport Command, moving to Parnamirim Field, near Natal, Brazil to participate in the Green Project. Green Project was aimed at transporting 50,000 military personnel a month from the European and Mediterranean Theaters back to the United States, with priority for those that plans called for redeploying to the Pacific. The squadron's combat veterans proved none too happy with this assignment, but continued supporting the project until inactivating on 26 September 1945.

=== Reconnaissance ===
In 1946, the 761st was redesignated the 9th Reconnaissance Squadron and assigned to the 314th Composite Wing, of Fifth Air Force, at Johnson Air Base and then Yokota Air Base, Japan. 9th airmen flew the Bell P-39 Airacobra, as well as the Consolidated F-7 Liberator, Boeing F-9 Flying Fortress, and Boeing F-13 Superfortress bombers retrofitted to perform photographic reconnaissance performing mapping missions over occupied Japan, Korea, Okinawa, Indochina, and other areas under Far East Air Forces' control after World War II. The squadron also flew classified missions over the Soviet Far East.

The squadron was inactivated in October 1947 and its personnel, equipment and mission were transferred to the 31st Reconnaissance Squadron. The squadron was reactivated at Shaw Air Force Base, South Carolina on 11 November 1953, as the 9th Tactical Reconnaissance Squadron, and was assigned to the 363d Tactical Reconnaissance Group. The squadron's initial equipment was the Douglas RB-26 Invader, plus one North American B-25 Mitchell. These aircraft had been modified with special electronic warfare equipment, including AN/APR-4 and AN/APR-9 radar receivers, and AN/APA-17 direction finders. Some were also fitted with AN/APT-1 jammers and chaff dispensers. Although the unit's wartime role was to fly ferret and stand-off jamming missions, the main task assigned to it was to provide jamming training for ground radar operators.

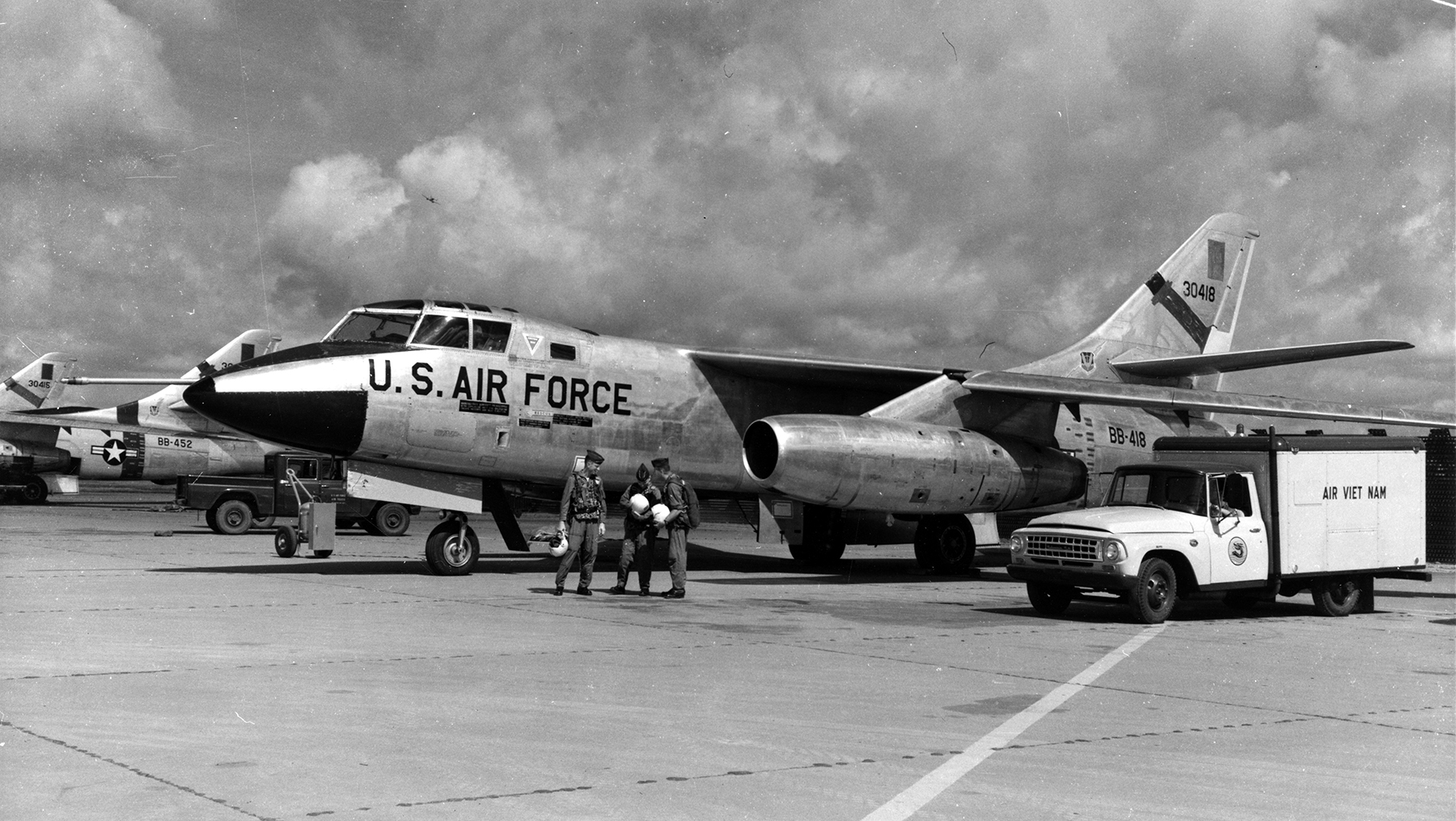
363d Wing RB-66B Destroyer at Tan Son Nhut Airport (Note: Aircraft is Douglas RB-66B-DL Destroyer, serial 53-0418. This plane was transferred to the Military Aircraft Storage and Disposition Center on 11 December 1969. Baugher, Joe (9 June 2023). "1953 USAF Serial Numbers". Joe Baugher.Photo taken in 1965.)

In January 1956, the squadron was the first in the Air Force to receive jet powered Douglas RB-66B Destroyers, which added weather sampling capability. The unit later flew other upgraded models of the plane (RB-66C and WB-66D). The arrival of the B-66s enabled the squadron to retire its RB-26s as well as the Lockheed RT-33A Shooting Stars it had begun using for weather reconnaissance. When Tactical Air Command adopted the dual deputy organization, it inactivated the squadron's parent 363d Reconnaissance Group, and assigned the squadron directly to the 363d Tactical Reconnaissance Wing. In 1961, three of the squadron's WB-66s deployed to Clark Air Base in Operation Long Pass, a joint deployment exercise in the Philippines.

In 1962, 9th had a Navy squadron commander, Commander Chester E. Kingsbury, and flew classified film missions supporting the Cuban Missile Crisis starting in October 1962. Between 1963 and 1966, the 9th routinely deployed aircraft and crews to Southeast Asia and served as an Air Force training squadron for the upgraded B-66 Destroyer.

In 1969, the 9th moved to Bergstrom Air Force Base, Texas, where it became part of the 75th Tactical Reconnaissance Wing and flew McDonnell RF-4 Phantom IIs. On 31 August 1971, the squadron inactivated. The squadron's aircraft and personnel were transferred to the 12th Tactical Reconnaissance Squadron, which moved to Bergstrom on paper from Vietnam as USAF forces in Southeast Asia were reduced.

=== Reserve space operations ===
Since the early 1990s, the space command and control mission evolved rapidly. In 1994, 14th Air Force was activated at Vandenberg Air Force Base, California and became responsible for space operations. Between 1994 and 1998, United States Air Force reservists supported Fourteenth Air Force on various man-day tours, primarily as individual mobilization augmentees. In 1999, Captain Patrick Assayag led a team to discuss the possibility of activating a reserve squadron to support the 614th Space Operations Flight.

On 1 October 1999, the 9th Space Operations Squadron was activated as a reserve squadron with 37 billets and the responsibility of supporting the newly redesignated 614th Space Operations Squadron to build the weekly Space Tasking Order. Many reservists supporting Fourteenth Air Force were then reassigned to the 9th Squadron. At the unit activation ceremony, Major General Robert Hinson, commander of Fourteenth Air Force, stated "our ability to maintain our nation's superiority in space is dependent upon the Air National Guard and Air Force Reserve as critical contributors to part of a cohesive Total Force."

In 2002, the space mission transferred from United States Space Command to United States Strategic Command, as Space Command inactivated. Then in 2003, Strategic Command's Joint Force Component Command was developed, and the Joint Space Operations Center was activated under the command's Space and Global Strike.

In 2005, as the Fiscal Year 2008 Program Objective Memorandum was drafted, Air Force Space Command increased the squadron's manpower authorization from 37 to 126 billets, ensuring additional support to the 614th and the new 614th Space Intelligence Squadron. Also that year, the 1st Space Control Squadron moved to Vandenberg to become part of the 614th Space Operations Squadron. The 1st and 614th Space Operations Squadron combined to form the 614th Air and Space Operations Center in 2007.

In 2010, the command structure of the 9th was adjusted to bring it more in line with the host 614 AOC's O-6 led command and division chief structure.

The 9th was redesignated the 9th Combat Operations Squadron in a ceremony held on 3 June 2017 to follow the name standard of other reserve units associated with Air Operations Centers throughout the Air Force. Today, the 9th is a unit of over 100 space, intelligence and communications professionals, expanding the role of support of the 614th and the Combined Space Operations Center.

== Lineage ==
- Constituted as the 761st Bombardment Squadron (Heavy) on 19 May 1943

Activated on 1 Jul 1943
Redesignated 761st Bombardment Squadron, Heavy on 29 September 1944
Inactivated on 26 September 1945

- Redesignated 9th Reconnaissance Squadron, Very Long Range, Photographic on 29 April 1946

Activated on 20 June 1946
Inactivated on 20 October 1947

- Redesignated 9th Tactical Reconnaissance Squadron, Electronics and Weather on 21 July 1953

Activated on 11 November 1953

- Redesignated 9th Tactical Reconnaissance Squadron, Photo-Jet on 15 May 1965
- Redesignated 9th Tactical Reconnaissance Squadron on 1 October 1966

Inactivated on 31 August 1971

- Redesignated 9th Space Operations Squadron on 5 February 1999

Activated in the reserve on 1 October 1999

- Redesignated 9th Combat Operations Squadron c. 3 June 2017

=== Assignments ===
- 460th Bombardment Group, 1 July 1943 – 26 September 1945
- 314th Composite Wing, 20 June 1946 – 20 October 1947 (attached to 3d Bombardment Group c. 25 Sep 1946; 71st Reconnaissance Group, 22 April 1947; 3d Bombardment Group after 7 May 1947)
- 363d Tactical Reconnaissance Group, 11 November 1953
- 363d Tactical Reconnaissance Wing, 8 February 1958
- 4402d Tactical Training Group, 1 July 1966
- 363 Tactical Reconnaissance Wing, 1 February 1967
- 75th Tactical Reconnaissance Wing, 1 September 1969
- 67th Tactical Reconnaissance Wing, 15 July–31 August 1971
- 310th Space Group, 1 October 1999
- 310th Operations Group, 7 March 2008 – present

=== Stations ===
- Alamogordo Army Air Field, New Mexico, 1 July 1943
- Kearns Army Air Base, Utah, 31 August 1943
- Chatham Army Air Field, Georgia, 29 October 1943 – 3 January 1944
- Spinazzola Airfield, Italy, c. 11 February 1944 – 6 June 1945
- Waller Field, Trinidad, 15 June 1945
- Parnamirim Airport, Brazil, 30 June 1945 – 26 September 1945
- Johnson Air Base, Japan, 20 June 1946
- Yokota Air Base, Japan, c. September 1946 – 20 October 1947
- Shaw Air Force Base, South Carolina, 11 Nov 1953
- Bergstrom Air Force Base, Texas, 1 Sep 1969 – 31 Aug 1971
- Vandenberg Space Force Base, California, 1 Oct 1999 – present

=== Systems operated ===
- Consolidated B-24 Liberator, 1943–1945
- Bell P-39 Airacobra, 1946–1947
- Consolidated F-7 Liberator, 1946–1947
- Beechcraft F-2, 1946–1947
- Boeing F-9 (later FB-17) Flying_Fortress, 1946–1947
- Boeing F-13 Superfortress, 1947
- Douglas RB-26 Invader, 1954–1956
- Lockheed RT-33A Shooting Star, 1955–1956
- Lockheed WT-33 Shooting Star, 1956
- North American TB-25 Mitchell, 1956
- Douglas RB-66 Destroyer, 1956–1966
- Douglas WB-66 Destroyer, 1957–1966
- McDonnell Douglas RF-4 Phantom II, 1965–1967, 1969–1971
- Functional (non-Falconer) Air Operations Center, 2000–Present

=== Awards and campaigns ===
Award streamer	Award	Dates	Notes
	Distinguished Unit Citation	26 July 1944	Austria 761st Bombardment Squadron
	Air Force Outstanding Unit Award	23 October 1962-24 November 1962	9th Tactical Reconnaissance Squadron
	Air Force Outstanding Unit Award	1 November 1969-31 May 1971	9th Tactical Reconnaissance Squadron
	Air Force Outstanding Unit Award	15 July 1971-31 August 1971	9th Tactical Reconnaissance Squadron
	Air Force Outstanding Unit Award	1 October 2002–30 July 2004	9th Space Operations Squadron
	Air Force Outstanding Unit Award	1 August 2004–31 July 2006	9th Space Operations Squadron
	Air Force Outstanding Unit Award	1 August 2006–31 July 2008	9th Space Operations Squadron
	Air Force Organizational Excellence Award	1 October 2001–30 September 2003	9th Space Operations Squadron

Campaign Streamer	Campaign	Dates	Notes
	Air Offensive, Europe	c. 11 February 1944 – 5 June 1944	761st Bombardment Squadron
	Air Combat, EAME Theater	c. 11 February 1944 – 11 May 1945	761st Bombardment Squadron
	Rome-Arno	c. 11 February 1944 – 9 September 1944	761st Bombardment Squadron
	Central Europe	22 March 1944 – 21 May 1945	761st Bombardment Squadron
	Normandy	6 June 1944 – 24 July 1944	761st Bombardment Squadron
	Northern France	25 July 1944 – 14 September 1944	761st Bombardment Squadron
	Southern France	15 August 1944 – 14 September 1944	761st Bombardment Squadron
	North Apennines	10 September 1944 – 4 April 1945	761st Bombardment Squadron
	Rhineland	15 September 1944 – 21 March 1945	761st Bombardment Squadron
	Po Valley	3 April 1945 – 8 May 1945	761st Bombardment Squadron
	American Theater without inscription	15 June 1945–25 September 1945	761st Bombardment Squadron

== See also ==
- List of United States Air Force reconnaissance squadrons
- List of F-4 Phantom II operators
- List of A-26 Invader operators
- List of B-29 Superfortress operators
- B-24 Liberator units of the United States Army Air Forces
