= Dolphin D. Overton =

United States Air Force flying ace

Dolphin D. Overton III
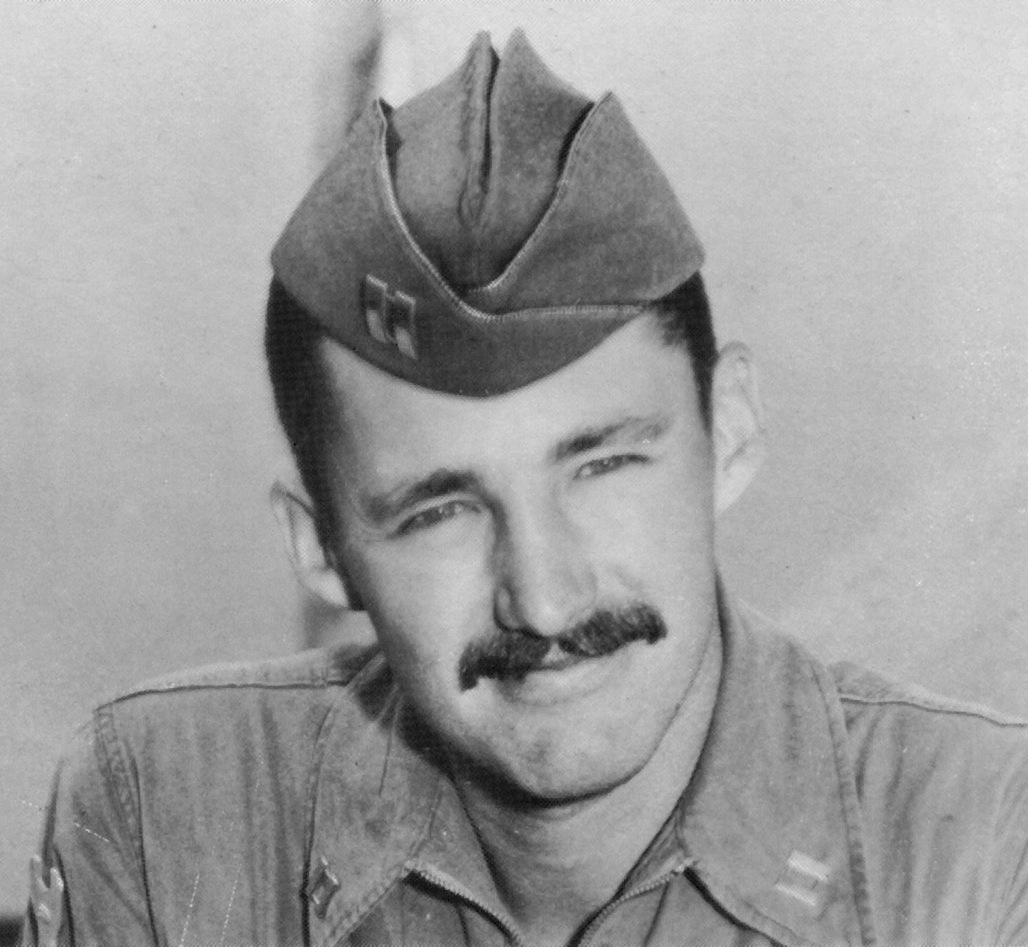
- Captain Dolphin D. Overton in 1950
- Born: 2 April 1927; Andrews, South Carolina
- Died: 25 March 2013 (aged 86); Georgetown, South Carolina
- Military career
- Branch: United States Navy; United States Air Force
- Service years: 1944–1945; 1949–1953
- Rank: First Lieutenant
- Nickname: "Dolph"
- Units: 31st Fighter Group; 8th Fighter-Bomber Squadron; 16th Fighter-Interceptor Squadron
- Conflicts: World War II; Korean War; MiG alley
- Awards: Distinguished Service Cross; Silver Star (4); Distinguished Flying Cross (5); Air Medal (9)

Dolphin Dunnaha Overton III (2 April 1927 – 25 March 2013) was a United States Air Force aviator who became a flying ace during the Korean War. Overton's controversial tour in Korea led to his being removed from combat and denied his medals and victory credits, but he was subsequently reinstated with these.

Born in Andrews, South Carolina, Overton took an early interest in flying, and attended The Citadel for a year before enlisting in the United States Navy briefly during World War II. Afterward, Overton graduated from West Point and began a career flying the F-84 Thunderjet. In 1952, Overton volunteered to fly in the Korean War and flew 102 missions in an F-84 before transferring to the 16th Fighter-Interceptor Squadron and flying the F-86 Sabre. During a four-day time period in early 1953, Overton claimed five MiG-15 victories in MiG alley, certifying him as a flying ace. However, he was subsequently returned to the United States in shame after commanders charged him with insubordination for crossing the Yalu River into Manchuria for his victories.

Subsequent research and debate has pointed to Overton as a scapegoat for an informal policy of US pilots regularly violating the Yalu River border into China, and that the US military discredited Overton as a way to prevent an international incident. Overton was finally given the medals he had earned in the war—including a Distinguished Service Cross and four Silver Stars—in 2009.

== Early life ==
Dolphin D. Overton was born on 2 April 1927 in Andrews, South Carolina. He was interested in flying from an early age, and as a boy he flew with his father. He became an avid reader of stories from World War I flying aces. At age 16, Overton was flying solo in a Piper J-3 Cub.

Overton graduated from high school and began college at The Citadel in Charleston, South Carolina in 1943, at the age of 16, but one year later he dropped out in an attempt to enlist in the United States Navy. Overton attempted to become a naval aviator in 1945 but there was little demand for additional aviators at the time, as the war was nearing its end.

After being discharged from the Navy, Overton earned an appointment to the United States Military Academy, graduating in 1949 and being commissioned as a second lieutenant. Overton became one of 92 graduates to join the newly formed United States Air Force. In 1950, Overton earned his aviator wings after a year of training at Williams Air Force Base in Phoenix, Arizona, alongside Ivan Kincheloe, who would later also become a flying ace in Korea.

== Air Force career ==
Overton's first assignment was with the 31st Fighter Group at Turner Air Force Base in Albany, Georgia, commanded by David C. Schilling, and flying the F-84 Thunderjet, a fighter-bomber. Shortly after the beginning of this assignment, Overton nearly died in a training incident. On his third flight in the F-84, as he tried to set a record for completing an obstacle course in the shortest time, he was involved in a major crash. The crash threatened to end his career, but Schilling, determined to prevent Overton from being discharged, gave him extra assignments to keep him in the military.

Overton flew F-84s with the 31st Fighter Group. He was a part of the first major trans-Atlantic deployment of F-84s to the United Kingdom in late 1950. He volunteered for deployment to South Korea to serve in the Korean War in 1951.

=== First Korean War tour ===
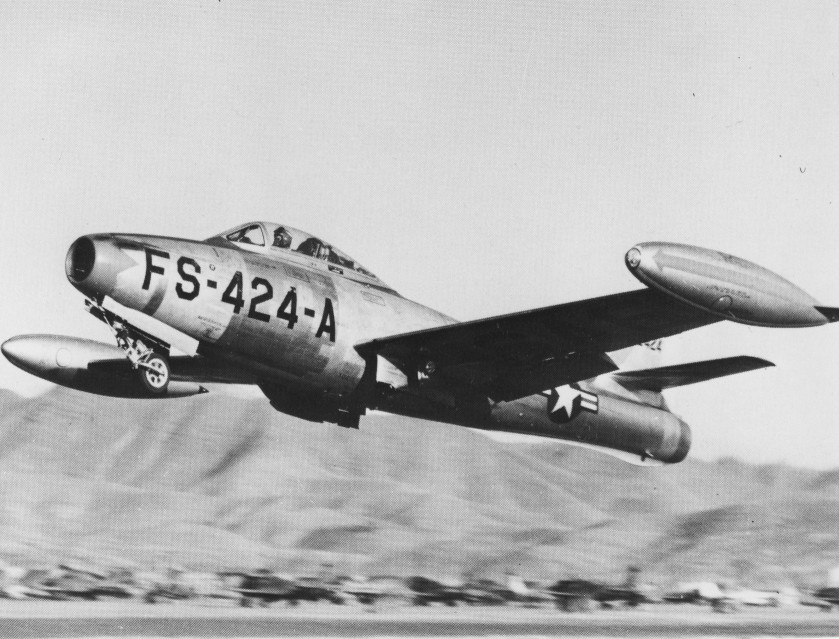
The F-84 Thunderjet, a fighter-bomber aircraft. Overton flew the F-84 during his first tour in Korea.

In February 1952, Overton joined the 8th Fighter-Bomber Squadron, 49th Fighter-Bomber Wing. As many of the other pilots deploying with Overton were from the Air National Guard, Overton was the most experienced jet aircraft pilot among them. Because of this, he was made a flight leader and the assistant Operations Officer of the squadron. The unit flew out of Taegu (K-2) and its missions consisted primarily of close air support and interdiction missions in support of United Nations ground forces. In this time, Overton also took assignments as a forward air controller and directed air support missions to troops on the front lines. Overton spent some of this time on the USS Valley Forge (CV-45) to assist US Navy pilots with their own close air support doctrine.

On 15 June 1952, Overton led a bombing raid over Pyongyang to destroy a series of targets near the Pyongyang Air Base. The targets had been unsuccessfully bombed earlier by a similar strike force, but Overton's group was successful in destroying almost all of the targets while none of his aircraft took major damage from the 48 antiaircraft and 100 automatic weapons, and without harming the many nearby UN prisoner of war concentrations.

On 28 June 1952, the squadron was ordered to attack a convoy of Chinese vehicles. Overton, leading a group of 24 F-84s, directed attacks on the convoy despite taking intense anti-aircraft fire himself, and the aircraft destroyed 150 vehicles. Though the circumstances in the event were lost in subsequent actions, Overton would later be decorated for this achievement.

On 4 July, Overton was on a mission near Sakchu, leading a group of 37 F-84s on an attack mission against the North Korean Military Academy when they were attacked by almost 200 MiG-15s in the largest engagement of the war. In spite of the intense fire, Overton's group took no losses, and the results of the engagement, as well as Overton's heroism were cause for subsequent decoration. With this unit, Overton flew 102 combat missions over the course of a 6-month tour. It concluded in August 1952.

=== Second Korean War tour ===
At the end of his first tour, Overton volunteered for a second tour in Korea in a fighter unit. For this tour, Overton joined the 16th Fighter-Interceptor Squadron, 51st Fighter-Interceptor Wing at Suwon Air Base. For the first several weeks in this assignment, Overton saw little action. He flew 40 missions into MiG alley without making contact with any Soviet, Chinese or North Korean pilots. He flew an F-86 Sabre, tail number 50-631, nicknamed Dolph's Devil and Angel in Disguise.

During this time, Overton was known to sit in his bases' chapel in silence for extended periods of time, not praying, to calm his nerves. He also began to grow a mustache, though he professes not to be superstitious. Overton would continue to grow this mustache until immediately before his final flight, when he shaved it off. He also believed any number with a three in it, including the number 13, was lucky.

Overton was described by fellow pilots as being a "smart and serious professional." He visited a radar site in his spare time to memorize the flight patterns of the Soviet and Chinese fliers. By the end of January 1953, Overton had learned the MiG patrol and landing patterns. He had made contact with MiGs several times but had not been successful at shooting any down. This changed on 21 January when Overton began successfully downing aircraft north of the Yalu River. Over the course of four days and four missions, he downed five Soviet aircraft; two on 21 January and one each on 22 and 23 January. Overton himself expressed surprise at how successful his strategy was, noting he was never discovered until it was too late, and he considered the victories relatively easy. He downed his fifth and final Soviet pilot on 24 January 1953, his 49th mission of the tour. This meant he attained ace status in the shortest time of any pilot in the war. He became an ace on the same day as Harold E. Fischer, and the two were the 24th and 25th US aces in the war. Overton's streak was briefly billed as the "hottest streak in jet fighting history," and for a few days he was characterized as a hero by Stars and Stripes.

During a mission which occurred on a disputed date, either 23 January or 25 January, Overton and his squadron commander, ace Edwin L. Heller flew north of the Yalu River in search of MiG formations. Heller and Overton both shot down aircraft, some sources say this was one of Overton's first five victories, while others say they were his sixth and seventh, for which he never received credit, but Heller was struck by a MiG and crashed. He was either 60 or 150 miles north of the Yalu River line, so a rescue attempt was not made. This was later seen as one of the reasons Overton was singled out for reprimand for crossing the Yalu River. Most sources attribute Overton with only five victories.(Heller became a POW; with Harold Fischer and two other POW Pilots he was repatriated in May 1955).

=== Reprimand and resignation ===
The next morning, 25 January, Overton was summoned to the office of his wing commander, Colonel John W. Mitchell. There, Colonel David C. Jones of the Fifth Air Force command staff determined he had crossed the Yalu river into China for each of his five victories. Violating Chinese airspace was officially prohibited. The next day Mitchell told him he was being grounded and sent home, and "made clear that he was not going home a hero." The 16th Fighter-Interceptor Squadron was grounded for 10 days.

Overton was told he would not be given the decorations he had earned in Korea, including the awards from his previous tour which had not yet been written up. Overton had twice been pinned with a Distinguished Flying Cross personally by Fifth Air Force commander Lieutenant General Glenn O. Barcus, and he had been considered for several Silver Star Medals. Overton was also given a bad efficiency report which characterized him as insubordinate. Overton lost his temporary rank of captain. The military delayed official recognition of his credits and ace status until December 1953. He became one of 40 US aces during the war. Overton resigned his commission before the war ended.

Subsequent analysis has indicated Overton may have been treated unfairly for these actions, becoming a scapegoat for the actions of many other pilots in the war. No new policies had been released warning about crossing the Chinese border, and no pilots before Overton had been punished for doing so. Overton himself expressed frustration at the move, as he had been the rearmost pilot in the formation that crossed the Yalu River on 24 January, and Mitchell himself had been known to cross the border and condoned the action. Fellow ace and unit member Francis Gabreski challenged the move, claiming that US pilots were outnumbered and it was the only way to maintain air superiority. It was later revealed that Swiss observers to the peace talks at Panmunjon were traveling through Manchuria on foot when they spotted a UN-Soviet dogfight and lodged a complaint, prompting an investigation which eventually indicted Overton.

The move was seen as an effort by the US military to prevent an international incident by not acknowledging that US pilots had violated Chinese airspace. Debate remains as to whether or not these airspace violations were a necessity, as US pilots were able to maintain air superiority despite being outnumbered in the war, and Chinese and Soviet pilots, who could have launched similar strikes on UN ships at sea and on targets in Japan did not do so. Still, many missions into Chinese airspace were authorized during the war. Informally, it was known that US pilots regularly violated the rule in a rush to down MiGs.

== Subsequent life ==
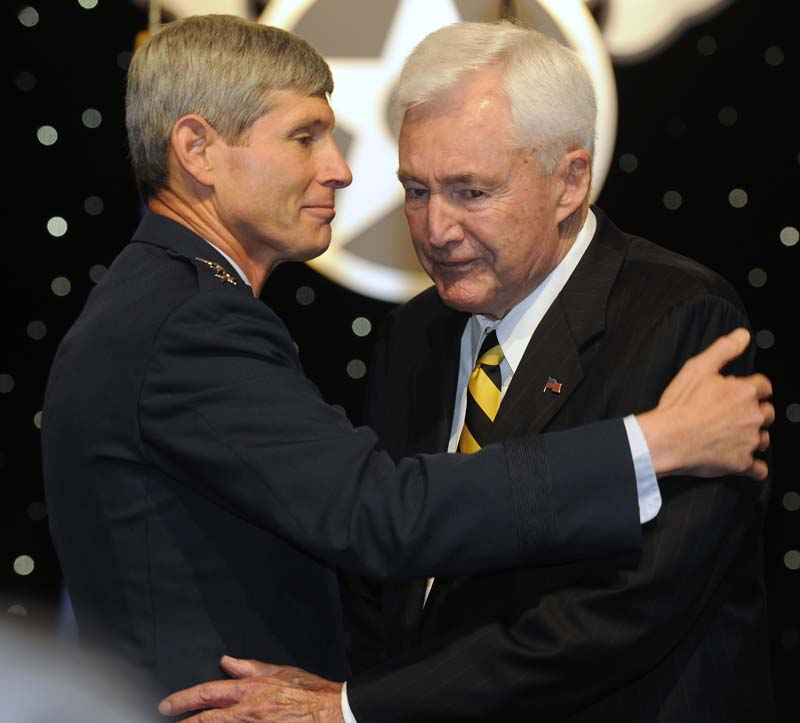
Overton (right) is embraced by Air Force Chief of Staff General Norton Schwartz after being presented with the Distinguished Service Cross in September 2009.

Following his resignation, Overton had no contact with the military. This continued for several decades until Overton reconnected with fellow West Point graduate Lieutenant General Charles G. Cleveland, and he discovered the Air Force had established Air Force Review Boards Agency to review incidents and determine if individuals had been unfairly denied medals. In the meantime, Overton became a successful businessman, owning and operating several companies. In 1979 he reached a deal to buy Liggett & Myers Tobacco from Liggett Group for $122 million but the transaction fell through and the whole company was sold to Grand Metropolitan.

Overton continued flying as a hobby after the military. He built a personal aviation library with 10,000 books, and began collecting and restoring aircraft. By 1999, Overton had acquired and restored over 90 aircraft, donating most to museums and institutions around the United States and abroad. Among this collection are several more Piper Cubs and Ford Trimotor aircraft, which he flew regularly for leisure. He was also active in the development of a state aviation museum for North Carolina. The Carolinas Aviation Museum, established in 1992, named its library for Overton.

Overton was exonerated 25 years later when he was deemed eligible to receive two Distinguished Flying Crosses and four Silver Star Medals. However, records relating to Overton's actions were destroyed in the 1973 National Archives Fire and the awarding of his decorations was delayed. Some sources later whitewashed the controversy by claiming Overton was on his final four missions in Korea when he became an ace, and that he was scheduled to be returned to the United States after the missions anyway. The US Air Force maintained that Overton had been denied his medals due to "clerical omissions." The Air Force, in its citations for Overton's medals, claimed the actions took place at Insadong and Uiju, instead of acknowledging Overton had claimed the victories in Chinese airspace.

Overton was honored by the Gathering of Eagles program of the Air Force Air Command and Staff College twice, once in 1999 and again in 2008. On 18 September 2009, Overton was further presented with the Distinguished Service Cross by Air Force Chief of Staff General Norton Schwartz, who in a speech noted that Overton had been "not properly recognized" for the 28 June 1952 bombing run. Overton would also finally be presented with his Distinguished Flying Cross and Silver Star Medals, 57 years after the actions. It followed a six-month appeal process initiated by Overton.

Overton resided in North Carolina with his wife, Sue. The couple had five children and 10 grandchildren. He died on 25 March 2013.

== Aerial victory credits ==
From numerous visits to radar stations before his flights, Overton memorized where and how the Soviet pilots landed as well as how long they stayed airborne. He then told radar men at Cho-do Airport to inform him when Soviet pilots took off, allowing him to ambush them. Using this information, Overton would fly in a racetrack pattern between the MiGs landing zones and the sun, preventing them from spotting him as they made their landing approaches. Overton would then fall in behind the formations of Soviet fighters as they began their landings, shooting them down with minimal resistance. All of his subsequent victories were described as "parallel intercepts, non-deflection shots from close range without using the radar ranging feature on the Sabre's gunsight."

Most sources agree Overton had five victories. However, there is a dispute as to whether this number is higher, thanks to the disputed account of one mission. A few sources claim Overton flew one final mission on 25 January 1953 and shot down two more MiG-15s which he never received credit for. Other sources attest that this mission—the same in which Edwin Heller was shot down—took place 23 January and Overton shot down only one aircraft during the flight.

Date	#	Type	Location	Aircraft flown	Unit
21 January 1953	2	MiG-15	Manchuria	F-86 Sabre	16 FIS, 51 FW
22 January 1953	1	MiG-15	Manchuria	F-86 Sabre	16 FIS, 51 FW
23 January 1953	1	MiG-15	Manchuria	F-86 Sabre	16 FIS, 51 FW
24 January 1953	1	MiG-15	Manchuria	F-86 Sabre	16 FIS, 51 FW

== Awards and decorations ==
Overton was decorated numerous times during his Korean War tour, however many of these awards and medals were rescinded following his controversial removal from the country. Additionally, his records were among the 16 to 18 million that were destroyed in the 1973 National Archives fire. Most of Overton's decorations were restored following his 2009 appeal. What follows is an incomplete list of awards confirmed to have been awarded to Overton during his service.

USAF Pilot Badge
Distinguished Service Cross		Silver Star w/ 3 bronze oak leaf clusters
Distinguished Flying Cross w/ V device and 3 bronze oak leaf clusters	Distinguished Flying Cross (second ribbon required for accouterment spacing)	Air Medal w/ 1 silver and 3 bronze oak leaf clusters
Air Force Presidential Unit Citation	American Campaign Medal	World War II Victory Medal
National Defense Service Medal	Korean Service Medal w/ 1 silver campaign star	Air Force Longevity Service Award
Republic of Korea Presidential Unit Citation	United Nations Service Medal	Korean War Service Medal

=== Distinguished Service Cross citation ===

The President of the United States of America, authorized by Act of Congress July 9, 1918, takes pleasure in presenting the Distinguished Service Cross to (then) First Lieutenant Dolphin D. Overton, III, United States Air Force, for extraordinary heroism in action against an armed enemy of the United States as Group Leader of twenty-two F-84 type Aircraft, 49th Bomber Wing, FIFTH Air Force, on 28 June 1952. On that date, Lieutenant Overton's group was diverted against a target of truck convoys discovered by a previous recce flight. Working in and through an overcast, Lieutenant Overton planned and executed a very difficult attack, sequencing his aircraft in such a manner as to provide maximum coverage of the target with minimum risk from heavy ground fire. With disregard for his own safety, Lieutenant Overton remained in enemy fire under the overcast so that he could visually direct the attacks and withdrawals. So successful was Lieutenant Overton's direction of the attack, that one hundred fifty trucks were destroyed and confirmed by photograph, making it one of the largest such strikes of the war. Lieutenant Overton's command of this strike in such adverse conditions and with such devastating results highlights his superb flying skill and extraordinary heroism in the face of fierce enemy opposition. Lieutenant Overton's actions reflect great credit upon himself, the FAR EAST Air Force, the United States Air Force, and the United Nations Command.

== See also ==
- List of Korean War air aces
