= Gathering of Eagles Program =

The Gathering of Eagles Program is an annual aviation event that traces its origin back to 1980, when retired Brig. Gen. Paul Tibbets was invited to visit the Air Command and Staff College at Maxwell Air Force Base to share some of his experiences with the students. Tibbetts' visit became the genesis for Gathering of Eagles. The first official Gathering of Eagles, known at the time as, "Great Moments in Aviation History," was held in 1982 when a small faculty and student group was chartered to develop an aviation heritage program. This initial cadre designed a program encouraging the study of aviation history, and the contributions of aviation pioneers. The Gathering of Eagles program at ACSC at Maxwell AFB, Alabama was started by Lt. Col. David L. McFarland in 1982, and he was the principal advisor of this program from 1982 through 2000. Each academic year, students (with rank of major) could apply and be selected to help plan this annual project, under the guidance of Lt. Col. McFarland and other faculty members. Dave McFarland personally traveled all over the world to meet and invite famous aviators to participate and be honored in the program, and his name is referenced in the annual booklet that was published for each gathering.

== Mission ==
The Gathering of Eagles (GOE) is a year-long program that capstones the ACSC curriculum. Each year, people who have made a significant contribution to Airpower receive invitations to a week-long event to share their personal stories of courage, perseverance, and innovation to the ACSC class and local community. GOE has been an annual event since 1982 and has honored over 450 Eagles including Neil Armstrong, Jimmy Doolittle, Bea Haydu, John Glenn, Curtis LeMay, and Chuck Yeager.

== Current Eagles ==
In Academic Year 2019, the Gathering of Eagles team selected 9 legends in Air, Space, and Cyberpower. The lineup for 2019 includes: General (ret) Kevin P. Chilton, Lt Gen (ret) Frank Klotz, Col (ret) Carlyle Smitty Harris, Col (ret) William 'Hawk' Mol, Col (ret) Walter Watson Jr., Col (ret) Merryl Tengesdal, CMSgt Don A. Beasley, SMSgt Thomas Case, and Mr. Abe Karem. From 28-30 May 2019, each of these Eagles are being honored at Air University. On May 29, 3 Eagles will present their story at the Alabama Shakespeare Festival.

== History ==
The first official Gathering of Eagles (then known as "Great Moments in Aviation History") was held in 1982 when a small faculty and student group were selected to develop an aviation heritage program. This initial cadre designed a program encouraging the study of aviation history and the contributions of aviation pioneers. Fifteen distinguished aviators were invited to share their unique personal experiences through a series of teaching interviews and social events with members of the class. They were a diverse group from many nations and services. The first "Eagles" — George Vaughn, Leigh Wade, Jimmy Doolittle, Curtis LeMay, George Gay, Joe Foss, John Mitchell, "Chuck" Yeager, Gail Halvorsen, Paul Tibbets, "Gabby" Gabreski, Robin Olds, Mike Novosel, "Pete" Knight and Neil Armstrong spanned aviation history from World War I to the Space Age. The Eagles who followed included Gregory "Pappy" Boyington, Benjamin O. Davis, Jr., "Robbie" Risner, George Bush, John Glenn, Joe Engle, Jeremiah Denton, "Bud" Day, Dolphin D. Overton III, Ramon Colon-Lopez.
