= John W. Mitchell (United States Air Force) =

US Air Force officer

John William Mitchell
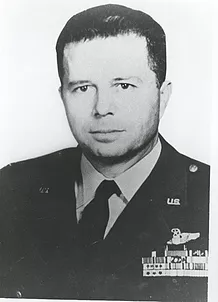
- Born: June 14, 1914; Enid, Mississippi, U.S.
- Died: November 15, 1995 (aged 81); San Anselmo, California, U.S.
- Burial place: Golden Gate National Cemetery
- Military career
- Allegiance: United States
- Branch: United States Army; United States Army Air Corps; United States Army Air Forces; United States Air Force
- Service years: 1934–1958
- Rank: Colonel
- Units: 347th Fighter Group; 15th Fighter Group; 21st Fighter Group; 51st Fighter-Interceptor Wing
- Commands: 339th Fighter Squadron; 21st Fighter Group; Godman Air Force Base; 57th Fighter Group; 51st Fighter-Interceptor Wing; Detroit Air Defense Sector
- Conflicts: World War II; Korean War
- Awards: Distinguished Service Cross; Navy Cross; Legion of Merit; Distinguished Flying Cross (3); Bronze Star Medal; Air Medal (10)

John William Mitchell (June 14, 1914 – November 15, 1995) was an officer of the United States Air Force, a flying ace and the leader of Operation Vengeance, the mission to shoot down Admiral Isoroku Yamamoto. He served in World War II and the Korean War.

== Early life ==
Mitchell was born in Enid, Mississippi to Noah Boothe Mitchell (1881–1967) and Lillian Dickinson Mitchell (1880–1921) on June 14, 1914. Mitchell was a valedictorian of his high school class. He graduated at Columbia University with a degree in Economics on 1934 and continued at the University of Chicago, where he obtained his diploma on 1939.

Mitchell married Anne Lee Miller, during the weeks after the attack on Pearl Harbor.

== Military career ==
Mitchell enlisted in the United States Army on April 9, 1934, and after completing basic training he served with the Coast Artillery Corps at Fort Ruger, Hawaii from July 1934 to September 8, 1938. Mitchell was selected to attend the Aviation Cadet Program, and entered training on November 10, 1939, receiving his commission as a 2nd lieutenant in the United States Army Air Corps and his pilot wings on July 26, 1940.

=== World War II ===
Mitchell flew as a Curtiss P-40 Warhawk pilot with the 55th Fighter Squadron of the 20th Fighter Group from August 1940 to January 1942. He was with the 70th Pursuit Squadron, stranded near Charlotte, North Carolina during the attack on Pearl Harbor, due to a malfunctioning P-40.

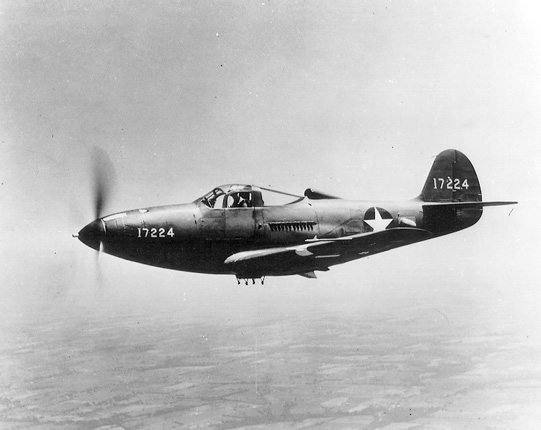
P-39 Airacobra

After re-organizing, and training new recruits as well as possible, Mitchell and the members of the 70th Fighter Squadron embarked for Fiji on Jan. 20, 1942. They were given the new aircraft, the Bell P-39 Airacobra. Landing at the harbor of Suva, the men of the 70th FS began to struggle with their P-39s in the tropical downpours and mud of Fiji. On October 5, Mitchell and eight of his pilots were detached from the 70th FS for duty on Guadalcanal with the 339th Fighter Squadron of 347th Fighter Group.

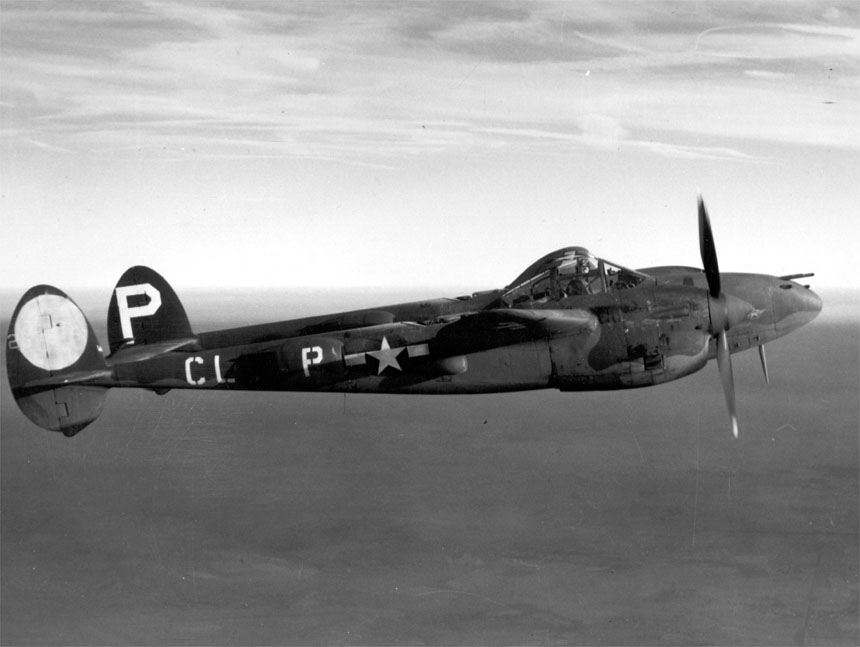
P-38 Lightning

Flying the P-39 Airacobra, Mitchell had shot down three Japanese planes by early November. Later that month, he was promoted to major and commanding officer of the 339th Fighter Squadron. The arrival of the first P-38 Lightnings overshadowed his promotion. The 339th FG became the first squadron in the South Pacific to operate the twin engine fighter and began flying combat missions, which began inflicting even higher losses on the Japanese. While flying the P-38 Lightning, Mitchell shot down five Japanese planes, making him a flying ace.

==== Operation Vengeance ====
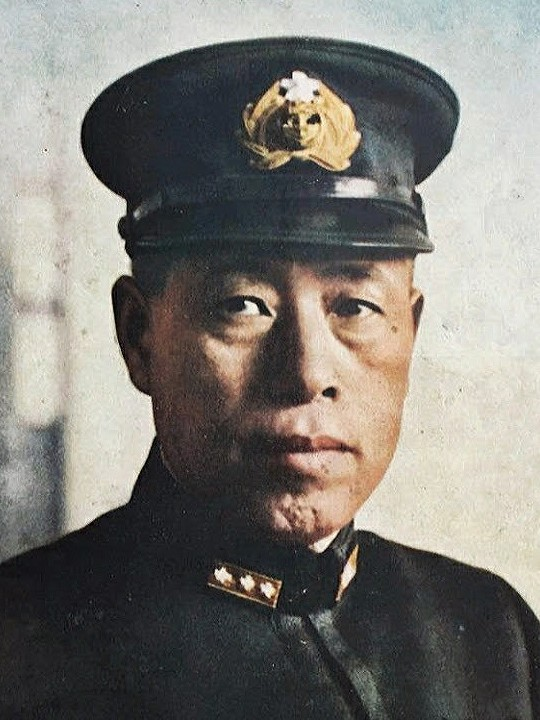
Admiral Isoroku Yamamoto

Back in Hawaii, on April 14, the American code-breakers intercepted the message detailing Japanese Admiral Isoroku Yamamoto's itinerary. The decoded and translated message made its way to Washington DC, back to Admiral Nimitz in Hawaii, then to Admiral Halsey on New Caledonia, and to Admiral Mitscher on Guadalcanal. All levels approved the shoot-down mission, and Mitscher assigned it to Mitchell, who plotted a roundabout approach, far from other islands, to minimize the chance that observers would warn the enemy of the attack.

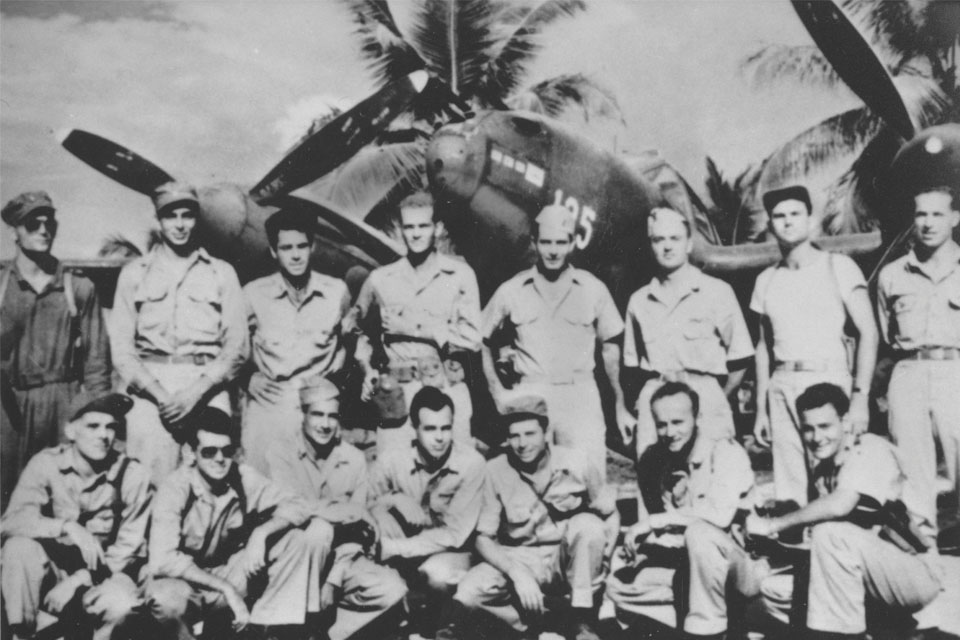
Members of the 339th Fighter Squadron; Mitchell is fifth from the left, in the front row.

Overnight at Henderson Field, ground crews fitted large new fuel tanks under the wings of the P-38Gs. By dawn on April 18, 18 aircraft were ready. Mitchell's last instructions before the 07:00 take-off were to maintain radio silence. The flight proceeded northwest at wave-top level to avoid Japanese spotters, sweeping widely away from New Georgia. Mitchell tried to hold the planes at thirty feet; with only the ocean below, depth perception was almost non-existent. By 08:00, the P-38s were 285 miles from the planned interception. At that minute, Admiral Yamamoto's G4M Betty bomber took off from Rabaul, on time for his scheduled 10:00 arrival at Bougainville. His entourage, including his chief of staff, Admiral Matome Ugaki, was aboard two other G4M Betty bombers, and the bomber flight was escorted by six A6M Zeros.

At 08:20, the P-38s changed their heading for the first time, swinging slightly to the north. Half an hour later, when abreast of Vella Lavella, they made their second planned course change, again shifting a little more to the north. At 09:00, Mitchell made their last change, heading northeast, directly toward the coast of Bougainville, only 40 miles away. He also began the slow climb for altitude at this point. At 09:34 Doug Canning called out "Bogeys, eleven o'clock high." The P-38 pilots jettisoned their drop tanks and attacked. Holmes and Hine had trouble with their tanks; Lanphier, at least initially, headed for the escort flight, while Barber engaged the Japanese bombers. All the other P-38Gs followed their instructions to fly cover against the Zero fighters.

Both Thomas G. Lanphier and Rex Barber claimed one bomber shot down over the jungles of Bougainville. Besby Holmes claimed another shot down over the water a few minutes later. From Japanese records and survivors, among them Admiral Ugaki, the following facts are certain: only two G4M Betty bombers were attacked; Yamamoto's was shot down over Bougainville with no survivors; the second went into the ocean and Admiral Ugaki was among the three survivors. The day following the attack, a Japanese search party located the wreckage, including Yamamoto's body, which they ceremonially cremated.

==== Post mission ====
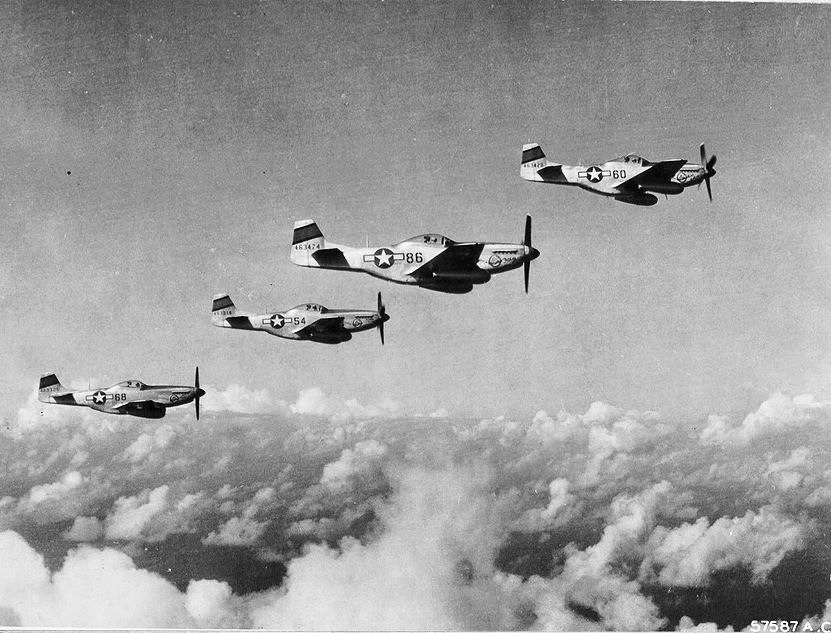
P-51D Mustangs from the 15th Fighter Group flying an escort mission

After the mission, Mitchell served a tour with Headquarters Army Air Forces from June to December 1943. His total score in Guadalcanal was eight enemy planes destroyed. Then he was assigned to the 412th Fighter Group, where he served from December 1943 to April 1945. Mitchell flew Supermarine Spitfires and Hawker Hurricanes as an observer in England in April and May 1945.

He next served the 15th Fighter Group based in Iwo Jima from May to June 1945. He flew North American P-51 Mustangs in very long-range (VLR) missions over Japan and shot down one enemy aircraft. He subsequently served as deputy commander and then commander of the 21st Fighter Group, where he served from July to October 1945. While serving with the 21st FG, he was credited with two more enemy planes destroyed in VLR missions over Japan.

Mitchell was credited with destroying a total of 11 enemy aircraft in aerial combat during World War II.

=== Post war ===
After United States Army Air Forces became United States Air Force, Mitchell was assigned as director of training and operations at Keesler Field, Mississippi, from February 1946 to August 1947. He attended Air Command and Staff College at Maxwell Air Force Base, Alabama from August 1947 to June 1948, and then served as base commander at Godman Air Force Base, Kentucky, from June 1948 to July 1949. Mitchell served with the 63d Fighter Wing at Brooks Air Force Base, Texas, from July 1949 to November 1950, and then served as commander of the 57th Fighter Interceptor Group at Eielson Air Force Base, Alaska, from November 1950 to June 1952.

=== Korean War ===
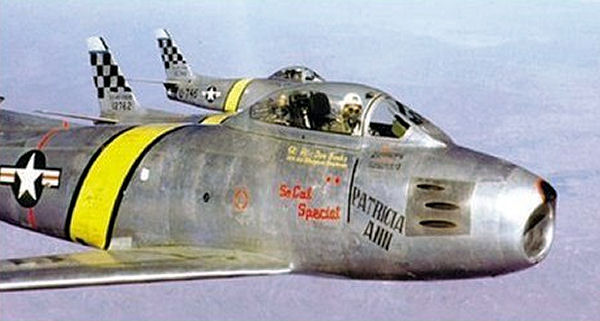
F-86s of the 51st FIW over Korea

Mitchell served again during the Korean War, assuming command of the 51st Fighter-Interceptor Wing from Colonel Gabby Gabreski in June 1952. Stationed at Suwon Air Base in South Korea, he flew 110 missions in the North American F-86 Sabre and shot down four MiG-15 aircraft. As the commanding officer of the 51st FIW, Mitchell faced the additional challenge of addressing the "flight suit" mentality prevalent among his pilots—a culture characterized by a strong sense of self-confidence and pride, bordering on arrogance, where status was determined by flying ability rather than academic qualifications, rank, or traditional officer skills. This issue came to a critical point when Lt. Col. Edwin L. Heller, commander of the 16th Fighter-Interceptor Squadron, was shot down on the Chinese side of the Yalu River. As Robert F. Dorr describes it in his book Korean War Aces:

"Mitchell was madder than any colonel the pilot had ever seen"

Mitchell and Lt Gen. Glenn O. Barcus, the commanding general of Fifth Air Force, made a lot of personnel changes and even attempted to strip one pilot, Capt. Dolphin Overton, of his flying ace status.

=== Post war ===
After serving in Korea, Mitchell served with the 28th Air Division at Hickam Air Force Base, Hawaii from June 1953 to July 1956. Mitchell's final assignment was as commander of the Detroit Air Defense Sector at Custer Air Force Station, Michigan from July 1957 until his retirement from the Air Force on July 31, 1958.

Mitchell flew 240 combat missions in World War II and Korean War, and was credited with 15 aerial victories together in the two wars.

== Later life ==
Mitchell died on November 15, 1995, at the age of 81. He was buried at the Golden Gate National Cemetery on November 30.

== Aerial victory credits ==
Chronicle of aerial victories
Date	#	Type	Location	Aircraft flown	Unit Assigned
October 9, 1942	1	Mitsubishi F1M	Henderson Field, Solomon Islands	P-39 Airacobra	339 FS, 347 FG
October 23, 1942	1	Mitsubishi A6M Zero	Tulagi, Solomon Islands	P-39 Airacobra	339 FS, 347 FG
November 7, 1942	1	Nakajima A6M2-N	Santa Isabel Island, Solomon Islands	P-39 Airacobra	339 FS, 347 FG
January 5, 1943	1	Nakajima A6M2-N	Bougainville Island, Solomon Islands	P-38 Lightning	339 FS, 347 FG
January 27, 1943	2	A6M Zero	Cape Esperance, Solomon Islands	P-38 Lightning	339 FS, 347 FG
January 29, 1943	1	Nakajima Ki-27	Guadalcanal, Solomon Islands	P-38 Lightning	339 FS, 347 FG
February 2, 1943	1	Nakajima A6M2-N	Shortland Islands, Solomon Islands	P-38 Lightning	339 FS, 347 FG
June 26, 1945	1	A6M Zero	Kiso, Japan	P-51 Mustang	15 FG Hq
July 16, 1945	2	Kawanishi N1K	Tsu, Japan	P-51 Mustang	21 FG Hq
January 21, 1953	1	MiG-15	North Korea	F-86 Sabre	51 FW Hq
March 9, 1953	1	MiG-15	North Korea	F-86 Sabre	51 FW Hq
April 11, 1953	1	MiG-15	Uiju County, North Korea	F-86 Sabre	51 FW Hq
May 15, 1953	1	MiG-15	North Korea	F-86 Sabre	51 FW Hq

SOURCES: Air Force Historical Study 85: USAF Credits for the Destruction of Enemy Aircraft, World War II and Air Force Historical Study 81: USAF Credits for the Destruction of Enemy Aircraft, Korean War, Freeman 1993

== Awards and decorations ==
Mitchell's decorations include:

USAF Command Pilot
Distinguished Service Cross
Navy Cross	Legion of Merit	Distinguished Flying Cross with 2 bronze oak leaf clusters
Bronze Star	Air Medal with 1 silver and 3 bronze oak leaf clusters	Air Medal (second ribbon required for accouterment spacing)
Army Commendation Medal	Air Force Presidential Unit Citation	Navy Presidential Unit Citation with 1 service star
American Defense Service Medal	American Campaign Medal	Asiatic-Pacific Campaign Medal with 4 bronze campaign stars
World War II Victory Medal	Army of Occupation Medal with 'Japan' clasp	National Defense Service Medal
Korean Service Medal with 3 bronze campaign stars	Air Force Longevity Service Award with 1 silver oak leaf cluster	Armed Forces Reserve Medal
Republic of Korea Presidential Unit Citation	United Nations Korea Medal	Republic of Korea War Service Medal

=== Distinguished Service Cross ===

Mitchell, John W.
Major (then Captain), U.S Army Air Forces
339th Fighter Squadron, 347th Fighter Group, 13th Air Force
Date of Action: October 4, 1942 – November 10, 1942 & December 22, 1942 – February 4, 1943
Headquarters, U.S. Army Forces in the South Pacific Area: General Orders No. 56 (March 9, 1943)

Citation:

"The President of the United States of America, authorized by Act of Congress, July 9, 1918, takes pleasure in presenting the Distinguished Service Cross to Major (Air Corps), {then Captain} John W. Mitchell, United States Army Air Forces, for extraordinary heroism in air actions against the enemy while serving as a Pilot with the 67th Fighter Squadron and later as Commander of the 339th Fighter Squadron, 347th Fighter Group, 13th Air Force, during the periods 4 October 1942 to 10 November 1942 and from 22 December 1942 to 4 February 1943. On 4 October, Major Mitchell led a flight of eleven P-39 airplanes to Guadalcanal, arriving there on 7 October. On 9 October, he led a flight of P-39 airplanes on two escort missions for SBD airplanes against an enemy naval force 150 miles off Guadalcanal; part of the second mission being accomplished after dark and being extremely hazardous due to the very low ceiling and no landing lights. He destroyed one enemy float bi-plane; others of the flight probably destroyed two others, all returning safely to base. On 23 October, he shot down one enemy Zero while leading a flight of P-39 airplanes on patrol over Guadalcanal, and returning and landing safely after dark in heavy rain. On 7 November, he led a flight of eight P-39's loaded with 500-pound bombs on a dive-bombing mission against an enemy naval force of one cruiser and fourteen destroyers. Intercepted by five enemy float "Zeroes" he destroyed one, and the flight shot down the balance, all returning safely. On 5 January, while with six P-38 airplanes on an escort mission for five B-17 bombers, some twenty-five enemy planes attacked. Outnumbered four-to-one, the fighters destroyed three of the enemy and probable three others, Major Mitchell accounting for one float Zero. On 27 January, he led a flight of six P-38's against a superior force of about thirty "Zeroes" over Guadalcanal and destroyed two of them himself. On 29 January, he took off alone from Henderson Field, Guadalcanal, before daylight in a P-38 to intercept enemy bombers that had been harassing the troops by bombing each night and shot down an enemy type 97 medium bomber making a low-level bombing and strafing run on the field. On 2 February, he led a flight of four P-38's as a bomber escort and shot down one float "Zero" of the three enemy planes accounted for by the flight. Major Mitchell has destroyed more than five enemy airplanes, having shot down a total of eight confirmed, destroyed an undetermined number on the ground and water during strafing strikes at Rekata Bay and Munda Point, and led numerous other missions in addition to those specifically mentioned, in over 150 hours of combat flying time as Flight Commander."

=== Navy Cross ===

Mitchell, John W.
Captain, U.S Army Air Forces
339th Fighter Squadron, 347th Fighter Group, 13th Air Force (Detached)
Date of Action: April 18, 1943

Citation:

"The President of the United States of America takes pleasure in presenting the Navy Cross to Major (Air Corps) John W. Mitchell, United States Army Air Forces, for extraordinary heroism while serving with the 339th Fighter Squadron, 347th Fighter Group, 13th Air Force, attached to a Marine Fighter Command in action against enemy Japanese forces in the Solomon Islands on 18 April 1943. Leading a flight of sixteen fighter planes at dangerously low altitude in the longest planned interception mission ever attempted, Major Mitchell contacted the assigned objective, consisting of two enemy bombers and six escort fighters, with complete tactical surprise and launched a fierce, determined attack. In the ensuing engagement he directed the operations of his group with such outstanding professional skill and daring courage that they shot down both bombers in flames, three of the hostile escort aircraft and another bomber, not in company, which was sighted approaching the nearby enemy base at Kahili. With full appreciation of the technical accuracy required for the achievement of this vital mission, Major Mitchell completed the difficult assignment with remarkable success. His brilliant leadership and valiant devotion to duty under extremely adverse conditions contributed greatly to the efforts of our forces in the Solomon Islands and were in keeping with the highest traditions of the United States Armed Services."

== Bibliography ==
- Lehr, Dick (2020). The Story of How Johnny Mitchell and His Fighter Pilots Took on Admiral Yamamoto and Avenged Pearl Harbor (Ebook). HarperCollins. ISBN 9780062448521.
- Glines, Carroll V. (1990). Attack on Yamamoto (Hardcover). Orion Books. ISBN 9780517577288.
- Molesworth, Carl (2012). Very Long Range P-51 Mustang Units of the Pacific War (Hardcover). Bloomsbury Publishing. ISBN 9781782005810.
