= Daniel T. Scannell =

American policeman, attorney, and business executive

Daniel Thomas Scannell
- Born: November 17, 1912; Bronx, New York
- Died: February 19, 2000 (aged 87); Queens, New York
- Education: Fordham University; Fordham University School of Law
- Spouse: Gertrude Rose (née Lally)

Daniel Thomas Scannell Jr. (November 17, 1912 - February 19, 2000) was a policeman, attorney, and business executive who held numerous positions in the Metropolitan Transportation Authority in New York State over a 45-year tenure.

== Early life ==
Scannell was born in the Bronx, New York, to Daniel T. (d. 1939) and Eleanor (née Walsh) Scannell. He attended Fordham University, earning an undergraduate degree in accounting in 1935, and earned a law degree from Fordham University School of Law in 1940.

Preceded by Gabby Gabreski	President of Long Island Rail Road (interim); 1981	Succeeded by Robin H.H. Wilson
