= Han Decai =

Chinese general (1933 – 2024)

- 韩德彩
- Han in 2020

Deputy Commander of the Nanjing Military Region Air Force
- In office May 1983 – June 1995
- Commander: Jiang Yutian; Sun Jinghua; Xie Decai

Personal details
- Born: June 1933 Fengyang County, Anhui, China
- Died: 1 April 2024 (aged 90) Shanghai, China
- Party: Chinese Communist Party
- Spouse: Zhu Rongfen
- Education: PLA Air Force Aviation School

Military service
- Allegiance: People's Republic of China
- Branch/service: People's Liberation Army Air Force
- Years of service: 1949–1995
- Rank: Lieutenant general
- Unit: 43rd Regiment of the 15th Division of the PLA Air Force
- Commands: Nanjing Military Region Air Force
- Battles/wars: Korean War
- Awards: Order of the National Flag (1st class); Order of Freedom and Independence (2nd class)

Chinese name
- Simplified Chinese: 韩德彩
- Traditional Chinese: 韓德彩
Transcriptions
Standard Mandarin
- Hanyu Pinyin: Hán Décái

Han Decai (Chinese: 韩德彩; June 1933 – 1 April 2024) was a lieutenant general in the People's Liberation Army Air Force of China. He was a MiG-15 pilot and made six claims against American Aircraft, including Harold Fischer, during the Korean War.

== Biography ==
Han was born into a peasant family in Fengyang County, Anhui, in June 1933. He enlisted in the People's Liberation Army (PLA) in March 1949, and joined the Chinese Communist Party (CCP) in March 1953. He graduated from the PLA Air Force Aviation School in 1951.

In 1952, he served as a pilot and squadron leader of the 43rd Regiment of the 15th Division of the PLA Air Force during the Korean War.
His "kill Credits":

- 24 March 1952 49-1140/F86A/4th Ftr-Int Gp/334th Ftr-Int Sq 4/ 4 F-86s attacked 3 Mig-15s, jumped by 2 more MiGs/ Acct disappeared/Crew members associated with loss: Carey, James D. 1st Lt USAF MIA
- 24 March 1952 49-1088/F-86A/4th Ftr-Int Gp/335th Ftr-Int Sq. Damaged during encounter with MiGs. Landed at K-14
- 26 March 1952 51-12936/F86/4th Ftr-int Gp/335th Ftr-Int Sq/ Major damage by 37mm projectile from MiG-15, landed at Home base
- 25 January 1953 51-2796/F86E/336th Sq/4th Fighter Interception Wing Lt Bill Stauffer KIA
- 7 April 1953, he shot down the famous American fighter pilot Harold Fischer in Chinese airspace north of the Yalu River. In October 1997, he met Fischer, when he joined a group of Flying Tiger pilots who had been invited to visit China. Fischer presented him with an F-86 model and they became friends.
- 19 June 1953 # 52-4367/F-86F/8th Ftr-Bmbr Gp/36th Ftr-Bmbr Sq/Disappeared while on strafing run, probably hit by gnd fire, crash not observed.Crewmembers associated with loss:Escalle, Jimmy L. 2Lt. USAF MIA

Total Aircraft Shot down 4 damaged 2 Crew MIA 2 Crew KIA 1 Crew POW 1 He once served as commander of the 4th Army of the People's Liberation Army Air Force. In May 1983, he was promoted to deputy commander of the Nanjing Military Region Air Force, and served until June 1995.

He attained the rank of lieutenant general (zhongjiang) in 1991.

He died in Shanghai on 1 April 2024, at the age of 90.

== Family ==
In 1957, Han married Zhu Rongfen, a medical doctor and a Chinese air force colonel, in Wuxi, Jiangsu.

== Awards ==
- Order of the National Flag (1st class)
- Order of Freedom and Independence (2nd class)
