= Edwin L. Heller =

Lieutenant Colonel in the United States Air Force

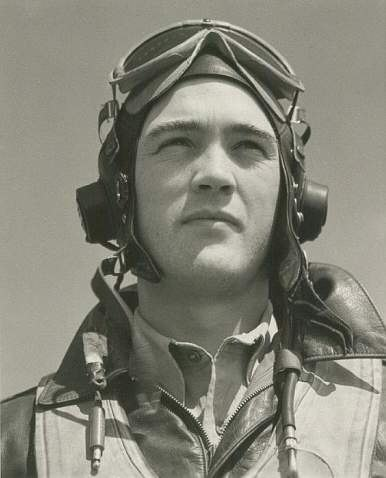
- Born: December 5, 1918; Philadelphia, Pennsylvania, U.S.
- Died: May 17, 2004 (aged 85); Grass Valley, California, U.S.
- Burial place: Arlington National Cemetery
- Military career
- Allegiance: United States of America
- Branch: United States Army Air Forces; United States Air Force
- Service years: 1942–1967
- Rank: Lieutenant Colonel
- Nickname: "Ed"
- Units: 352nd Fighter Group; 51st Fighter-Interceptor Wing
- Commands: 16th Fighter-Interceptor Squadron
- Conflicts: World War II; Korean War; Cuban Missile Crisis
- Awards: Distinguished Service Cross; Silver Star; Distinguished Flying Cross (6); Purple Heart; Air Medal (15)

Edwin Lewis Heller (December 5, 1918 - May 17, 2004) was a United States Air Force lieutenant colonel and a flying ace, who was credited in destroying 5.5 enemy aircraft in aerial combat and 14 enemy aircraft on the ground during World War II. He also served in the Korean War, where he was credited in destroying 3.5 enemy aircraft before he was subsequently shot down and taken prisoner.

== Early life ==
Heller was born on December 5, 1918, in Philadelphia, Pennsylvania.

== Military career ==
On March 16, 1942, Heller enlisted in the Aviation Cadet Program. He completed his preflight training at Maxwell and Craig Fields in Alabama, before proceeding with primary training at Dorr Field in Florida. After completing his advanced training at Spence Field in Georgia and gunnery training at Eglin Field in Florida, he was commissioned in the United States Army Air Forces and awarded his pilot wings on February 16, 1943.

=== World War II ===
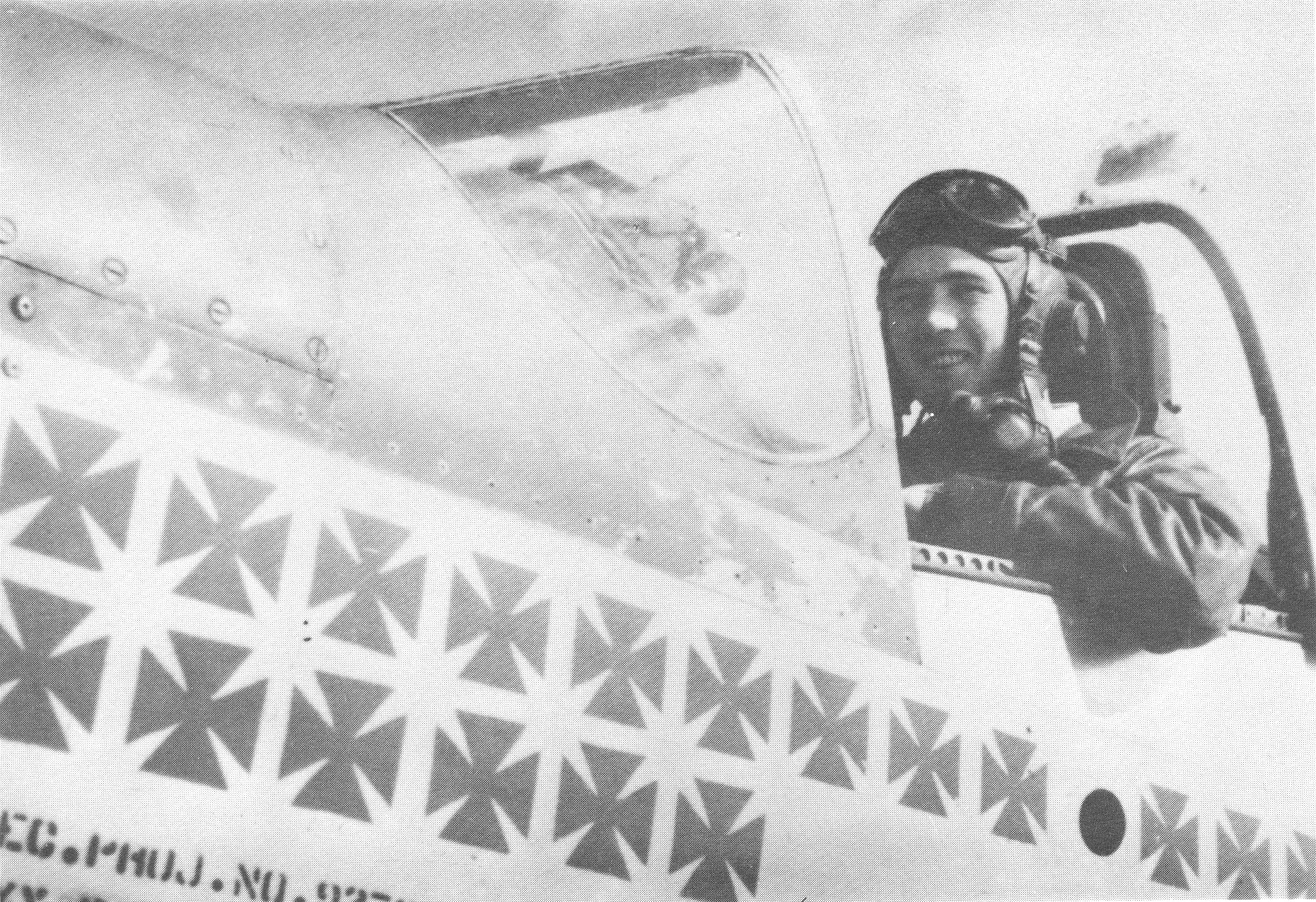
Heller onboard his P-51 Mustang

He was then assigned to the 486th Fighter Squadron of the 352nd Fighter Group. The 352nd FG boarded the troopship RMS Queen Elizabeth in June 1943. The group landed in the United Kingdom in July, and was assigned to RAF Bodney in Watton, Norfolk, under the operational control of the 67th Fighter Wing, VIII Fighter Command.

Initially flying the P-47 Thunderbolts, the squadron began to replace its Thunderbolts with longer range North American P-51 Mustangs in April 1944. On April 24, Heller and his flight leader attacked a heavily defended field, with Heller credited in destroying three enemy aircraft in first attack. After his flight leader was shot down, Heller attacked two more airfields during his solo return to England, destroying four and damaging five more aircraft. For his heroism in the mission, he was awarded the Distinguished Service Cross.

On May 8, 1944, during an escort mission over Germany, Heller shot down a Messerschmitt Bf 109 that was attacking his flight leader. He then damaged another Bf 109 that flew towards the ground. Heller continued the chase the Bf 109 around steeples, buildings, trees and haystacks. As the German pilot began running out of obstacles, he made a tight left turn, and both the German pilot and Heller ended up in a Lufbery circle. In desperation, the German pilot broke out of the circle and Heller managed to shoot him down. In the aftermath of the shootdown, Heller' P-51's coolant blew up, covering his windscreen. But he managed to fly back to RAF Bodney after a two-hour flight. He was credited with his first two aerial victories. On May 28, he destroyed another Bf 109 over Magdeburg, his third aerial victory.

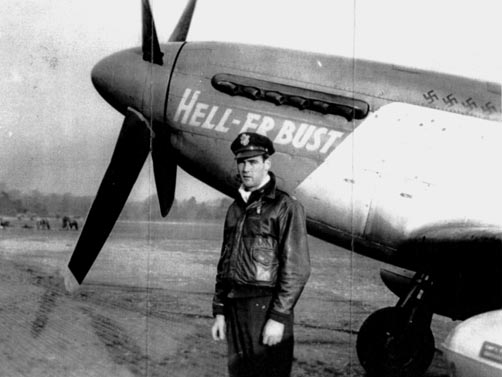
Heller with his P-51 Mustang at an airfield in Belgium

From June 1944, the 352nd FG took part in shuttle bombing missions as part of Operation Frantic. In one such mission on June 21, 1944, Heller shot down a Bf 109 over Brest-Litovsk, crediting him with the record for aerial victory furthest from home base by a fighter aircraft (1000 miles). He completed his first tour of combat and took shore leave.

Heller returned to his unit in the autumn of 1944 and became a flying ace on March 2, 1945, when he shot down a Focke-Wulf Fw 190 over Leipzig, his fifth aerial victory. On April 16, 1945, he led his flight in attacking a German aerodrome. Despite the anti-aircraft fire, Heller made several sweeps on the airfield, and destroyed two gun emplacements and seven aircraft. For his actions, he was awarded the Silver Star.

During World War II, Heller flew 145 combat missions and was credited with the destruction of 5.5 enemy aircraft in aerial combat plus 14 aircraft destroyed on the ground while strafing enemy airfields. While serving with the 352nd FG, he flew P-47 and P-51s bearing the names "Happy" and "HELL-ER BUST".

=== Korean War ===
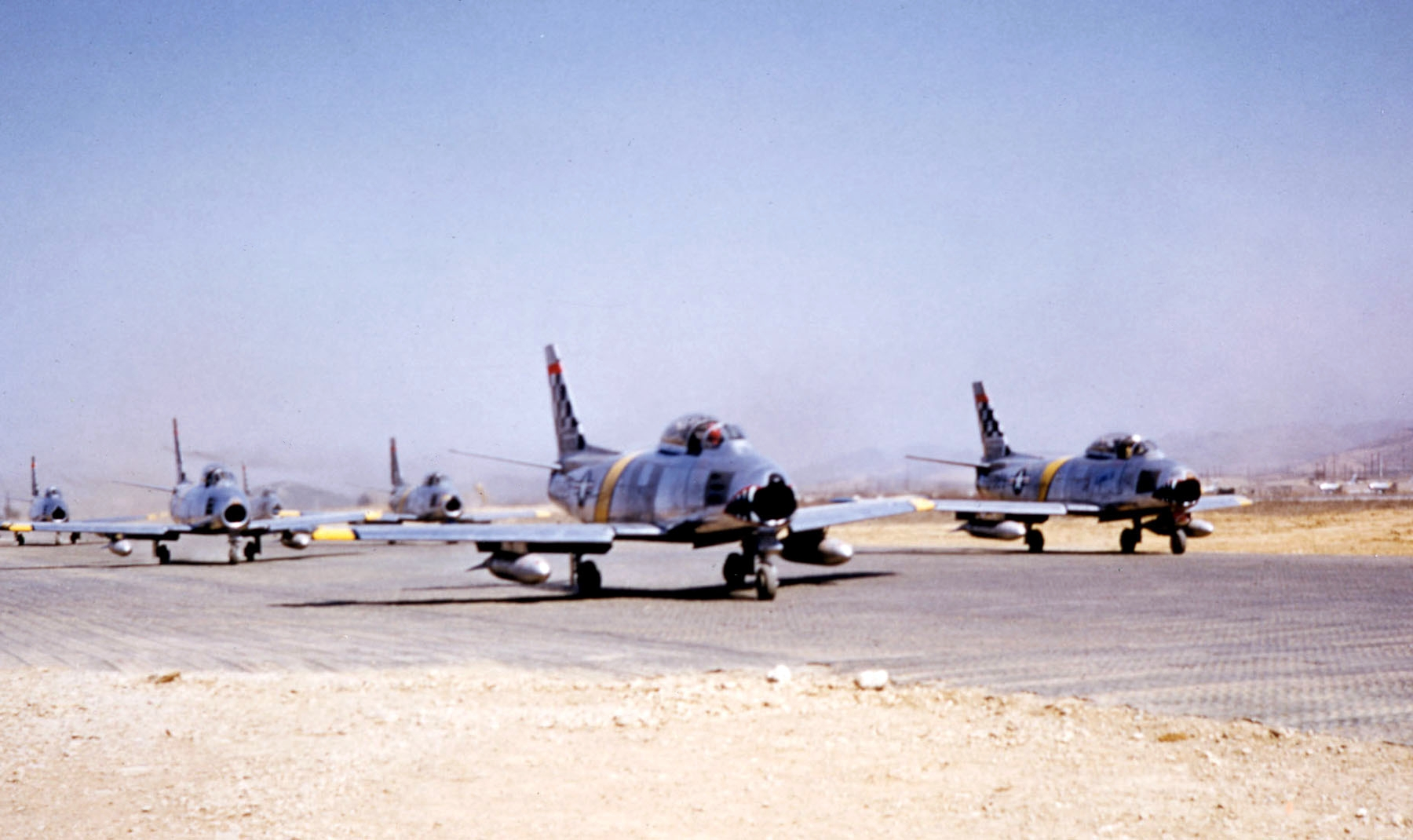
51st FIW F-86 Sabres in Korea

During the Korean War, Heller was assigned as commander of the 16th Fighter-Interceptor Squadron in the 51st Fighter-Interceptor Wing in 1952. Stationed at Suwon Air Base in South Korea, Heller flew the North American F-86 Sabres and shot down his first MiG-15 on November 17, 1952.

During his 59th mission which occurred on January 23, 1953, Heller and his squadron pilot, Dolphin D. Overton flew north of the Yalu River in search of MiG formations. Heller and Overton both shot down aircraft, with Heller credited with destroying two more MiG-15s. Heller was then struck by a MiG and ejected out of his crippled F-86. Due to the winds at the border between China and North Korea, he landed at a village in Northeast China. Upon landing, his left leg suffered a compound fracture and he was apprehended by a villager armed with a bolo knife. After the villager found out that Heller was not armed, he and other villagers loaded him into a truck and handed him to the authorities who placed him into a prison and informed him that he would never be released unless he signed a confession that the border crossing into China was on orders from his commanders.

During his time in prison, he was not tortured physically, but spent his imprisonment in solitary confinement, where he remained in rudimentary and painful conditions for more than two years. Eventually, he underwent a third operation that gave him the use of his left leg. After a short mock trial in Beijing on May 24, 1955, Heller and the other pilots 1st Lt. Harold E. Fischer, 1st Lt. Lyle W. Cameron and 1st Lt. Roland W. Parks — were found guilty of violating Chinese territory by flying across the border while on missions over North Korea. On 31 May, the pilots were released and deported to Hong Kong, where they were repatriated back to the United States.

=== Post war ===
After repatriation, Heller returned to flying status and served in various fighter units within the Air Defense Command, Air Training Command, Tactical Air Command and United States Air Forces in Europe. During the Cuban Missile Crisis, he maintained alert status as an F-100 Super Sabre pilot at Homestead Air Force Base in Florida. He retired from the Air Force on April 1, 1967, at the rank of lieutenant colonel.

Heller flew 208 combat missions in World War II and Korean War, and was credited with 9 aerial victories together in the two wars.

== Later life ==
Heller and his wife Johanna had a son and daughter, and several grand and great-grandchildren. After his retirement from the Air Force, Heller and his family resided in Grass Valley, California.

He died on May 17, 2004, and was buried at Arlington National Cemetery on July 14.

== Aerial victory credits ==
Date	#	Type	Location	Aircraft flown	Unit Assigned
May 8, 1944	2	Messerschmitt Bf 109	Gifhorn, Germany	P-51 Mustang	486 FS, 352 FG
May 28, 1944	0.5	Bf 109	Magdeburg, Germany	P-51	486 FS, 352 FG
May 28, 1944	1	Bf 109	Dessau, Germany	P-51	486 FS, 352 FG
June 21, 1944	1	Bf 109	Brest-Litovsk, Reichskommissariat Ukraine	P-51	486 FS, 352 FG
March 2, 1945	1	Focke-Wulf Fw 190	Leipzig, Germany	P-51	486 FS, 352 FG
November 17, 1952	1	Mikoyan-Gurevich MiG-15	North Korea	F-86E Sabre	16 FIS, 51 FIW
November 17, 1952	0.5	MiG-15	North Korea	F-86E	16 FIS, 51 FIW
January 23, 1953	2	MiG-15	Northeast China	F-86E	16 FIS, 51 FIW

SOURCES: Air Force Historical Study 85: USAF Credits for the Destruction of Enemy Aircraft, World War II and Air Force Historical Study 81: USAF Credits for the Destruction of Enemy Aircraft, Korean War, Freeman, The Mighty Eighth

== Awards and decorations ==
His awards include:

USAF Command pilot badge
Distinguished Service Cross
Silver Star
Distinguished Flying Cross with silver oak leaf cluster
Purple Heart
Air Medal with two silver and two bronze oak leaf clusters
Air Medal with bronze oak leaf cluster (second ribbon required for accoutrement spacing)
Air Force Presidential Unit Citation with two bronze oak leaf clusters
Prisoner of War Medal
American Campaign Medal
European-African-Middle Eastern Campaign Medal with four bronze campaign stars
World War II Victory Medal
National Defense Service Medal with service star
Korean Service Medal with three bronze campaign stars
Armed Forces Expeditionary Medal
Air Force Longevity Service Award with silver oak leaf cluster
Small Arms Expert Marksmanship Ribbon
Croix de Guerre with silver star (France)
Republic of Korea Presidential Unit Citation
United Nations Service Medal for Korea
Korean War Service Medal

=== Distinguished Service Cross citation ===

Heller, Edwin L.
First Lieutenant, U.S. Army Air Forces
486th Fighter Squadron, 352nd Fighter Group, 8th Air Force
Date of Action: April 24, 1944

Citation:

The President of the United States of America, authorized by Act of Congress, July 9, 1918, takes pleasure in presenting the Distinguished Service Cross to First Lieutenant (Air Corps) Edwin Lewis Heller, United States Army Air Forces, for extraordinary heroism in connection with military operations against an armed enemy while serving as Pilot of a Fighter Airplane in the 486th Fighter Squadron, 352d Fighter Group, Eighth Air Force, in aerial combat against enemy forces on 24 April 1944, during an air mission over Germany. On that date, Lieutenant Heller with his flight leader attacked a strongly defended enemy airdrome and Lieutenant Heller destroyed three enemy aircraft. In the attack the flight leader was lost. Lieutenant Heller then set course for home alone. Spotting another airdrome with many planes parked in the dispersal area, and with complete disregard for the intense anti-aircraft fire and the hazards of low level attack, Lieutenant Heller coolly selected a target, attacked and destroyed two airplanes. He again set course for home and soon found another air field loaded with airplanes. Although his fuel and ammunition supply was low and he was deep in enemy territory, he fearlessly flew into an intense barrage of ground fire and with his remaining ammunition sprayed buildings, aircraft, and enemy personnel. In this attack he destroyed two airplanes and damaged others. During all these attacks, Lieutenant Heller destroyed seven enemy airplanes, damaged five others, and inflicted damage on buildings and other installations. The courage, skill, and determination to destroy the enemy displayed by Lieutenant Heller reflect highest credit upon himself and the Armed Forces of the United States.
