= Harold Fischer =

American fighter pilot

Harold Edward Fischer
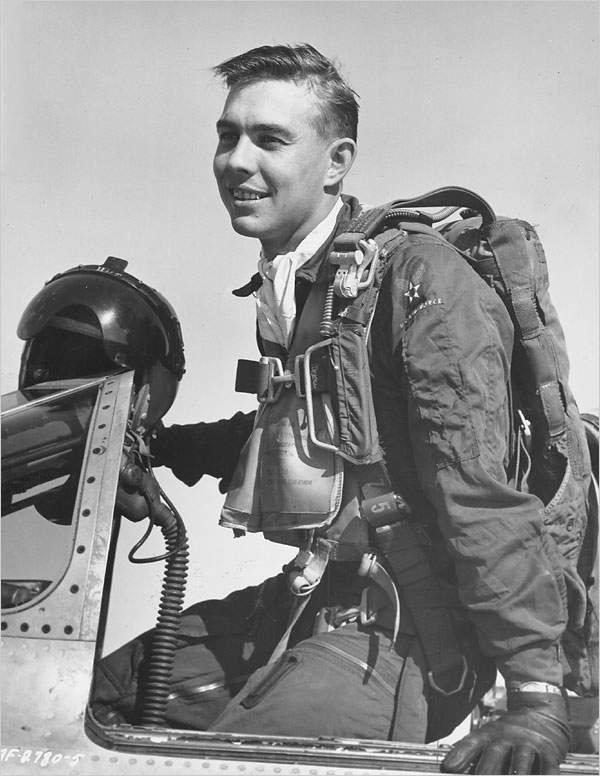
- Harold Fischer in Korea
- Born: May 8, 1925; Lone Rock, Iowa, U.S.
- Died: April 30, 2009 (aged 83); Las Vegas, Nevada, U.S.
- Burial place: Arlington National Cemetery
- Military career
- Allegiance: United States
- Branch: United States Navy; United States Army; United States Air Force
- Service years: 1943–1944 (USN); 1949 (USA); 1949–1978 (USAF)
- Rank: Colonel
- Nickname: Hal
- Units: 80th Fighter Bomber Squadron; 39th Fighter Interceptor Squadron
- Commands: Air Force Human Resources Laboratory
- Conflicts: World War II; Korean War; Vietnam War
- Awards: Distinguished Service Cross; Silver Star; Legion of Merit; Distinguished Flying Cross (2); Meritorious Service Medal; Air Medal (8)

Colonel Harold Edward Fischer Jr. (May 8, 1925 – April 30, 2009) was a United States Air Force fighter pilot and flying ace of the Korean War. He accrued 11 victories in the war. He is also one of the two flying aces to be Prisoners of War during the war. He was released in 1955 and continued to serve in the USAF until 1978.

== Early life ==
Fischer was born near Lone Rock, Iowa, in a farm on May 8, 1925. As a child, he enjoyed reading magazines about World War I Flying Aces. Fischer attended Iowa State University for two years.

== Military service ==
Fischer enlisted in the U.S. Navy Reserve on April 17, 1943, and entered the V-5 Aviation Cadet Program on October 8, 1943. Fischer left the V-5 program on July 10, 1944, and reverted to civilian status. He was commissioned a 2nd Lieutenant in the U.S. Army on February 16, 1949, and transferred to the U.S. Air Force on June 23, 1949. Fischer completed pilot training at Williams AFB, Arizona, in December 1950.

=== Korean War ===
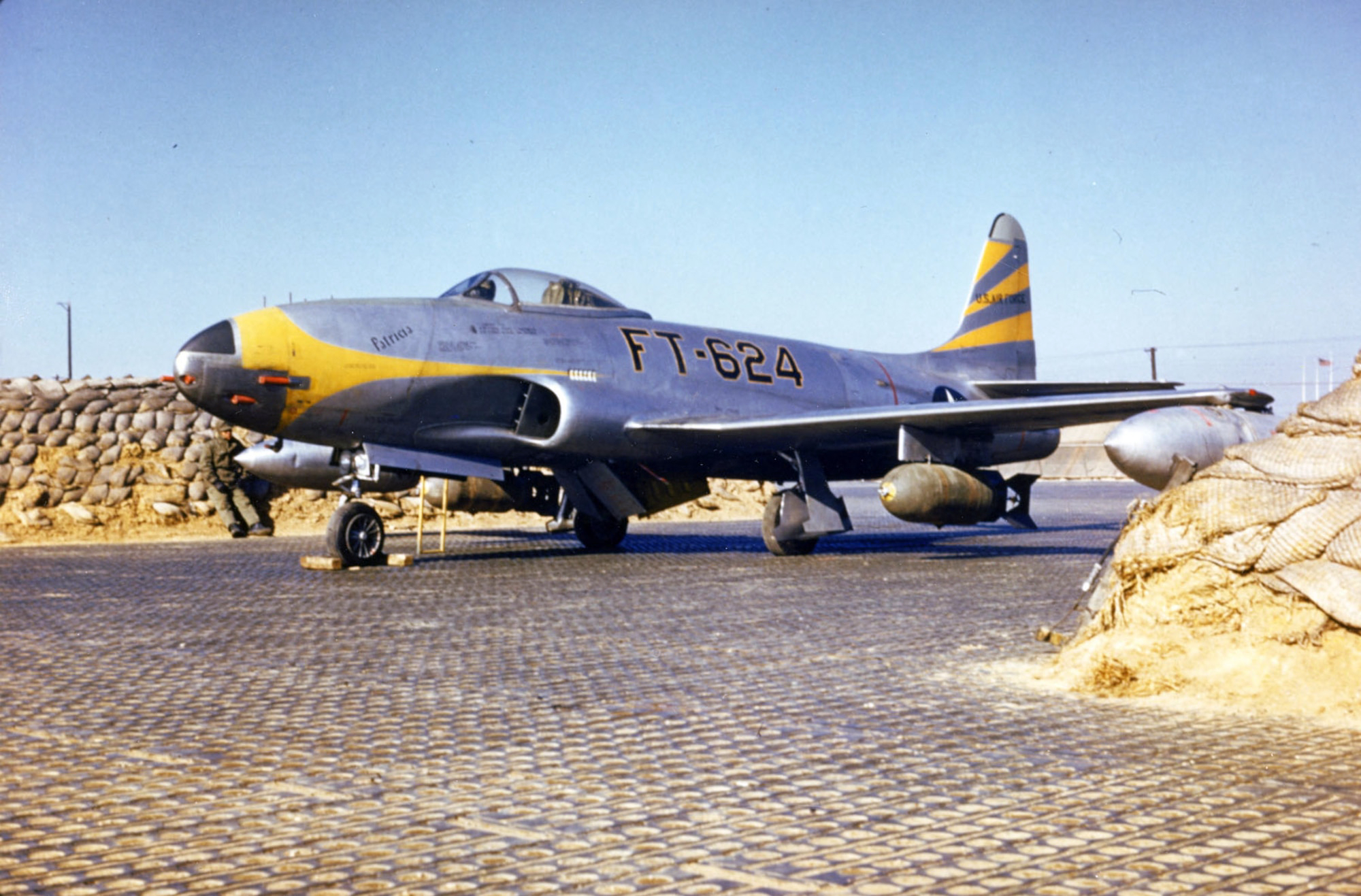
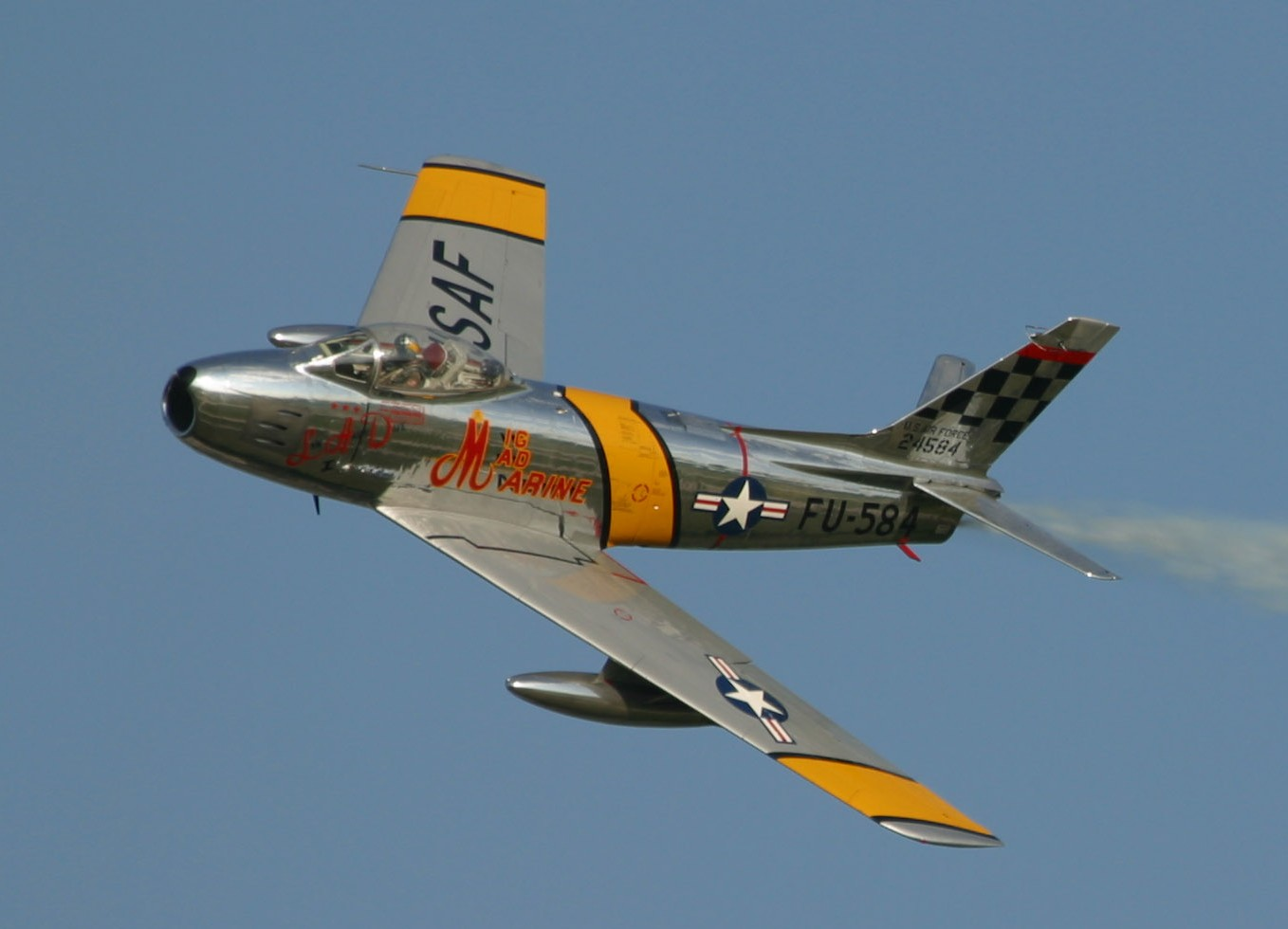
Fischer flew both F-80 Shooting Star (left) and F-86 Sabre (right) in combat missions during the Korean War.

Fischer was assigned to the 80th Fighter Bomber Squadron in Korea in April 1951. Based at Kimpo Air Base, he flew ground attack missions in the Lockheed F-80 Shooting Stars until May 1952, when he was assigned to the 41st Fighter Interceptor Squadron, flying the North American F-86 Sabre.

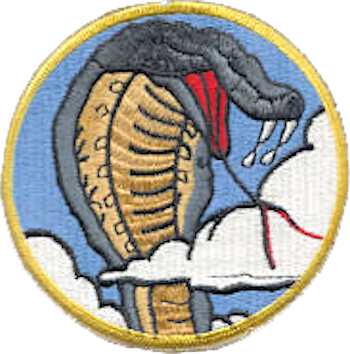
39th Fighter Interceptor Squadron

Serving with the 39th Fighter Interceptor Squadron of the 51st Fighter Interceptor Wing at Suwon Air Base, Fischer shot down eleven MiG-15s, while flying more than 175 combat missions. On April 7, 1953, he was shot down and ejected from his F-86 Sabre north of the Yalu River, in a dogfight with three MiGs that extended into Chinese territory, an area that the Air Force had specifically ordered its pilots not to enter. Contrary to these facts, the Soviets did not admit their operations alongside the Chinese in the Korean War, and dispute the consideration that a Chinese pilot had shot down Fischer. Peasants surrounded him; then Chinese soldiers pulled up in a jeep. Ten days later, he was taken to the prison near Mukden.

=== Prisoner of War ===
Fischer was taken captive by Chinese military personnel and imprisoned near Shenyang, Liaoning Province. Although the Korean Armistice Agreement called for the release of all prisoners of war, Fischer was not freed. For most of that time, he was kept in a dark, damp cell with no bed and no opening except a slot in the door through which a bowl of food could be pushed.

After a thwarted escape attempt nine months into his captivity, he was routinely tortured and ultimately admitted to trumped up charges that he had been ordered to enter Manchuria and that he had participated in germ warfare.

After a short mock trial in Beijing on May 24, 1955, Fischer and the other pilots Lt. Col. Edwin L. Heller, 1st Lt. Lyle W. Cameron and 1st Lt. Roland W. Parks — were found guilty of violating Chinese territory by flying across the border while on missions over North Korea. It led to his release in May 1955. Fischer was returned to active service two months later. He spent 784 days in captivity and was released on May 30, 1955, nearly 2 years after the Korean War ended.

=== Post release ===
After his release, Fischer received an Air Force Institute of Technology assignment to Iowa State College. He received his degree and then remained at the college, serving as an instructor in the Air Force ROTC program there from August 1957 to August 1960. Fischer next served as a target analyst at Offutt AFB, Nebraska, from August 1960 to November 1961, and then as an intelligence officer at Ramstein AB, West Germany, until August 1962.

His next assignment was as a fighter pilot with the 389th Tactical Fighter Squadron of the 366th Tactical Fighter Wing at Chaumont AB, France, where he served from August 1962 to September 1963. He then received another AFIT assignment to Oklahoma State University, where he received his PhD in February 1966. Fischer then served as a Human Factors Officer with the Test Design Division at Sandia Air Station, New Mexico, from February 1966 to August 1968. He was a research associate at the MIT Center for International Studies from August 1968 to August 1969, and then served as a planning and programs officer at Headquarters USAF at the Pentagon from August 1969 to September 1971.

During the Vietnam War, Fischer was assigned as an air force advisor to the Republic of Vietnam Air Force at Bien Hoa AB, South Vietnam, from September 1971 to October 1972. Fischer served mainly as a helicopter pilot and flew more than 200 missions over South Vietnam.

Fischer served as vice commander and then commander of the Air Force Human Resources Laboratory at Brooks AFB, Texas. Fischer's final assignment was at the Pentagon, where he retired from the Air Force on May 31, 1978.

== Personal life ==
Fischer was first married to Dorothy Herron and they had a son named Harold E. Fischer, III. The marriage ended in divorce shortly before he became a Prisoner of War. An Air Force widow, Mary Jane Erickson, wrote to Fischer during his captivity and the two married shortly after his release. His wife had a six-year-old daughter. Later, Fischer had two more sons with Mary Jane, Kurt and Clint, and a daughter who died in infancy.

After the couple divorced, he was married to Jean Cramlin. They had no children together and the marriage also ended in divorce.

== Later life ==
Fischer learned that Chinese pilot Han Decai was credited with shooting him down in 1953. Fischer met Decai, when he joined a group of Flying Tiger pilots who had been invited to visit China. He met Decai and presented him with an F-86 model. He later became friends with him.

Fischer died on April 30, 2009, in Las Vegas, Nevada, from complications after back surgery at the age of 83. He is buried at Arlington National Cemetery in Section 59.

== Awards and decorations ==
Fischer served for a full 30 years, receiving many decorations, including the Silver Star, two Distinguished Flying Crosses, and the Distinguished Service Cross.

US Air Force Command Pilot Badge
Distinguished Service Cross
Silver Star	Legion of Merit	Distinguished Flying Cross w/ 1 bronze oak leaf cluster
Meritorious Service Medal	Air Medal w/ 1 silver and 2 bronze oak leaf clusters	Joint Service Commendation Medal
Army Commendation Medal	Air Force Presidential Unit Citation w/ 1 bronze oak leaf cluster	Air Force Outstanding Unit Award
Prisoner of War Medal	American Campaign Medal	World War II Victory Medal
National Defense Service Medal w/ 1 bronze service star	Korean Service Medal w/ 1 silver and 1 bronze campaign stars	Vietnam Service Medal w/ 2 bronze campaign stars
Korea Defense Service Medal	Air Force Longevity Service Award w/ 1 silver and 1 bronze oak leaf clusters	Small Arms Expert Marksmanship Ribbon
Vietnam Air Force Distinguished Service Order (2nd Class)	Vietnam Cross of Gallantry w/ 1 Silver star	Vietnam Armed Forces Honor Medal (1st Class)
Vietnam Air Service Medal (Honor Class)	Republic of Korea Presidential Unit Citation	Republic of Vietnam Gallantry Cross
United Nations Service Medal for Korea	Vietnam Campaign Medal	Korean War Service Medal

=== Distinguished Service Cross citation ===
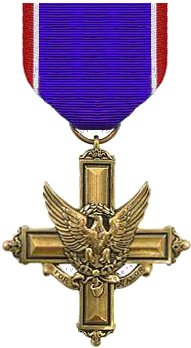

The President of the United States of America, authorized by Act of Congress July 9, 1918, takes pleasure in presenting the Distinguished Service Cross (Air Force) to Captain Harold Edward Fischer, United States Air Force, for extraordinary heroism in connection with military operations against an armed enemy of the United Nations while serving as Pilot of an F-86 aircraft, 39th Fighter-Interceptor Squadron, 51st Fighter-Interceptor Wing, Fifth Air Force, in action against enemy forces in the Republic of Korea on 16 February 1953. On that date, while leading a flight of two F-86 Sabre Jets on an air superiority mission over North Korea, Captain Fischer sighted a formation of sixteen enemy MIG-15s heading south across the Yalu River. Disregarding the odds against him, he immediately initiated an attack. Although under intense enemy fire, Captain Fischer tenaciously pursued the leading MIG-15 through violent evasive maneuvers until he had destroyed it. Completely disregarding the fact that several enemy aircraft were still firing at him, Captain Fischer skillfully maneuvered his Sabre into firing position on another MIG-15 that was attacking his wingman. Again demonstrating extreme courage and outstanding flying skill, Captain Fischer pressed his attack until the MIG-15 was destroyed. These two victories in the face of counter attacks by such superior numbers unnerved the enemy to the extent that they withdrew into Manchuria before further attacks could be made. By his outstanding heroism, his complete disregard for personal safety and high sense of duty, Captain Fischer reflected great credit upon himself, the Far East Air Forces, and the United States Air Force.

== See also ==
- List of Korean War flying aces
