= Gabby Gabreski =

American flying ace (1919–2002)

Francis Stanley Gabreski
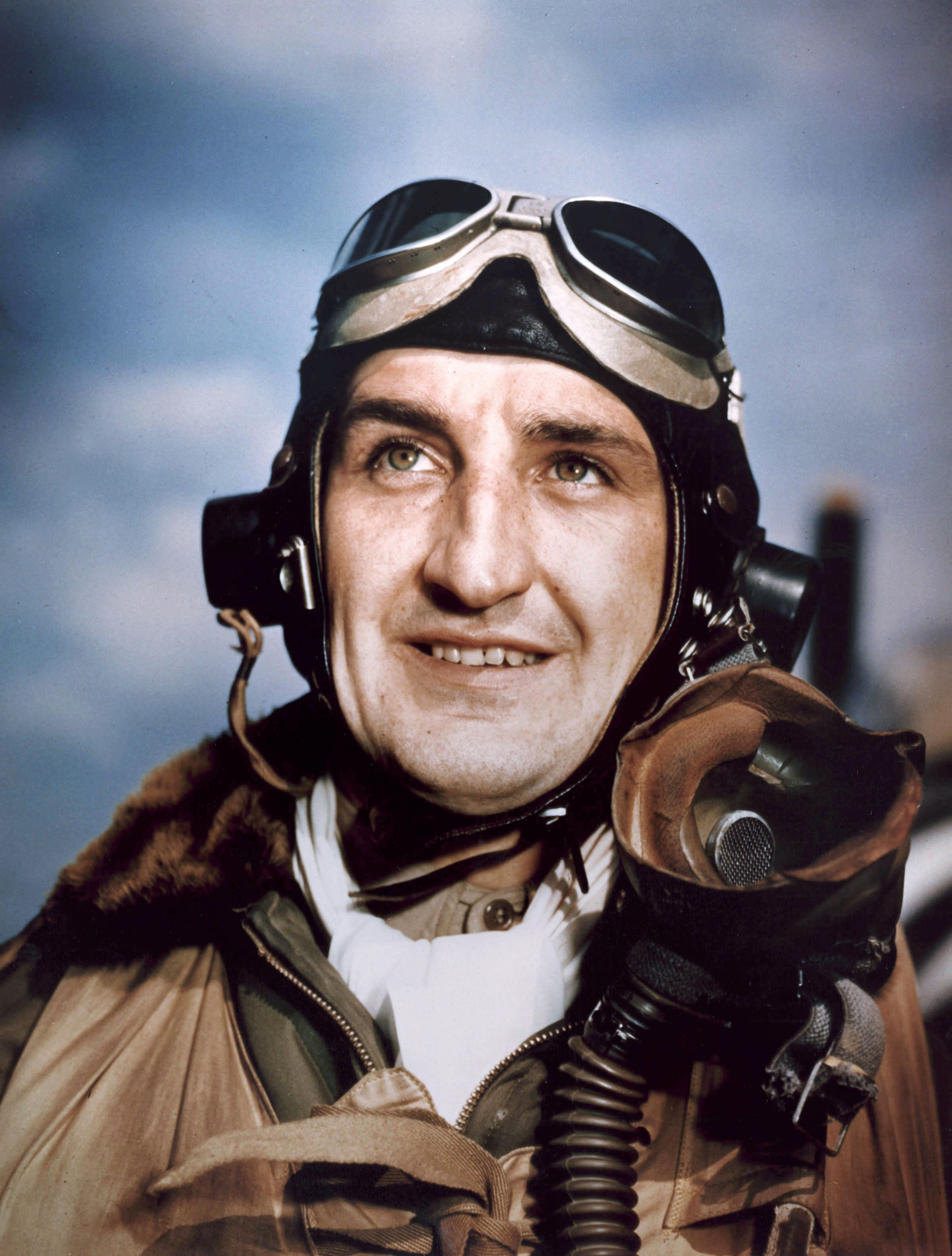
- Born: January 20, 1919; Oil City, Pennsylvania, U.S.
- Died: January 31, 2002 (aged 83); Huntington, New York, U.S.
- Burial place: Calverton National Cemetery
- Military career
- Allegiance: United States
- Branch: United States Army Air Corps; United States Army Air Forces; United States Air Force
- Service years: 1940–1967
- Rank: Colonel
- Nickname: Gabby
- Units: 15th Pursuit Group; No. 315 Polish Fighter Squadron; 4th Fighter-Interceptor Group
- Commands: 61st Fighter Squadron; 55th Fighter Squadron; 56th Fighter Group; 51st Fighter-Interceptor Wing; 354th Tactical Fighter Wing; 18th Tactical Fighter Wing; 52nd Fighter Wing
- Conflicts: World War II; Korean War
- Awards: Distinguished Service Cross; Army Distinguished Service Medal; Silver Star (2); Legion of Merit; Distinguished Flying Cross (13); Bronze Star Medal; Air Medal (7)
- Other work: Grumman Aerospace

Francis Stanley "Gabby" Gabreski (born Franciszek Stanisław Gabryszewski; January 28, 1919 – January 31, 2002) was a Polish-American career pilot in the United States Air Force who retired as a colonel after 26 years of military service. He was the top American and United States Army Air Forces fighter ace over Europe during World War II and a jet fighter ace with the Air Force in the Korean War.

Although best known for his credited destruction of 34½ aircraft in aerial combat and being one of only seven U.S. combat pilots to become an ace in two wars, Gabreski was also one of the Air Force's most accomplished leaders. In addition to commanding two fighter squadrons, he had six command tours at group or wing level, including one in combat in Korea, totaling over 11 years of command and 15 overall in operational fighter assignments.

After his Air Force career, Gabreski headed the Long Island Rail Road, a commuter railroad owned by the State of New York, and struggled in his attempts to improve its service and financial condition. After two and a half years, he resigned under pressure and went into full retirement.

== Early years ==
Gabreski's official Air Force biography states:

Gabreski's parents had emigrated from Frampol, Poland to Oil City, Pennsylvania, in the early 1900s. His father (Stanisław "Stanley" Gabryszewski) owned and operated a market, putting in 12-hour days. As in many other immigrant-owned businesses in those days, the whole family worked at the market. But Gabreski's parents had dreams for him, including attending the University of Notre Dame. He did so in 1938, but, unprepared for real academic work, almost failed during his freshman year.

During his first year at Notre Dame, Gabreski developed an interest in flying. He took lessons in a Taylor Cub and accumulated six hours of flight time. However, his autobiography indicates, he struggled to fly smoothly and did not fly solo, having been advised by his instructor Homer Stockert that he did not "have the touch to be a pilot".

== World War II ==
=== U.S. Army Air Forces ===
At the start of his second year at Notre Dame in 1939, Gabreski enlisted in the United States Army Air Corps, volunteering as an aviation cadet. After his induction into the U.S. Army at Pittsburgh, he undertook primary flight training at Parks Air College, near East St. Louis, Illinois, flying the Stearman PT-17. Gabreski was a mediocre trainee and was forced to pass an elimination check ride during primary to continue training.

He advanced to basic flight training at Gunter Army Air Base, Alabama, in the Vultee BT-13 and completed advanced training at Maxwell Field, Alabama, in the North American AT-6 Texan. Gabreski earned his wings and his commission as a second lieutenant in the Air Corps in March 1941, then sailed for Hawaii aboard the SS Washington to his first assignment.

Second lieutenant Gabby Gabreski (left) and first lieutenant Cyclone Davis (second from left) at the Wheeler Field Officers Club, Hawaii, 1941

External videos
- Gabby Gabreski
- Francis Stanley "Gabby" Gabreski’s Biography)

Assigned as a fighter pilot with the 45th Pursuit Squadron of the 15th Pursuit Group at Wheeler Army Airfield, Hawaii, 2nd Lt. Gabreski trained on both the Curtiss P-36 Hawk and the newer Curtiss P-40 Warhawk. He met his future wife, Catherine "Kay" Cochran, in Hawaii and became engaged shortly after the Japanese attack on Pearl Harbor. During that action, Gabreski joined several members of his squadron in flying P-36 fighters in an attempt to intercept the attackers, but the Japanese had withdrawn. During the spring and summer of 1942, Gabreski remained with the 45th (renamed as 45th Fighter Squadron in May 1942), training in newer model P-40s and in Bell P-39 Airacobras that the unit began to receive.

He closely followed reports on the Battle of Britain and the role played in it by Polish RAF squadrons, especially by the legendary No. 303 Polish Fighter Squadron. He became concerned that the US did not have many experienced fighter pilots. This gave him an idea: since Polish squadrons had proved to be capable within the RAF and since he himself was of Polish origin and spoke Polish, he offered to serve as a liaison officer to the Polish squadrons to learn from their experience. The idea was approved, and he left Hawaii for Washington, D.C., in September 1942, where he was promoted to captain.

==== RAF duty ====
In October, Gabreski reported to the Eighth Air Force's VIII Fighter Command in England, at that time a rudimentary new headquarters. After a lengthy period of inactivity, he tried to arrange duty with 303 Squadron, but that unit had been taken out of action for a period of rest. Instead, he was posted to No. 315 (Dęblin) Squadron at RAF Northolt in January 1943.

Gabreski flew the new Supermarine Spitfire Mark IX, flying patrol sweeps over the Channel. He first encountered Luftwaffe opposition on February 3, when a group of Focke-Wulf Fw 190s jumped his squadron. Overcome with excitement, Gabreski learned that he had to keep calm during a mission, a lesson that served him well later in the war. He later spoke with great esteem about the Polish pilots and the lessons they taught him. In all, Gabreski flew 20 missions with the Poles, engaging in combat once.

==== 56th Fighter Group ====
On February 27, 1943, Gabreski became part of the 56th Fighter Group, flying the Republic P-47 Thunderbolt, assigned to the 61st Fighter Squadron, and quickly became a flight leader. He was immediately resented by many of his fellow pilots, and the fact that he was opinionated and outspoken did little to ease the situation. In May, shortly after the group moved to RAF Halesworth and entered combat, Gabreski was promoted to major.

On June 9, he took command of the 61st Fighter Squadron when its commanding officer was moved up to group deputy commander. This also stirred ill feelings toward him since he had been jumped over two more senior pilots. This ill-will was soon exacerbated when both of these men were lost in combat on June 26 and did not subside until he recorded his first credited kill: an Fw 190 near Dreux, France, on August 24, 1943. His first kill presaged criticism that followed him throughout his combat career, when his wingmen complained that his attack had been too hastily conducted to allow them to also engage.

On November 26, 1943, the 56th FG was assigned to cover the withdrawal of Boeing B-17 Flying Fortress bombers that had bombed Bremen, Germany. The P-47s arrived to find the bombers under heavy attack near Oldenburg and dived into the fray. Gabreski recorded his fourth and fifth kills to become an ace, but had a close brush with death on December 11, when a 20 mm (.79 in) cannon shell lodged in his engine without exploding, destroying its turbocharger. Low on fuel and ammunition, Gabreski outmaneuvered a Bf 109 until it succeeded in placing a burst of fire into his P-47, disabling the engine. Gabreski stayed in the airplane, however, until it restarted at a lower altitude, where the turbocharger was not needed.

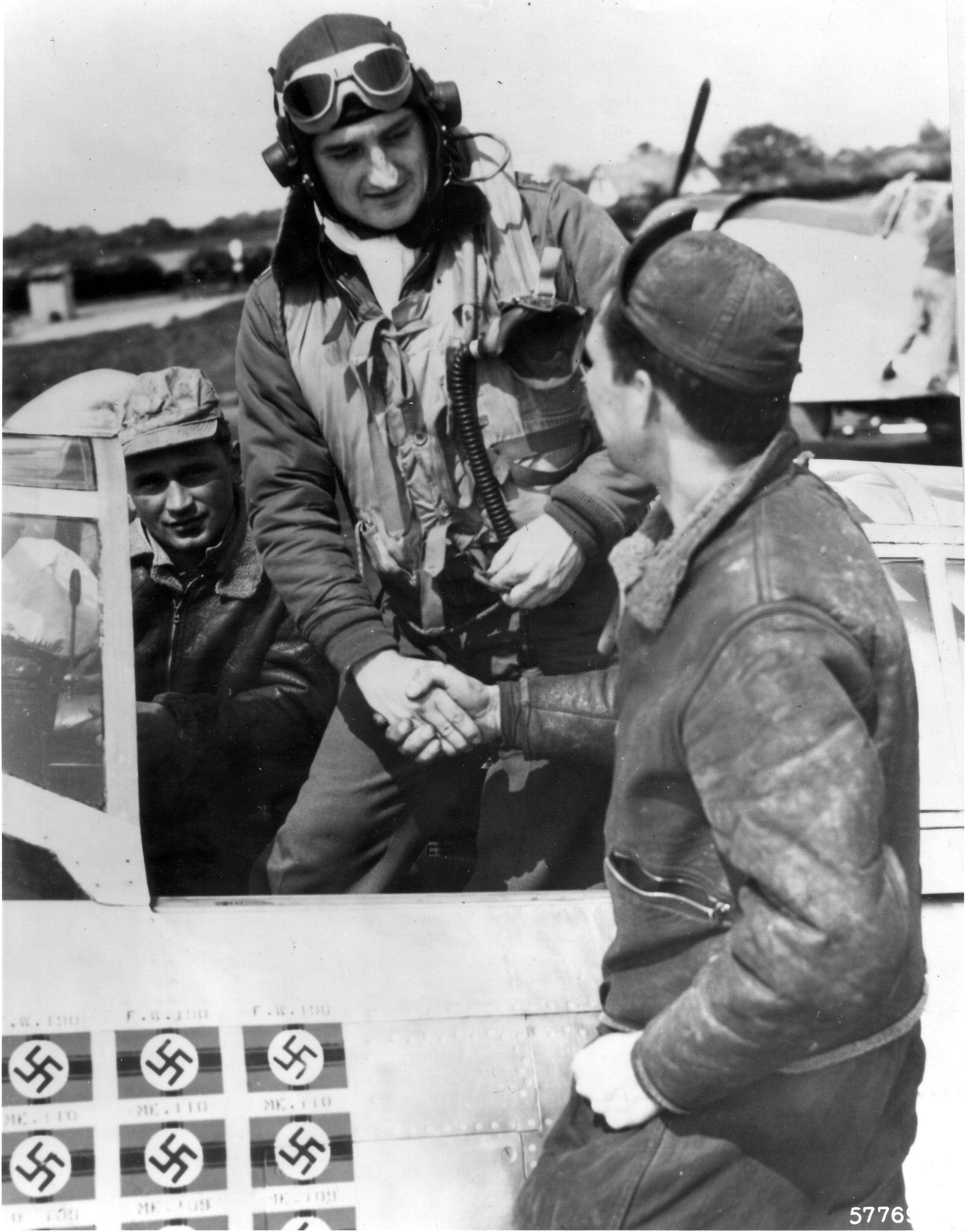
Gabreski and S/Sgt. Ralph Safford, his crew chief. The assistant crew chief Felix Schacki is in the background.

In November 1943, the group commander of the 56th, Colonel Hubert Zemke, was replaced in command for two months by Colonel Robert Landry, a staff officer at VIII FC. Because of Landry's inexperience, combat missions of the 56th were alternately led by deputy commander Lieutenant Colonel David C. Schilling and Gabreski, who acted as deputy group operations officer. When Zemke resumed command on January 19, 1944, Gabreski relinquished command of the 61st FS.

In February 1944, Gabreski brought two Polish pilots into the 56th, who had flown with him in 1943 while serving with the RAF, including future USAAF ace Squadron Leader Boleslaw "Mike" Gladych. With Gabreski's support and to ease a shortage of experienced pilots caused by many veterans reaching the completion of their tours, the 61st FS in April accepted five other Polish Air Force pilots into the squadron as the "Polish Flight".

Gabreski's victory total steadily climbed through the winter of 1943–44. By March 27, he had 18 victory credits and had six multiple-kill missions to rank third in the "ace race" that had developed within VIII Fighter Command. He downed only one more aircraft in the next two months, during which time the two pilots ahead of him (Majors Robert S. Johnson and Walker M. Mahurin, also of the 56th FG) were sent home.

In April 1944, the 56th FG moved to RAF Boxted and Gabreski was promoted to lieutenant colonel. He resumed command of the 61st FS when its commander was transferred to VIII FC headquarters.

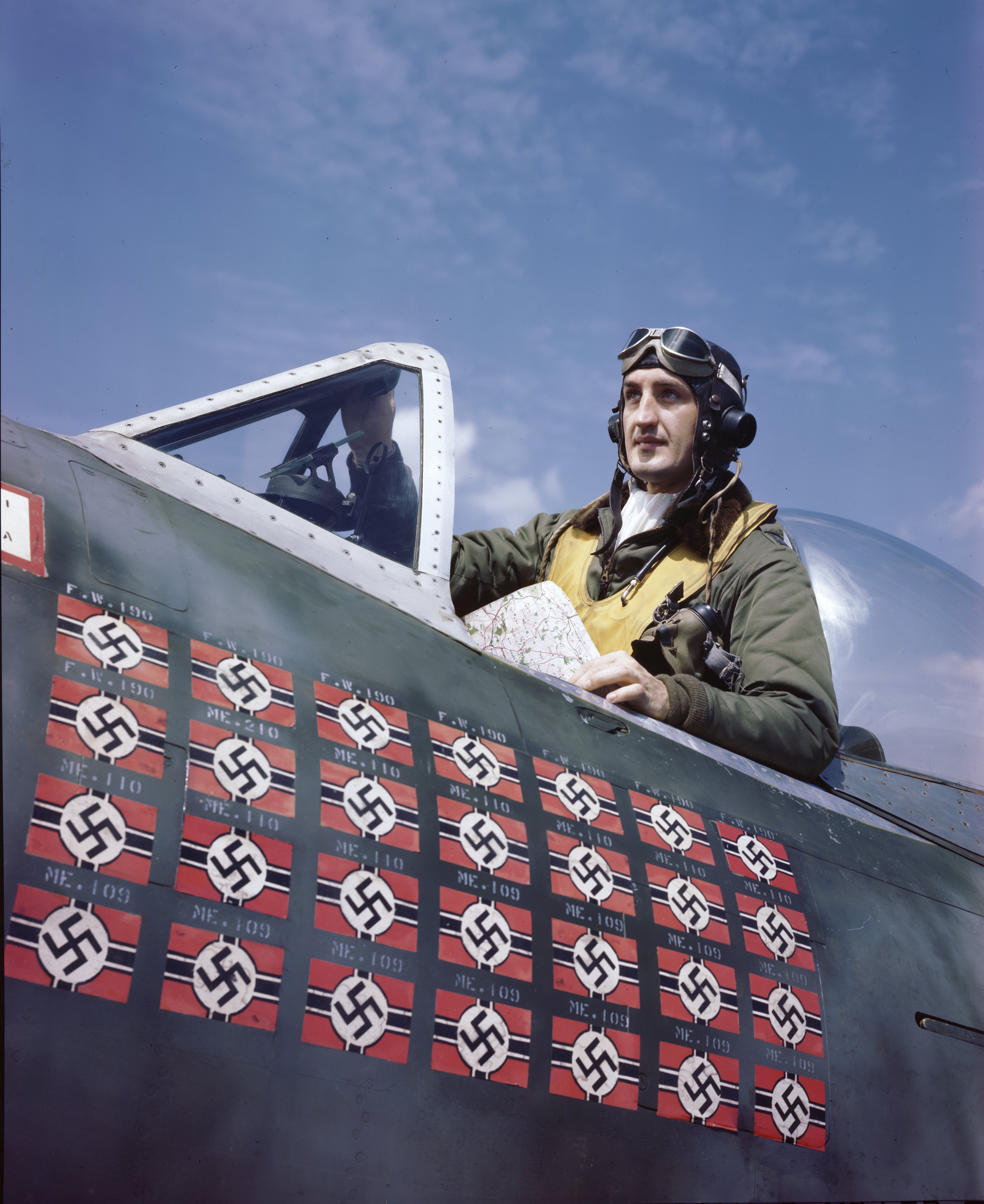
Gabreski in the cockpit of his P-47 after his 28th victory

On May 22, Gabreski shot down three Fw 190s over an airfield in northwest Germany. He tied Johnson as the leading ace in the European Theater of Operations on June 27 (passing Eddie Rickenbacker's record from World War I in the process), and on July 5, 1944, became America's leading ace in the ETO, with his score of 28 destroyed matching the total at the time of confirmed victories of the Pacific Theatre's top American ace, Richard Bong. This total was never surpassed by any U.S. pilot fighting the Luftwaffe.

==== Prisoner of war; overall combat record ====
On July 20, 1944, Gabreski had reached the 300-hour combat time limit for Eighth Air Force fighter pilots and was awaiting an aircraft to return him to the United States on leave and reassignment. He had already advised Kay Cochran to proceed with wedding plans, and his hometown of Oil City, Pennsylvania, had raised $2,000 for a wedding present in anticipation of his return.

Gabreski found, however, that a bomber escort mission to Rüsselsheim, Germany, was scheduled for that morning, and, instead of boarding the transport, he requested to "fly just one more." Returning from the mission, Gabreski observed Heinkel He 111s parked on the airfield at Niedermendig, Germany, and took his airplane down to attack.

He was dissatisfied with his first strafing run on an He 111, and he reversed for a second pass. When his tracers went over a parked bomber, he dropped the nose of his Thunderbolt to adjust, and its propeller clipped the runway, bending the tips. The damage caused his engine to vibrate violently and he was forced to crash land. Gabreski then ran into the nearby woods and eluded capture for five days. After being captured, he was interrogated by Obergefreiter Hanns Scharff. He was eventually sent to Stalag Luft I, and spent the rest of the war in captivity.

Gabreski flew 166 combat sorties and was officially credited by the USAAF with 28 aircraft destroyed in air combat and 3 on the ground. He was assigned five P-47s during his time with the 56th FG, none of which he named, but all of which bore the fuselage identification codes HV: A.

== U.S. Air Force career ==
Following his repatriation at war's end, Gabreski returned to the United States and married Kay Cochran on June 11, 1945. After a 90-day recuperative leave, he became Chief of Fighter Test Section at Wright Field, Ohio, and at the same time completed test pilot training at its Engineering Flight Test School. In April 1946, he left the service, worked for Douglas Aircraft for a year, then was recalled to active duty in April 1947 to command the 55th Fighter Squadron, 20th Fighter Group, at Shaw Air Force Base, South Carolina.

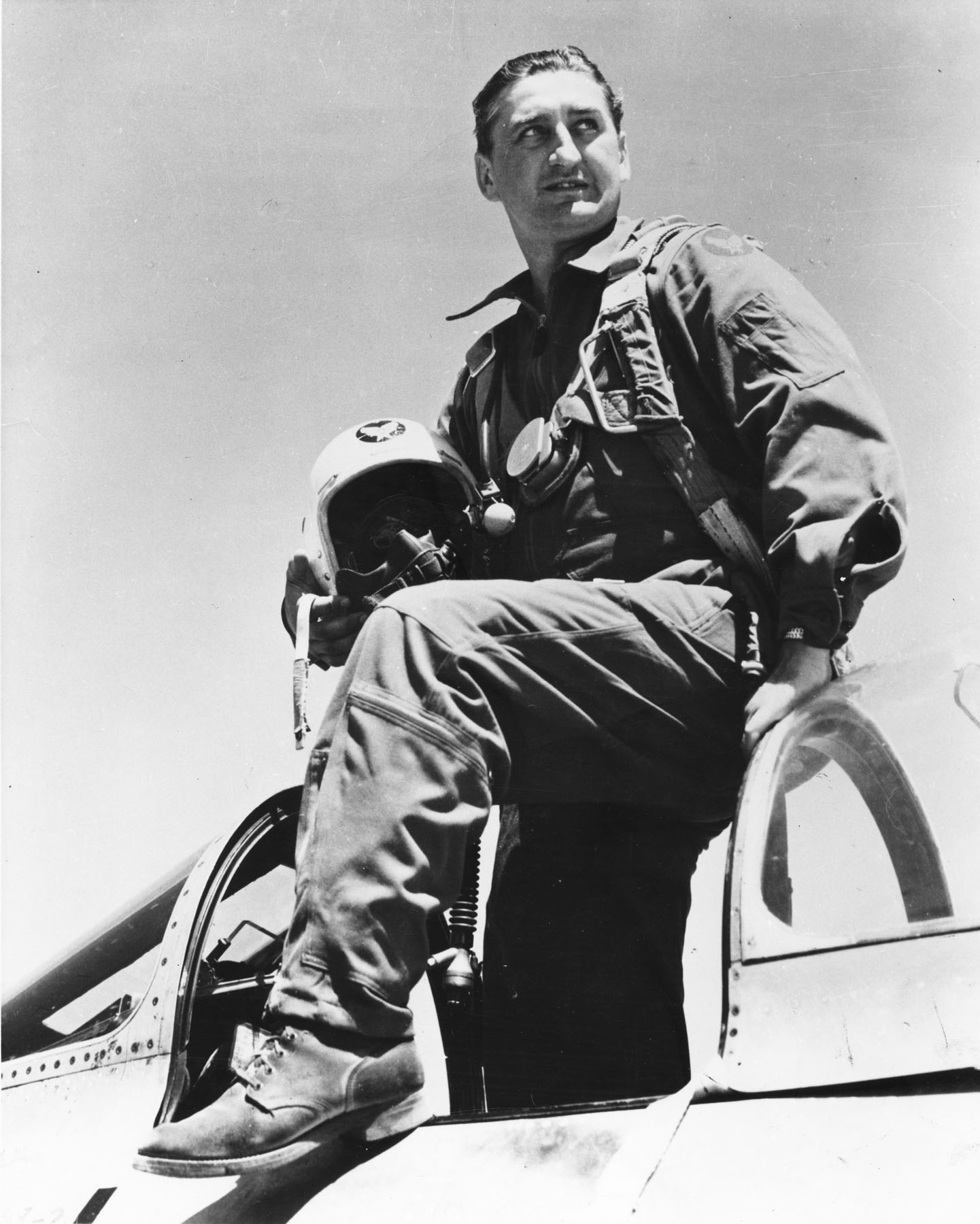
Gabreski stepping out of his Sabre, April 1950

His command of the 55th FS was brief. The Air Force sent him to Columbia University in September 1947 to complete his degree and study Russian. In June 1949, he graduated with a Bachelor of Arts in Political Science. He returned immediately to flying, becoming commander of his former unit, the 56th Fighter Group, then flying F-80 Shooting Stars at Selfridge Air Force Base, Michigan. While in command of the 56th, Gabreski oversaw conversion of the unit to North American F-86 Sabres and was promoted to colonel on March 11, 1950.

=== Korean War ===
He participated in aerial combat again during the Korean War. In June 1951, he and a group of selected pilots of the 56th FIW accompanied the delivery of F-86Es of the 62nd Fighter-Interceptor Squadron to South Korea aboard the escort carrier USS Cape Esperance. The planes and pilots joined the 4th Fighter-Interceptor Group at K-14 (Kimpo) Air Base, where most engaged in combat. On July 8, 1951, flying his fifth mission in an F-86, Gabreski shot down a MiG-15, followed by MiG kills on September 2 and October 2.

==== 51st Fighter-Interceptor Wing ====
The growing MiG threat against Boeing B-29 Superfortress bomber attacks along the Yalu River caused the Fifth Air Force to create a second Sabre wing by converting the 51st Fighter-Interceptor Wing from F-80s to F-86s in a 10-day period. Gabreski was transferred to K-13 (Suwon) Air Base, accompanied by most of the former 56th FIW pilots who had come with him to Korea, and took command November 6, 1951. During its first seven months as an F-86 wing, the 51st, with only two operational squadrons, scored 96 MiG kills, comparing favorably to the 125 of the veteran 4th Fighter-Interceptor Wing, which operated three. Gabreski himself scored 3½ more kills to become a jet ace.

He was an aggressive commander and fostered a fierce rivalry between the two F-86 wings, fueled in part by the fact that the 4th had also been the keenest rival of the 56th FG during World War II. While this aggressiveness paid off in the destruction of MiGs and air superiority over all of Korea, it also led Gabreski to make the first intentional violation of rules of engagement that prohibited combat with MiGs over China. (The MiG force was based in this ostensible sanctuary during the entire war.) Gabreski and a fellow former 56th pilot, Colonel Walker M. Mahurin, planned and executed a mission in early 1952 in which the F-86s turned off their IFF equipment and overflew two Chinese bases.

Gabreski was also criticized for having a poor attitude towards wingmen. One historian, citing five interviews with pilots and an unpublished manuscript by a sixth, observed that Gabreski flew the fastest aircraft available and failed to respond when his slower wingmen could not keep up. These pilots, reportedly afraid to fly with him, commented that he was more interested in personal achievement than in his wingmen. He was also criticized for a lack of discipline among his off-duty pilots and for allegedly encouraging exaggerated kill claims.

Nonetheless, at least three wingmen had different views. 1st Lieutenant Joe L. Cannon of the 51st FIW flew over 40 missions with him and described Gabreski as a mentor and "my kind of fighter pilot". 1st Lt. Harry Shumate, another 51st FIW pilot, stated that while flying wingman in Gabreski's flight, Shumate was the first to spot a MiG-15 heading for its base and Gabreski told him to "go get him" while the leader covered. A 4th FIW pilot, 1st Lt. Anthony Kulengosky, observed:

I moved up in the world of wingmen by flying Col. Francis Gabreski's wing on a mission. I was absolutely thrilled to fly on this legend's wing...He was a tiger and went on to become an ace again. When asked who I looked up to the most as a pilot and a gentleman in all my flying, I still have to say it was "Gabby" Gabreski. When he took over the 51st Wing, he asked me to move over as a flight leader in his outfit.

Capt. Robert W. "Smitty" Smith, a 4th FIW pilot in Korea, recalled:

Shortly after my arrival, Gabby flew the first F-86E to arrive on base in simulated combat over the field against an F-86A and whipped the other guy badly, with every Sabre jock on the base as witness. After he landed he briefed all pilots and announced that the limited number of E's would be reserved for flight leaders. I never forgot his response, when someone asked about the problem of wingmen staying with leaders. He replied "Wingmen are to absorb firepower" and I never knew him well enough to judge whether he had a dry sense of humor, but he made the right choice. One thing I know for sure, Gabby proved himself the greatest at our skills and talents, when he added 6 ½ MIG kills to his 28 victories in WW II and become the all-time American Fighter Ace, and I MIGht [sic] add, he did it in the P-47, not the better air-to-air P-51. And he didn't have a chance to fly the much more powerful F-86F, which arrived after us.

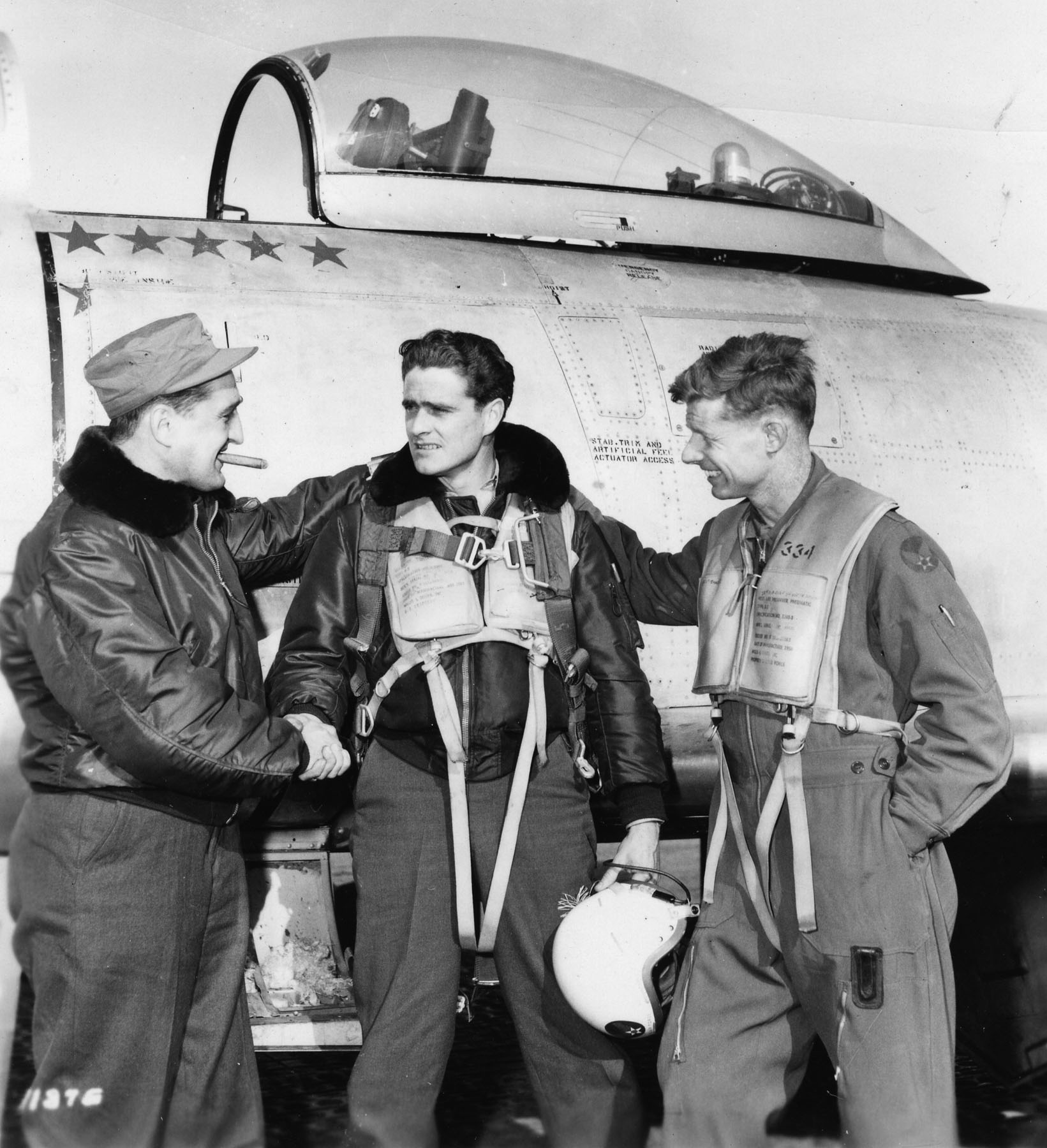
Gabreski (left) congratulating Whisner

A noted pilot also rebuts some of the criticism. Major William T. Whisner had been a P-51 double-ace with the 352nd FG in World War II and was one of the pilots Gabreski brought with him from the 56th FIW in June 1951. Before the mission of February 20, 1952, Gabreski and Whisner each had four MiGs credited as destroyed. During the mission, Gabreski attacked and severely damaged a MiG-15 that fled across the Yalu River into China. He broke off the engagement and returned to base after his own airplane was damaged, where he claimed the MiG as a "probable kill".

Whisner trailed the MiG deep into Manchuria trying to confirm Gabreski's kill, but his Sabre ran low on fuel. He completed the shootdown and returned to K-14 where he confirmed the kill for Gabreski but did not claim it himself. Gabreski confronted him and angrily ordered him to change his mission report, confirming Whisner's own role in the kill. Whisner refused. Soon after, Gabreski recanted his anger and the two shared the claim, as a consequence of which three days later Whisner and not Gabreski became the first pilot of the 51st FW to reach jet ace status.

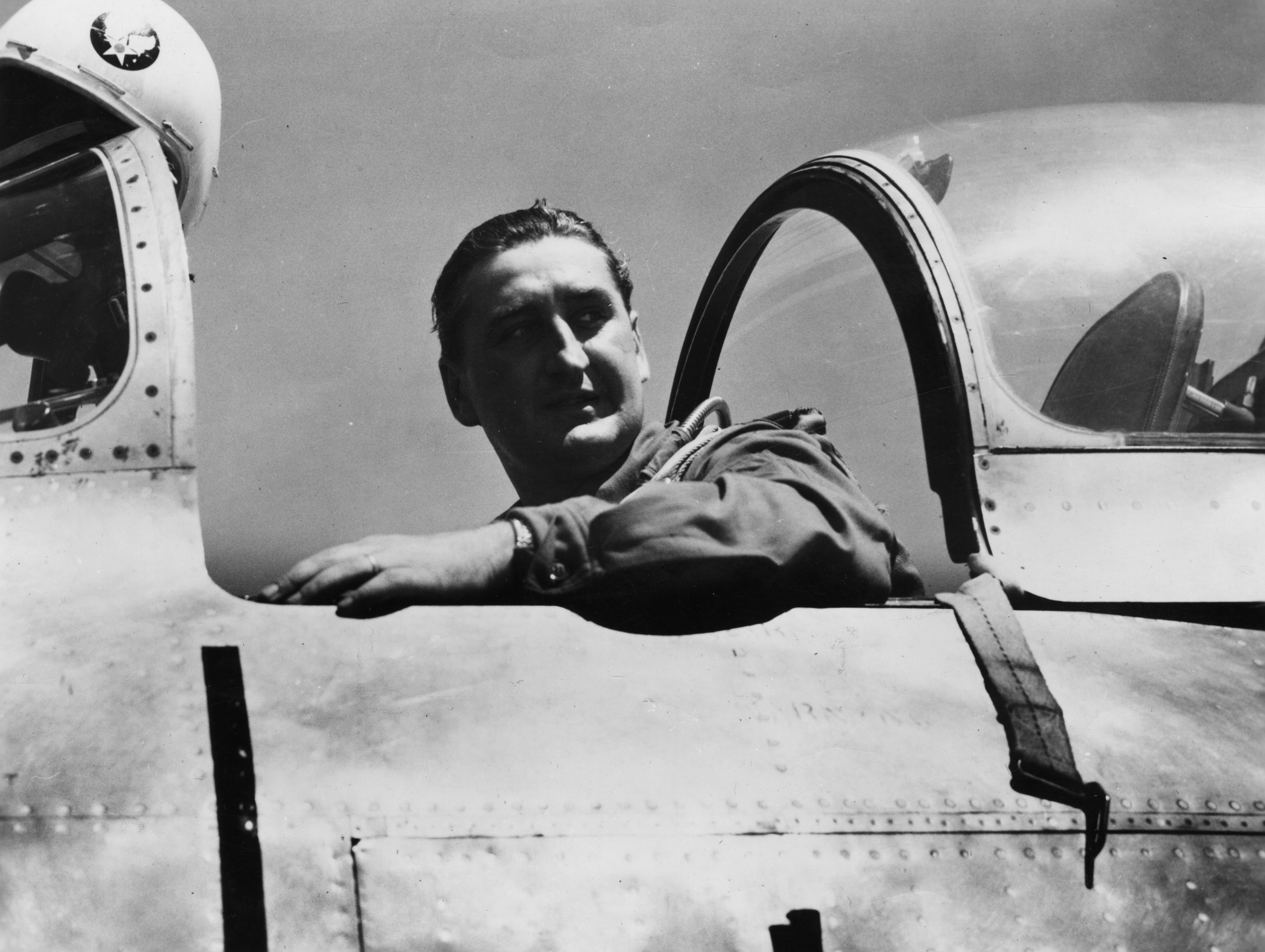
Gabreski in the cockpit of his Sabre after returning from a mission, 1952

Gabreski's Korean tour was due to end in June 1952. As he approached his mission limit in early April, he quit logging sorties to avoid being transferred from his command. He was, however, grounded by Fifth Air Force from further combat in mid-May when his deputy commander, Colonel Mahurin, was shot down. Gabreski was subsequently replaced by Colonel John W. Mitchell, who had led the mission to shoot down Admiral Yamamoto in World War II.

On his return to the United States, Gabreski received the key to the city from San Francisco Mayor Elmer E. Robinson and was given a ticker-tape parade up Market Street on June 17.

Gabreski's 6½ MiG-15 kill credits make him one of seven U.S. pilots to become an ace in more than one war (the others being Whisner, Colonel Harrison Thyng, Colonel James P. Hagerstrom, Colonel Vermont Garrison, Major George A. Davis, Jr. and U.S. Marine Corps Lieutenant Colonel John F. Bolt). Gabreski was officially credited with 123 combat missions in Korea, totaling 289 for his career. Although he flew many F-86s in combat, his assigned aircraft was F-86E-10-NA 51-2740, nicknamed "Gabby".

=== Post-Korea ===
Gabreski's Air Force career continued for another 15 years, during which time he held three wing commands totaling nearly nine years of duty. His assignments were:

- Chief of Combat Operations Section, Office of the Inspector General — Norton Air Force Base, California (July 1952 – June 1954)
- Student, Air War College — Maxwell Air Force Base, Alabama (1954–1955)
- Deputy Chief of Staff, Headquarters Ninth Air Force — Shaw Air Force Base, South Carolina (July 1955 – August 1956)
- Commander, 342d Fighter-Day Wing — Myrtle Beach Air Force Base, South Carolina (September 10, 1956 – November 19, 1956) (inactivated before operational and succeeded by 354th TFW)
- Commander, 354th Tactical Fighter Wing (F-100 Super Sabre) — Myrtle Beach Air Force Base, South Carolina (November 19, 1956 – July 13, 1960)
- Commander, 18th Tactical Fighter Wing (F-100) — Kadena Air Base, Okinawa (August 8, 1960 – June 19, 1962)
- Director of the Secretariat, Headquarters Pacific Air Forces — Hickam Air Force Base, Hawaii (July 1962 – July 1963)
- Inspector General, Pacific Air Forces — Hickam Air Force Base, Hawaii (July 1963 – August 1964)
- Commander, 52d Fighter Wing (Air Defense) (McDonnell F-101 Voodoo) — Suffolk County Air Force Base, New York (August 17, 1964 – October 31, 1967)

Gabreski retired on November 1, 1967. Per his USAF official biography, he retired with more than 5,000 flying hours, 4,000 of them in jets.

== Aerial victory credits ==
Chronicle of aerial victories
| Date | # | Type | Location | Aircraft flown | Unit Assigned |
|---|---|---|---|---|---|
| August 24, 1943 | 1 | Focke-Wulf Fw 190 | Dreux, France | P-47D | 61 FS, 56 FG |
| September 3, 1943 | 1 | Fw 190 | St-Germain, France | P-47D | 61 FS, 56 FG |
| November 11, 1943 | 1 | Fw 190 | Rheine, Germany | P-47D | 61 FS, 56 FG |
| November 26, 1943 | 2 | Messerschmitt Bf 110 | Oldenburg, Germany | P-47D | 61 FS, 56 FG |
| November 29, 1943 | 2 | Messerschmitt Bf 109 | Bremen, Germany | P-47D | 61 FS, 56 FG |
| December 11, 1943 | 1 | Bf 110 | Emden, Germany | P-47D | 61 FS, 56 FG |
| January 29, 1944 | 1 | Bf 110 | Emden, Germany | P-47D | 56 FG Hq |
| January 30, 1944 | 1 | Messerschmitt Me 410 | Lingen, Germany | P-47D | 56 FG Hq |
| January 30, 1944 | 1 | Bf 109 | Lingen, Germany | P-47D | 56 FG Hq |
| February 20, 1944 | 2 | Me 410 | Koblenz, Germany | P-47D | 56 FG Hq |
| February 22, 1944 | 1 | Fw 190 | Paderborn, Germany | P-47D | 56 FG Hq |
| March 16, 1944 | 2 | Fw 190 | Nancy, France | P-47D | 56 FG Hq |
| March 27, 1944 | 2 | Bf 109 | Nantes, France | P-47D | 56 FG Hq |
| May 8, 1944 | 1 | Bf 109 | Celle, Germany | P-47D | 61 FS, 56 FG |
| May 22, 1944 | 3 | Fw 190 | Höperhöfen, Germany | P-47D | 61 FS, 56 FG |
| June 7, 1944 | 1 | Bf 109 | Dreux, France | P-47D | 61 FS, 56 FG |
| June 7, 1944 | 1 | Fw 190 | Dreux, France | P-47D | 61 FS, 56 FG |
| June 12, 1944 | 2 | Bf 109 | Évreux, France | P-47D | 61 FS, 56 FG |
| June 27, 1944 | 1 | Bf 109 | Connantre, France | P-47D | 61 FS, 56 FG |
| July 5, 1944 | 1 | Bf 109 | Évreux, France | P-47D | 61 FS, 56 FG |
| July 5, 1951 | 1 | MiG-15 | North Korea | North American F-86A Sabre | 4 FIG |
| September 2, 1951 | 1 | MiG-15 | North Korea | F-86A | 4 FIG |
| October 2, 1951 | 1 | MiG-15 | North Korea | F-86A | 4 FIG |
| January 11, 1952 | 1 | MiG-15 | Dandong, China ? | F-86E | 51 FIW |
| February 20, 1952 | 0.5 | MiG-15 | North Korea | F-86E | 51 FIW |
| April 1, 1952 | 1 | MiG-15 | North Korea | F-86E | 51 FIW |
| April 13, 1952 | 1 | MiG-15 | North Korea | F-86E | 51 FIW |

SOURCES: Air Force Historical Study 85: USAF Credits for the Destruction of Enemy Aircraft, World War II and Air Force Historical Study 81: USAF Credits for the Destruction of Enemy Aircraft, Korean War, Freeman 1993, pp. 272–273.

== Military awards ==
Gabreski's military decorations and awards include:

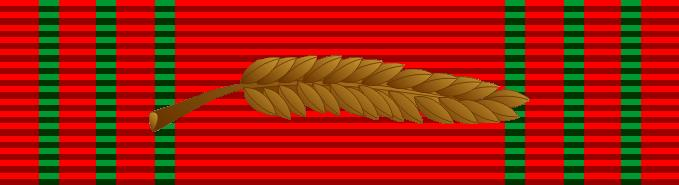
| Command pilot badge |
| Distinguished Service Cross |
| Distinguished Service Medal |
| Silver Star with bronze oak leaf cluster |
| Legion of Merit |
| Distinguished Flying Cross with two silver and two bronze oak leaf clusters |
| Bronze Star Medal |
| Air Medal with silver and bronze oak leaf clusters |
| Air Force Presidential Unit Citation with bronze oak leaf cluster |
| Air Force Outstanding Unit Award |
| Prisoner of War Medal |
| American Defense Service Medal with one service star |
| American Campaign Medal |
| Asiatic-Pacific Campaign Medal with bronze campaign star |
| European-African-Middle Eastern Campaign Medal with two bronze campaign stars |
| World War II Victory Medal |
| Army of Occupation Medal |
| National Defense Service Medal with one service star |
| Korean Service Medal with two bronze campaign stars |
| Air Force Longevity Service Award with silver oak leaf cluster |
| Distinguished Flying Cross (United Kingdom) |
| Chevalier of the Legion of Honour (France) |
| Croix de Guerre with Palm (France) |
| Croix de Guerre with Palm (Belgium) |
| Polish Cross of Valour (Polish: Krzyż Walecznych) (Poland) |
| Republic of Korea Presidential Unit Citation |
| United Nations Service Medal for Korea |
| Korean War Service Medal |

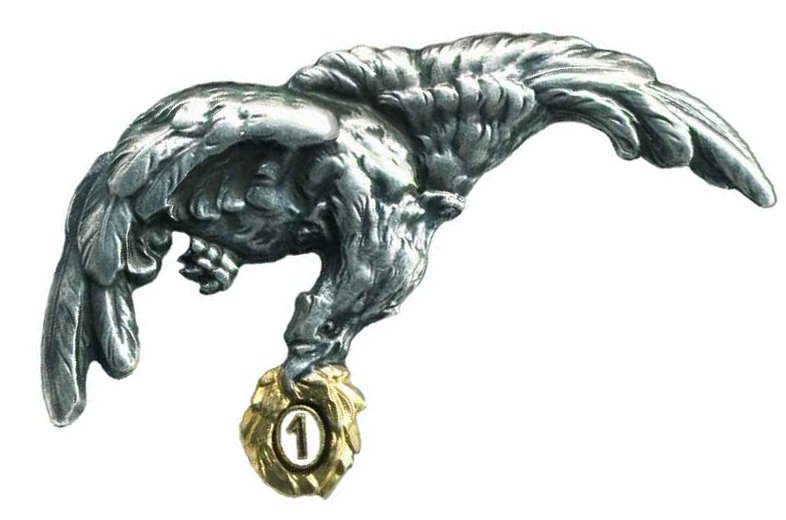
- Polish Pilot Badge
- No. 315 Polish Fighter Squadron Badge

=== Distinguished Service Cross citation ===

Gabreski, Francis S.
Lieutenant Colonel [then Major], U.S. Army Air Forces
61st Fighter Squadron, 56th Fighter Group, Eighth Air force
Date of Action: November 26, 1943

Citation:

The President of the United States of America, authorized by Act of Congress, July 9, 1918, takes pleasure in presenting the Distinguished Service Cross to Lieutenant Colonel (Air Corps), [then Major] Francis Stanley Gabreski, United States Army Air Forces, for extraordinary heroism in connection with military operations against an armed enemy while serving as Pilot of a P-47 Fighter Airplane in the 61st Fighter Squadron, 56th Fighter Group, Eighth Air force, in aerial combat against enemy forces on November 26, 1943, in the European Theater of Operations. On this date, Colonel Gabreski led a flight of P-47 fighters on a bomber escort mission to targets near Oldenburg, Germany. With complete disregard for the danger involved, Colonel Gabreski led his flight into protected covering fighters. He personally attacked and destroyed the leading enemy aircraft and, despite damage sustained by his airplane from contact with falling pieces of the disintegrating enemy plane, sought out and destroyed another enemy fighter before returning to join his flight for further escort of the bombers. Colonel Gabreski's outstanding and spirited aggressiveness and his heroic disregard for his personal safety in the face of superior enemy forces were an inspiration to his fellow pilots and reflect highest credit upon himself and the Armed Forces of the United States.

== Long Island Rail Road ==
Following his retirement from the Air Force, Gabreski worked for Grumman Aerospace until August 1978. He was asked by New York Governor Hugh Carey to serve as president of the financially stressed and state-owned Long Island Rail Road in an attempt to improve the commuter line. Carey was opposed in the Democratic gubernatorial primary election by his own lieutenant governor, Maryanne Krupsak, and in part appointed Gabreski to enhance his election campaign based on Gabreski's Polish extraction and Long Island affiliations.

After what he described as an 18-month struggle with the board of the Metropolitan Transportation Authority, Gabreski resigned on February 26, 1981. He charged that the creation of an executive director's position, and its appointee, obstructed his efforts to improve service, replace equipment, and change its executive staff. However, a severe heat wave in the summer of 1980 that overwhelmed the commuter line's air conditioning systems was apparently the final straw that forced his resignation.

== Personal life and death ==
Francis and Kay Gabreski had nine children in 48 years of marriage. Two of their three sons graduated from the United States Air Force Academy and became career Air Force pilots. His daughter-in-law Terry L. Gabreski was promoted to lieutenant general in August 2005, the highest-ranking woman in the USAF until her retirement in 2010. His wife died as the result of an automobile accident as they both were returning from the Oshkosh Air Show on August 6, 1993. She was interred in Calverton National Cemetery, 25 miles from their home in Dix Hills, Long Island, New York.

Gabreski died of an apparent heart attack in Huntington Hospital, on Long Island, on January 31, 2002, and is buried in Calverton National Cemetery. Gabreski's funeral on February 6 was with full military honors and included a missing man formation flyover by F-15E Strike Eagles from the 4th Fighter Wing, Seymour Johnson Air Force Base, North Carolina.

== Legacy ==
Suffolk County Air Force Base in Westhampton Beach, New York, which became Suffolk County Airport in 1969, was renamed Francis S. Gabreski Airport in 1991. The collocated New York Air National Guard installation at the airport was also renamed Francis S. Gabreski Air National Guard Base. In 1978, he was enshrined in the National Aviation Hall of Fame. Gabreski Road at Shaw AFB, SC, is named in his honor.

The Colonel Francis S. Gabreski squadron of the Civil Air Patrol located in Bellport, New York, is named in his honor.

Route 8 between Oil City and Franklin PA is named Francis S. Gabreski Highway in his honor.

== See also ==
- Richard Bong, Army Air Forces fighter pilot
- Emmett (Cyclone) Davis, Army Air Forces/U.S. Air Force fighter pilot
- George Andrew Davis, Jr., Army Air Forces/U.S. Air Force fighter pilot
- Joseph Foss, Marine Corps fighter pilot
- David McCampbell, Navy fighter pilot

| Preceded by Robert K. Pattison | President of Long Island Rail Road; 1978–1981 | Succeeded by Daniel T. Scannell |
