= Shaw Air Force Base =

US Air Force base at Sumter, South Carolina, United States

- Sumter, South Carolina in United States
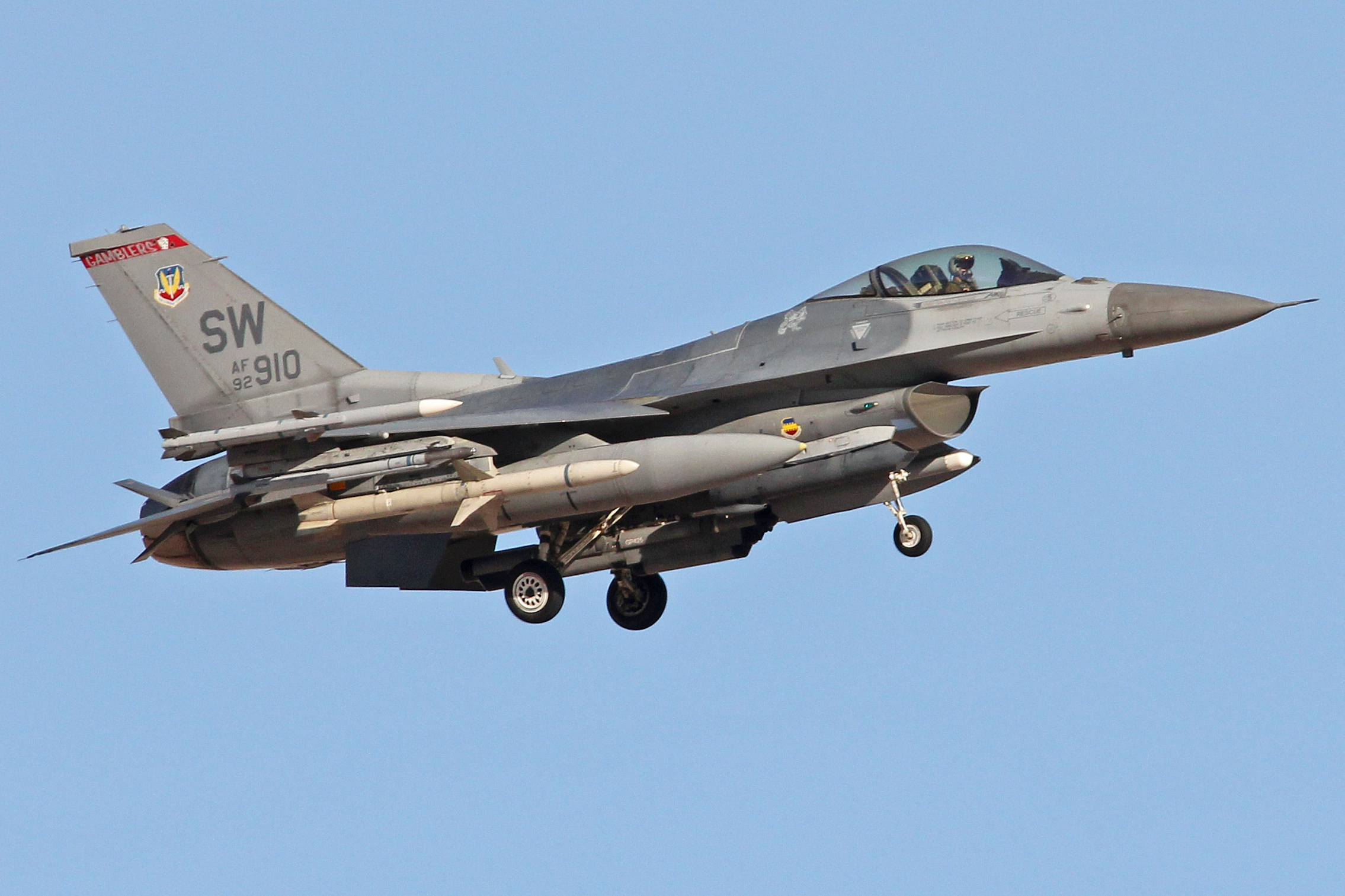
- A General Dynamics F-16 Fighting Falcon of the 77th Fighter Squadron, part of the 20th Fighter Wing based at Shaw AFB

Site information
- Type: US Air Force base
- Owner: Department of Defense
- Operator: US Air Force
- Controlled by: Air Combat Command (ACC)
- Condition: Operational
- Website: www.shaw.af.mil

Location
- Location within North America Location within North Atlantic Location within the United States Location within South Carolina
- Coordinates: 33°58′23″N 080°28′22″W

Site history
- Built: 1941 (as Shaw Field)
- In use: 1941 – present

Garrison information
- Current commander: Colonel Kevin D. Hicok
- Garrison: 20th Fighter Wing (Host)

Airfield information
- Identifiers: IATA: SSC, ICAO: KSSC, FAA LID: SSC, WMO: 747900
- Elevation: 73.4 metres (241 ft) AMSL
Runways
Direction	Length and surface
4L/22R	3,052.2 metres (10,014 ft) concrete
4R/22L	2,442.6 metres (8,014 ft) concrete

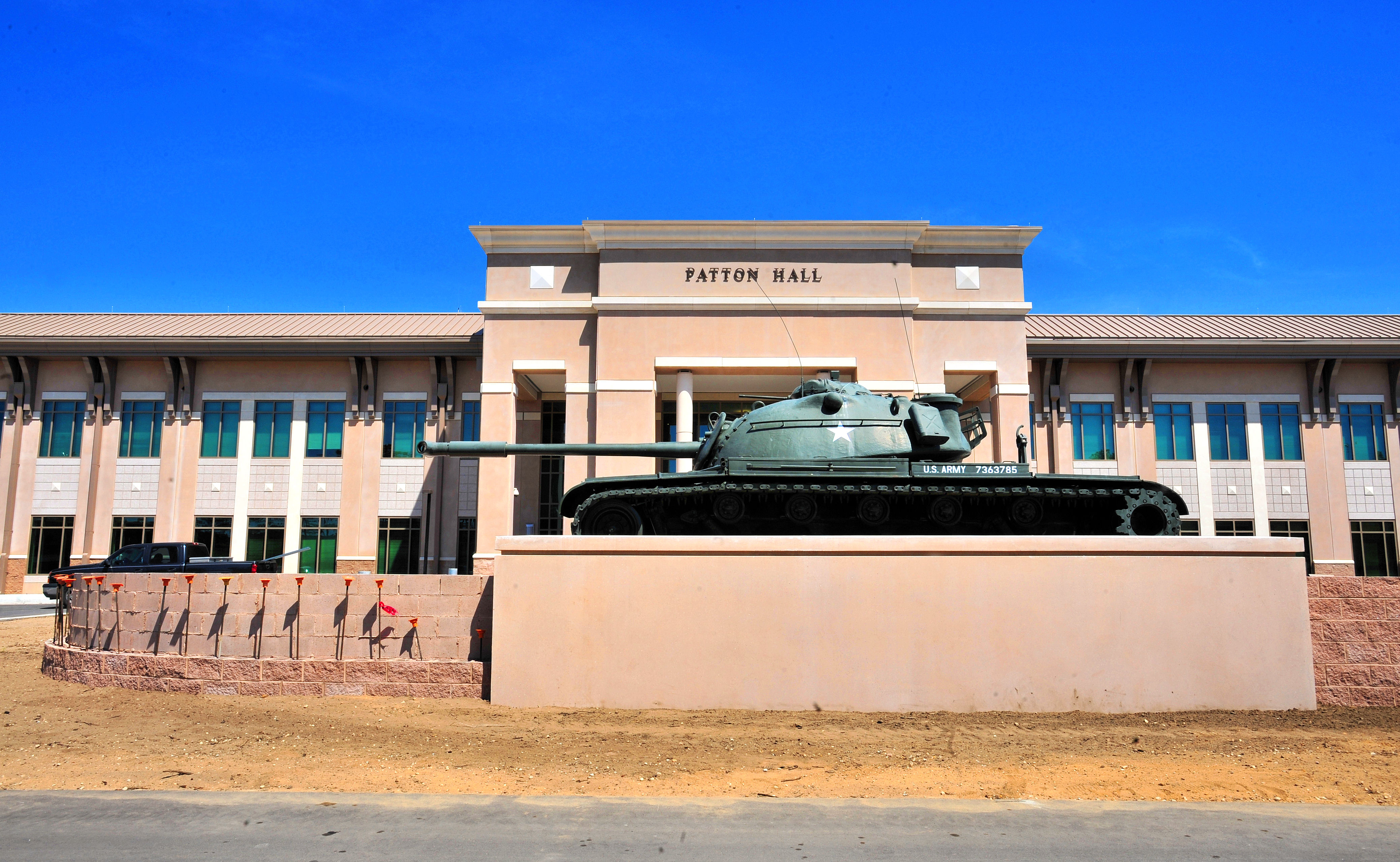
United States Third Army Headquarters, Patton Hall

Shaw Air Force Base (Shaw AFB) (IATA: SSC, ICAO: KSSC, FAA LID: SSC) is a United States Air Force (USAF) base located approximately 8.4 miles (13.5 km) west-northwest of downtown Sumter, South Carolina. It is one of the largest military bases operated by the United States, and is under the jurisdiction of USAF Air Combat Command (ACC). The 20th Fighter Wing (20th FW) is the host unit.

== History ==
=== Lt. Ervin David Shaw ===
The base is named in honor of World War I pilot 1st Lieutenant Ervin David Shaw. Lt. Shaw was one of the first Americans to fly combat missions in World War I. Shaw, a Sumter County native, was assigned to No. 48 Squadron of the Royal Air Force, as a member of the Royal Canadian Flying Corps. Shaw died after three enemy aircraft attacked his Bristol F.2B while he was returning from a reconnaissance mission on 9 July 1918. Shaw downed one of his attackers before he was killed.

=== World War II ===
Shaw Field was activated on 30 August 1941 and placed under the jurisdiction of the U.S. Army Air Corps Southeast Air Corps Training Center. The mission of the new airfield was a basic (Phase II) flying school to instruct air cadets in flying, and the Air Corps Basic Flying School was activated at the field on 26 June to operate the school. The airfield consisted of three 4,500-foot (1,400 m) runways and several auxiliary airfields.

- Shaw AAF Aux No. 1 – (Burnt Gin Airfield), Wedgefield, South Carolina 33°53′09″N 80°29′46″W
- Shaw AAF Aux No. 2 – (Rembert Airfield), Rembert, South Carolina 34°06′15″N 80°33′10″W
- Shaw AAF Aux No. 3 – (Monaghan Airfield), Sumter, South Carolina 33°51′30″N 80°23′10″W
- Shaw AAF Aux No. 4 – (Sumter Airfield), Sumter, South Carolina 33°56′00″N 80°22′00″W

Flying activities at the field began on 22 October 1941 using Vultee BT-13 Valiants. Enough construction was completed for the first group of cadets entered training 15 December 1941, and the first class completed training in February 1942. The concrete parking ramp was completed during May 1942.

In October 1942, the flight training was changed to Advanced (Phase III) flying training and AT-6 Texan single-engine and Beech AT-10 twin-engine trainers were used. During World War II, the U.S. Army Air Forces (USAAF) Pilot School, under the USAAF Southeast Training Center trained more than 8,600 pilots in the basic and advanced flying curriculum, its graduates were then sent to Advanced Flight Training in single or multi-engine aircraft.

On 1 April 1945 jurisdiction of Shaw Field was transferred to the First Air Force. The 139th Army Air Force Base Unit, I Fighter Command became the host unit. and pilots were sent to Shaw for fighter transition training in Republic P-47 Thunderbolt single-engined fighters.

For a brief time, Shaw Field also served as a prisoner-of-war (POW) camp. The first group of German POWs arrived on 1 March 1945. Eventually, 175 of them lived in an encampment just off the main base, on Peach Orchard Road (also known as South Carolina Highway 441) across from Shaw's (side) hospital (currently closed) gate and worked on local farms in the area. They departed in the early months of 1946 for the rebuilding of European cities and towns that were devastated during the war. Those prisoners were eventually repatriated to Germany around 1947, with some returning to the Shaw and Sumter area and obtaining their U.S. citizenship.

=== Postwar era ===
Shaw Army Airfield was designated a permanent USAAF installation after the war, being transferred to Continental Air Forces on 16 April 1945. After a period of reorganization, jurisdiction was transferred to Air Defense Command on 1 March 1946. From July 1946 until May 1947 Shaw was the home of the 414th and 415th Night Fighter Squadrons.

The squadrons flew the P-61 Black Widow in Europe with Ninth Air Force during World War II, and were reassigned back to the United States after the end of hostilities. The 414th was transferred to Caribbean Air Force at Río Hato Army Air Base, Panama in March 1947 to perform an air defense mission of the Panama Canal. The 415th was reassigned to Alaska Air Command at Adak Island, Alaska in May 1947 also to perform an air defense mission, over the Aleutian Islands and the territorial waters of western Alaska.

=== United States Air Force ===
==== 20th Fighter Group ====
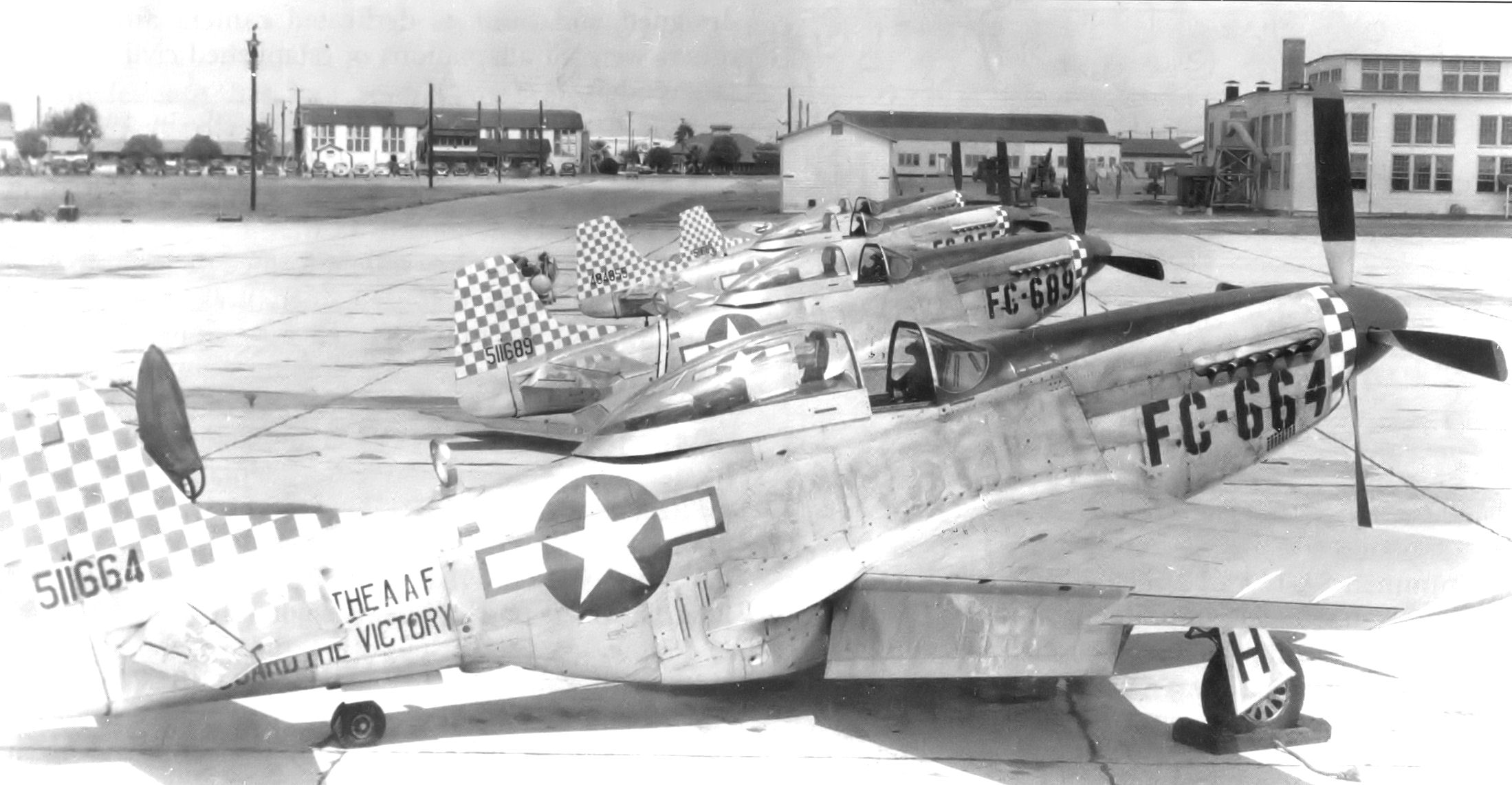
20th Fighter Group P-51D Mustangs parked at Shaw Field, November 1946. Serials identified are 45-11665, 45-11689, and 44-84855. Note the postwar "buzz number" on the fuselage along with the AAF Wartime fuselage marking and checkered wartime paint at the cowling and tail.

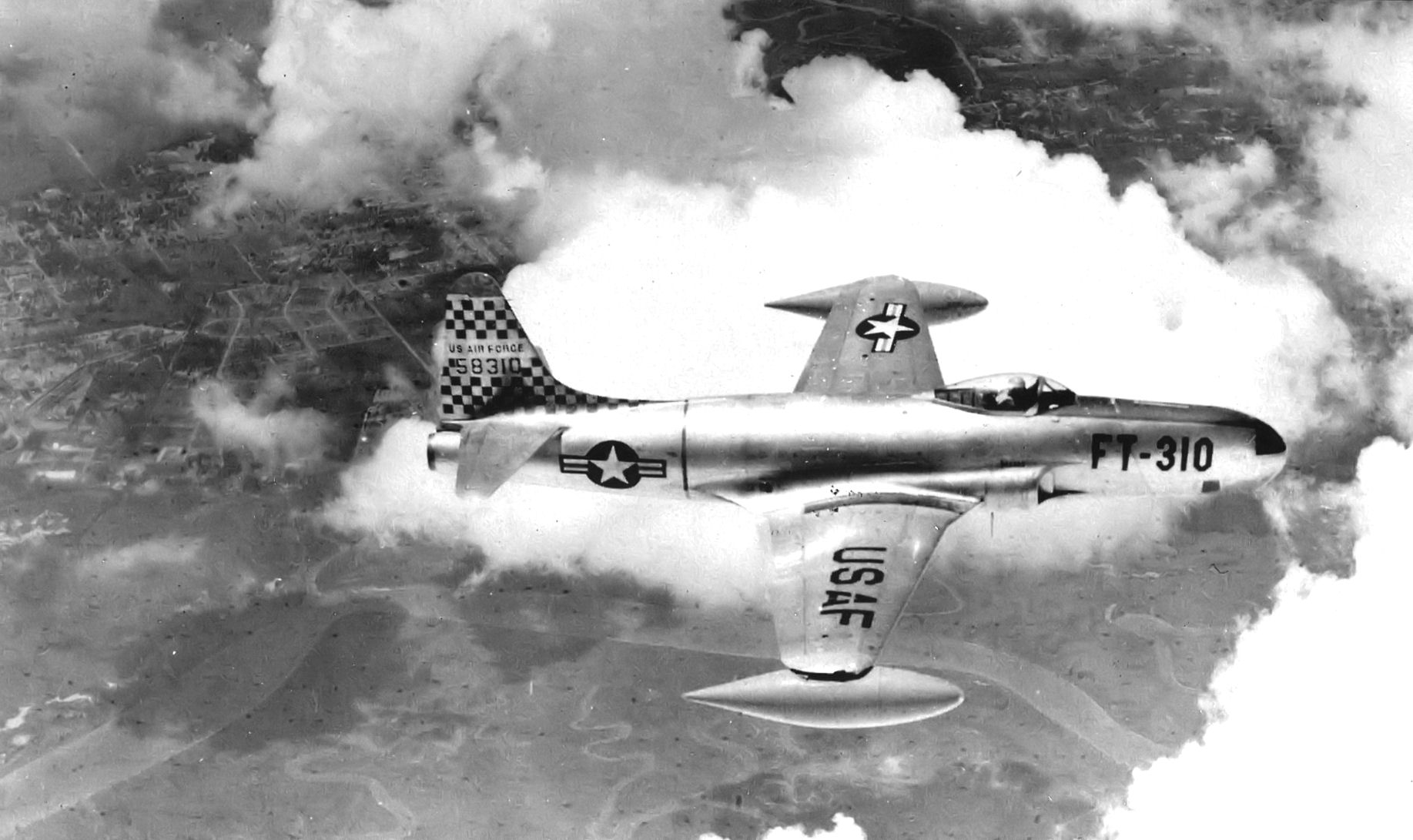
161st Tactical Reconnaissance Squadron Lockheed RF-80A-5-LO Shooting Star, 45-8310, Shaw AFB, 1950

Jurisdiction of Shaw was again transferred to Tactical Air Command (TAC) on 23 March 1946. The 20th Fighter Group was reassigned to Shaw on 20 October 1946 from Biggs Army Airfield, Texas which was transferred to Strategic Air Command. The 20th FG came under Ninth Air Force.

After the establishment of the United States Air Force (USAF) as a separate military branch in September 1947, Shaw Army Airfield was renamed Shaw Air Force Base, on 13 January 1948 and the 20th Fighter-Bomber Wing was activated on 15 August 1947 with the implementation of the Hobson Plan.

The 20th Fighter Group was first equipped with North American P-51D, then exchanged its P-51's in February 1948 for F-84B Thunderjets, the first TAC group to receive operational F-84s. The group was composed of the 55th, 77th and 79th Fighter Squadrons. The F-84s began arriving in February 1948 and ran through May when the full complement was received. Nine were lost in accidents before the remainder were returned to Republic Aviation in May 1949 in exchange for F-84D models. Control over the wing changed hands on 1 February 1949 with its assignment to Fourteenth Air Force.

On 23 September 1949 the 161st Tactical Reconnaissance Squadron was transferred to the 20th from the 363d Tactical Reconnaissance Wing at Langley AFB Virginia. The 161st flew the Lockheed RF-80A reconnaissance version of the F-80 Shooting Star. A reduction in USAF units in April 1949 led to a consolidation of units at fewer bases. With the outbreak of the Korean War in 1950, the mission of the 161st was to train replacement reconnaissance aircraft pilots. The 161st TFS became the nucleus on which the 363rd Tactical Reconnaissance Wing's mission at Shaw when the wing transferred there in 1951.

The 20th Fighter Group was reassigned to Langley AFB, Virginia on 1 December 1951 in preparation for a permanent overseas deployment to RAF Wethersfield, England to support NATO.

==== 363d Tactical Reconnaissance Wing ====
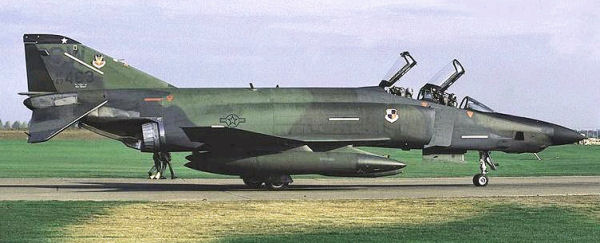
McDonnell RF-4C-34-MC Phantom II, AF Serial No. 67-0436, of the 16th Tactical Reconnaissance Squadron, October 1986. Note the NATO European camouflage schema, "SW" tail code and low visibility USAF markings. This was one of the last RF-4Cs flown by the 363d TFW before their retirement in 1989.

On 1 April 1951, the 363d Tactical Reconnaissance Wing was transferred to Shaw from Langley Air Force Base, Virginia. The 363d Tactical Reconnaissance Wing would remain at Shaw, under various designations, for the next 43 years. The wing's mission was to fly photographic, electronic and electronic intelligence missions to support both air and ground operations by American or Allied ground forces through its operational component, the 363d Tactical Reconnaissance Group. In addition, the 363d provided combat crew training for reconnaissance aircrews.

In addition to the 363 TRW, Headquarters Ninth Air Force was transferred to Shaw from Pope Air Force Base, North Carolina on 1 September 1954. During the tenure of the 363d Tactical Reconnaissance Wing at Shaw AFB (1951–1993), the wing was the first USAF operational unit equipped with the following aircraft:

- Martin RB-57A Canberra
- Douglas RB-66 Destroyer
- McDonnell RF-101 Voodoo
- McDonnell Douglas RF-4C Phantom II

Over the next four decades, the squadrons under the 363 TRW changed frequently. Nearly all tactical reconnaissance aircraft aircrews in the United States Air Force were trained or stationed at Shaw Air Force Base.

===== 432d Tactical Reconnaissance Wing =====
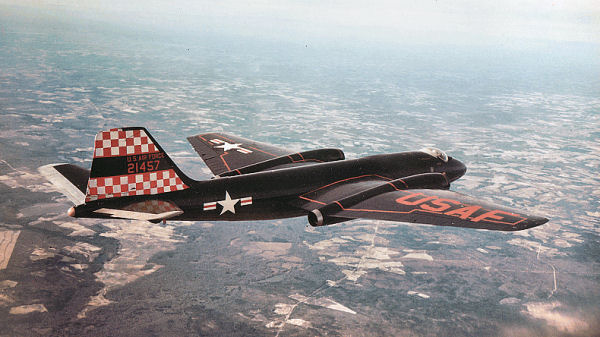
Martin RB-57A-MA, AF Serial No. 52-1457 of the 43d Tactical Reconnaissance Squadron. This aircraft is currently on static display at the Museum of Aviation, Robins AFB, Georgia.

On 23 March 1953, the 432d Tactical Reconnaissance Group was re-activated at Shaw. The group's mission at Shaw AFB was to assume the reconnaissance training mission that was handled previously by the 363d TRW. When elevated to the 432d Tactical Reconnaissance Wing on 8 February 1958, the wing operated the USAF Advanced Flying Training School, Tactical Reconnaissance. The 432d TRW and 363d TRW both were under the 837th Air Division, headquartered at Shaw.

The group initially conducted training with two squadrons (20th, 29th) flying the Republic RF-84F "Thunderflash" and two squadrons (41st, 43d) flying the Martin RB-57A "Canberra". In 1957, the group upgraded the 20th and 29th to the McDonnell RF-101C "Voodoo", and the 41st and 43d transitioned to the electronic warfare EB-66C Destroyer.

In a budgetary move, the 432d TRW was inactivated on 8 April 1959. The RF-101C equipped 17th and 18th TRSs were deployed to NATO, being reassigned to the 66th Tactical Reconnaissance Wing at Laon-Couvron Air Base, France.

===== 4411th Combat Crew Training Group =====
The Shaw reconnaissance training mission was taken over by the 4411th Combat Crew Training Group, consisting of RF-101C and EB-66C aircraft. The 4411 CCTG became an operational group under the 363d TRW and continued the training mission at Shaw for reconnaissance aircraft until both it and the 837th Air Division were inactivated on 1 February 1963. All assets from these organizations were then transferred to the 363d TFW.

===== 66th Tactical Reconnaissance Wing =====
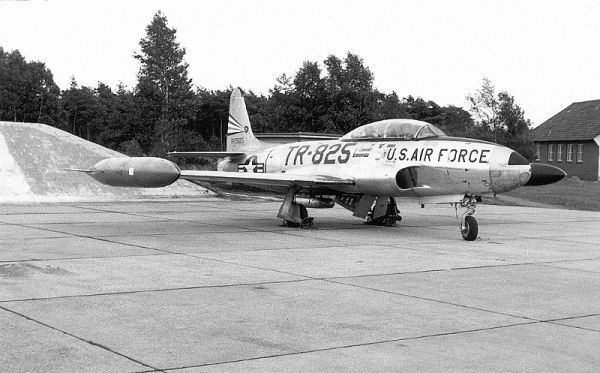
Lockheed F/RF-80C-10-LO Shooting Star, 49-1825, of the 366th Tactical Reconnaissance Wing, shown at Sembach Air Base, West Germany after the wing's departure to NATO in 1953

On 1 January 1953 the 66th Tactical Reconnaissance Wing was activated at Shaw, replacing the 118th Tactical Reconnaissance Wing, the title of which reverted to the Tennessee Air National Guard after World War II, where the 66th Fighter Group served in the European theater as part of Eighth Air Force. The 66th Reconnaissance (later, Strategic Reconnaissance) Group, was a part of Strategic Air Command (SAC) from July 1947 – May 1951, at Barksdale AFB, Louisiana as an Air Force Reserve corollary unit under the guidance of active duty units in order to train and maintain currency in reconnaissance operations for its reserve personnel.

The 66 TRW was formed at Shaw from the RB-26 assets of the 18 TRS and RF-80s transferred from South Korea. Wing and squadrons trained at Shaw prior to deployment to NATO. The 66th had three operational squadrons: the 30th, 302d and 303d TRS. The 30 TRS flew the RB-26 Invader, equipped for night reconnaissance, while the 302d and 303d flew the RF-80A Shooting Star for day reconnaissance.

On 25 June 1953, the 66 TRW departed Shaw, being reassigned to Sembach Air Base, West Germany. Just prior to the wing's deployment to NATO, the 303 TRS was reequipped with RF-80As.

==== 363d Fighter Wing ====
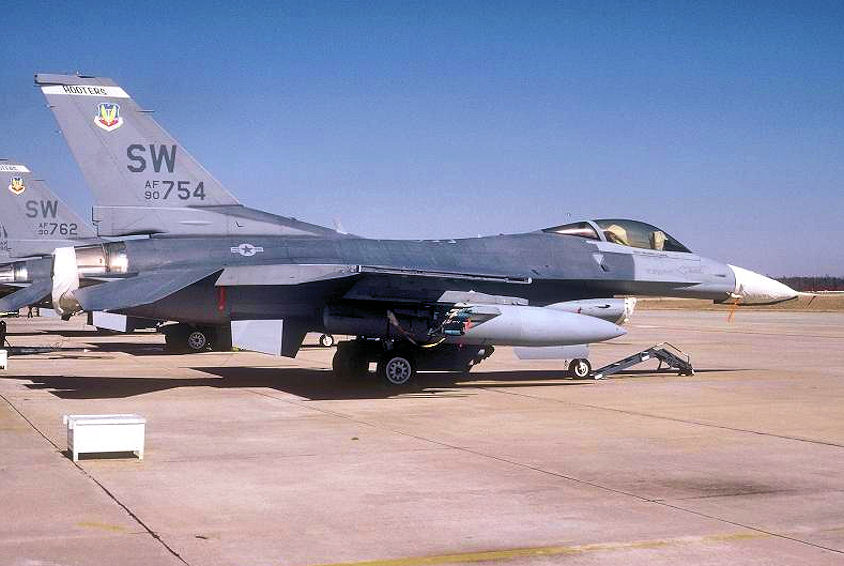
F-16C Block 42J Fighting Falcon, 90-754, of the 17th Fighter Squadron. After the squadron was inactivated on 31 December 1993, this aircraft was transferred to Luke AFB, Arizona where it has been used in F-16 pilot training, today being assigned to the 310th Fighter Squadron, 56th Operations Group.

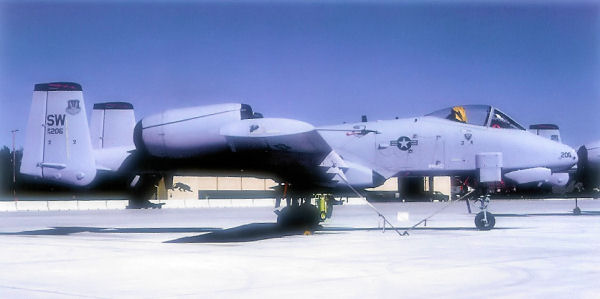
Fairchild Republic A-10A Thunderbolt II, AF Serial No. 79-0206, of the 21st Fighter Squadron, 29 September 1993

By 1980, the advent of reconnaissance satellites made the need for tactical aircraft reconnaissance less and less necessary. The aging and phaseout of the 1960s-era RF-4C aircraft fleet and the utility of the Lockheed TR-1 in Europe for tactical reconnaissance led to the decision by the USAF to realign the mission of the 363rd TRW. The reconnaissance training mission of the wing was terminated in 1981 and beginning in 1982, the wing would become 363d Tactical Fighter Wing (363d TFW), being equipped with General Dynamics F-16 fighter aircraft. On 1 October 1981, the 363 TRW was re-designated .

The 363 TFW received its first F-16 on 26 March 1982. The 363 TFW flew F-16A/B Block 10 aircraft until 1984 then converted to Block 15s; F-16C/D Block 25s in autumn 1985 and Block 42s in late 1991. All aircraft carried the "SW" Tail Code.

On 9 August 1990, the 17 TFS and 33 TFS of 363 TFW became the first F-16 squadrons to deploy to the United Arab Emirates in Operation Desert Shield. Operating from Al Dhafra Air Base as the 363d Tactical Fighter Wing (Provisional), along with the 10 TFS from the 50 TFW, Hahn Air Base, Germany. The wing flew combat missions to Iraq and Kuwait during Operation Desert Storm between 17 January and 28 February 1991.

Following Desert Storm, the 19th and 33d Tactical Fighter Squadrons deployed to the Persian Gulf in support of Operation Southern Watch, a coalition effort to enforce the Iraqi No-fly zone south of the 32nd parallel north. The 33 TFS made history when one of its pilots downed an Iraqi aircraft with an AIM-120 AMRAAM missile. The incident marked the first time an AIM-120 was fired in combat and was the first U.S. F-16 air-to-air kill.

With the closure of Myrtle Beach Air Force Base South Carolina and the inactivation of the 354th Fighter Wing, the 21st Tactical Fighter Squadron was activated at Shaw and received 30 Republic A/OA-10 Thunderbolt IIs from the inactivating 355th Fighter Squadron on 1 April 1992. All A-10 aircraft with the 21 TFS were designated as OA-10A.

As a result of the August 1992 destruction of Homestead AFB Florida by Hurricane Andrew in September 1992, the 31st Fighter Wing's 309th Fighter Squadron was initially evacuated to Shaw AFB prior to the hurricane making landfall. With Homestead unusable for an extended period after the hurricane, on 1 October 1992 the squadron was permanently assigned to the 363 FW.

The 363rd Fighter Wing was inactivated at Shaw AFB on 31 December 1993. The next day, 1 January 1994, the 20th Fighter Wing inactivated at RAF Upper Heyford and reactivated without personnel or equipment at Shaw AFB, returning to the base it had left for duty with NATO forty-one years earlier.

==== 20th Fighter Wing ====
As a result of the end of the Cold War, the USAF made several dramatic changes with the inactivation and re-designation of wings and their units. A significant reduction in forces in Europe was made in the early 1990s, which reflected the changes in Europe after fall of the Berlin Wall.

On 15 December 1993, the flight line at RAF Upper Heyford, England was closed and the host unit, the 20th Fighter Wing, was transferred from USAFE to Air Combat Command. The 20th was reassigned to Shaw AFB, replacing the 363d Fighter Wing as part of the USAF heritage program, which kept senior units on active duty and inactivated newer ones.

Upon activation at Shaw, the 20 FW assumed the personnel and equipment of the inactivated 363 FW. The operational squadrons of the 363d Operations Group were assigned to the 20th Operations Group and re-designated as follows:

- 17th Fighter Squadron -> 77th Fighter Squadron (F-16C/D)
- 19th Fighter Squadron -> 78th Fighter Squadron (F-16C/D)
- 21st Fighter Squadron -> 55th Fighter Squadron (OA-10A)
- 309th Fighter Squadron -> 79th Fighter Squadron (F-16C/D)

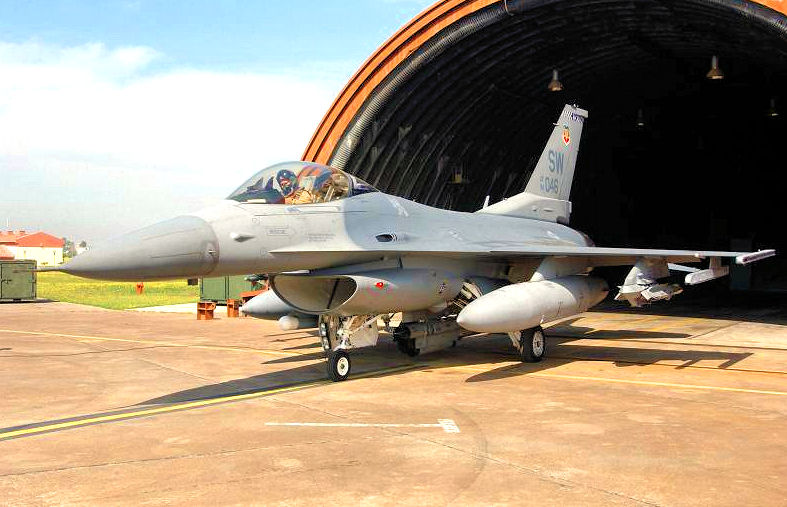
77th FS F-16C Block 50, 94–0046, at Incirlik AB, Turkey, 12 April 2003 after Operation Iraqi Freedom

Since moving to Shaw in 1994 the 20th has taken part and continues to take part in numerous operations. In September 1994 the 20 FW provided fighter cover for US operations in Haiti during Operation Uphold Democracy. This operation restored democratically elected President Jean-Bertrand Aristide who had been ousted in September 1991 by military forces within Haiti.

The wing was called to send F-16s in support of NATO operations during the Kosovo War in April 1999. On 4 May 1999 an F-16, 91–0353, from the 78th Expeditionary Fighter Squadron flying out of Aviano Air Base, Italy, shot down a Yugoslavian MiG-29 (aircraft number 109). On 10 June 1999 NATO air operations were suspended.

Throughout the 1990s the 20 FW routinely rotated squadrons to enforce the no-fly zones over Iraq. Southern Watch began in August 1992 and ended with the invasion of Iraq in 2003. 20 FW squadrons rotated in and out of the Middle East to support enforcement of the no-fly zone. The 20th routinely sent squadrons to Incirlik Air Base, Turkey supporting the no-fly zone in northern Iraq between January 1997 and March 2003.

After the September 11 attacks on the World Trade Center and the Pentagon in 2001, the U.S. Defense Department developed Noble Eagle to protect US soil in the war on terrorism. The 20 FW has been tasked with providing patrols over New York City, Washington, DC and any other location the wing is called upon to protect. In addition to Noble Eagle tasking the 20th provides fighter cover for the President of the United States when traveling and at Camp David.

In February 2003 the 20 FW deployed approximately 1,300 service members and 15 aircraft to the 363 AEW at Prince Sultan AB, Saudi Arabia, attached to the provisional CENTAF 363d Air Expeditionary Wing. This deployment was part of Operation Iraqi Freedom (OIF), the United States actions for the removal of Saddam Hussein from power in Iraq. In May 2008 the 77 FS deployed its aircraft and airmen along with maintainers from the 20 MXG to Joint Base Balad, where they conducted operations until relieved by the 55 FS in October 2008. The 55th carried out operations in Iraq until January 2009.

During 2009 the three squadrons concentrated on regaining aircrew skill sets that atrophy during a combat deployment, in preparation for the next round of deployments. During 2010 the 55th and 77th once again fought in Iraq. The 77 FS again was the lead 20 FW unit deploying to Joint Base Balad, Iraq in January 2010. The 77th carried out operations there until relieved by the 55 FS in May 2010. The 55th finished its tour in Iraq in October 2010.

The wing has been called to send both personnel and aircraft in support of operations in Afghanistan. One such deployment was in January 2007 when 150 airmen deployed as part of an Air Expeditionary Force. During the October 2009 to February 2010 the 79 FS deployed its aircraft and airmen along with maintainers from the 20 MXG to Bagram AB, Afghanistan.

==== Third US Army ====
Emblem of the United States Third Army

In its 2005 Base Realignment and Closure Commission Recommendations, DoD recommended to relocate the Third US Army Headquarters from Fort Gillem and Fort McPherson, Georgia, to Shaw AFB as a tenant unit on the base. This was a portion of a larger recommendation that would close Fort Gillem and Fort McPherson.

On 1 June 2011, Third Army Headquarters at Shaw, Patton Hall, was dedicated during a ribbon cutting ceremony for their new headquarters. Third Army continued the transfer of its personnel and equipment in order to be fully operational at Shaw AFB by 15 June 2011. An estimated 3,000 people relocated to the Sumter area, including families. This includes approximately 1,200 service members, who will be working out of the $100 million, 320,000-square-foot (30,000 m^{2}) command and control facility. The new Patton Hall took 22 months to build, has 42 conference rooms, a 200-seat auditorium and can support up to 1,500 personnel.

== Major commands to which assigned ==
- Southeast Air Corps Training Center, 26 June 1941

Redesignated: AAF Southeast Training Center, 29 October 1942
Redesignated: Army Air Forces Eastern Flying Training Command, 31 July 1943

- First Air Force, 1 April 1945
- Continental Air Forces, 16 April 1945
- Air Defense Command, 1 March 1946
- Tactical Air Command, 23 March 1946
- Continental Air Command, 1 December 1948
- Tactical Air Command, 1 December 1950
- Air Combat Command, 1 June 1992 – present

=== Major units assigned ===
- 77th Air Base Squadron, 1 August 1941 – 10 July 1942

Redesignated: 77th Base HQ and Air Base Squadron
10 July 1942 – 20 April 1944

- 2142d AAF Base Unit, 30 April 1944 – 31 March 1945
- 139th AAF Base Unit, 31 March 1945 – 31 March 1946
- 67th Reconnaissance Group, 11 February 1946 – 31 March 1946
- 316th AAF Base Unit, 31 March 1946 – 25 August 1948
- 20th Fighter Group (later Wing)

20 October 1946 – 1 December 1951; 1 January 1994 – present

- 161st (later 18th) Tactical Reconnaissance Squadron

23 September 1949 – 25 May 1959

- 437th Troop Carrier Wing, 1 August 1950 – 16 October 1950
- 363d Tactical Reconnaissance Wing (later Tactical Fighter), 6 November 1951 – 31 December 1993
- 66th Tactical Reconnaissance Wing, 1 January 1953 – 25 June 1953
- 432d Tactical Reconnaissance Group (later Wing), 18 March 1954 – 18 June 1959
- Ninth Air Force (later dual-hatted as US Air Forces Central), 20 August 1954 – present
- 837th Air Division, 8 February 1958 – 1 February 1963
- 4411th Combat Crew Training Group, 8 April 1959 – 15 June 1969
- 4416th Test Squadron, 15 June 1963 – 1 May 1970
- 682nd Air Support Operations Squadron, 1 December 1971 – 15 June 2011

== Role and operations ==
Today the 20th Fighter Wing remains at Shaw. As the host wing, it also retains the responsibility for providing facilities, personnel and material for the base's operation. Major components of the 20 FW are:

- 20th Operations Group (20 OG) (Tail Code "SW")

The 20th Operations Group employs approximately 80 F-16CJ fighter aircraft in conventional and anti-radiation suppression of enemy air defenses (SEAD), strategic attack, counter-air, air interdiction, joint maritime operations and combat search-and-rescue missions.

- 20th Maintenance Group

The 20th Maintenance Group includes the 20th Aircraft Maintenance Squadron, the 20th Component Maintenance Squadron, the 20th Equipment Maintenance Squadron and the 20th Maintenance Operations Squadron.

- 20th Mission Support Group

The 20th Mission Support Group supports more than 5,400 military and civilian employees and 11,000 family members. The 20 MSG is also responsible for thousands of acres of land, including the 24-acre (9.7 ha) outdoor recreation area located 37 miles (60 km) northwest on Lake Wateree, and the approximately 12,000-acre (49 km^{2}) Poinsett Electronic Combat Range located about 10 miles (16 km) southwest of the base.

- 20th Medical Group

The 20th Medical Group provide ambulatory medical and dental services to the 20th Fighter Wing, Headquarters 9th Air Force and associate units. It is an outpatient clinic with 24-hour 911 Emergency Medical Services (EMS), advanced life support (ALS) ambulance response and transport capability for base personnel and flight line operations.

Tenant units located on Shaw AFB are:

- Headquarters Ninth Air Force (9 AF)
- United States Air Forces Central (USAFCENT), the air component of United States Central Command (arrived 20 August 1954).
- Detachment 1, 609th Air and Space Operations Center (609 AOC)
- United States Army Central (USARCENT), the United States Army Component of United States Central Command.

Substantial military contracting occurs through Shaw AFB. In fiscal year 2020, for example, the following corporate activities occurred at the Air Force Base:

- Abacus Technology Corp. information technology sustainment.
- CAE USA aircrew training and courseware development for F-15E, F-16, and F-22A aircraft.
- CACI information technology at the Network Operations and Security Center (NOSC) on Shaw AFB, with a focus on Central Command.
- Kapsuun Group LLC support services for A4/A6 staff.
- SAIC infrastructure engineering and technical modeling support, weapon system mission data analysis, and precision fires manager engineering and analysis.
- SAIC live virtual modeling and simulation for U.S. Army Central.
- Titan Facility Services LLC medical housekeeping, waste management and linen management.

In July 2020, Bristol General Contractors LLC of Anchorage, Alaska, was contracted to build a Mission Training Complex on the base, with construction expected finished by May 2022.

== Based units ==
Flying and notable non-flying units based at Shaw Air Force Base.

Units marked GSU are Geographically Separate Units, which although based at Shaw, are subordinate to a parent unit based at another location.

=== United States Air Force ===
Air Combat Command (ACC)

- Ninth Air Force (US Air Forces Central Command)
  - Headquarters Ninth Air Force (US Air Forces Central Command)
  - 609th Air Operations Center
    - 609th Air Support Squadron
    - 727th Expeditionary Air Control Squadron
- Fifteenth Air Force
  - Headquarters Fifteenth Air Force
  - 20th Fighter Wing (host wing)
    - Headquarters 20th Fighter Wing
    - 20th Operations Group
      - 20th Operations Support Squadron
      - 55th Fighter Squadron – F-16C/D Fighting Falcon
      - 77th Fighter Squadron – F-16C/D Fighting Falcon
      - 79th Fighter Squadron – F-16C/D Fighting Falcon
    - 20th Maintenance Group
      - 55th Fighter Generation Squadron – F-16C/D Fighting Falcon
      - 77th Fighter Generation Squadron – F-16C/D Fighting Falcon
      - 79th Fighter Generation Squadron – F-16C/D Fighting Falcon
      - 20th Maintenance Operations Squadron
      - 20th Component Maintenance Squadron
      - 20th Equipment Maintenance Squadron
    - 20th Medical Group
      - 20th Operational Medical Readiness Squadron
      - 20th Health Care Operations Squadron
    - 20th Mission Support Group
      - 20th Civil Engineer Squadron
      - 20th Communications Squadron
      - 20th Contracting Squadron
      - 20th Force Support Squadron
      - 20th Logistics Readiness Squadron
      - 20th Security Forces Squadron
  - 25th Attack Wing
    - 25th Operational Support Squadron
    - 50th Attack Squadron – MQ-9A Reaper
    - 482nd Attack Squadron – MQ-9A Reaper
  - 495th Fighter Group
    - Headquarters 495th Fighter Group
- Sixteenth Air Force
  - 363rd Intelligence, Surveillance, and Reconnaissance Wing
    - 365th Intelligence, Surveillance and Reconnaissance Group
      - 51st Intelligence Squadron (GSU)
  - 557th Weather Wing
    - 1st Weather Group
      - 28th Operational Weather Squadron (GSU)

=== United States Army ===
US Army Central (ARCENT)

- Headquarters US Army Central (ARCENT)

== See also ==
- 20th Fighter Group (World War II)
- South Carolina World War II Army Airfields
- 27th Flying Training Wing (World War II)
- 609th Information Warfare Squadron
