= 837th Air Division =

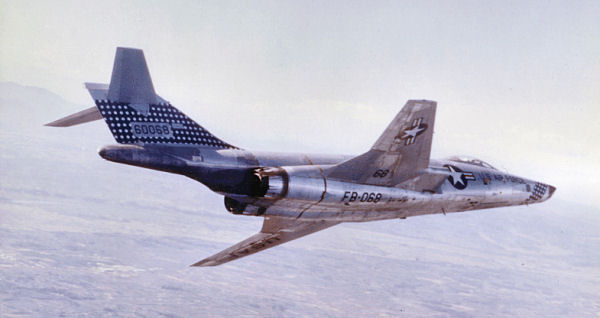
- RF-101 Voodoo of the 363d Tactical Reconnaissance Wing at Shaw AFB (Note: Aircraft is McDonnell RF-101C-65-MC Voodoo, serial 56-068. Now on display at Keesler AFB Air Park. Baugher, Joe (19 May 2023). "1956 USAF Serial Numbers". Joe Baugher.)
- Active: 1958–1963
- Country: United States
- Branch: United States Air Force
- Role: Command of tactical reconnaissance forces

Insignia
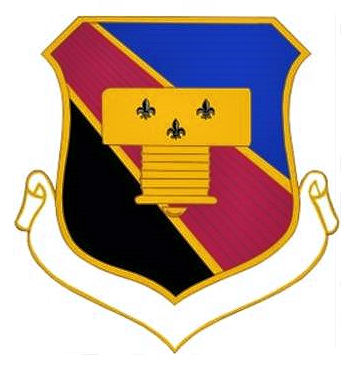
- 837th Air Division emblem (Note: Approved 4 August 1958. Description: Per bend azure and sable, a ray of ten segments gules, issuing from dexter chief to sinister base fimbriated or; overall an aerial camera of the last [color mentioned] bearing at honor three fleurs de lis, two and one, of the second [color mentioned] all within a diminished border of the fourth [color mentioned].)

The 837th Air Division is an inactive United States Air Force organization. Its last assignment was with Tactical Air Command's Ninth Air Force at Shaw Air Force Base, South Carolina where it was inactivated on 1 February 1963.

The division was activated in February 1958 as the headquarters for the 363d and 432d Tactical Reconnaissance Wings at Shaw. It was also responsible for the Air Force's Advanced Tactical Reconnaissance Flying Training School, which was managed by the 432d Wing until the wing was inactivated in June 1959, then by the 4411th Combat Crew Training Group.

During the Cuban Missile Crisis in 1962, the division deployed most of its 363d Wing to MacDill Air Force Base, Florida, from which it conducted low altitude reconnaissance missions over harbors and military sites in Cuba. Shortly after the end of the crisis, in February 1963, the division was inactivated and its resources transferred to the USAF Tactical Air Reconnaissance Center, which was simultaneously activated at Shaw.

== History ==
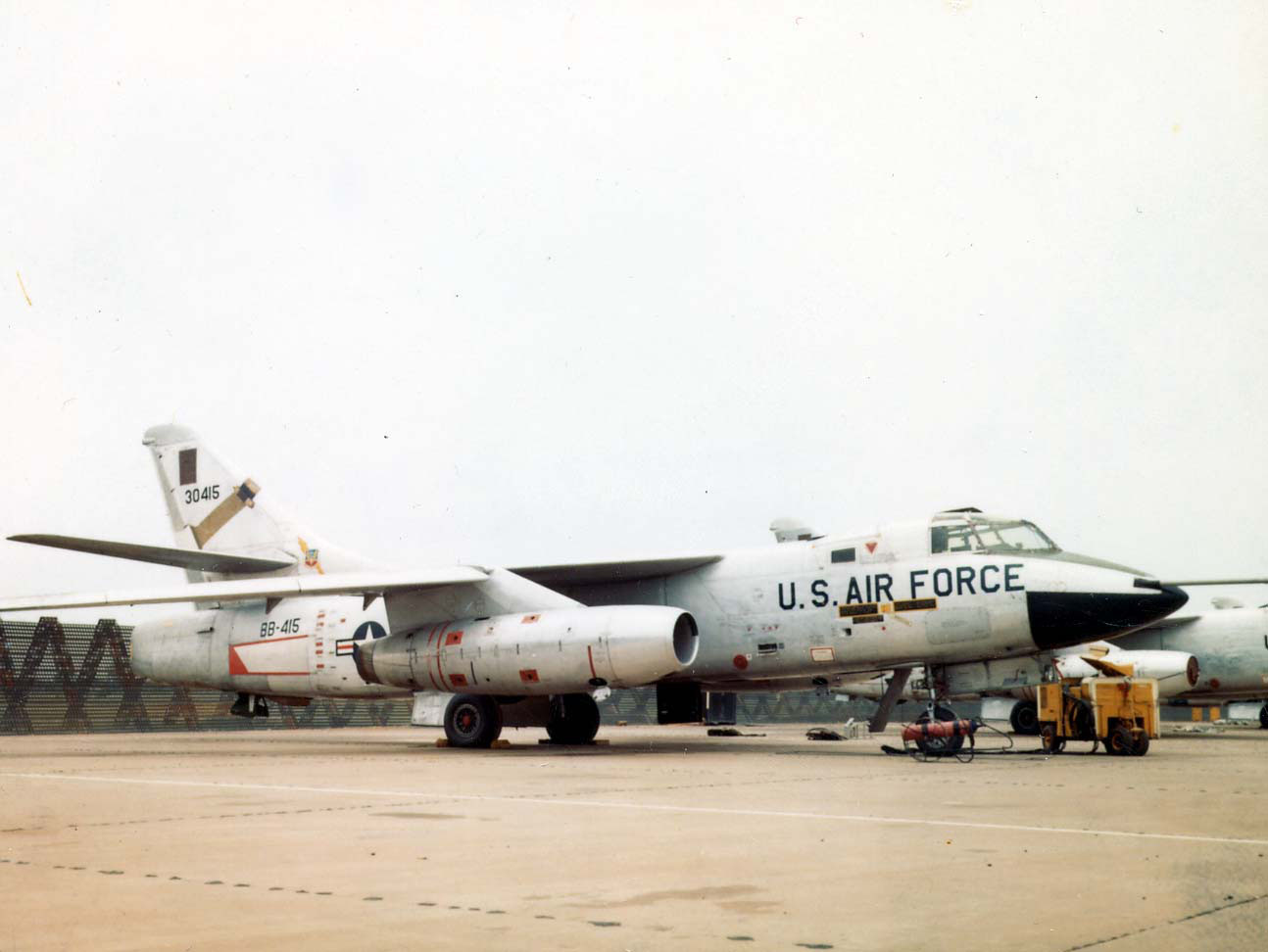
RB-66B Destroyer (Note: Aircraft is Douglas RB-66B-DL serial 53-415. This plane crashed on a night air refueling mission on 24 June 1969. Baugher, Joe (5 August 2023). "1953 USAF Serial Numbers". Joe Baugher.)

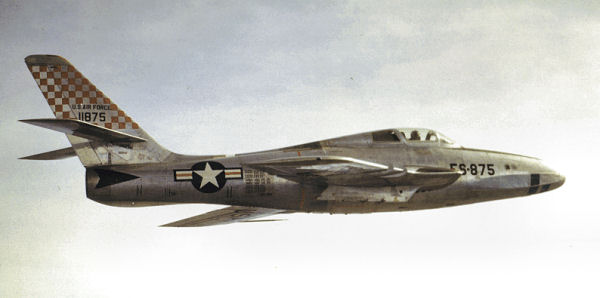
363 Tac Recce Wing RF-84F at Shaw AFB (Note: Aircraft is Republic RF-84F-10-RE Thunderflash, serial 51-1875. This plane crashed near Wright-Patterson AFB Baugher, Joe (13 August 2023). "1951 USAF Serial Numbers". Joe Baugher.)

The 837th Air Division was activated at Shaw Air Force Base on 9 February 1958 when the 432d Tactical Reconnaissance Wing was activated as Tactical Air Command (TAC)'s second tactical reconnaissance wing there. (Note: The 432d Wing's 432d Tactical Reconnaissance Group had been at Shaw since March 1954. Maurer, Combat Units, p. 302.) The 432d joined the 363d Tactical Reconnaissance Wing, which had been at Shaw since April 1951. The two wings were equipped with a variety of reconnaissance aircraft including both WB-66 and RB-66 Destroyers, Republic RF-84F Thunderflash aircraft and McDonnell RF-101 Voodoos. The division's 837th Air Base Group absorbed the resources of the inactivating 363d Air Base Group and became the host unit for active duty United States Air Force units stationed at Shaw. Brigadier General Mack, the commander of the 363d Wing, became the first commander of the division. The division's units performed visual, photographic, electronic, and weather reconnaissance.

In March 1958, the Air Force's advanced tactical reconnaissance school was assigned to the division, but was operated by the 432d Wing. The 4411th Combat Crew Training Group was organized and assigned to the division on 8 April 1959 and began preparations to manage the advanced flying school. In June, the 432d Wing was inactivated and the 4411th Group assumed command of the school from the division.

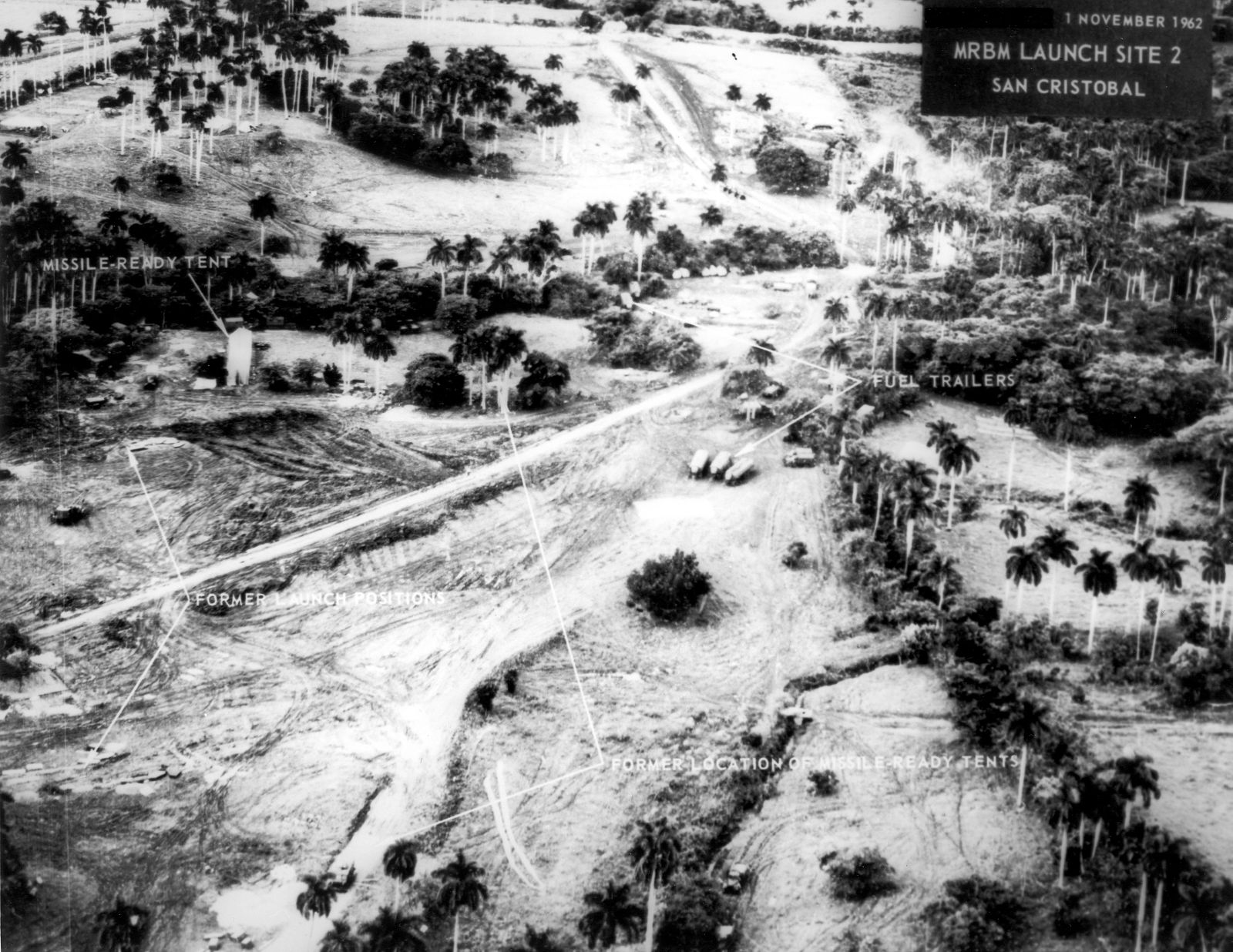
363d Wing reconnaissance photo of a missile launch site in Cuba

Before President Kennedy announced the presence of Soviet intermediate-range ballistic missiles in Cuba, the division and its 363d wing were notified of the high altitude reconnaissance missions by Lockheed U-2 aircraft of Strategic Air Command, which had indicated the construction of missile sites in Cuba, and began preparing target materials for possible low-level reconnaissance flights over the island. On 21 October 1962, the 363d Wing deployed RB-66s and RF-101s to MacDill Air Force Base, Florida, along with photographic interpreters and equipment from its 363d Reconnaissance Technical Squadron. For three weeks, beginning on 26 October, the wing conducted an intensive low level reconnaissance campaign over Cuba to detect missiles and short range Soviet Ilyushin Il-28 bombers. These sorties also provided the first evidence of a buildup of air defenses in Cuba when it detected SA-2 surface-to-air missiles.

The division was inactivated in February 1963 and its personnel formed the cadre for the USAF Tactical Air Reconnaissance Center, which was activated at Shaw the same day. The 4411th Combat Crew Training Group and the 363d Tactical Reconnaissance Wing were assigned to the new center. Brigadier General Aynesworth, the division commander, became the commander of the center.

== Lineage ==
- Established as the 837 Air Division on 16 January 1958

Activated on 8 February 1958
Discontinued and inactivated on 1 February 1963

=== Assignments ===
- Ninth Air Force, 8 February 1958 – 1 February 1963

=== Stations ===
- Shaw Air Force Base, South Carolina, 8 February 1958 – 1 February 1963

=== Components ===
Wings

- 363d Tactical Reconnaissance Wing: 8 February 1958 – 1 February 1963
- 432d Tactical Reconnaissance Wing: 8 February 1958 – 18 June 1959

Groups

- 837th Air Base Group (later 837th Combat Support Group): 8 February 1958 – 1 February 1963
- 4411th Combat Crew Training Group: 8 April 1959 – 1 February 1963

Other

- USAF Advanced Flying Training School (Tactical Reconnaissance): March 1958 – c. 18 June 1959

=== Aircraft ===
- Douglas RB-66 Destroyer, 1958–1963
- Douglas WB-66 Destroyer, 1958–1963
- Republic RF-84F Thunderflash, 1958
- McDonnell RF-101 Voodoo, 1958–1963

=== Commanders ===
- Brig Gen Stephen B. Mack, 8 February 1958
- Brig Gen Thomas R. Ford, 25 June 1958
- Brig Gen Horace D. Aynesworth 1 August 1960 - 1 February 1963

== See also ==
- List of United States Air Force air divisions
