= Dan "Two Dogs" Hampton =

American Air Force officer and novelist

Dan Hampton
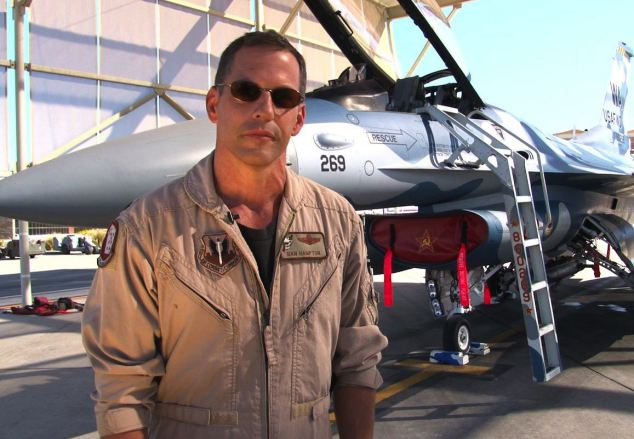
- Hampton in front of an F-16
- Spouse: Elizabeth Hampton
- Military career
- Allegiance: United States
- Branch: United States Air Force
- Service years: 1986–2006
- Rank: Lieutenant colonel
- Wars: Gulf War; Kosovo War; Iraq War
- Awards: Distinguished Flying Cross with valor (4); Purple Heart; Air Medal with valor (8); Meritorious Service Medal (5)
- Other work: Author, businessman, public speaker

Daniel James Hampton Jr. is a retired United States Air Force lieutenant colonel who served in the U.S. Air Force from 1986 to 2006. He flew 151 combat missions in the General Dynamics F-16 Fighting Falcon and logged 726 career combat hours. Lt. Col (Ret.) Hampton is best known as a "Wild Weasel", or surface to air missile (SAM) site killer, recording 21 hard kills on SAM sites. Hampton fought in multiple wars, including the Gulf War, Kosovo War, and Iraq War. He also flew combat air patrols during the terrorist attacks on the World Trade Center and the Pentagon on September 11, 2001. Hampton was wounded in the 1996 Khobar Towers bombing and again as a private military contractor in Baghdad.

Hampton is the author of The Mercenary, New York Times bestsellers Viper Pilot: A Memoir of Air Combat, Lords of the Sky, The Hunter Killers. The Flight, Chasing The Demon, and Operation Vengeance. Additionally, he was the CEO of MVI International, a private military company based out of Colorado.

== Early life ==
Hampton received his FAA private pilots license as a teenager. He earned a bachelor's degree from Texas A&M University. As a sophomore in college, he applied for a commission in the US Air Force and upon graduation became a second lieutenant in 1986. He was then slated to attend flight school where he was selected to fly the F-16. Hampton later attended the USN TopGun School (TOGS) and graduated from the elite USAF Fighter Weapons School. Lieutenant Colonel Hampton was selected to fly the F-16CJ, or "Wild Weasel" variant. The main role of this position is to fly over enemy airspace, draw fire primarily from SAM missile sites and subsequently destroy them, making the area safer for other aircraft and ground troops to enter. In his book, Viper Pilot: A Memoir of Air Combat, Hampton mentions that "SAM hunting is the most dangerous mission faced by today's fighter pilots, a job more difficult and hazardous than shooting down enemy jets".

== Education ==
He has studied abroad at Oxford University, and holds a Masters of Science degree from Embry-Riddle University as well as a Masters of Arts from Dartmouth College.

== Gulf War ==
Upon the start of the Gulf War, Hampton and the 23rd Fighter Squadron were deployed to Incirlik Air Base in Turkey in support of the uprisings in Iraq. Here, Hampton participated in Operation Proven Force, providing defense suppression missions in the area. During this operation the 23rd Fighter Squadron flew nearly 1,000 defense suppression, combat air patrol and interdiction missions over Iraq without a single loss. The squadron earned the Air Force Outstanding Unit Award with Valor for its part in driving the Iraqi army from Kuwait.

== Khobar Tower bombings ==
On June 26, 1996, the Khobar Tower, which was being used as a facility to house U.S. and Coalition forces engaged in Operation Southern Watch (a no-fly zone operation over southern Iraq), was bombed by terrorists belonging to Hezbollah Al-Hejaz, resulting in 19 deaths of American airmen and injuries to 472 people. This event is known as the Khobar Towers bombing. As a member of a deployed fighter wing, Hampton was residing in the building at the time and was subsequently injured from the attack. An excerpt from his book Viper Pilot says, "Twenty-five thousand pounds of TNT had been packed into a sewage service tanker trunk and driven up to the perimeter ... all the compound lights were out ... dust hung in the air, buildings were burning, people were running, and there was lots of shouting". There is speculation that the attacks could have been prevented if better security measures had been implemented.

== Iraq War ==
Hampton's experience in the Iraq War actually begins with his role in the September 11th attacks. The squadron he was assigned to had just returned from a deployment in Southwest Asia two days prior to the attacks. Hampton had just conducted a routine mission, and upon landing heard about the event. He said "We all thought it was an accident .. but after staring at the flat-screen picture of UA flight 175 hitting the South Tower, it became obvious this was no accident". Hampton also describes how he was ordered to return to the skies above American airspace, where he flew alongside a Delta Air Lines flight that had "a hundred faces pressed against the windows watching me watch them".

Hampton flew with the 77th Fighter Squadron during the Iraq War where he and his squadron were charged with destroying SAM sites and providing close air support. He earned his second Distinguished Flying Cross with Valor on March 24 near Nasiriyah, Iraq, by flying at 50 feet through a sandstorm to strafe an enemy armored column that was attempting to surround and cut off company of the 3rd Battalion/2nd Marines. His actions saved Marine lives and prevented the Iraqis from annihilating the beleaguered American unit.

== Writing career ==
Hampton began his writing career with Viper Pilot: A Memoir of Air Combat. Published in 2012, this New York Times bestseller offers an account of his personal life, and most importantly, modern air combat as seen through the F-16CJ during close air support and Wild Weasel missions.

Hampton's novel The Mercenary is a fictional book following a former military officer haunted by a personal tragedy in his past.

In his 2014 bestselling book Lords of the Sky: Fighter Pilots and Air Combat, from the Red Baron to the F-16, he writes a comprehensive history of military combat aviation from World War I to the present day.

Another national bestseller, The Hunter Killers, was released in 2015. Based on interviews with Wild Weasel veterans and previously unseen personal papers and declassified documents, as well as Hampton's experiences as an F-16 Wild Weasel pilot, it recounts the experiences of the first Wild Weasel pilots in the Vietnam War.

The Flight, a bestselling cockpit view of Charles Lindbergh's extraordinary 1927 New York to Paris record shattering epic journey, released in May, 2017 through William Morrow/HarperCollins. It was followed by "Chasing The Demon", another bestseller.

Operation Vengeance, his next book, was released in June 2020 through HarperCollins. The book addressed the events behind Operation Vengeance the American military operation to kill Admiral Isoroku Yamamoto of the Imperial Japanese Navy on April 18, 1943, and the actual intercept by Lockheed P-38 Lightning aircraft.

Hampton's books have been translated into a dozen languages and reviews have been published in Time, The Wall Street Journal, The New York Times, New York Post, USA Today, Parade, and Newsday. He has also been featured on The History Channel documentary "Finding Amelia". and the Travel Channel's "The Alaska Triangle", as well as the BBC, C-SPAN, and Breitling's "Anthem".

Colonel Hampton is a frequent guest discussing foreign affairs and geopolitics on CNN, Fox News, MSNBC, the BBC, Newsmax, SiriusXM, IHeart Radio, and NPR. He has been a guest analyst for Bill O'Reilly, Sean Hannity, Tucker Carlson, The Cycle, and Anderson Cooper360.

== Personal life ==
Dan Hampton is related to Wade Hampton III, a Civil War lieutenant general with the Confederacy; His maternal grandfather, Sgt. John Oscar Mullen Sr. (January 7, 1879 - February 28, 1954), was one of the Rough Riders who was injured in the left shoulder during the Battle of San Juan Hill; and Col. Daniel James Hampton Sr. (born 1936), who was an A-4 Skyhawk attack pilot in the Vietnam War. He is represented by Robert Gottlieb's Trident Media Group, and ICM Speakers Bureau in New York.

Hampton is married to Elizabeth Hampton.

== His publications ==
- The Hunter Killers: The Extraordinary Story of the First Wild Weasels, the Band of Maverick Aviators Who Flew the Most Dangerous Missions of the Vietnam War. William Morrow. 2015. ISBN 9780062375131. OCLC 891610308.
- Lords of the Sky: Fighter Pilots and Air Combat, from the Red Baron to the F-16. William Morrow. 2014. ISBN 9780062262011. OCLC 850180781.
- The Mercenary: a Novel. HarperCollins. 2013. ISBN 9780062264671. OCLC 828847526.
- Viper Pilot: A Memoir of Air Combat. William Morrow. 2012. ISBN 9780062130358. OCLC 777621138.
- The Flight: Charles Lindbergh's Daring and Immortal 1927 Transatlantic Crossing. William Morrow. 2017. ISBN 978-0-06-246439-2.
- Chasing the Demon: A Secret History Of The Quest For The Sound Barrier And The Band Of American Aces Who Conquered It. HarperCollins, 2018. ISBN 978-0-06-268872-9
- Operation Vengeance: The Astonishing Aerial Ambush That Changed World War II. HarperCollins, 2020. ISBN 0062938096
- Valor: The Astonishing World War II Saga of One Man's Defiance and Indomitable Spirit. St. Martin's Press, 2022. ISBN 1250275857
