= 77th Fighter Squadron =

77th Fighter Squadron

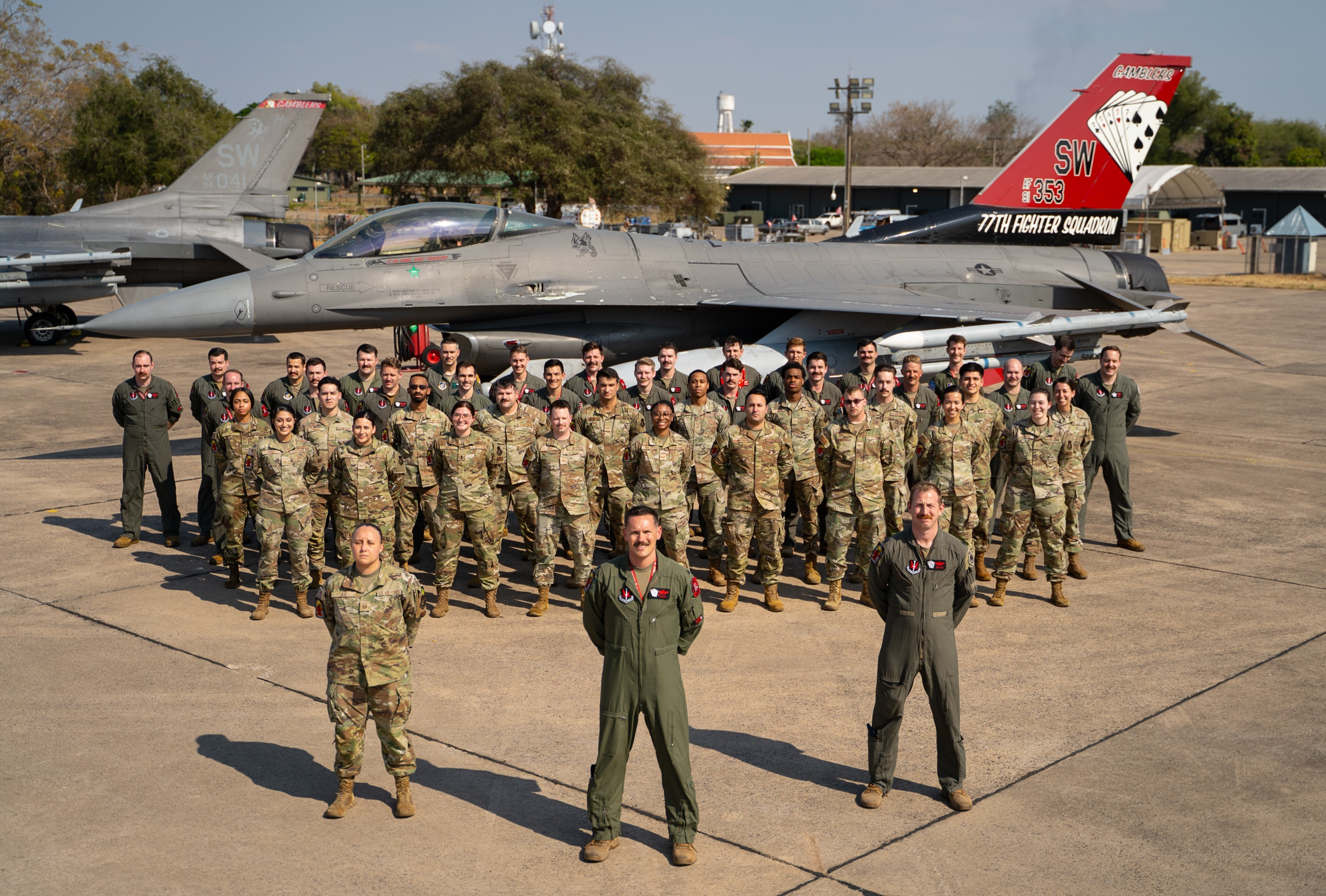
- 77th Fighter Squadron personnel and F-16C Fighting Falcon at Korat Royal Thai Air Force Base in 2025
- Active: 1918; 1930–1945; 1946–1993; 1994–present
- Country: United States
- Branch: United States Air Force
- Role: Fighter
- Part of: Air Combat Command
- Garrison/HQ: Shaw Air Force Base
- Nicknames: "The Gamblers" "All Aces, No Jokers"
- Engagements: European Theater of Operations; Persian Gulf War; Kosovo War; Global War on Terrorism: Iraq War
- Decorations: Distinguished Unit Citation; Air Force Meritorious Unit Award; Air Force Outstanding Unit Award

Commanders
- Notable commanders: General F. Michael Rogers; Colonel Virgil K. Meroney

Insignia
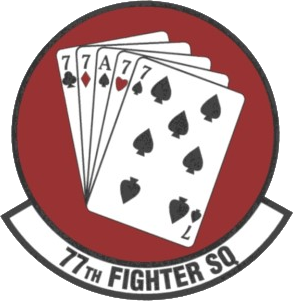
- 77th Fighter Squadron emblem (Note: Revised 9 March 1995.)

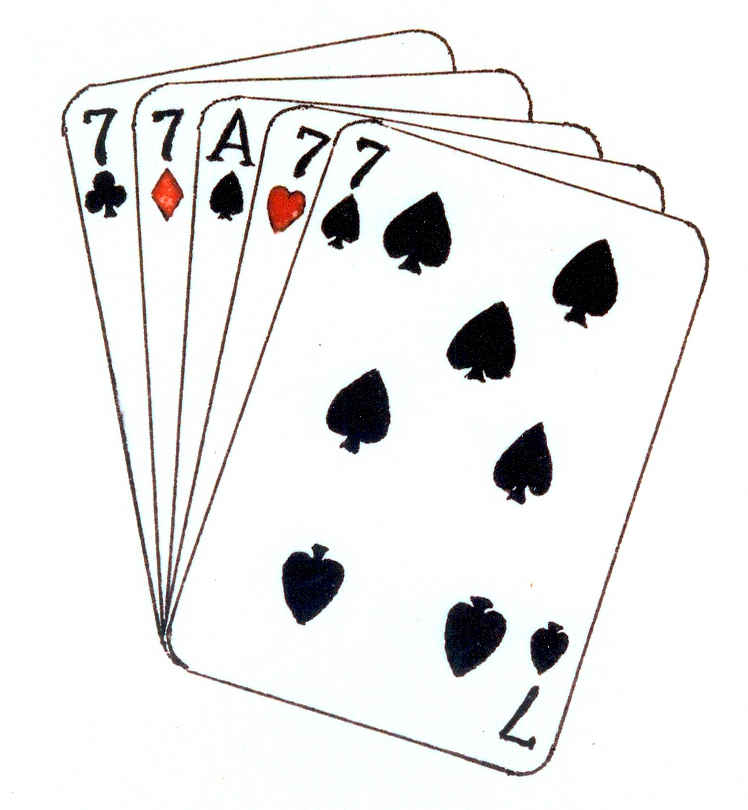
- 77th Pursuit Squadron emblem (Note: Approved 29 August 1931. Description: Five playing spot-cards arranged fanwise from dexter to sinister 7 of clubs, 7 of diamonds, ace of spades, 7 of hearts, 7 of spades, proper.)

The 77th Fighter Squadron is part of the 20th Fighter Wing at Shaw Air Force Base, South Carolina. It operates the General Dynamics F-16 Fighting Falcon aircraft conducting air superiority missions.

The squadron is one of the oldest in the United States Air Force, its origins dating to 20 February 1918, being organized at Rich Field, Waco Texas, as a pilot training Squadron during World War I. The squadron saw combat during World War II, and became part of the United States Air Forces in Europe during the Cold War.

== History ==
=== Early history ===
The 77th Aero Service Squadron was organized at Rich Field, Texas on 20 February 1918 with 2Lt. George P. Southworth as the squadron's first commander. On 28 February the squadron along with the 78th and 79th Aero Squadrons (which had also been born at Rich Field) moved by train on the Missouri–Kansas–Texas Railroad (commonly known as the Katy Railway) to Taliaferro Field #1 (later named Hicks Field), Texas. The 77th would then move to Taliaferro Field # 2 (later named Barron Field), Texas on 18 March 1918. In May 1918 2Lt. John Mason Tilney became squadron commander. On 21 July 1918 the 77th was redesignated Squadron A, Barron Field, Texas. A letter dated 24 July 1918 states "The use of numerical designations of squadrons will be restricted to those overseas and the eighty reserve squadrons authorized to be established at all times in this country". The vacated numbers were to be assigned to new squadrons as they were organized to replace squadrons shipped overseas. Some time after the squadrons designation was changed 2Lt. Edward S. Winfree took command and finally 2Lt. Hugh C. Downey became the squadron's last commander.

The 77th and later Squadron "A" provided personnel for base administrative activities and for various positions needed to maintain operations on Barron Field. The squadron was officially demobilized on 18 November 1918, but recently found documents seem to show the unit was not demobilized until March 1919.

There is also evidence that another 77th Aero Service Squadron may have existed. A letter from the Office Director Military Aeronautics Operations Section to Commander Barron Field dated 23 September 1918 requests that the records for the 77th Aero Service Squadron (renamed Squadron "A" by this time) be sent to Aviation General Supply Depot and Concentration Camp, Garden City, Long Island, New York for reorganization of the 77th.

The 77th (Squadron A) was reconstituted and consolidated with the 77th Observation squadron in 1936. The 77th Observations Squadron was constituted on 8 May 1929 and then was redesignated as the 77th Pursuit Squadron on 8 May 1929 but not activated. On 15 November the 77th Pursuit Squadron activated as the first tactical unit assigned to the 20th Pursuit Group at Mather Field, California, with an officer strength of four. Basically in 1936 the 77th Pursuit Squadron had its history merged with that of the 77 Aero Squadron (Squadron A).

=== World War II ===
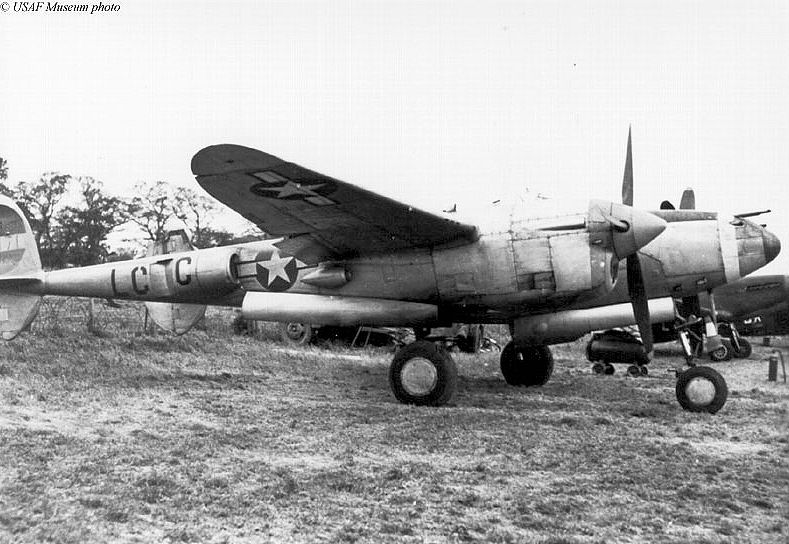
77th Fighter Squadron P-38 (LC-C) at RAF Kings Cliffe, England during World War II.

From 1930 until 1943, the squadron moved back and forth across the country with the 20th Group, flying several different aircraft, including the Boeing P-26 Peashooter, Curtiss P-36 Hawk, Lockheed P-38 Lightning, Bell P-39 Airacobra and the Curtiss P-40 Warhawk. In January 1943, the 77th settled at March Field, California, in time to be reassigned to England and the European Theater of Operations during World War II. The 77th, now designated a fighter squadron, arrived at RAF Kings Cliffe, Northamptonshire, England, in August 1943, flying the P-38. The 77th entered combat operations in November 1943, flying combat missions until 25 April 1945, when, armed with P-51 Mustangs, they began escorting "heavies" to Pilzen, Czechoslovakia, in one of the last raids of the war.

The 77th was instrumental in the 20th Group achieving its kill record of 432 enemy aircraft, 400 locomotives, 1,555 freight cars, 94 ammunition cars and 536 motor vehicles destroyed. The 77th left King's Cliffe, England, in the summer of 1945 and was inactivated in October 1945.

=== Cold War ===
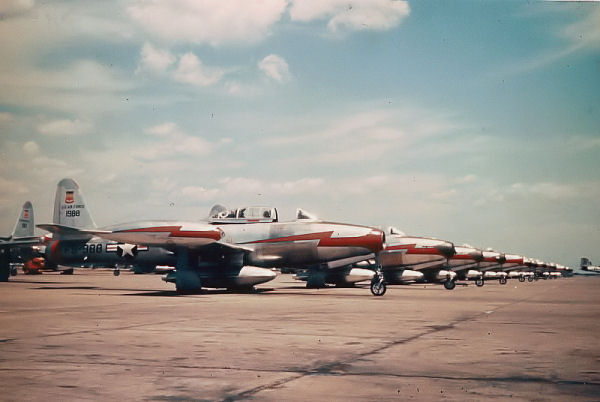
F-84Gs of the 77th Tactical Fighter Squadron/20th Tactical Fighter Wing at RAF Wethersfeld, UK - Early 1950s

The 77th and the 20th Group were reactivated in July 1946 at Biggs Field, Texas. Between 1946 and 1952 the squadron moved to Shaw Field, South Carolina, and then to Langley Air Force Base, Virginia, becoming the 77th Fighter-Bomber Squadron and transitioning to the Republic F-84 Thunderjet.

In May 1952, the 77th and the 20th were reassigned to RAF Wethersfield, England. In 1957, the squadron transitioned to the North American F-100 Super Sabre and a year later was designated a tactical fighter squadron flying the "Hun" for 11 more years as part of the North Atlantic Treaty Organization defence against the Soviet Union and Warsaw Pact. In 1969, the 77th and the 20th Tactical Fighter Wing began moving to RAF Upper Heyford and converted to the fighter-bomber version of the General Dynamics F-111 Aardvark, utilizing the F-111E model.

=== From the 1990s ===
The 77th Fighter Squadron was inactivated on 30 September 1993 and then reactivated at Shaw Air Force Base, South Carolina, on 1 January 1994. The squadron acquired F-16 aircraft and Airmen of the 17th Fighter Squadron that inactivated that same day. In 1996, the 77th deployed to Southwest Asia.

In 1999 and 2001, the 77th deployed to Southwest Asia flying missions over Iraq in support of Operation Northern Watch. The squadron also deployed in support of Operation Allied Force and Operation Desert Fox in 1999, scoring kills on Yugoslav warplanes. In 1997 and 2000, the 77th deployed to Southwest Asia flying missions over Iraq in support of Operation Southern Watch. In between deployments from 2001 to 2006, the 77th Fighter Squadron provided escort security to the President of the United States and Air Force One as part of Operation Noble Eagle and flew security missions daily over the Eastern Seaboard.

The 77th was awarded the 20th Fighter Wing Fighter Squadron of the Year in 1998 and 2000. In 2001, the squadron participated in many other deployments. From July to Sept. 2002, the 77th deployed to Operation Northern Watch. From February 2003 to May 2003, the squadron deployed to Prince Sultan Air Base, Saudi Arabia in Asia in support of Operation Iraqi Freedom.

Two F-16s from the squadron collided during a training flight on 15 October 2009. One F-16, piloted by Captain Lee Bryant, was able to land safely at Charleston Air Force Base, South Carolina. The other jet, piloted by Captain Nicholas Giglio, 32, apparently crashed into the ocean. Authorities believe that Giglio was killed instantly in the collision and did not eject.

==== 2013 Sequestration ====
Air Combat Command officials announced a stand down and reallocation of flying hours for the rest of the fiscal year 2013 due to mandatory budget cuts. The across-the board spending cuts, called sequestration, took effect 1 March when Congress failed to agree on a deficit-reduction plan.

Squadrons either stood down on a rotating basis or kept combat ready or at a reduced readiness level called "basic mission capable" for part or all of the remaining months in fiscal 2013. This affected the 77th Fighter Squadron with a stand-down grounding from 9 April-30 September 2013.

== Lineage ==
Squadron A, Barron Field

- Organized as the 77th Aero Squadron on 20 February 1918 (Note: This squadron is not related to an earlier 77th Aero Squadron, which was formed at Kelly Field in August 1917, and became the 489th Aero Squadron (Construction).)

Redesignated Squadron A, Barron Field, Texas on 21 July 1918
Demobilized on 18 November 1918
Reconstituted and consolidated with the 77th Pursuit Squadron as the 77th Pursuit Squadron on 1 October 1936

77th Fighter Squadron

- Constituted as the 77th Observation Squadron on 18 October 1927

Organized with reserve personnel on 16 May 1928
Redesignated 77th Pursuit Squadron on 8 May 1929
Activated on 15 November 1930
Consolidated with Squadron A, Barron Field, Texas on 1 October 1936
Redesignated 77th Pursuit Squadron (Fighter) on 6 December 1939
Redesignated 77th Pursuit Squadron (Interceptor) on 12 March 1941
Redesignated 77th Fighter Squadron on 15 May 1942
Redesignated 77th Fighter Squadron (Twin Engine) on 30 December 1942
Redesignated 77th Fighter Squadron, Two Engine on 20 August 1943
Redesignated 77th Fighter Squadron, Single Engine on 5 September 1944
Inactivated on 18 October 1945

- Activated on 29 July 1946

Redesignated 77th Fighter Squadron, Jet on 15 June 1948
Redesignated 77th Fighter-Bomber Squadron on 20 January 1950
Redesignated 77th Tactical Fighter Squadron on 8 July 1958
Redesignated 77th Fighter Squadron on 1 October 1991
Inactivated on 30 September 1993

- Activated on 1 January 1994

=== Assignments ===
- Post Headquarters, Rich Field, 20 February 1918
- Post Headquarters, Hicks Field, February 1918
- Post Headquarters, Barron Field, March-18 November 1918
- VIII Corps Area, 16 May 1928
- 20th Pursuit Group (later 20th Fighter Group), 15 November 1930 – 18 Oct 1945
- 20th Fighter Group (later 20th Fighter-Bomber Group), 29 July 1946 (attached to 20th Fighter-Bomber Wing after 15 November 1952)
- 20th Fighter-Bomber Wing (later 20th Tactical Fighter Wing), 8 February 1955 (attached to 39th Tactical Group, 1–31 August 1990 and February 1991)
- 20th Operations Group, 31 March 1992 – 30 September 1993
- 20th Operations Group, 1 January 1994 – present

=== Stations ===
- Rich Field, Texas, 20 February 1918
- Taliaferro Field No. 1 (later, Hicks Field), Texas, February 1918
- Taliaferro Field No. 2, (later, Barron Field) Texas, March-18 November 1918
- Mather Field, California, 15 November 1930
- Barksdale Field, Louisiana, 31 October 1932
- Moffett Field, California. 19 November 1939
- Hamilton Field, California, 9 September 1940
- Bluethenthal Field, North Carolina, c. 21 February 1942
- Morris Field, North Carolina, 24 April 1942
- Drew Field, Florida, August 1942
- Paine Field, Washington, 30 September 1942
- March Field, California, c. 1 January–11 August 1943
- RAF Kings Cliffe (AAF-367), England, c. 27 August 1943 – 11 October 1945
- Camp Kilmer, New Jersey, 16–18 October 1945
- Biggs Field, Texas, 29 July 1946
- Shaw Field (later Shaw Air Force Base), South Carolina, c. 25 October 1946
- Langley Air Force Base, Virginia, 19 November 1951 – 22 May 1952
- RAF Wethersfield, England, 1 June 1952
- RAF Shepherds Grove, England, 9 August 1955
- RAF Wethersfield, England, 27 April 1956
- RAF Upper Heyford, England, c. 1 May 1970 – 30 September 1993

Deployed at Incirlik Air Base, Turkey, 1–31 August 1990 and February 1991

- Shaw Air Force Base, South Carolina, 1 January 1994 – present

=== Aircraft ===
- Curtiss JN-4, JN-6, and perhaps Thomas-Morse S-4 during 1918
- Boeing P-12, 1930–1935
- Dayton-Wright DH-4 during 1931
- Boeing P-26 Peashooter, 1934–1938
- Curtiss P-36 Hawk, 1938–1940
- Curtiss P-40 Warhawk, 1940–1942
- Bell P-39D Airacobra, 1942–1943
- Lockheed P-38H Lightning, 1943–1944
- Lockheed P-38J Lightning, 1943–1944
- North American P-51C Mustang, 1944–1945
- North American P-51D Mustang, 1944–1945
- North American P-51K Mustang 1946–1948
- Republic F-84D Thunderjet, 1948–1951
- Republic F-84G Thunderjet, 1951–1957
- F-100D Super Sabre, 1957–1970
- General Dynamics F-111E, 1970–1993
- F-16C/D Fighting Falcon (Block 50), 1994–Present

== See also ==
- List of American Aero Squadrons
- Dan "Two Dogs" Hampton
