= Wild Weasel =

US code name for a type of military aircraft

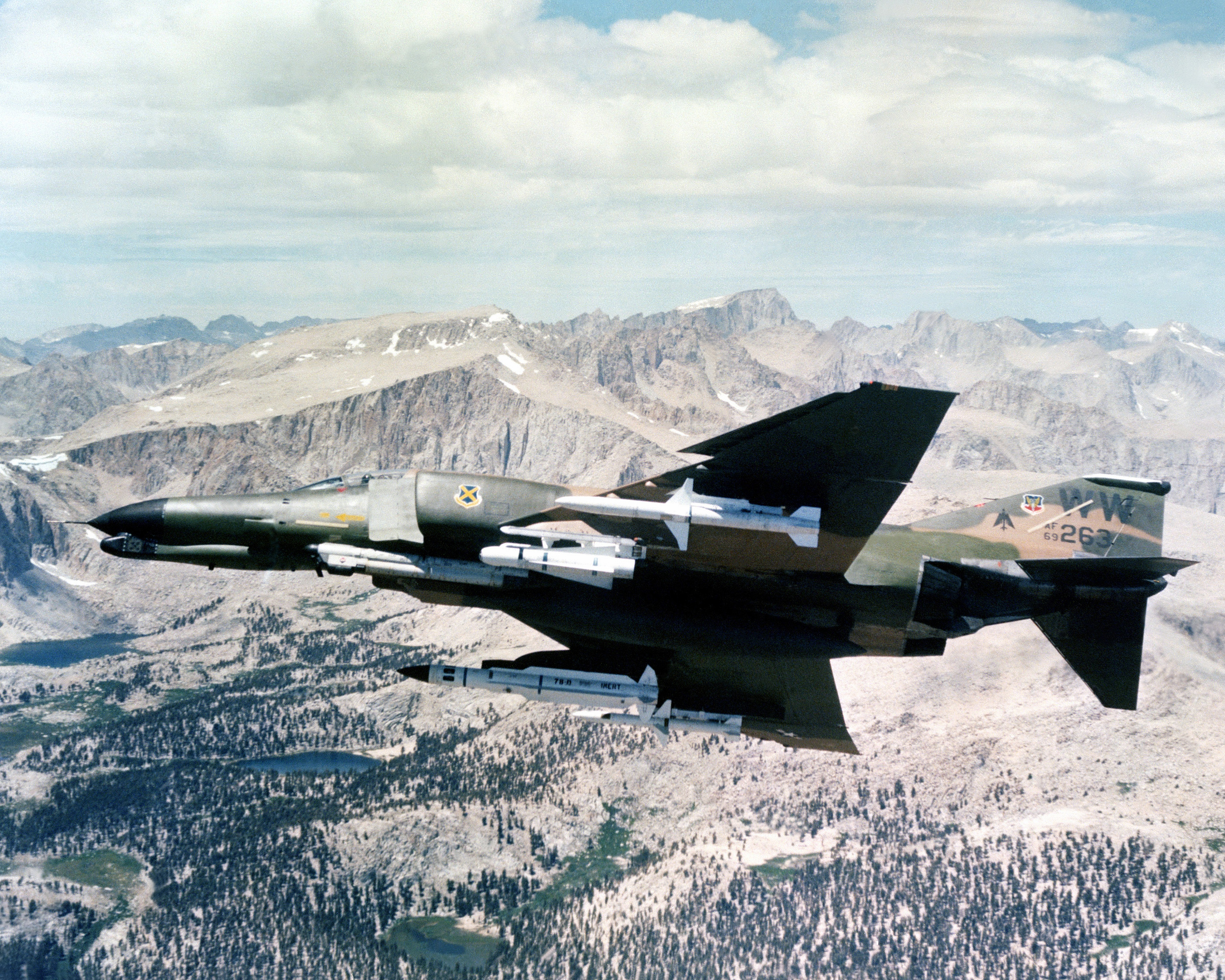
An F-4G with WW payload; near to far: AGM-88 HARM, AGM-65 Maverick, AN/ALQ-119 ECM pod, AGM-78 Standard ARM and AGM-45 Shrike, circa 1981.

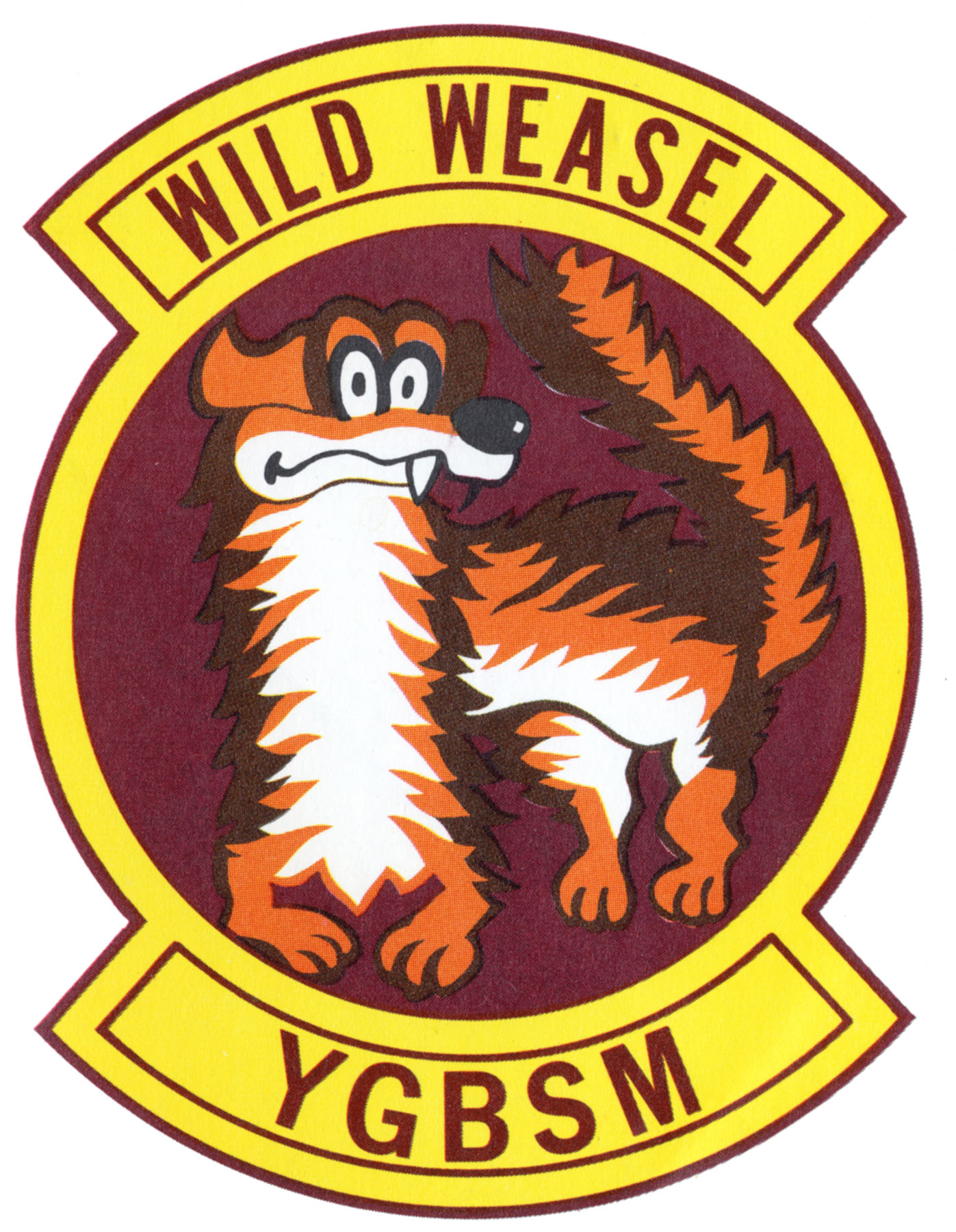
Wild Weasel patch. The letters at the bottom stand for "You gotta be shitting me." (Note: The term has a similar meaning to "you can't be serious" and is an expression of disbelief)

Wild Weasel is a code name given by the United States Air Force (USAF) to any aircraft equipped with anti-radiation missiles and used to suppress enemy air defenses by destroying their radar and surface-to-air missile (SAM) installations. A Wild Weasel pilot baits an enemy into targeting their aircraft with their radars, then traces the radar emissions back to their source, allowing the Weasel or its teammates to precisely target it for destruction.

The USAF developed the Wild Weasel concept in 1965 during the Vietnam War after Soviet SAMs began downing American strike aircraft participating in Operation Rolling Thunder over North Vietnam. The program was headed by General Kenneth Dempster. "The first Wild Weasel success came soon after the first Wild Weasel mission 20 December 1965 when Captains Al Lamb and Jack Donovan took out a site during a Rolling Thunder strike on the railyard at Yên Bái, some 75 mi (120 km) northwest of Hanoi", wrote historian Walter J. Boyne. Wild Weasel tactics and techniques were adopted by other nations and integrated into U.S. efforts to suppress enemy air defenses to establish air supremacy before full-scale conflict.

The missions were known by the operational code "Iron Hand" when first authorized on 12 August 1965, though technically this term referred only to the suppression attack before the main strike. The term "Wild Weasel" derives from Project Wild Weasel, the USAF development program for a dedicated SAM-detection and suppression aircraft. Originally named "Project Ferret", denoting a predatory animal that goes into its prey's den to kill it (hence: "to ferret out"), the name was changed to differentiate it from the code-name "Ferret" that had been used during World War II for radar-countermeasures bombers.

== Equipment ==
=== Wild Weasel I ===
The Wild Weasel concept was proposed in 1965 to counter the increasing North Vietnamese SAM threat. Air Force crews flew the two-seat F model of the F-100 Super Sabre, while the United States Navy primarily relied upon the A-4 Skyhawk. The F-100F Wild Weasel lacked the performance characteristics to survive in a high threat environment. The first Wild Weasel squadron was the 354th Tactical Fighter Squadron based at Takhli Royal Thai Air Base, Thailand. After 45 days of operations against North Vietnamese targets, the 354th had one airplane left and of the 16 aircrew members, four had been killed, two were prisoners of war, three had been wounded and two had quit.

=== Wild Weasel II and III ===
The Wild Weasel II version was the first unsuccessful attempt to use the F-4C Phantom as a Wild Weasel platform. When that effort failed, the Wild Weasel role was then passed to the F-105F in the summer of 1966. The F-105F was converted for the role and was designated Wild Weasel III. The F-105F was equipped with more advanced radar, jamming equipment, and a heavier armament. Anti-radiation missiles were outfitted that could seek out radar emplacements. The F-105F Wild Weasel airframes were eventually modified with improved countermeasures components in a standardized configuration and designated the F-105G. The F-105G was also designated Wild Weasel III; 61 F-105F units were upgraded to F-105G specifications. Although in some documentation the F-105F was referred to as an EF-105F, that designation never existed in the operational flying squadrons.

=== Wild Weasel IV ===
The F-105 was no longer in production by 1964. With severe combat attrition of the F-105 inventory, the need for a more sophisticated aircraft resulted in the conversion of 36 F-4C Phantom II aircraft, designated F-4C Wild Weasel IV. The F-4C Wild Weasel IV also bore the unofficial designation of EF-4C.

=== Wild Weasel V ===
The F-4E, the most advanced Phantom variant with extensive ground-attack capabilities and an internal gun, became the basis for the F-4G Wild Weasel V (also known as the Advanced Wild Weasel). This modification consisted of removing the gun and replacing it with the AN/APR-38 Radar Homing and Warning Receiver (later upgraded to the AN/APR-47), and a cockpit upgrade for the back seat to manage the electronic combat environment. A total of 134 F-4G models were converted from F-4Es with the first one flying in 1975. Squadron service began in 1978.

F-4Gs were deployed to three active wings. One was stationed at George AFB, Victorville, California, as part of the Rapid Deployment Force; one wing was assigned to USAFE (US Air Forces in Europe) at Spangdahlem AB, Germany; and the other to PACAF (Pacific Air Forces) at Clark AB, Philippines. F-4Gs from George AFB, Clark AB and Spangdahlem AB saw combat during Operation Desert Storm in 1991, successfully protecting strike packages from enemy air defenses. During this conflict the F-4G saw heavy use, with only a single loss: an aircraft from Spangdahlem AB crashed in Saudi Arabia while returning from a mission, after one of the AGM-88 HARM anti-radiation missiles hang fired which left the aircraft's instruments not displaying the correct altitude information and a significant frame tweak from the damage made the plane hard to control. After an investigation into the loss of the aircraft which occurred during several aborted landing attempts in a sandstorm, it was determined that a fuel cell was punctured by anti-aircraft fire. The pilot and EWO safely ejected after the engines shut down when the aircraft ran out of fuel attempting to land at a forward airstrip.

After Desert Storm, some of the George AFB aircraft were assigned to the 124th Wing of the Air National Guard at Boise, Idaho, 190th Fighter Squadron. Aircraft from Spangdahlem, Clark, and the remainder from George were assigned to the 561st Fighter Squadron, 57th Fighter Wing (Active Duty) at Nellis AFB, Las Vegas. The aircraft remained in service until 1996, with both squadrons participating in frequent deployments to Saudi Arabia and Turkey in support of Operation Provide Comfort, Operation Southern Watch, and Operation Vigilant Warrior enforcing the no-fly zones over Iraq. By this time the F-4G was the last operational variant of the Phantom II in the US forces. Many of the airframes were later used as target drones and Aircraft Battle Damage Repair training aids.

=== Current ===
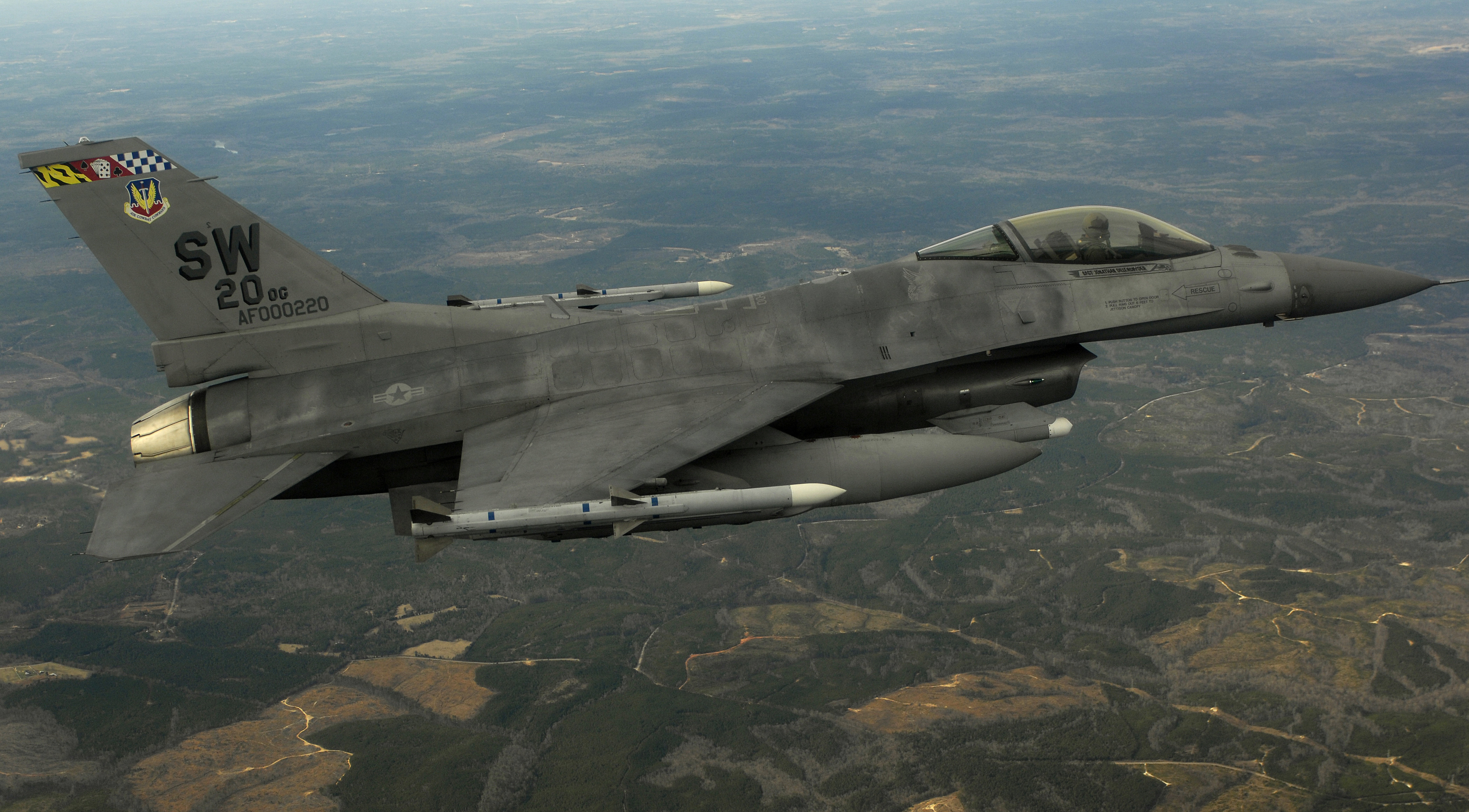
An F-16CJ of the 20th Fighter Wing.

A change in aircraft design theory to stress versatile multi-role aircraft meant that the F-4G Phantom was the last aircraft in the USAF inventory specifically outfitted for the SEAD (suppress enemy air defenses) role. The Wild Weasel mission is now assigned to the F-16 Fighting Falcon, using the Block 50 and Block 52, with production beginning in 1991. The single-seat Block 50/52 F-16C is specifically tasked with this mission and aircraft modified for this mission are designated F-16CJ/DJ. The pilot now performs both the role of flying the airplane and targeting and employing against ground threats. Other aircraft, while capable of engaging anti-air emplacements, are typically tasked with other primary missions; the A-10 Thunderbolt II "Warthog", primarily tasked with CAS missions, lacks the avionics to perform a true SEAD mission and does not carry the AGM-88 HARM. The F-15E Strike Eagle, possessing advanced air-to-ground avionics but also high speed and long range, is typically tasked with "deep strike" missions, which can include SAM installations but typically focuses on high-value targets such as enemy command & control, infrastructure and production, and likewise does not carry HARM.

The ECR variant of the Panavia Tornado is dedicated to SEAD missions and is currently operated by the German Air Force and Italian Air Force. The Royal Air Force used the GR4 variant to conduct similar missions utilising the ALARM missile, though they were mainly used in the interdiction/CAS role. The RAF retired the ALARM missile in 2013 and retired the Tornado in 2019.

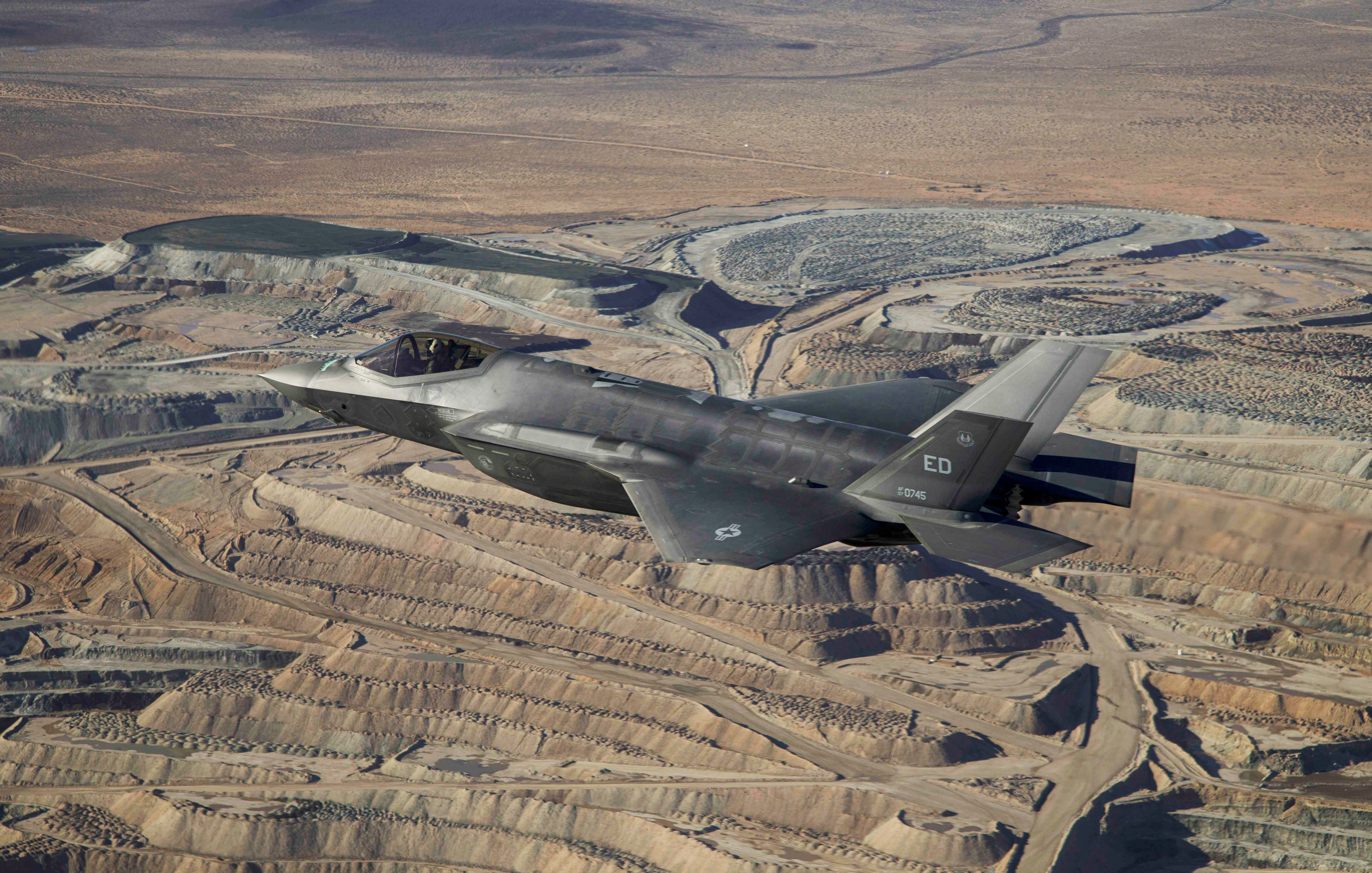
A F-35A of the 461st Flight Test Squadron over the Mojave Desert

The F-35 Lightning II is slated to gradually replace these aircraft for various air-to-ground roles, including SEAD, beginning with its introduction in 2016. Its stealth capabilities promise a significant increase in effectiveness against air-defence radars, though to maintain its lowest radar signature, its payload capacity would be limited to the internal weapons bays, reducing the number of missile site attacks per sortie. However, it can carry more or larger air to ground weapons internally than even the F-22 and is more advanced in a ground attack capacity, potentially making it the best crewed aircraft for destroying sophisticated enemy air defenses. Additionally, the AGM-88G AARGM-ER, itself an evolution of the AGM-88 HARM, is being integrated into all three variants of the F-35. The F-35A and F-35C will have the ability to carry the AARGM-ER internally, while the F-35B will only be able to carry the missile externally owing to its smaller internal weapons bays.

== Mission tactics ==
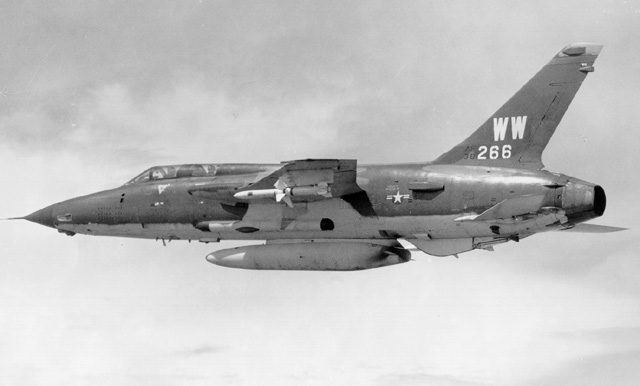
F-105 Thunderchief Wild Weasel.

In 1966 over North Vietnam, Wild Weasel flights of four aircraft sometimes were led by a single F-105F/G two-seat aircraft (aided by its Electronic Warfare Officer (EWO) with his electronic receivers and analyzers) plus three F-105Ds. Sometimes two "F"s, each with a "D" wingman, operated independently.

The Wild Weasel mission was to precede strike flights, clearing the target area of radar guided surface-to-air missile threats (predominantly SA-2 'Guideline' systems), leaving the threat area last, which sometimes would result in 3.5-hour missions, before returning to Royal Thai Air Force Bases. This was achieved by turning toward the air defense site in a threatening manner, firing radar homing missiles at the site, or visually locating the site to dive bomb it. These tactics were attempted while under attack by MiGs and anti-aircraft artillery.

The F-105F did not use radar jamming devices since its purpose was to provide a decoy target, protecting the strike flights, and encouraging SAM launches that generated enough bright smoke to make possible seeing the SAM site for immediate dive bombing attack. With multiple incoming missiles in visual sight it was possible to dive abruptly or sharply break to avoid them. Failure to see the missiles approaching at three times fighter cruise speed would result in the destruction of the aircraft and failure of the mission.

Vietnam War tactics of using "Hunter-Killer" teams, where an F-4G Wild Weasel would be teamed with one or more conventional F-4E Phantoms, were improved upon with the newer equipment. The Wild Weasel would destroy missile radar emitters, clearing the way for the F-4E's to destroy the rest of the missile site using cluster munitions.

A tactic used during Operation Desert Storm was known as "Here, kitty kitty", wherein one Weasel would get the attention of a SAM or anti-aircraft artillery site while other Weasels would then sneak up behind the site and destroy it.

In one of the Wild Weasel concept's most famous uses in military operations, five F-105Gs, using the call-signs "Firebird 01–05", provided support for the Son Tay P.O.W. rescue mission, which was conducted in the early morning hours of 21 November 1970. One of these aircraft was shot down by an SA-2 surface-to-air missile, but its crew ejected safely and was rescued by the HH-53 "Super Jolly" helicopters that also participated in the raid. None of the aircraft of the raiding force protected by Wild Weasels was lost to enemy action.

== Motto and traditions ==
The unofficial motto of the Wild Weasel crews is YGBSM: "You Gotta Be Shittin' Me". This appears prominently on the logo patch of some squadrons. As the story goes, this was the response of Jack Donovan, a former B-52 EWO (Electronic Warfare Officer):

This was the natural response of an educated man, a veteran EWO on B-52s and the like, upon learning that he was to fly back seat to a self-absorbed fighter pilot while acting as flypaper for enemy SAMs.

According to Dan Hampton in his memoir, Viper Pilot: A Memoir of Air Combat, Jack Donovan said:

"You want me to fly in the back of a tiny little jet with a crazy fighter pilot who thinks he's invincible, home in on a SAM site in North Vietnam, and shoot it before it shoots me? You've gotta be shittin' me!"

The motto "First in, Last out" was also used.

The "WW" tailcode of the 35th Tactical Fighter Wing and the 37th Tactical Fighter Wing derives from their Wild Weasel heritage.

== See also ==
- Operation Iron Hand
- Active radar homing
- Panavia Tornado ECR
- List of U.S. Department of Defense code names
