= 609th Information Warfare Squadron =

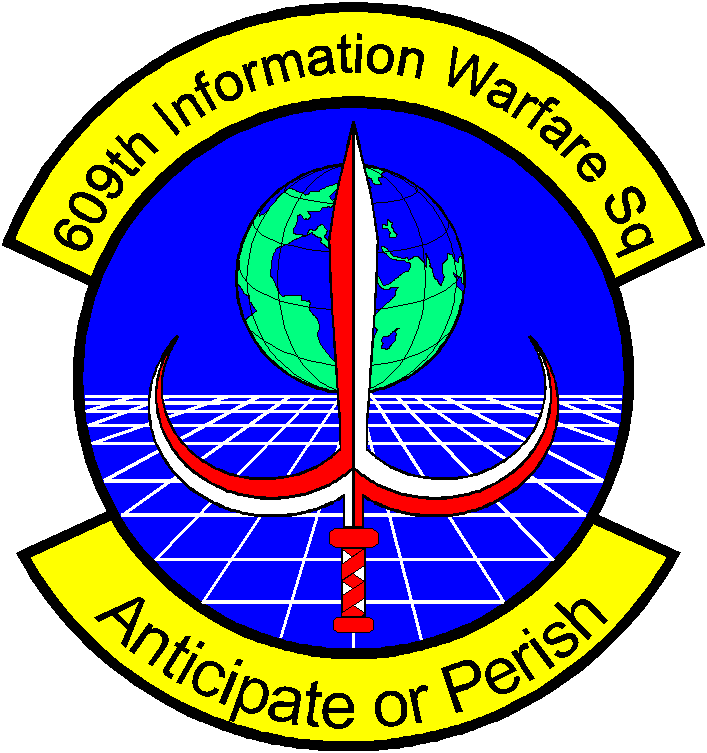
- 609th Information Warfare Squadron emblem
- Active: 1995 - 1999
- Country: United States of America
- Branch: United States Air Force (1995 - 1999)
- Part of: 9th Air Force
- Garrison/HQ: Shaw Air Force Base
- Nickname: 609 IWS
- Motto: Anticipate or Perish

The 609th Information Warfare Squadron was a squadron assigned to 9th Air Force under Air Combat Command with headquarters at Shaw Air Force Base in Sumter, South Carolina. It was the first operational information warfare combat unit in United States military history. It primarily supported fighter wings in the eastern United States and in the United States Central Air Forces area of operations.

== History ==
=== Lineage ===
- Established as 609th Information Warfare Squadron and activated on 28 September 1995.

Inactivated on 30 June 1999

=== Assignments ===
- 9th Air Force, 28 September 1995 – 30 June 1999

=== Stations ===
- Shaw AFB, South Carolina, 28 September 1995 – 30 June 1999.
