= 562nd Flying Training Squadron =

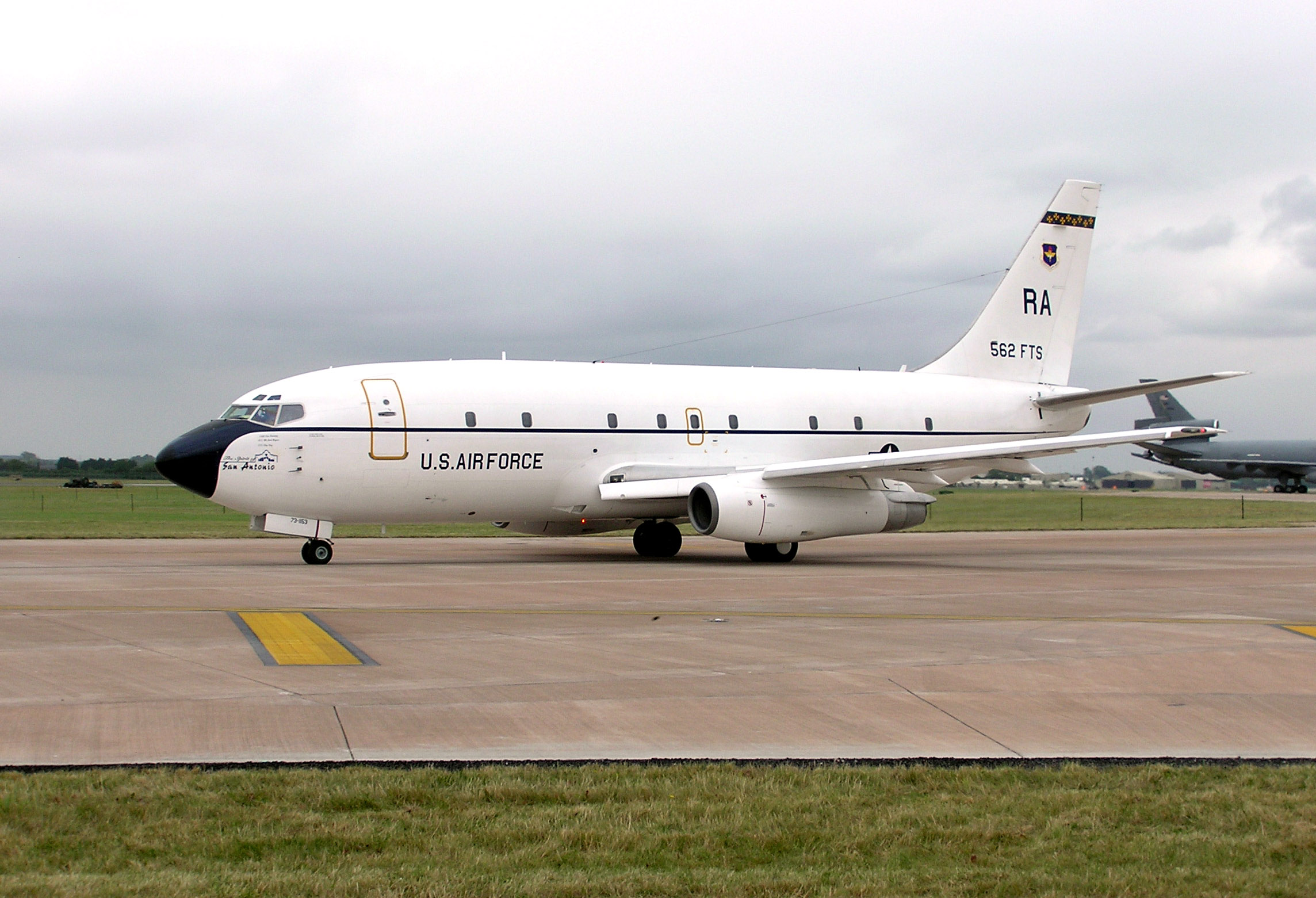
- Boeing T-43 operated by the 562nd at RAF Fairford (Note: Aircraft is Boeing T-43A-BN Bobcat, serial 73-1153, Spirit of San Antonio. Retired from the Air Force on 17 September 2010 and on display at Randolph Air Force Base. Baugher, Joe (25 March 2023). "1973 USAF Serial Numbers". Joe Baugher.)
- Active: 1942-1945; 1947-1949; 1953-1957 1962-1972; 1974-1992; 1993-2010
- Country: United States
- Branch: United States Air Force
- Role: Navigator Training
- Part of: Air Education and Training Command
- Garrison/HQ: Randolph Air Force Base
- Engagements: European Theater of Operations; Vietnam War; Gulf War
- Decorations: Distinguished Unit Citation; Air Force Outstanding Unit Award with Combat "V" Device; Air Force Outstanding Unit Award

Insignia
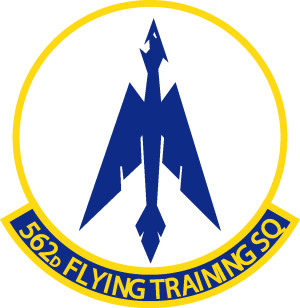
- 562nd Flying Training Squadron emblem (Note: Approved 28 July 1970.)

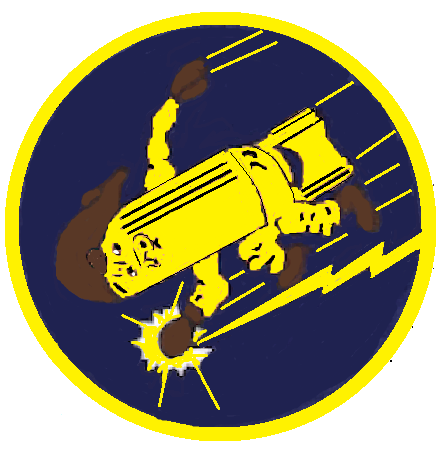
- 562nd Bombardment Squadron emblem (Note: Approved 7 July 1944. Description: On a medium blue disc, border yellow, a yellow aerial bomb caricatured in form of a fighter, with look of ferocity on face, diving toward dexter base, having legs and arms, and wearing shoes, boxing gloves, aviator's helmet and white goggles, striking a blow with the right gloved hand, and leaving large yellow impact mark ay point of yellow lightning flash, all emitting yellow speed lines to rear.)

The 562nd Flying Training Squadron (officially, the 562d Flying Training Squadron) is an inactive United States Air Force unit. It was part of the 12th Flying Training Wing at Randolph Air Force Base, Texas, where it operated the Boeing T-43 Bobcat conducting navigator training from 1993 until inactivating on 19 November 2010.

The squadron was originally activated during World War II as the 562d Bombardment Squadron. After training in the United States, it deployed to the European Theater of Operations, where it participated in the strategic bombing campaign against Germany. The squadron was twice awarded the Distinguished Unit Citation for its combat actions. Following V-E Day, it returned to the United States and was inactivated. The squadron was briefly active in the reserve in the late 1940s, but does not appear to have been fully manned or equipped.

The squadron was redesignated the 562d Fighter-Bomber Squadron and activated in 1953. It moved to Europe, but was inactivated in 1957, when it was replaced by another unit. It was activated again as the 562d Tactical Fighter Squadron in 1962. It conducted frequent deployments, but focused on training pilots for operations in Southeast Asia. Elements of the squadron participated in combat there, although the squadron remained in the United States. From 1973, it conducted Wild Weasel training. It deployed elements for Desert Storm before inactivating in 1992.

== History ==
=== World War II ===
==== Initial training and deployment ====
The 562d was first activated as the 562d Bombardment Squadron at Gowen Field, Idaho, one of the four original squadrons of the 388th Bombardment Group, in December 1942. The cadre that formed at Gowen moved to Wendover Field, Utah in February 1943, where the unit was fully manned and squadron training with Boeing B-17 Flying Fortress heavy bombers began. Training continued until June 1943, when it deployed to England. The air echelon ferried its B-17s to England via the northern ferry route, while the ground echelon departed for Camp Kilmer, New Jersey, the port of embarkation, sailing in the RMS Queen Elizabeth on 1 July.

==== Combat in Europe ====
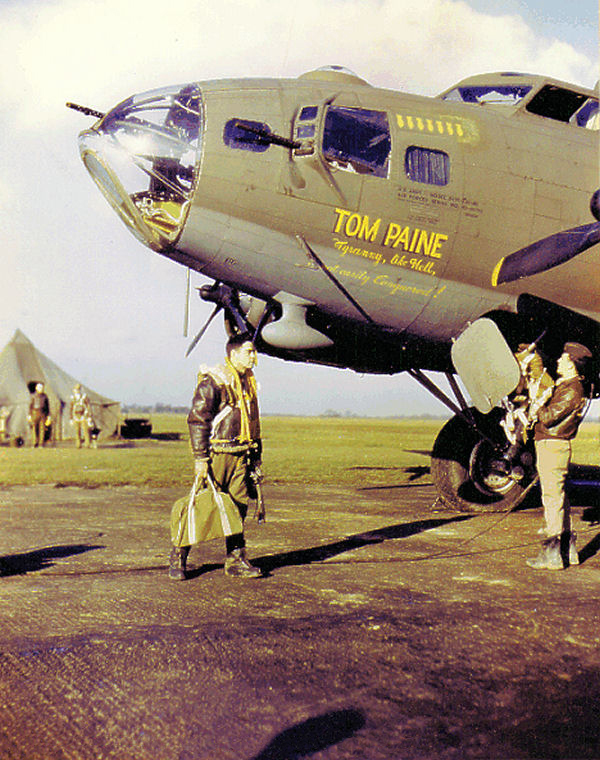
388th Group B-17 in England (Note: Aircraft is Boeing B-17F-120-BO Flying Fortress, serial 42-30793, Tom Paine. It flew its last combat mission on 29 December 1944. Baugher, Joe (10 April 2023). "1942 USAF Serial Numbers". Joe Baugher.)

The squadron assembled at RAF Knettishall, its combat station, and flew its first combat mission on 17 July, when it attacked an aircraft factory in Amsterdam. The squadron primarily engaged in the strategic bombing campaign against Germany, attacking industrial sites, oil refineries and storage facilities, communications centers and naval targets on the European Continent.

The squadron was awarded a Distinguished Unit Citation (DUC) for attacking an aircraft factory at Regensburg, Germany, on 17 August 1943, withstanding heavy resistance to reach the target. It was awarded a second DUC for three separate missions: an earlier attack on a tire and rubber factory in Hanover, Germany on 26 July 1943 and two missions in 1944, one against synthetic oil refineries near Brüx, Germany (Note: Now Most, Czech Republic.) on 12 May and at Ruhland, Germany on 21 June. This last attack was on a shuttle bombing mission from England to Germany to Poltava, USSR, (Note: Now in Ukraine.) to Foggia, Italy, and back to England. Other strategic targets included aircraft factories at Brunswick, Kassel, and Reims; airfields at Paris, Berlin and in Bordeaux; naval installations at Emden, Kiel and La Pallice, chemical works in Ludwigshafen; ball bearing factories at Schweinfurt and rail marshalling yards in Bielefeld, Brussels, and Osnabruck.

The squadron was occasionally diverted from the strategic campaign to perform air support and interdiction missions. It attacked military installations in France in early 1944 to help prepare the way for Operation Overlord, the invasion of Normandy, and on D Day hit coastal defenses, artillery batteries and transportation targets. It attacked troop concentrations and supply depots. In July 1944, it supported Operation Cobra at Saint Lo and the following month attacked targets in Caen. It struck military installations and airfields near Arnhem during Operation Market Garden, the unsuccessful attempt to secure a bridgehead across the Rhine in the Netherlands. It attacked transportation targets to support the final drive through Germany in early 1945.

==== Return and inactivation ====
The squadron flew its last combat mission to the Landsberg Airfield near Munich, on 21 April 1945. After V-E Day, the squadron flew missions to the Netherlands to drop food in flooded areas. It then began redeploying to the United States. Its aircraft left Knettishall between 9 June and 5 July 1945. The ground echelon sailed again on the Queen Elizabeth on 5 August. The squadron inactivated at Sioux Falls Army Air Field, South Dakota on 28 August 1945.

=== Air reserve ===
The squadron was activated in the reserves at Orchard Place Airport, Illinois on 12 June 1947 and assigned to the 338th Bombardment Group. The squadron trained under the supervision of Air Defense Command (ADC)'s 141st AAF Base Unit (Reserve Training) (later the 2471st Air Force Reserve Flying Training Center), although it does not appear that it was fully manned or equipped. Although nominally a bombardment unit, the squadron was equipped with North American AT-6 Texan and Beechcraft AT-11 Kansan trainers.

In July 1948 Continental Air Command (ConAC) assumed responsibility for managing reserve and Air National Guard units from ADC. In 1949, the 562nd began to fly a few Curtiss C-46 Commando and Douglas C-47 Skytrain troop carriers and Douglas B-26 Invader light bombers, but it was inactivated in June when ConAC reorganized its reserve units under the wing base organization system. President Truman's reduced 1949 defense budget also required reductions in the number of units in the Air Force, At O'Hare, the 338th Group and its squadrons were inactivated, and most of its personnel transferred to the 437th Troop Carrier Wing.

=== Fighter operations in Europe ===
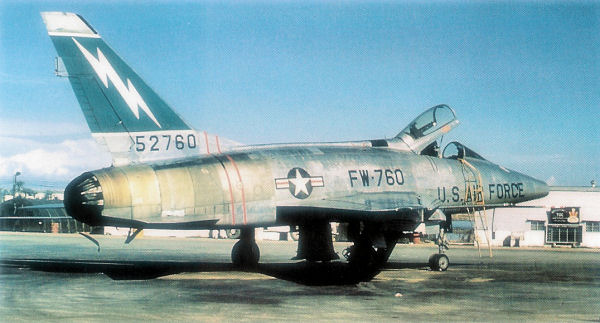
F-100 of the 562nd Tac Fighter Squadron (Note: Aircraft is North American F-100D-40-NH Super Sabre, serial 55-2760. It was transferred to the Turkish Air Force on 27 May 1959. Baugher, Joe (21 April 2023). "1955 USAF Serial Numbers". Joe Baugher.)

The squadron was redesignated the 562d Fighter-Bomber Squadron and activated at Clovis Air Force Base, New Mexico in November 1953. The squadron was equipped with North American F-86F Sabres, with a capability of carrying nuclear weapons. A year after activation, in November 1954, the squadron was transferred to United States Air Forces Europe and departed, along with other elements of the 388th Fighter-Bomber Wing, for Étain-Rouvres Air Base, France. However, construction at Etain was not far enough advanced to permit it to accept fighter aircraft, and only the wing headquarters settled in to the base. Instead, the squadron ferried their Sabres to Spangdahlem Air Base, Germany, arriving the following month.

Little flying was done in the squadron's first winter in Europe due to weather. It deployed to Wheelus Air Base, Libya in April 1955, where it was able to train in gunnery and bombing for the first time since arriving in Europe. The squadron rejoined the wing at its permanent base in France in September 1955. Starting in November 1955, it began deployments to Detachment 1 of the 388th Wing at Hahn Air Base, Germany to stand nuclear alert. The detachment moved to Spangdahlem in February 1956.

In August 1956, the squadron began training to convert to the North American F-100 Super Sabre. The conversion was completed by May 1957. However, the squadron flew the "Hun" for less than a year. On 10 December 1957, the 49th Fighter-Bomber Wing moved from Japan on paper to replace the 388th Wing, The 562d was inactivated and its mission, personnel and aircraft transferred to the 8th Fighter-Bomber Squadron.

=== F-105 fighter operations ===
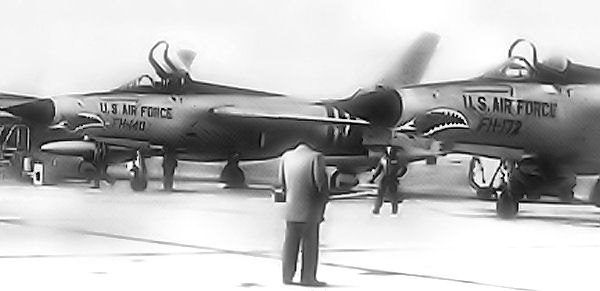
F-105Ds of the 562nd Tactical Fighter Squadron, deployed from McConnell AFB to Thailand in 1965

The squadron was redesignated the 562d Tactical Fighter Squadron, organized at McConnell Air Force Base, Kansas in October 1962 and assigned to the 388th Tactical Fighter Wing. In February 1964, the 388th was replaced at McConnell by the 23d Tactical Fighter Wing. The 562d was equipped with the Republic F-105 Thunderchief. The squadron conducted tactical operations and training in preparation for global deployment. In August 1965, the 562nd deployed to Takhli Royal Thai Air Force Base, Thailand, relieving the 563d Tactical Fighter Squadron, which had been there since April. For the next five months, it participated in sustained combat operations in the Vietnam War. In November, the 355th Tactical Fighter Wing replaced the 6235th Tactical Fighter Wing at Takhli and the Air Force began to station permanent fighter squadrons there. The squadron returned to McConnell in December, but earned an Air Force Outstanding Unit Award with Combat "V" Device during its combat tour in Thailand.

In January 1966, the squadron focused on training replacement F-105 pilots for units in Southeast Asia. It continued this mission until August 1970, when the need for "Thud Drivers" diminished with the withdrawal of the United States from Southeast Asia. The squadron continued to fly the F-105 until inactivated in September 1972.

=== Wild Weasel operations ===
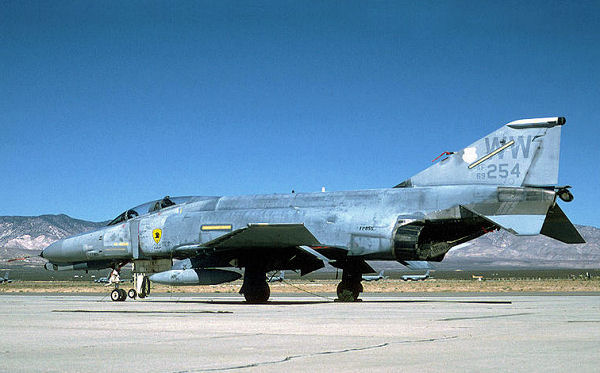
35th Wing F-4G at George AFB in 1989

The squadron was again activated on 31 October 1974 at George Air Force Base, California and assigned to the 35th Tactical Fighter Wing. It was once again equipped with F-105s, but now with the two seat F-105G equipped for the Wild Weasel mission. The squadron upgraded to McDonnell F-4G Phantom IIs in 1980, and starting the following year trained electronic warfare officers in the Wild Weasel mission. It continued in this role until inactivating in June 1992. During Operation Desert Storm, the squadron deployed crews and aircraft to participate in combat operations.

=== Navigator training ===
The squadron was redesignated the 562nd Flying Training Squadron and activated at Randolph Air Force Base, Texas in May 1993 and assigned to the 12th Operations Group. the squadron operated the Boeing T-43 Bobcat to train navigators and naval flight officers in Joint Undergraduate Navigator Training until navigator training and electronic warfare officer training was combined into the Combat Systems Officer course and moved to Naval Air Station Pensacola, Florida. The squadron was inactivated in November 2010.

=== Electronic warfare ===
In January 2026, The Air Force announced plans to activate the 562nd Electronic Warfare Squadron at Nellis Air Force Base, Nevada later in the year. The squadron will be assigned to the 350th Spectrum Warfare Wing, and will be tasked to streamline electromagnetic spectrum operations at the Air Force Warfare Center. It will allow the center to deliver advanced, realistic training that incorporates electronic warfare concepts, tactics to enable operational units to better operate in contested electronic environments. Plans call for the squadron to be operational by the summer of 2026 and operating at full capacity by 2028.

== Lineage ==
- Constituted as the 562d Bombardment Squadron (Heavy) on 19 December 1942

Activated on 24 December 1942
Redesignated 562nd Bombardment Squadron, Heavy on 20 August 1943
Inactivated on 28 August 1945

- Redesignated 562nd Bombardment Squadron, Very Heavy on 5 May 1947

Activated in the reserve on 12 June 1947
Inactivated on 27 June 1949

- Redesignated 562nd Fighter-Bomber Squadron on 5 November 1953

Activated on 23 November 1953
Inactivated on 10 December 1957

- Redesignated 562nd Tactical Fighter Squadron and activated, on 1 May 1962 (not organized)

Organized on 1 October 1962
Inactivated on 31 July 1972

- Activated on 31 October 1974

Redesignated 562nd Tactical Fighter Training Squadron on 9 October 1980
Redesignated 562nd Fighter Squadron on 1 November 1991
Inactivated on 30 June 1992

- Redesignated 562nd Flying Training Squadron on 14 December 1992

Activated on 14 May 1993
Inactivated on 19 November 2010

=== Assignments ===
- 388th Bombardment Group, 24 December 1942 – 28 August 1945
- 338th Bombardment Group, 12 June 1947 – 27 June 1949
- 388th Fighter-Bomber Group, 23 November 1953 – 10 December 1957 (attached to 388th Fighter-Bomber Wing after 1 July 1957)
- Tactical Air Command, 1 May 1962 (not organized)
- 388th Tactical Fighter Wing, 1 October 1962
- 23rd Tactical Fighter Wing, 8 February 1964 (attached to 6235th Tactical Fighter Wing 6 August-7 November 1965; 355th Tactical Fighter Wing 8 November-c. 4 December 1965)
- 832nd Air Division, 1–31 July 1972
- 35th Tactical Fighter Wing, 31 October 1974
- 37th Tactical Fighter Wing, 30 March 1981
- 35th Tactical Fighter Wing, 5 October 1989 – 30 June 1992
- 12th Operations Group, 14 May 1993 – 19 November 2010

=== Stations ===
- Gowen Field, Idaho, 24 December 1942
- Wendover Field, Utah, 5 February 1943
- Sioux City Army Air Base, Iowa, 1 May-7 June 1943
- RAF Knettishall (Station 136), England, June 1943 – August 1945
- Sioux Falls Army Air Field, South Dakota, c. 13–28 August 1945
- Orchard Place Airport (later O'Hare International Airport), Illinois, 12 June 1947 – 27 June 1949
- Clovis Air Force Base, New Mexico, 23 November 1953 – 28 November 1954
- Spangdahlem Air Base, Germany, 12 December 1954
- Étain-Rouvres Air Base, France, c. 15 September 1955 – 10 December 1957
- McConnell Air Force Base, Kansas, 1 October 1962 – 31 July 1972 (deployed to Takhli Royal Thai Air Force Base, Thailand, 6 August-c. 4 December 1965)
- George Air Force Base, California, 31 October 1974 – 30 June 1992
- Randolph Air Force Base, Texas, 14 May 1993 – 19 November 2010

=== Aircraft ===
- Boeing B-17 Flying Fortress (1943–1945)
- North American AT-6 Texan (1947–1949)
- Beechcraft AT-11 Kansan (1947–1949)
- Curtiss C-46 Commando (1949)
- Douglas C-47 Skytrain (1949)
- Douglas B-26 Invader (1949)
- North American F-86 Sabre (1954–1956)
- North American F-100 Super Sabre (1957)
- Republic F-105 Thunderchief (c. 1963 - 1972, 1974–1980)
- McDonnell F-4 Phantom II (1980–1992)
- Boeing T-43 Bobcat (1993–2010)

=== Awards and campaigns ===
Award streamer	Award	Dates	Notes
	Distinguished Unit Citation	17 August 1943	Germany, 562d Bombardment Squadron
	Distinguished Unit Citation	26 July 1943, 12 May 1944, 21 June 1944	Hannover, Brux, England to Soviet Union, 562d Bombardment Squadron
	Air Force Outstanding Unit Award w/Combat "V" Device	13 August 1965-1 December 1965	562d Tactical Fighter Squadron
	Air Force Outstanding Unit Award	1 June 1970-15 June 1971	562d Tactical Fighter Squadron
	Air Force Outstanding Unit Award	2 February 1976-31 March 1977	562d Tactical Fighter Squadron
	Air Force Outstanding Unit Award	1 June 1985-31 May 1987	562d Tactical Fighter Squadron
	Air Force Outstanding Unit Award	1 March 1990-29 February 1992	562d Tactical Fighter Squadron
	Air Force Outstanding Unit Award	14 May 1993-30 June 1993	562d Flying Training Squadron
	Air Force Outstanding Unit Award	1 July 1993-30 June 1994	562d Flying Training Squadron
	Air Force Outstanding Unit Award	1 July 1995-30 June 1996	562d Flying Training Squadron
	Air Force Outstanding Unit Award	1 July 1996-30 June 1998	562d Flying Training Squadron
	Air Force Outstanding Unit Award	1 July 1998-30 June 2000	562d Flying Training Squadron
	Air Force Outstanding Unit Award	1 July 2002-30 June 2004	562d Flying Training Squadron

Campaign Streamer	Campaign	Dates	Notes
	Air Offensive, Europe	July 1943–5 June 1944	562d Bombardment Squadron
	Air Combat, EAME Theater	July 1943–11 May 1945	562d Bombardment Squadron
	Normandy	6 June 1944 – 24 July 1944	562d Bombardment Squadron
	Northern France	25 July 1944 – 14 September 1944	562d Bombardment Squadron
	Rhineland	15 September 1944 – 21 March 1945	562d Bombardment Squadron
	Ardennes-Alsace	16 December 1944 – 25 January 1945	562d Bombardment Squadron
	Central Europe	22 March 1944 – 21 May 1945	562d Bombardment Squadron
	Vietnam Defensive	6 August 1965 – 4 December 1965	562d Tactical Fighter Squadron

== See also ==
- B-17 Flying Fortress units of the United States Army Air Forces
- List of F-86 Sabre units
- List of F-100 units of the United States Air Force
- List of F-105 units of the United States Air Force
- List of F-4 Phantom II operators
