= 388th Operations Group =

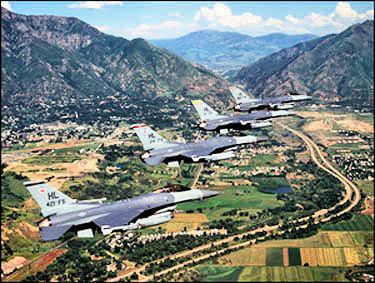
- Group F-16 Fighting Falcons
- Active: 1942–1945; 1953–1957; 1991–present
- Country: United States
- Branch: United States Air Force
- Mottos: Libertas vel Mors (Latin for 'Liberty or Death'); Fortress for Freedom (WW II)
- Decorations: Distinguished Unit Citation; Air Force Meritorious Unit Award; Air Force Outstanding Unit Award

Commanders
- Current commander: Col. Brad "Pedro" Bashore

Insignia
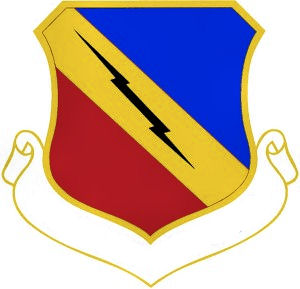
- 388th Operations Group emblem (Note: Approved 17 January 2008. Description: Per bend azure and gules, on a bend or, a lightning flash sable. Ravenstein, p. 211. While assigned to the 388th Wing, the group uses the wing emblem with the group designation on the scroll. AF Instruction 84-105, Organizational Lineage, Honors and History, 27 April 2017, paragraph 3.3.3.)

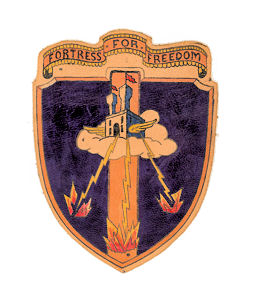
- 388th Bombardment Group
- Tail code: HL
- World War II tail marking: H within a square

The 388th Operations Group is the flying component of the 388th Fighter Wing, assigned to the Air Combat Command Twelfth Air Force. The group is stationed at Hill Air Force Base, Utah.

During World War II, its predecessor unit, the 388th Bombardment Group was an Eighth Air Force Boeing B-17 Flying Fortress unit in England, stationed at RAF Knettishall. The group earned four Distinguished Unit Citations, flying over 300 combat missions (17 August 1943 – Regensburg; 26 June 1943 – Hanover; 12 May 1944 – Brux and 21 June 1944 on a shuttle mission to Russia). It also conducted Aphroditie radio-controlled B-24 Liberators as test guided bombs.

== Mission ==
The 388th Operations Group is responsible for the readiness of a combat-capable fleet of 5th Generation F-35A Lightning II.

== Organization ==
Squadrons of the group are:

- 4th Fighter Squadron
- 34th Fighter Squadron
- 421st Fighter Squadron
- 388th Operations Support Squadron

== History ==
For additional history and lineage, see 388th Fighter Wing

=== World War II ===
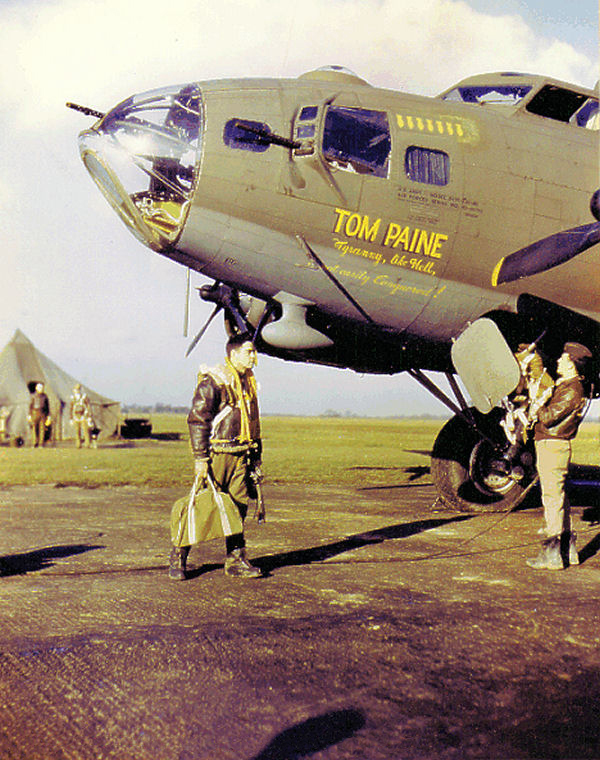
Boeing B-17F-90-BO Fortress Serial 42-30793

Activated on 24 December 1942 at Gowen Field in Idaho. Nucleus at Gowen moved to Wendover Field, Utah in early February 1943. Final training was conducted at Sioux City AAF SD from early May 1943 to 1 June 1943. The aircraft then began their overseas movement, taking the northern route via Newfoundland and Greenland, and finally from Iceland to Prestwick, Scotland. The ground unit left Sioux City on 12 June 1943 for Camp Kilmer, New Jersey and sailed on the Queen Elizabeth on 1 July 1943, arriving in Clyde on 7 July 1943. Assigned to the Eighth Air Force's 45th Combat Bombardment Wing. Its group tail code was a "Square-H".

The 388th BG began combat operations on 17 July 1943 by attacking an aircraft factory in Amsterdam. The unit functioned primarily as a strategic bombardment Organization until the war ended. Targets included industries, naval installations, oil storage plants, refineries, and communications centers in Germany, France, Poland, Belgium, Norway, Romania, and the Netherlands.

The group received a Distinguished Unit Citation for withstanding heavy opposition to bomb a vital aircraft factory at Regensburg on 17 August 1943. The 388th received another DUC for three outstanding missions: an attack against a tire and rubber factory in Hanover on 26 July 1943; the bombardment of a synthetic oil refinery in Brux on 12 May 1944; and a strike against a synthetic oil refinery at Ruhland on 21 June 1944, during a shuttle raid from England to Russia.

The unit attacked many other significant targets, including aircraft factories in Kassel, Reims, and Brunswick; airfields in Bordeaux, Paris, and Berlin; naval works at La Pallice, Emden, and Kiel; chemical industries in Ludwigshafen; ball-bearing plants in Schweinfurt; and marshalling yards in Brussels, Osnabrück, and Bielefeld. Operations also included support and interdictory missions. It helped prepare for the invasion of Normandy by attacking military installations in France, and on D-Day struck coastal guns, field batteries, and transportation. Continued to support ground forces during the campaign that followed, hitting such objectives as supply depots and troop concentrations. Bombed in support of ground forces at Saint-Lô in July 1944 and at Caen in August. Covered the airborne assault on the Netherlands in September 1944 by attacking military installations and airfields at Arnhem. Aided the final drive through Germany during the early months of 1945 by striking targets such as marshalling yards, rail bridges, and road junctions.

Altogether the 388th flew 331 raids to European targets including nineteen Operation Aphrodite missions from nearby RAF Fersfield. After V-E Day, the group flew food to the Netherlands to relieve flood-stricken areas.

Redeployed to the US from June to August 1945 . The aircraft left RAF Knettishall between 9 June 1945 and July 1945. The ground unit sailed on the Queen Elizabeth from Greenock on 5 August 1945 and arrived in New York on 11 August 1945. The group was established at Sioux Falls AAF, South Dakota, and was inactivated there on 28 August 1945.

=== Cold War ===
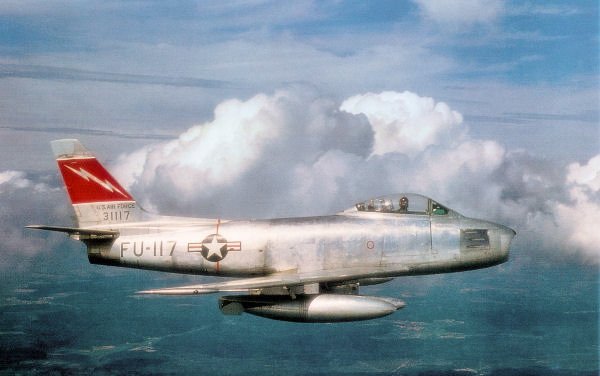
North American F-86F-35-NA Sabre Serial 53-1117 of the 563d TFS. In 1957 this aircraft was transferred to the Norwegian Air Force

The unit was reactivated as a fighter-bomber group in 1953 and equipped with F-86s. It was deployed to France from Clovis AFB, New Mexico in December 1954.

The mission of the 388th FBG was to train for and conduct tactical nuclear weapons delivery. Its secondary mission was to conduct non-atomic tactical air operations. Upon arrival of 388th Wing Headquarters at Etain, the construction delays and other problems seriously hampered the ability of the Wing to use the base for its flying operations. The 562nd FBS was forced to operate from Spangdahlem Air Base, the 563rd from Bitburg Air Base and the 561st from Hahn Air Base in West Germany for the winter of 1954–55.

In April and May 1955, rotational deployments to Wheelus Air Base, Libya began for their first gunnery and bombing training since their arrival in Europe. In the fall, with enough facilities construction completed, the three flying squadrons were transferred from Germany and took up their home assignment at Étain.

On 22 November 1955, Det #1, 388th FBG was activated at Hahn Air Base to stand nuclear alert with the Wing's F-86's. Personnel and aircraft primarily came from the 561st FBS. In February 1956 the detachment was transferred to more spacious facilities at Spangdahlem Air Base. Rotational deployments of 8 F-86's and support personnel to Germany continued until the fall of 1957 when the 388th was inactivated.

In the fall of 1956 the 388th began planning for conversion to the F-100D/F "Super Sabre" Due to the adverse flying conditions at Etain for conversion training, the new aircraft were deployed to Nouasseur Air Base in Morocco, with the squadrons deploying their F-86's to Nouasseur, then returning to France or Spangdahlem in their new F-100s for Zulu Alert duties.

During this transition period, the 388th experienced a significant personnel crisis, with many of its officers and NCO's completing their two-year unaccompanied tour in France. The personnel problem became worse in the fall of 1957 with many single airmen completing their three years of overseas service and were rotating back to the United States (CONUS). The manning of the 388th fell to about 65 percent when on 8 December 1957 HQ USAFE inactivated the 388th FBG due to budgetary and personnel constraints. On 9 December the personnel and assets of the 388th were transferred to the 49th Fighter-Bomber Group.

=== Reactivation ===
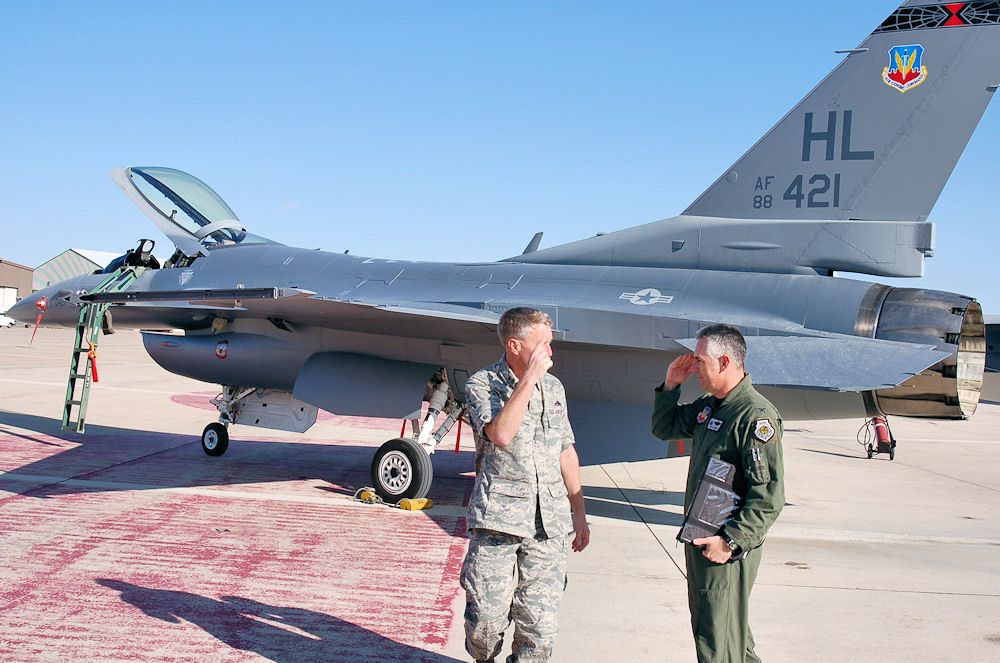
The final 388th Fighter Wing Block 40 F-16 to undergo Common Configuration Implementation Program upgrades is handed over to Col. Scott Dennis (right), 388th FW commander

On 1 December 1991, the 388th Operations Group was activated as a result of the 388th Tactical Fighter Wing implementing the USAF Objective Wing organization. Upon activation, the 388th OG was bestowed the lineage and history of the 388th Tactical Fighter Group and all predecessor organizations. In addition, the 388th OG was assigned the flying squadrons of the redesignated 388th Fighter Wing.

The group had a continuing commitment of approximately six months per year to Operation Southern Watch, protecting the no-fly zone south of the 33rd parallel in Iraq. The 729th ACS also had a continuous presence in South America supporting the war on drugs.

The 388th OG flew the F-16's 5 millionth flying hour at Hill Air Force Base 4 December 1996.

In its 2005 BRAC Recommendations, DoD recommended to close Cannon Air Force Base, New Mexico. As a result, it would distribute the 27th Fighter Wing's F-16s to 388th OG at Hill AFB (six aircraft) and several other installations.

In September 2017 the group's last F-16 Fighting Falcon departed for Holloman Air Force Base as the group completed the replacement of its F-16s with the new F-35 Lightning II.

== Lineage ==
- Established as the 388th Bombardment Group (Heavy) on 19 December 1942

Activated on 24 December 1942
Redesignated 388th Bombardment Group, Heavy on 20 August 1943
Inactivated on 28 August 1945

- Redesignated 388th Fighter-Bomber Group on 5 November 1953

Activated on 23 November 1953
Inactivated on 10 December 1957

- Redesignated 388th Tactical Fighter Group on 31 July 1985 (Remained inactive)
- Redesignated 388th Operations Group and activated on 1 December 1991

=== Assignments ===
- II Bomber Command, 24 December 1942
- Eighth Air Force, c. 6 July 1943
- VIII Bomber Command, 10 July 1943
- 4th Bombardment Wing (attached to 403 Provisional Combat Wing Bombardment after 13 July 1943)
- 3d Bombardment Division, 13 September 1943
- 45th Combat Bombardment Wing, 14 September 1943
- 20th Bombardment Wing, 18 June 1945
- Second Air Force, 13–28 August 1945
- 388th Fighter-Bomber Wing, 23 November 1953 – 10 December 1957
- 388th Fighter Wing, 1 December 1991 – present

=== Components ===
- 4th Fighter Squadron: 1 December 1991–present
- 34th Fighter Squadron: 1 December 1991 – 16 July 2010, 17 July 2015-
- 421st Fighter Squadron: 1 December 1991–present
- 560th Bombardment Squadron: 24 December 1942 – 28 August 1945
- 561st Bombardment Squadron (later 561st Fighter-Bomber Squadron): 24 December 1942 – 28 August 1945; 23 November 1953 – 10 December 1957
- 562d Bombardment Squadron (later 562d Fighter-Bomber Squadron): 24 December 1942 – 28 August 1945; 23 November 1953 – 10 December 1957
- 563d Bombardment Squadron (later 563d Fighter-Bomber Squadron): 24 December 1942 – 28 August 1945; 23 November 1953 – 10 December 1957

=== Stations ===
- Gowen Field, Idaho, 24 December 1942
- Wendover Field, Utah, 1 February 1943
- Sioux City Army Air Base, Iowa, 29 April – 10 June 1943
- RAF Knettishall (AAF-136), England, c. 6 July 1943 – 4 August 1945
- Sioux Falls Army Air Field, South Dakota, 13–28 August 1945
- Clovis Air Force Base, New Mexico, 23 November 1953 – 28 November 1954
- Étain-Rouvres Air Base, France, 12 December 1954 – 10 December 1957
- Hill Air Force Base, Utah, 1 December 1991–present

=== Aircraft ===
- B-17 Flying Fortress, 1943–1945
- F-86 Sabre, 1954–1956
- F-100 Super Sabre, 1957
- F-16 Falcon, 1991–2017
- F-35 Lightning II, 2015–present
