= List of F-105 units of the United States Air Force =

== Active duty ==
- 4th Tactical Fighter Wing, Seymour Johnson AFB
  - 333d Tactical Fighter Squadron 1960–1970
  - 334th Tactical Fighter Squadron 1959–1966
  - 335th Tactical Fighter Squadron 1959–1966
  - 336th Tactical Fighter Squadron 1959–1966
- 8th Tactical Fighter Wing, Itazuke AB
  - 35th Tactical Fighter Squadron 1963–1967
  - 36th Tactical Fighter Squadron 1963–1967
  - 80th Tactical Fighter Squadron 1963–1967
- 18th Tactical Fighter Wing, Kadena AB
  - 12th Tactical Fighter Squadron 1962–1972
  - 44th Tactical Fighter Squadron 1963–1970
  - 67th Tactical Fighter Squadron 1962–1967
- 23d Tactical Fighter Wing, McConnell AFB
  - 560th Tactical Fighter Squadron 1963–1968
  - 561st Tactical Fighter Squadron 1963–1978
  - 562d Tactical Fighter Squadron 1963–1980
  - 563d Tactical Fighter Squadron 1963–1972
- 36th Tactical Fighter Wing, Bitburg AB
  - 22d Tactical Fighter Squadron 1961–1966
  - 23d Tactical Fighter Squadron 1961–1966
  - 53d Tactical Fighter Squadron 1961–1966
- 49th Tactical Fighter Wing, Spangdahlem AB
  - 7th Tactical Fighter Squadron 1962–1966
  - 8th Tactical Fighter Squadron 1962–1967
  - 9th Tactical Fighter Squadron 1962–1967
- 355th Tactical Fighter Wing, McConnell AFB
  - 354th Tactical Fighter Squadron 1962–1965
  - 357th Tactical Fighter Squadron 1964–1966
  - 421st Tactical Fighter Squadron 1962–1965
  - 469th Tactical Fighter Squadron 1964–1965
- 355th Tactical Fighter Wing, Takhli RTAFB
  - 333rd Tactical Fighter Squadron 1965–1970
  - 354th Tactical Fighter Squadron 1965–1970
  - 357th Tactical Fighter Squadron 1966–1970
- 388th Tactical Fighter Wing, Korat RTAFB
  - 13th Tactical Fighter Squadron 1966–1967
  - 17th Wild Weasel Squadron 1971–1974
  - 34th Tactical Fighter Squadron 1966–1969
  - 6010th Wild Weasel Squadron 1970–1971
- United States Air Force Thunderbirds, Nellis Air Force Base 1963-1964

== Air National Guard ==
Wing	Squadron	Location	Identifying Features	Variants	Service Dates
108 TFG	141 TFS	McGuire AFB	Air Guard logo, w/white or black "NEW JERSEY" with AFOUA	F-105B	1964–1981
113 TFG	121 TFS	Andrews AFB	Thin blue strip w/white borders and "DISTRICT OF COLUMBIA" and 121st TFS logo below cockpit	F-105D/F	1971–1981
116 TFG	128 TFS	Dobbins AFB	Yellow canopy rails and yellow band w/white borders on tail fin, with "sharkmouth" nose	F-105G	1979–1983
177 TFG	119 TFS	Atlantic City IAP	Thin red band on tail fin w/119th TFS logo on fuselage	F-105B	1970–1973
184 TFTG	127 TFTS	McConnell AFB	Red tail stripe w/white trim, red canopy stills and radar reflector, Air Guard badge in middle of tail	F-105D/F	1971–1979
192 TFG	149 TFS	Byrd ANGB	Yellow tail stripe w/white trim and black lightning bolt, Air Guard badge and "VIRGINIA" in center of tail	F-105D/F	1971–1982

== Air Force Reserve ==
Wing	Squadron	Location	Tailcode	Identifying Features	Variants	Service Dates	Notes
301st TFW	457th TFS	Carswell AFB	"TH"	Red canopy rails, red tail band w/white trim, map of Texas, "AFRES"	F-105D/F	1972–1982
419th TFW	466th TFS	Hill AFB	"HI"	Yellow canopy rail, nose stripe, tail stripe w/white trim, rattlesnake emblem	F-105B/D/F	1982–1984
507th TFG	305th TFS	Tinker AFB	"UC"	Blue Tail band w/white "SOONERS"	F-105D/F	1972–1980	Renamed 465th TFS
	465th TFS	Tinker AFB	"SH"	Blue Tail band w/white "SOONERS"	F-105D/F	1972–1980
508th TFW	466th TFS	Hill AFB	"HI"	Yellow canopy rail, nose stripe, tail stripe w/white trim, rattlesnake emblem	F-105B/D/F	1973–1982	Renamed 419th TFW

== See also ==
- F-105 Thunderchief
- List of surviving Republic F-105 Thunderchiefs
- Wild Weasel
