= 561st Weapons Squadron =

561st Weapons Squadron

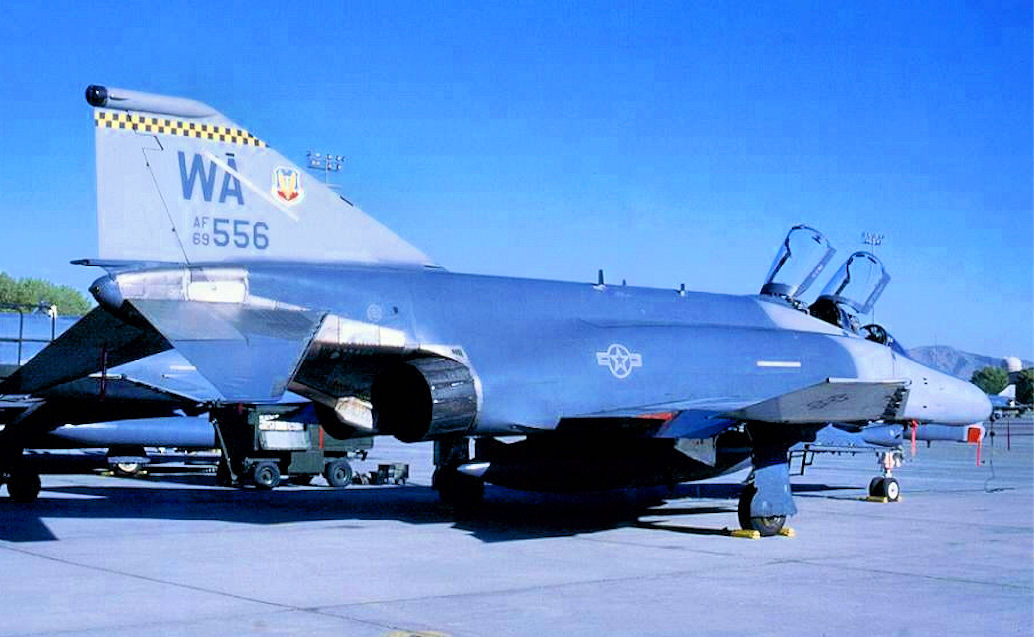
- 561st F-4G Wild Weasel F-4 Phantom II (Note: This aircraft was built as McDonnell F-4E-44-MC Phantom II, serial 69-7566. It was converted to F-4G Wild Weasel configuration in May 1978. It was transferred to the Aerospace Maintenance and Regeneration Center on 21 November 1991, then converted to QF-4G drone. Expended in a missile test 26 June 2003. Baugher, Joe (12 April 2023). "1969 USAF Serial Numbers". Joe Baugher.)
- Active: 1942–1945; 1947–1949; 1953–1957; 1962–1992; 1993–1996; 2007–present
- Country: United States
- Branch: United States Air Force
- Role: Tactics development
- Part of: Air Combat Command
- Garrison/HQ: Nellis Air Force Base
- Nickname: Smug Tigers (1953–1957) Black Knights
- Engagements: World War II; Vietnam War; Desert Storm; Operation Provide Comfort; Operation Southern Watch; Operation Vigilant Warrior
- Decorations: Distinguished Unit Citation; Air Force Outstanding Unit Award with Combat "V" Device; Air Force Outstanding Unit AwardAir Force Meritorious Unit Award Republic of Vietnam Gallantry Cross with Palm

Insignia
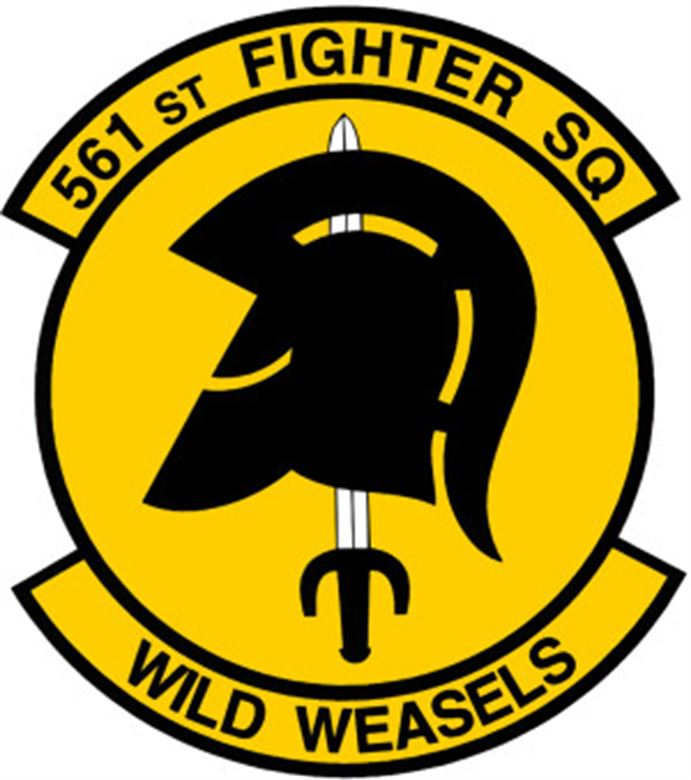
- 561st Weapons Squadron emblem (Note: Approved 13 October 1993. Modified to reflect current name and "Black Knights" nickname, 30 July 2919.)

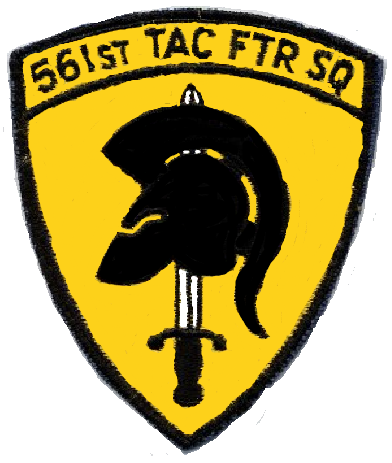
- 561st Tactical Fighter Squadron emblem (Note: This emblem was used by the squadron from about 1963, but apparently never officially approved until it was placed on a disc in 1993. Endicott, p. 864 (1993 emblem replaced 1955 emblem).)

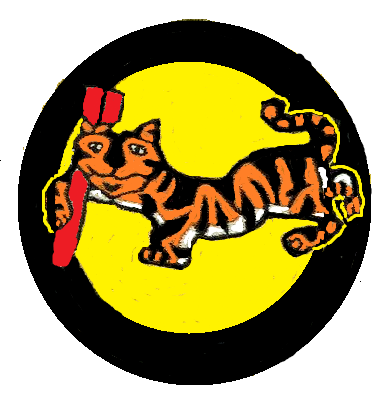
- 561st Fighter-Bomber Squadron emblem (Note: Approved 31 January 1955. Description: On a disc light yellow, with wide border black, a caricatured "Smug Tiger" courant proper (orange with white and black markings), carrying a bomb red in his right forepaw.)

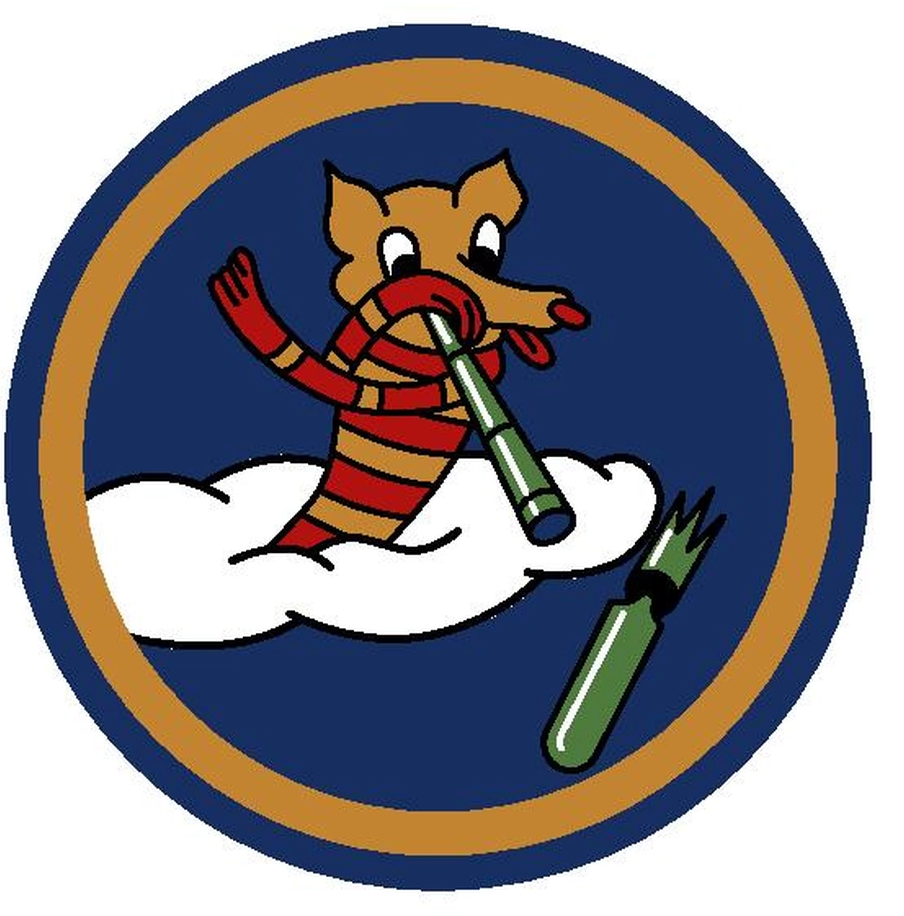
- 561st Bombardment Squadron emblem

The 561st Weapons Squadron is a United States Air Force squadron assigned to the USAF Weapons School at Nellis Air Force Base, Nevada. The squadron was the last United States Air Force unit to fly the McDonnell F-4 Phantom II on operational missions. The last Republic F-105 Thunderchief shot down in the Vietnam War was from the 561st.

The squadron was originally activated during World War II as the 561st Bombardment Squadron. After training in the United States, it deployed to the European Theater of Operations, where it participated in the strategic bombing campaign against Germany. The squadron was twice awarded the Distinguished Unit Citation for its combat actions. Following V-E Day, it returned to the United States and was inactivated. The squadron was briefly active in the reserve in the late 1940s, but does not appear to have been fully manned or equipped.

The squadron was redesignated the 561st Fighter-Bomber Squadron and activated in 1953. It moved to Europe, but was inactivated in 1957, when it was replaced by another unit. It was activated again as the 561st Tactical Fighter Squadron in 1962. It conducted frequent deployments, but focused on training pilots for operations in Southeast Asia. Elements of the squadron participated in combat there, although the squadron remained in the United States. From 1973, it conducted Wild Weasel training. It deployed crews and planes to Southwest Asia during Desert Storm and maintained elements there until inactivating in 1996. It was activated in its current role in 2007.

== Mission ==
The 561st provides information on tactical lessons learned and current tactics, techniques and procedures to ensure that training contributes to increased readiness and. It is the focal point for a process that collects, vets, disseminates, and integrates relevant and timely information and is a central source for current tactical doctrine and tactical resources.

== History ==
=== World War II ===
==== Initial training and deployment ====
The 561st was first activated as the 561st Bombardment Squadron at Gowen Field, Idaho, one of the four original squadrons of the 388th Bombardment Group, in December 1942. The cadre that formed at Gowen moved to Wendover Field, Utah in February 1943, where the unit was fully manned and squadron training with Boeing B-17 Flying Fortress heavy bombers began. Training continued until June 1943, when it deployed to England. The air echelon ferried its B-17s to England via the northern ferry route, while the ground echelon departed for Camp Kilmer, New Jersey, the port of embarkation, sailing in the RMS Queen Elizabeth on 1 July.

==== Combat in Europe ====
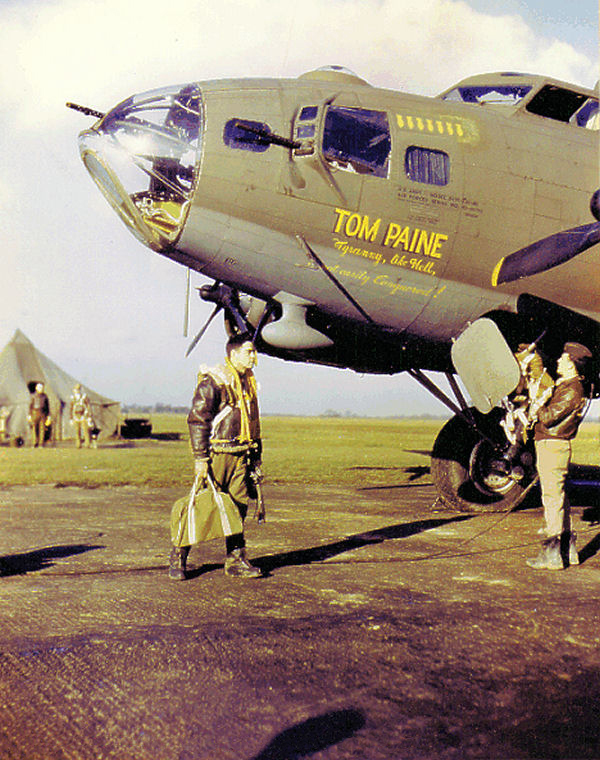
388th Group B-17 in England (Note: Aircraft is Boeing B-17F-120-BO Flying Fortress, serial 42-30793, Tom Paine. It flew its last combat mission on 29 December 1944. Baugher, Joe (10 April 2023). "1942 USAF Serial Numbers". Joe Baugher.)

The squadron assembled at RAF Knettishall, its combat station, and flew its first combat mission on 17 July, when it attacked an aircraft factory in Amsterdam. The squadron primarily engaged in the strategic bombing campaign against Germany, attacking industrial sites, oil refineries and storage facilities, communications centers and naval targets on the European Continent.

The squadron was awarded a Distinguished Unit Citation (DUC) for attacking an aircraft factory at Regensburg, Germany, on 17 August 1943, withstanding heavy resistance to reach the target. It was awarded a second DUC for three separate missions: an earlier attack on a tire and rubber factory in Hanover, Germany on 26 July 1943 and two missions in 1944, one against synthetic oil refineries near Brüx, Germany (Note: Now Most, Czech Republic.) on 12 May and at Ruhland, Germany on 21 June. This last attack was on a shuttle bombing mission from England to Germany to Poltava, USSR, (Note: Now in Ukraine.) to Foggia, Italy, and back to England. Other strategic targets included aircraft factories at Brunswick, Kassel, and Reims; airfields at Paris, Berlin and in Bordeaux; naval installations at Emden, Kiel and La Pallice, chemical works in Ludwigshafen; ball bearing factories at Schweinfurt and rail marshalling yards in Bielefeld, Brussels, and Osnabruck.

The squadron was occasionally diverted from the strategic campaign to perform air support and interdiction missions. It attacked military installations in France in early 1944 to help prepare the way for Operation Overlord, the invasion of Normandy, and on D Day hit coastal defenses, artillery batteries and transportation targets. It attacked troop concentrations and supply depots. In July 1944, it supported Operation Cobra at Saint Lo and the following month attacked targets in Caen. It struck military installations and airfields near Arnhem during Operation Market Garden, the unsuccessful attempt to secure a bridgehead across the Rhine in the Netherlands. It attacked transportation targets to support the final drive through Germany in early 1945.

==== Return and inactivation ====
The squadron flew its last combat mission in April 1945. After V-E Day, the squadron flew missions to the Netherlands to drop food in flooded areas. It then began redeploying to the United States. Its aircraft left Knettishall between 9 June and 5 July 1945. The ground echelon sailed again on the Queen Elizabeth on 5 August. The squadron inactivated at Sioux Falls Army Air Field, South Dakota on 28 August 1945.

=== Air reserve ===
The squadron was activated in the reserves at Orchard Place Airport, Illinois on 12 June 1947 and assigned to the 338th Bombardment Group. The squadron trained under the supervision of Air Defense Command (ADC)'s 141st AAF Base Unit (Reserve Training) (later the 2471st Air Force Reserve Flying Training Center), although it does not appear that it was fully manned or equipped.

In July 1948 Continental Air Command (ConAC) assumed responsibility for managing reserve and Air National Guard units from ADC. ConAC moved the squadron to General Mitchell Field, Wisconsin in September 1948. The 561st was inactivated when President Truman's reduced 1949 defense budget required reductions in the number of units in the Air Force, With the squadron's inactivation reserve flying operations at Mitchell ended until 1952, when the 438th Troop Carrier Wing was activated there.

=== Fighter operations in Europe ===
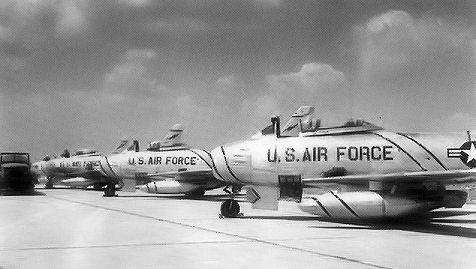
388th Wing F-86Fs at Etain-Rouvres AB

The squadron was redesignated the 561st Fighter-Bomber Squadron and activated at Clovis Air Force Base, New Mexico in November 1953. The squadron was equipped with North American F-86F Sabres, with a capability of carrying nuclear weapons. A year after activation, in November 1954, the squadron was transferred to United States Air Forces Europe and departed, along with other elements of the 388th Fighter-Bomber Wing, for Étain-Rouvres Air Base, France. However, construction at Etain was not far enough advanced to permit it to accept fighter aircraft, and only the wing headquarters settled in to the base. Instead, the squadron ferried their Sabres to Hahn Air Base, Germany, arriving the following month.

Little flying was done in the squadron's first winter in Europe due to weather. It deployed to Wheelus Air Base, Libya in April 1955, where it was able to train in gunnery and bombing for the first time since arriving in Europe. The squadron was the last of the wing's operational units to rejoin the wing at its permanent base in France. Starting in November 1955, the squadron provided support for Detachment 1 of the 388th Wing at Hahn, and deployed there to stand nuclear alert. The detachment moved to Spangdahlem Air Base, Germany in February 1956.

In August 1956, the squadron began training to convert to the North American F-100 Super Sabre. The conversion was completed by May 1957. However, the squadron flew the "Hun" for less than a year. On 10 December 1957, the 49th Fighter-Bomber Wing moved from Japan on paper to replace the 388th Wing, The 561st was inactivated and its mission, personnel and aircraft transferred to the 7th Fighter-Bomber Squadron.

=== F-105 fighter operations ===
The squadron was redesignated the 561st Tactical Fighter Squadron and organized at McConnell Air Force Base, Kansas in October 1962 and assigned to the 388th Tactical Fighter Wing. In February 1964, the 388th was replaced at McConnell by the 23d Tactical Fighter Wing. The 561st was equipped with the Republic F-105 Thunderchief. The squadron conducted tactical operations and training in preparation for global deployment and deployed to Yokota Air Base, Japan in 1965. After 1966, the squadron conducted replacement training in the F-105, conducting frequent deployments to George Air Force Base, California.

=== Wild Weasel operations ===
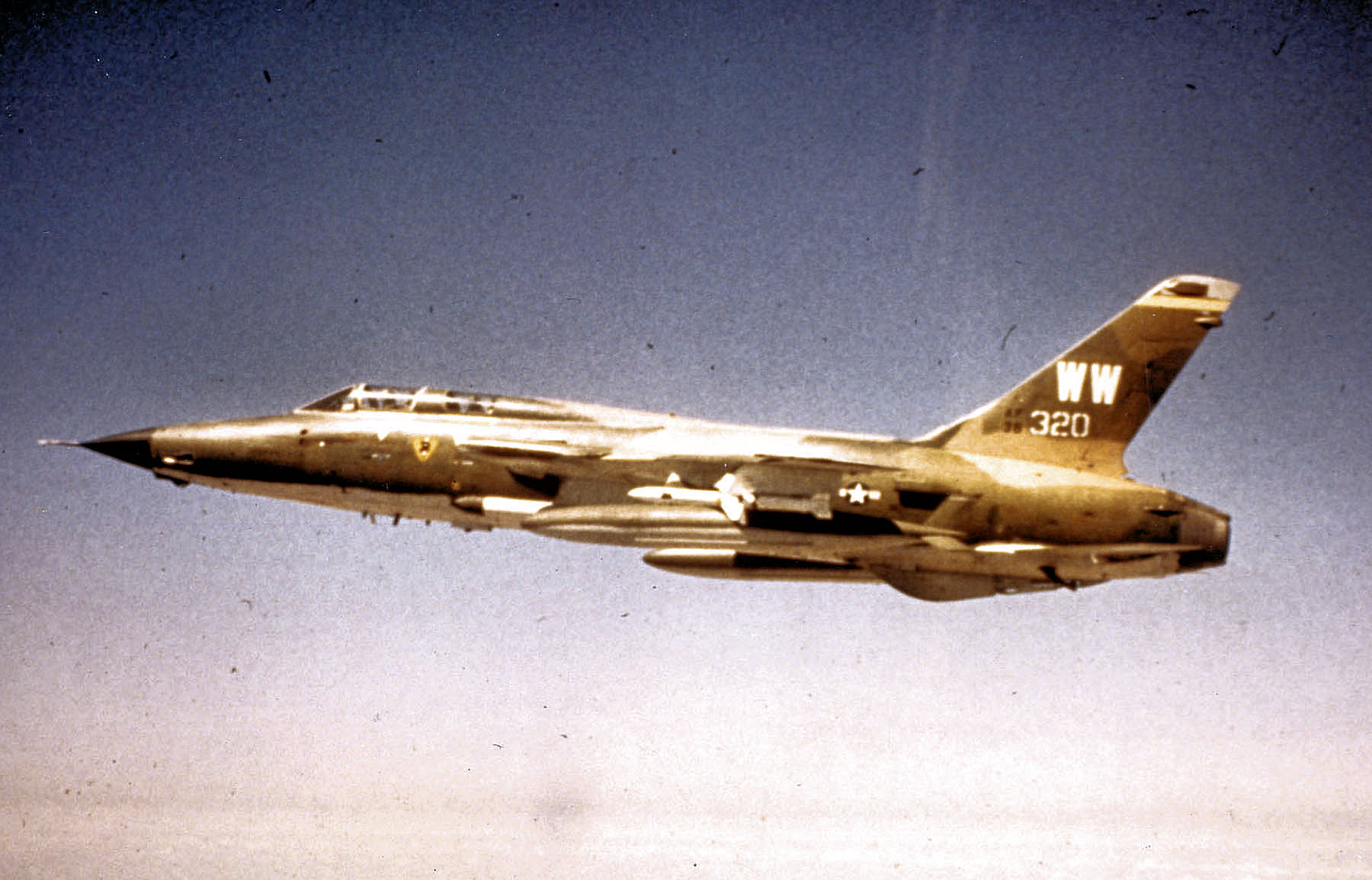
561st Tactical Fighter Squadron F-105G over Southeast Asia in the summer of 1972 (Note: This plane was built as Republic F-105F-1-RE Thunderchief, serial 63-8320. It was converted to an EF-105F in 1970 and to an F-105G in 1972. It was flown to Wright-Patterson Air Force Base, Ohio and is on display at the National Museum of the United States Air Force. Baugher, Joe (21 April 2023). "1963 USAF Serial Numbers". Joe Baugher. "Factsheets: Republic F-105G Thunderchief". National Museum of the Air Force. 15 May 2015.)

Wild Weasel operations became the squadron's primary mission in mid-1970, when the squadron exchanged its single seat F-105s for two seat F-105G Thunderchiefs. In April 1972, the squadron established Detachment 1 at Korat Royal Thai Air Force Base, Thailand and flew combat Wild Weasel missions. The detachment was discontinued in September, but crews and planes of the squadron continued to fly missions until late January 1973. The squadron was awarded the Air Force Outstanding Unit Award with "V" Device and the Vietnamese Gallantry Cross with Palm for this period. A plane from the 561st was the last F-105 shot down in the Vietnam War. (Note: This plane was Republic F-105G Thunderchief, serial 63-8359, also built as an F-105F-1-RE. Baugher, 1963 USAF Serial Numbers.) It was hit by a surface-to-air-missile on 16 November 1972; the crew was rescued.

On 1 July 1973, the 561st moved to George Air Force Base and joined the 35th Tactical Fighter Wing. At George, the squadron mission was primarily the training of Wild Weasel crews. The squadron continued to fly the F-105G until 1980, when it began transitioning into the McDonnell F-4G Phantom II advanced Wild Weasel, completing the transition the following year. In August 1990, the Wild Weasels deployed to Sheikh Isa Air Base, Bahrain and during Operation Desert Storm flew over 2,400 sorties logging more than 8,000 combat hours. After the war, the squadron was inactivated on 30 June 1992.

The squadron was activated at Nellis Air Force Base as part of the 57th Operations Group on 1 February 1993. the 561st soon deployed to Incirlik Air Base in support of Operation Provide Comfort and returned to Southwest Asia at Dhahran Air Base in Saudi Arabia, supporting Operation Southern Watch and Operation Vigilant Warrior. The 561st was also employed as an "Aggressor" squadron during RED FLAG exercises. In 1994, the 561st became the largest fighter squadron in the United States Air Force. It maintained a continuous deployment to the Middle East until inactivating in October 1996.

=== Joint tactics ===
The squadron was redesignated the 561st Joint Tactics Squadron and activated at Nellis in May 2007 in its current role. It was reassigned to the USAF Weapons School and renamed the 561st Weapons Squadron in July 2019.

== Lineage ==
- Constituted as the 561st Bombardment Squadron (Heavy) on 19 December 1942

Activated on 24 December 1942
Redesignated 561st Bombardment Squadron, Heavy on 20 August 1943
Inactivated on 28 August 1945

- Redesignated 561st Bombardment Squadron, Very Heavy on 5 May 1947

Activated in the reserve on 12 June 1947
Inactivated on 27 June 1949

- Redesignated 561st Fighter-Bomber Squadron on 5 November 1953

Activated on 23 November 1953
Inactivated on 10 December 1957

- Redesignated 561st Tactical Fighter Squadron and activated on 1 May 1962 (not organized)

Organized on 1 October 1962
Redesignated 561st Fighter Squadron on 1 November 1991
Inactivated on 30 June 1992

- Activated on 1 February 1993

Inactivated on 1 October 1996

- Redesignated 561st Joint Tactics Squadron on 1 May 2007

Activated on 22 May 2007

- Redesignated 561st Weapons Squadron on 16 July 2019

=== Assignments ===
- 388th Bombardment Group, 24 December 1942 – 28 August 1945
- 338th Bombardment Group, 12 June 1947 – 27 June 1949
- 388th Fighter-Bomber Group, 23 November 1953 – 10 December 1957 (attached to 388th Fighter-Bomber Wing after 1 July 1957)
- Tactical Air Command, 1 May 1962 (not organized)
- 388th Tactical Fighter Wing, 1 October 1962
- 23d Tactical Fighter Wing, 8 February 1964 (attached to 41st Air Division, 6 March – 8 July 1965)
- 832d Air Division, 1 July 1972 (attached to 35th Tactical Fighter Wing)
- 35th Tactical Fighter Wing, 15 July 1973
- 37th Tactical Fighter Wing, 30 March 1981
- 35th Tactical Fighter Wing (later 35th Fighter Wing), 5 October 1989 – 30 June 1992 (attached to 35th Tactical Fighter Wing, Provisional, 16 August 1990 – March 1991)
- 57th Operations Group, 1 February 1993 – 1 October 1996
- United States Air Force Warfare Center, 22 May 2007
- 57th Wing, 14 February 2010
- USAF Weapons School, 16 July 2019 – present

=== Stations ===
- Gowen Field, Idaho, 24 December 1942
- Wendover Field, Utah, c. 1 February 1943
- Sioux City Army Air Base, Iowa, 1 May – 7 June 1943
- RAF Knettishall (AAF-136), England, June 1943-c. 6 August 1945
- Sioux Falls Army Air Field, South Dakota, c. 13–28 August 1945
- Orchard Place Airport, Illinois, 12 June 1947
- General Mitchell Field, Wisconsin, 2 September 1948 – 27 June 1949
- Clovis Air Force Base, New Mexico, 23 November 1953 – 28 November 1954
- Hahn Air Base, Germany, 12 December 1954
- Étain-Rouvres Air Base, France, 1 December 1955 – 10 December 1957
- McConnell Air Force Base, Kansas, 1 October 1962

Deployed to Yokota Air Base, Japan, 6 March – 8 July 1965. deployed to George Air Force Base, California, 16–26 May 1966, 23 September – 17 October 1966, 17 February – 9 March 1967, 4–18 August 1967, 23 January – 8 February 1968, 18 June – 3 July 1968, 15–27 November 1968, 6–21 May 1969, and 12 November-c. 2 December 1969

- George Air Force Base, California, 1 July 1973 – 30 June 1992

Deployed at: Sheik Isa Air Base, Bahrain, 16 August 1990 – March 1991

- Nellis Air Force Base, Nevada, 1 February 1993 – 1 October 1996
- Nellis Air Force Base, Nevada, 22 May 2007 – present

=== Aircraft ===
- Boeing B-17 Flying Fortress, 1943–1945
- North American F-86 Sabre, 1954–1956
- North American F-100 Super Sabre, 1957
- Republic F-105 Thunderchief, 1964–1980
- McDonnell F-4 Phantom II, 1981–1992, 1993–1996

=== Awards and campaigns ===
Award streamer	Award	Dates	Notes
	Distinguished Unit Citation	17 August 1943	Germany, 561st Bombardment Squadron
	Distinguished Unit Citation	26 July 1943, 12 May 1944, 21 June 1944	Hannover, Brux, England to Soviet Union, 561st Bombardment Squadron
	Air Force Outstanding Unit Award w/Combat "V" Device	6 April 1972 – 27 January 1973	561st Tactical Fighter Squadron
	Air Force Meritorious Unit Award	22 May 2007 – 31 May 2008	561st Joint Tactics Squadron
	Air Force Outstanding Unit Award	1 June 1970 – 15 June 1971	561st Tactical Fighter Squadron
	Air Force Outstanding Unit Award	2 February 1976 – 31 March 1977	561st Tactical Fighter Squadron
	Air Force Outstanding Unit Award	1 June 1985 – 31 May 1987	561st Tactical Fighter Squadron
	Air Force Outstanding Unit Award	1 March 1990 – 29 Feb 1992	561st Tactical Fighter Squadron (later 561st Fighter Squadron)
	Air Force Outstanding Unit Award	1 June 2010 – 31 May 2012	561st Joint Tactics Squadron
	Air Force Outstanding Unit Award	1 June 2012 – 31 May 2013	561st Joint Tactics Squadron
	Vietnamese Gallantry Cross with Palm	1 April 1966 – 28 January 1973	561st Tactical Fighter Squadron

Campaign Streamer	Campaign	Dates	Notes
	Air Offensive, Europe	July 1943 – 5 June 1944	561st Bombardment Squadron
	Air Combat, EAME Theater	July 1943 – 11 May 1945	561st Bombardment Squadron
	Normandy	6 June 1944 – 24 July 1944	561st Bombardment Squadron
	Northern France	25 July 1944 – 14 September 1944	561st Bombardment Squadron
	Rhineland	15 September 1944 – 21 March 1945	561st Bombardment Squadron
	Ardennes-Alsace	16 December 1944 – 25 January 1945	561st Bombardment Squadron
	Central Europe	22 March 1944 – 21 May 1945	561st Bombardment Squadron
	Defense of Saudi Arabia	2 August 1990 – 16 January 1991	561st Tactical Fighter Squadron
	Liberation and Defense of Kuwait	17 January 1991 – 11 April 1991	561st Tactical Fighter Squadron
	Southwest Asia Cease-Fire	12 April 1991 – 30 November 1995	561st Tactical Fighter Squadron (later 561st Fighter Squadron)
	Global War on Terror Service Medal	1 May 2007 –	561st Joint Tactics Squadron

== See also ==
- Wild Weasel
- List of United States Air Force squadrons
- List of Wings of the United States Air Force
- B-17 Flying Fortress units of the United States Army Air Forces
- List of F-86 Sabre units
- List of F-100 units of the United States Air Force
- List of F-105 units of the United States Air Force
- List of F-4 Phantom II operators
