= 560th Flying Training Squadron =

560th Flying Training Squadron

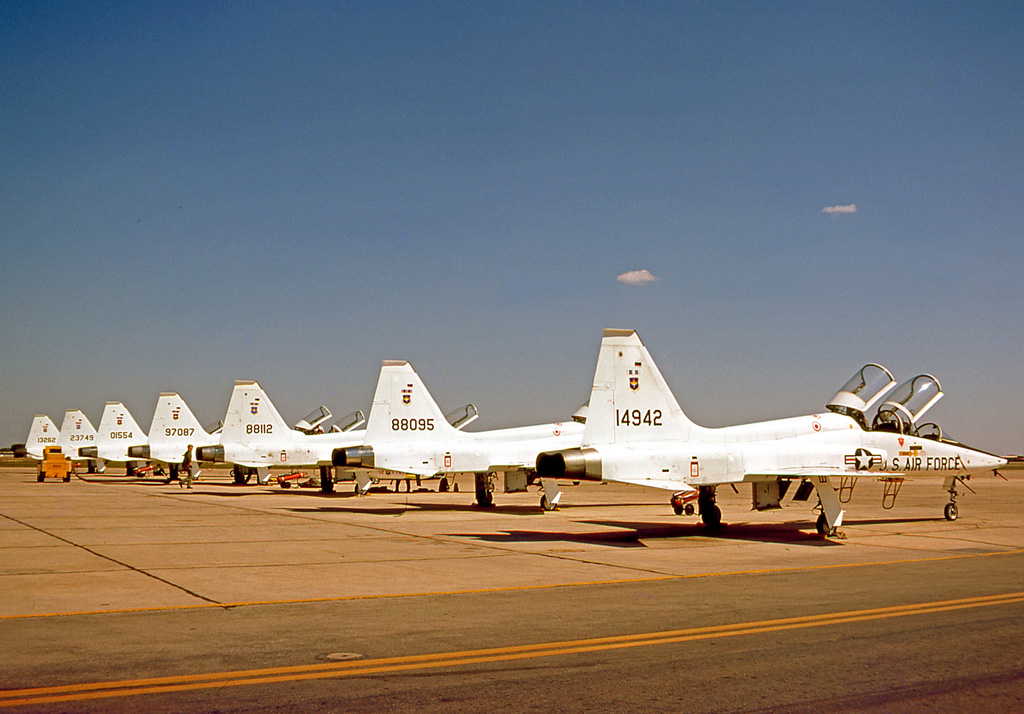
- 560th Northrop T-38 Talons at Randolph AFB in 1975 (Note: In foreground is Northrop T38A-70-NO Talon, serial 67-14942. Baugher, Joe (20 April 2023). "1967 USAF Serial Numbers". Joe Baugher.)
- Active: 1942–1945; 1947–1949; 1962–1970; 1972-2025
- Country: United States
- Branch: United States Air Force
- Role: Pilot training
- Part of: Air Education and Training Command
- Garrison/HQ: Randolph Air Force Base
- Nickname: Chargin' Cheetahs
- Engagements: European Theater of Operations
- Decorations: Distinguished Unit Citation; Air Force Outstanding Unit Award

Commanders
- Current commander: Lt Col Paul Fulkerson

Insignia
- 560th Flying Training Squadron emblem (Note: Modified 13 April 1995.)

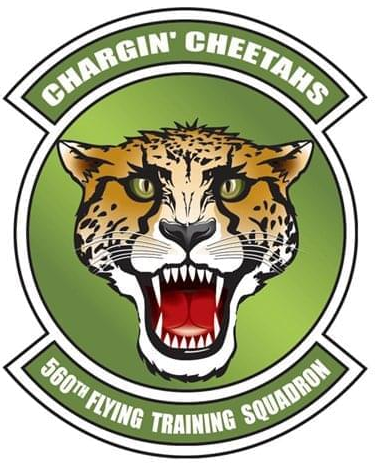
- 560 Flying Training Sq emblem (Note: Approved 10 April 1978.)

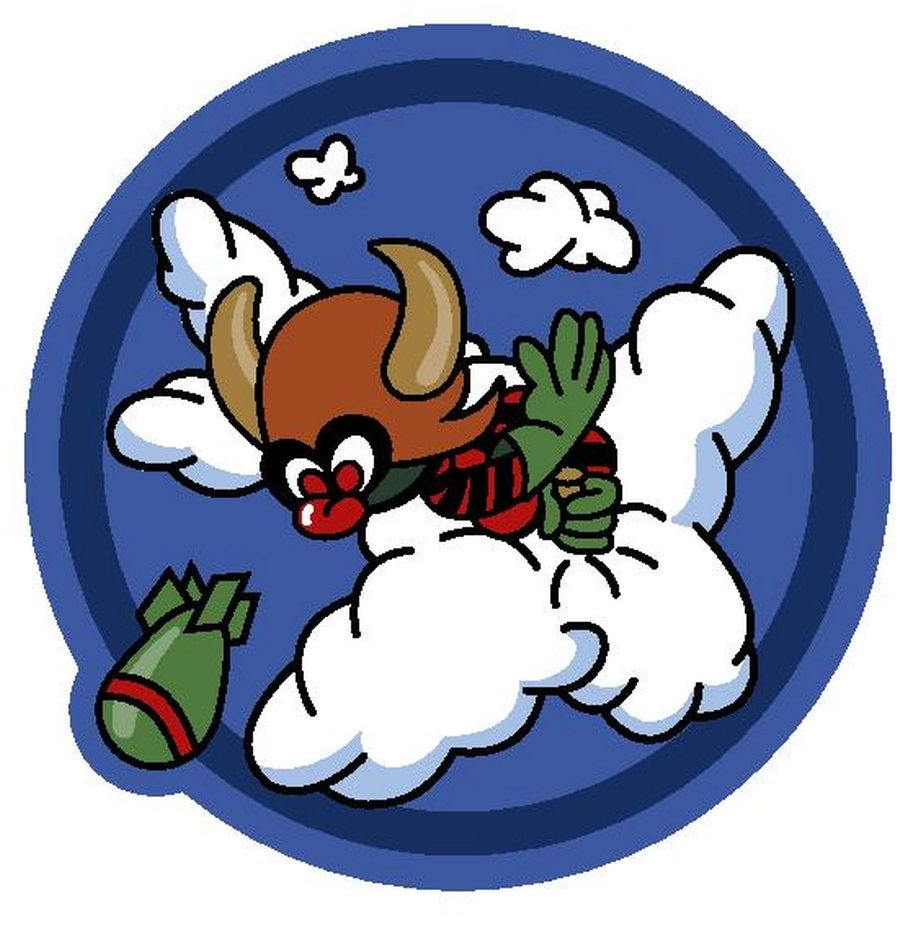
- 560th Bombardment Squadron emblem

The 560th Flying Training Squadron is part of the 12th Flying Training Wing of the United States Air Force based at Randolph Air Force Base, Texas. It operates the Northrop T-38 Talon.

The squadron was first activated during World War II as the 560th Bombardment Squadron. After training with Boeing B-17 Flying Fortress aircraft in the United States, the unit moved to the European Theater of Operations, where it participated in the strategic bombing campaign against Germany. The squadron was awarded the Distinguished Unit Citation on two occasions for its performance in combat. After V-E Day, the squadron returned to the United States and was inactivated.

The squadron served in the reserve from 1947 to 1949, but apparently was only partially staffed and equipped. It was redesignated the 560th Tactical Fighter Squadron and activated in 1962. It served in the United States until 1970, training pilots for deployment to Southeast Asia, while maintaining readiness for combat operations. It deployed to Korea during the Pueblo Crisis of 1968. The squadron was again activated in its current role as a flying training unit in 1972.

== Mission ==
The 560th qualifies fighter and bomber pilots as instructor pilots in the Northrop T-38C Talon. The squadron trains Air Force instructor pilots, Air Force and U.S. Navy test pilot school candidates, allied nation fighter and instructor pilots, and Air Force pilots identified for transition to fighter aircraft. The squadron currently flies a total of 8,800 hours annually in a fleet of nearly 40 aircraft and produces about 130 graduates per year.

== History ==
=== World War II ===
==== Initial training and deployment ====
The 560th was first activated as the 560th Bombardment Squadron at Gowen Field, Idaho, one of the four original squadrons of the 388th Bombardment Group, in December 1942. The cadre that formed at Gowen moved to Wendover Field, Utah in February 1943, where the unit was fully staffed and squadron training with Boeing B-17 Flying Fortress heavy bombers began. Training continued until June 1943, when it deployed to England. The air echelon ferried its B-17s to England via the northern ferry route, while the ground echelon departed for Camp Kilmer, New Jersey, the port of embarkation, sailing in the RMS Queen Elizabeth on 1 July.

==== Combat in Europe ====
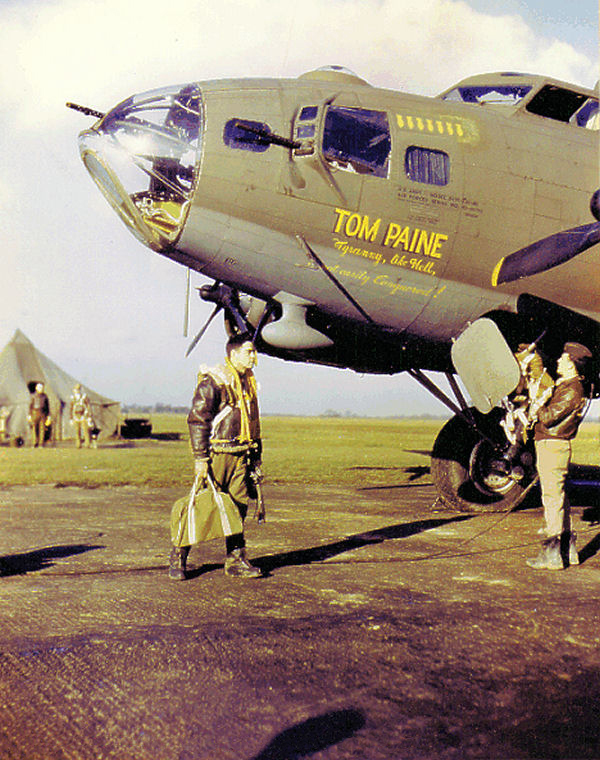
388th Group B-17 in England (Note: Aircraft is Boeing B-17F-120-BO Flying Fortress, serial 42-30793, Tom Paine. It flew its last combat mission on 29 December 1944. Baugher, Joe (10 April 2023). "1942 USAF Serial Numbers". Joe Baugher.)

The squadron assembled at RAF Knettishall, its combat station and flew its first combat mission on 17 July, when it attacked an aircraft factory in Amsterdam. The squadron primarily engaged in the strategic bombing campaign against Germany, attacking industrial sites, oil refineries and storage facilities, communications centers and naval targets on the European Continent.

The squadron was awarded a Distinguished Unit Citation (DUC) for attacking an aircraft factory at Regensburg, Germany, on 17 August 1943, withstanding heavy resistance to reach the target. It was awarded a second DUC for three separate missions: an earlier attack on a tire and rubber factory in Hanover, Germany on 26 July 1943 and two missions in 1944, one against synthetic oil refineries near Brüx, Germany (Note: Now Most, Czech Republic.) on 12 May and at Ruhland, Germany on 21 June. This last attack was on a shuttle bombing mission from England to Germany to Poltava, USSR, (Note: Now in Ukraine.) to Foggia, Italy, and back to England. Other strategic targets included aircraft factories at Brunswick, Kassel, and Reims; airfields at Paris, Berlin and in Bordeaux; naval installations at Emden, Kiel and La Pallice, chemical works in Ludwigshafen; ball bearing factories at Schweinfurt and rail marshalling yards in Bielefeld, Brussels, and Osnabruck.

The squadron was occasionally diverted from the strategic campaign to perform air support and interdiction missions. It attacked military installations in France in early 1944 to help prepare the way for Operation Overlord, the invasion of Normandy, and on D Day hit coastal defenses, artillery batteries and transportation targets. It attacked troop concentrations and supply depots. In July 1944, it supported Operation Cobra at Saint Lo and the following month attacked targets in Caen. It struck military installations and airfields near Arnhem during Operation Market Garden, the unsuccessful attempt to secure a bridgehead across the Rhine in the Netherlands. It attacked transportation targets to support the final drive through Germany in early 1945.

==== Return and inactivation ====
The squadron flew its last combat mission in April 1945. After V-E Day, the squadron flew missions to the Netherlands to drop food in flooded areas. It then began redeploying to the United States. Its aircraft left Knettishall between 9 June and 5 July 1945. The ground echelon sailed again on the Queen Elizabeth on 5 August. The squadron inactivated at Sioux Falls Army Air Field, South Dakota on 28 August 1945.

=== Reserve operations ===
The squadron was activated in the reserves at Orchard Place Airport, Illinois on 6 March 1947. It was assigned to the 338th Bombardment Group, which had been activated at Orchard Place in July 1947, at the end of September. The squadron trained under the supervision of Air Defense Command (ADC)'s 141st AAF Base Unit (Reserve Training) (later the 2471st Air Force Reserve Flying Training Center), although it does not appear that it was fully staffed or equipped.

In July 1948 Continental Air Command (ConAC) assumed responsibility for managing reserve and Air National Guard units from ADC. The 560th was inactivated when ConAC reorganized its reserve units under the wing base organization system in June 1949. President Truman’s reduced 1949 defense budget also required reductions in the number of units in the Air Force, At O'Hare, the 338th Group and its squadrons were inactivated, and most of its personnel transferred to the 437th Troop Carrier Wing.

=== Fighter operations ===
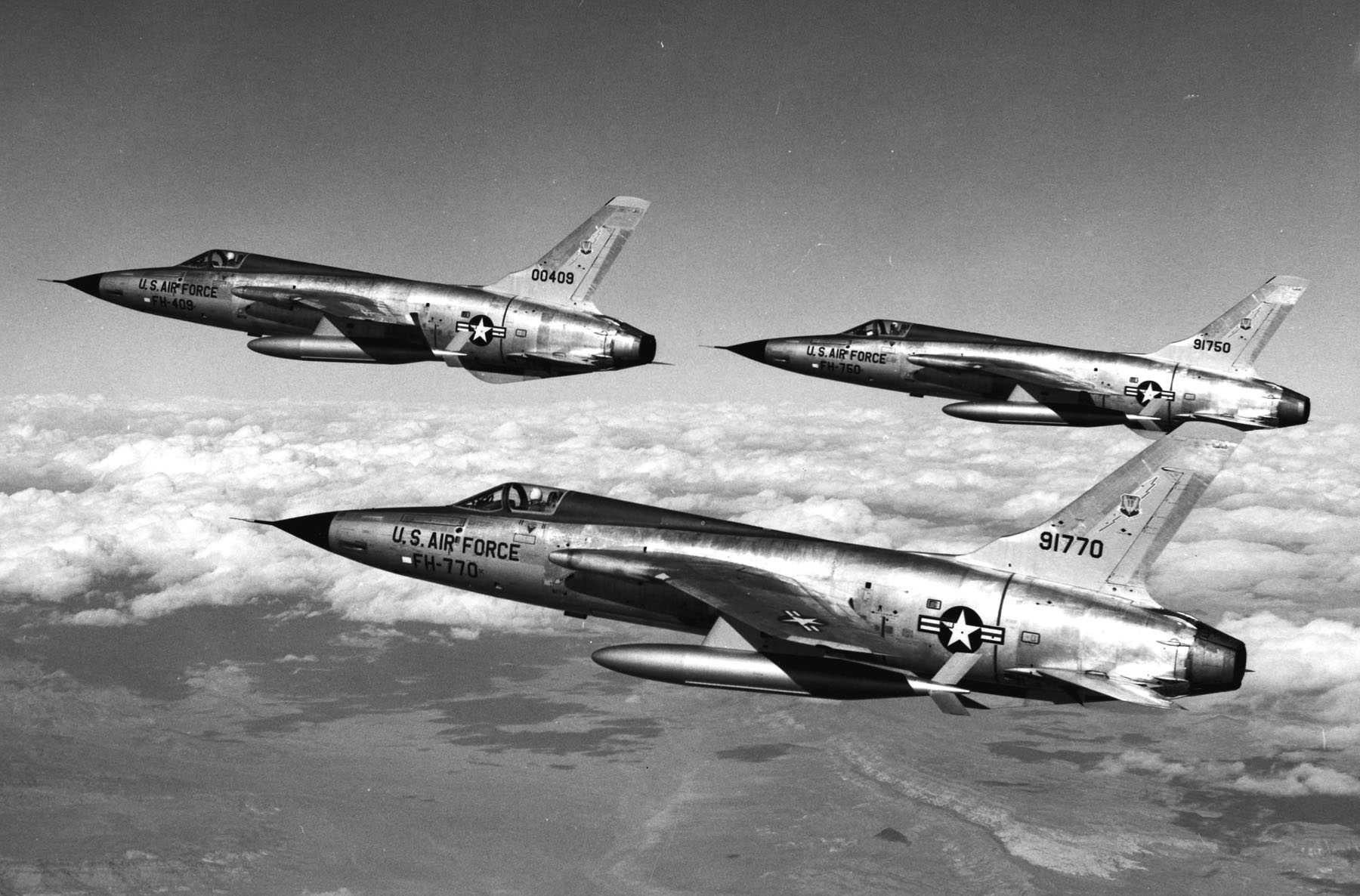
F-105Ds as flown by the squadron

The squadron was organized at McConnell Air Force Base, Kansas in October 1962 and assigned to the 388th Tactical Fighter Wing. In February 1964, the 388th was replaced at McConnell by the 23d Tactical Fighter Wing. It was initially equipped with North American F-100 Super Sabres, but soon converted to the Republic F-105 Thunderchief. The squadron conducted tactical operations and training in preparation for global deployment and after 1966, conducted replacement training in the F-105. In September 1968, it moved to Homestead Air Force Base, Florida, where it converted to the McDonnell F-4 Phantom II. It deployed to South Korea in response to North Korea's capture of the USS Pueblo in June 1969. After maintaining alert status in Korea and later Japan, the squadron returned to Homestead, where it was inactivated in October 1970, and its personnel and equipment were transferred to the 309th Tactical Fighter Squadron.

=== Pilot training ===
On 1 May 1972, the 560th was reactivated as the 560th Flying Training Squadron at Randolph Air Force Base, Texas, and took over the mission of training Northrop T-38 Talon instructor pilots for Air Training Command's Undergraduate Pilot Training bases.

After 1973, all repatriated Vietnam era prisoner of war (POW) pilots physically able to return to active flying duty came to the 560th for requalification training. As the final chapter in Operation Homecoming, the squadron returned more than 150 active duty pilots to flight status. Over the next two years the 560th flew more than 6000 hours and established a lasting bond that it still maintains with these former POWs.

In October 1993, the 560th added the missions of Introduction to Fighter Fundamentals and Upgrade Instructor Pilot Training in the "Smurf Jet" AT-38. In May 1998, the Smurf operation had become squadron-sized and was split off to reactivate the 435th Fighter Training Squadron. The 560th still prepares rated pilots from varied backgrounds for fighter lead-in training.

== Lineage ==
- Constituted as the 560th Bombardment Squadron (Heavy) on 19 December 1942

Activated on 24 December 1942
Redesignated 560th Bombardment Squadron, Heavy on 20 August 1943
Inactivated on 28 Aug 1945

- Redesignated 560th Bombardment Squadron, Very Heavy on 6 February 1947

Activated in the reserve on 6 March 1947
Inactivated on 27 June 1949

- Redesignated 560th Tactical Fighter Squadron and activated on 1 May 1962 (not organized)

Organized on 1 October 1962
Inactivated on 31 October 1970

- Redesignated 560th Flying Training Squadron on 22 March 1972

Activated on 1 May 1972

=== Assignments ===
- 388th Bombardment Group, 24 December 1942 – 28 August 1945
- Second Air Force, 6 March 1947
- 338th Bombardment Group, 30 September 1947 – 27 June 1949
- Tactical Air Command, 1 May 1962 (not organized)
- 388th Tactical Fighter Wing, 1 October 1962
- 23d Tactical Fighter Wing, 8 February 1964
- 4531st Tactical Fighter Wing, 25 September 1968 (attached to 354th Tactical Fighter Wing, 29 June–15 December 1969)
- 31st Tactical Fighter Wing, 15–31 October 1970
- 12th Flying Training Wing, 1 May 1972
- 12th Operations Group, 15 Dec 1991 – present

=== Stations ===
- Gowen Field, Idaho, 24 December 1942
- Wendover Field, Utah, c. 1 February 1943
- Sioux City Army Air Base, Iowa, c. 1 May–8 June 1943
- RAF Knettishall (Station 136), England, c. 6 June 1943 [sic] (Note: This should probably be c. 6 July 1943. Freeman gives 7 July as the date the ground echelon arrived in the United Kingdom. Freeman, p. 255. Maurer only says the squadron arrived in June, without a specific day. Maurer, Combat Squadrons, p. 660.) – c. 6 August 1945
- Sioux Falls Army Air Field, South Dakota, c. 13–28 August 1945
- Orchard Place Airport, Illinois, 6 March 1947 – 27 June 1949
- McConnell Air Force Base, Kansas, 1 October 1962
- Homestead Air Force Base, Florida, 25 September 1968 – 31 October 1970 (deployed to Kunsan Air Base, South Korea, 29 June–15 December 1969)
- Randolph Air Force Base, Texas, 1 May 1972 – present

=== Aircraft operated ===
- Boeing B-17 Flying Fortress (1943–1945)
- North American F-100 Super Sabre (1962–1964)
- Republic F-105 Thunderchief (1963–1968)
- McDonnell F-4 Phantom II (1969–1970)
- Northrop T-38 Talon (1972–present)

=== Awards and campaigns ===
Award streamer	Award	Dates	Notes
	Distinguished Unit Citation	17 August 1943	Germany, 560th Bombardment Squadron
	Distinguished Unit Citation	26 July 1943, 12 May 1944, 21 June 1944	Hannover, Brux, England to Soviet Union, 560th Bombardment Squadron
	Air Force Outstanding Unit Award	25 Sep 1968-30 Jun 1970	560th Tactical Fighter Squadron
	Air Force Outstanding Unit Award	1 May 1972-28 February 1973	560th Flying Training Squadron
	Air Force Outstanding Unit Award	1 January 1986-31 December 1987	560th Flying Training Squadron
	Air Force Outstanding Unit Award	1 January 1988-31 December 1988	560th Flying Training Squadron
	Air Force Outstanding Unit Award	1 January 1990-31 December 1991	560th Flying Training Squadron
	Air Force Outstanding Unit Award	1 January 1992-30 June 1993	560th Flying Training Squadron
	Air Force Outstanding Unit Award	1 July 1993-30 June 1994	560th Flying Training Squadron
	Air Force Outstanding Unit Award	1 July 1995-30 June 1996	560th Flying Training Squadron
	Air Force Outstanding Unit Award	1 July 1996-30 June 1998	560th Flying Training Squadron
	Air Force Outstanding Unit Award	1 July 1998-30 June 2000	560th Flying Training Squadron
	Air Force Outstanding Unit Award	1 July 2002-30 June 2004	560th Flying Training Squadron

Campaign Streamer	Campaign	Dates	Notes
	Air Offensive, Europe	July 1943–5 June 1944	560th Bombardment Squadron
	Air Combat, EAME Theater	July 1943–11 May 1945	560th Bombardment Squadron
	Normandy	6 June 1944 – 24 July 1944	560th Bombardment Squadron
	Northern France	25 July 1944 – 14 September 1944	560th Bombardment Squadron
	Rhineland	15 September 1944 – 21 March 1945	560th Bombardment Squadron
	Ardennes-Alsace	16 December 1944 – 25 January 1945	560th Bombardment Squadron
	Central Europe	22 March 1944 – 21 May 1945	560th Bombardment Squadron

== See also ==
- B-17 Flying Fortress units of the United States Army Air Forces
- List of F-100 units of the United States Air Force
- List of F-105 units of the United States Air Force
- List of F-4 Phantom II operators
