= RAF Fersfield =

Royal Air Force station, 1944-1945

RAF Fersfield (RAF Winfarthing) USAAF Station 140,554
- Located Near Diss, Norfolk, England
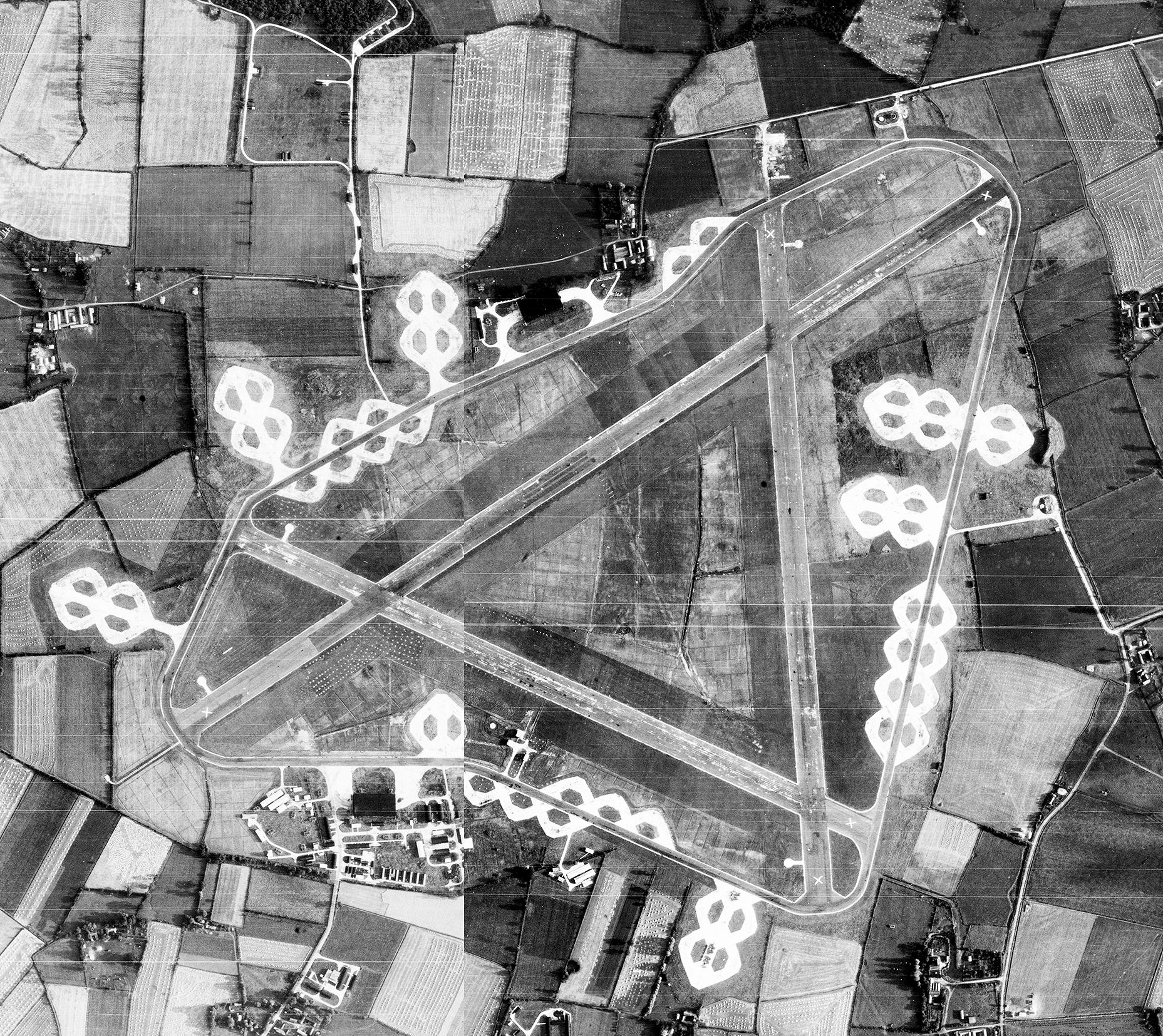
- Aerial mosaic photograph of RAF Fersfield. The bomb dump is located to the north, and the T2 hangar is to the south. 29 August 1946.

Site information
- Type: Military airfield
- Code: WF
- Owner: Air Ministry
- Controlled by: Royal Air Force; United States Army Air Forces

Location
- Map showing the location of RAF Fersfield within Norfolk
- Location within Norfolk
- Coordinates: 52°25′28.68″N 001°03′27.02″E

Site history
- Built: 1943
- In use: 1944–1945
- Battles/wars: European Theatre of World War II "Air Offensive, Europe" July 1942 – May 1945

Garrison information
- Garrison: 562d Bomb Squadron, 388th Bomb Group
- Occupants: USAAF, United States Navy Special Attack Unit (SAU-1)

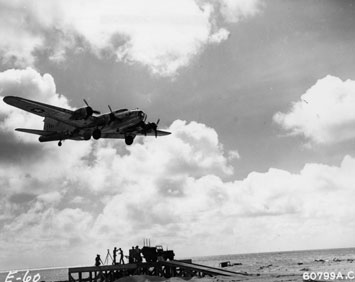
Radio-controlled B-17 Flying Fortress, being test-flown as part of Operation Aphrodite

Royal Air Force Fersfield or more simply RAF Fersfield (originally known as RAF Winfarthing) is a former Royal Air Force station located 16 miles (26 km) southwest of Norwich, Norfolk, England.

== History ==
Built in 1943/1944, the airfield was originally a satellite of RAF Knettishall. It was constructed to Class A bomber specifications, with a main 6,000 ft (1,800 m) runway (08/26), and two secondary runways (02/20, 14/32) of 4,200 ft (1,300 m). Accommodation for about 2,000 personnel was in Nissen huts, along with an operations block and two T-2 hangars.

The facility was originally named Winfarthing when it was allocated to the United States Army Air Forces in 1942. Assigned to the VIII Bomber Command, it was renamed Fersfield when used by the Americans. Winfarthing was assigned USAAF station number 140; Fersfield was reassigned 554. Not used by the USAAF, it was transferred to the United States Navy for operational use.

=== Operation Aphrodite ===
The airfield is most notable as the base for Operation Aphrodite, a secret plan for remote-controlled Boeing B-17 Flying Fortress bombers (redesignated as BQ-7s) to be used against German V-1 flying bomb sites, submarine pens, or deep fortifications that had resisted conventional bombing.

From July 1944 to January 1945, approximately 25 high-time Fortresses (mainly B-17Fs) were assigned to the 562nd Bomb Squadron, 388th Bomb Group stationed at RAF Knettishall, along with two Consolidated B-24 Liberators from the United States Navy (PB4Y-1), to be used in Aphrodite missions. Originally RAF Woodbridge was going to be used, however Fersfield was chosen for to its relative remoteness. The plan was to use these stripped-down war-weary bombers as explosive packed, radio-controlled flying bombs. Pilots would take off manually and then parachute to safety, leaving the bomber under the control of another aircraft to be flown to its target in Europe.

The first mission took place on 4 August 1944 against a V-1 site in Pas-de-Calais. In the first phase of the mission, two motherships and two drones took off. One of the drones went out of control shortly after the first crewman had bailed out. It crashed near the coastal village of Orford, destroying 2 acres (8,100 m^{2}) of trees and leaving an enormous crater. The body of the other crewman was never found. The second drone was successfully dispatched toward the Pas-de-Calais. However, clouds obscured the television view from the nose just as the drone approached the target site, and the plane missed the target by 500 ft (150 m). The second phase of the mission fared little better. One robot BQ-7 had a control malfunction before it could dive onto its target and was shot down by German flak; the other missed its target by 500 yd (460 m).

Several subsequent missions were attempted, one of them being a United States Navy PB4Y-1 which exploded over the village of Blythburgh, Suffolk, killing LT Joseph P. Kennedy Jr., who had presidential ambitions and was the brother of future President John F. Kennedy.

The last Aphrodite mission was on 20 January 1945, against a power station at Oldenburg: both drones missed their targets by several miles. After this last effort, the Aphrodite concept was abandoned as being unfeasible.

=== Royal Air Force use ===
One of the RAF's most secret operations, Operation Carthage, was launched from Fersfield on 21 March 1945. The target was the Gestapo HQ in Copenhagen, and de Havilland Mosquitos from No 21 Sqn, No 464 Sqn RAAF and No 487 Sqn RNZAF made the trip across the North Sea and back. The raid was led by Group Captain R.N. Bateson, and was ranked as a success in spite of many civilian casualties, mostly children.

== Postwar use ==
=== Motorsport ===
Fersfield
- Location: Norfolk, England
- Opened: 1950
- Closed: 1951
- Length: 2 mi (3.2 km)

The Eastern Counties Motor Club (ECMC) was formed early in 1950 and was soon turning its attention to organising competitive motoring, the first being a speed trail at RAF Bentwaters on 23 April. One year later, on 22 April 1951, the club’s first race meeting took place at Fersfield, which is situated near Diss in Norfolk. That the first was a ‘closed-to-club’ affair, but just two months later an invitation meeting (to which seven clubs were invited) was organised for 17 June, at which nine races were run, with an estimated crowd of 8,000, was a great success. Cars taking part included pre-war racers such as Bentleys, Frazer-Nash, MG and Bugattis plus Jaguars, Connaughts, Healeys and even a Ferrari. The RAC steward requested the fourth race be red-flagged (stopped) as spectators had encroached into a restricted area; but some drivers declined to obey the flag and were reprimanded for their colour blindness!

Further race meetings were held in 1952 but at the end of the season, the RAC requested that certain improvements be carried out which would have cost £10,000. This being beyond the club’s resources, Fersfield was abandoned. However, the ECMC was not to be outdone and turned its attention to another Norfolk airfield, Snetterton Heath (which become Snetterton) where it successfully ran the Eastern Counties 100 meeting for many years.

According to folklore, the RAC steward once insisted that everyone present at Fersfield should sweep the track clean of rubbish before he would allow racing to continue. As with most circuits there was always a lighter side and Fersfield was no exception, for the story goes of the road sweeper which did two laps to clean the track without the brushes working.

== Current use ==
Today, much of the concreted areas of the airfield have been removed for hardcore, with the airfield area being returned to agricultural uses. A surprising number of buildings exist, some on the former airfield, which are being used by agriculture, along with one of T-2 hangars. Others are in the wooded areas south of the former airfield in various states of decay. The perimeter track and runways still exist, although greatly reduced in width, being used as agricultural farm roads. Other roads in the area, identified by "Airfield Road" signs, are the last vestiges of the former airfield.

== See also ==
- List of former Royal Air Force stations
