= 563rd Electronic Warfare Squadron =

563rd Electronic Warfare Squadron

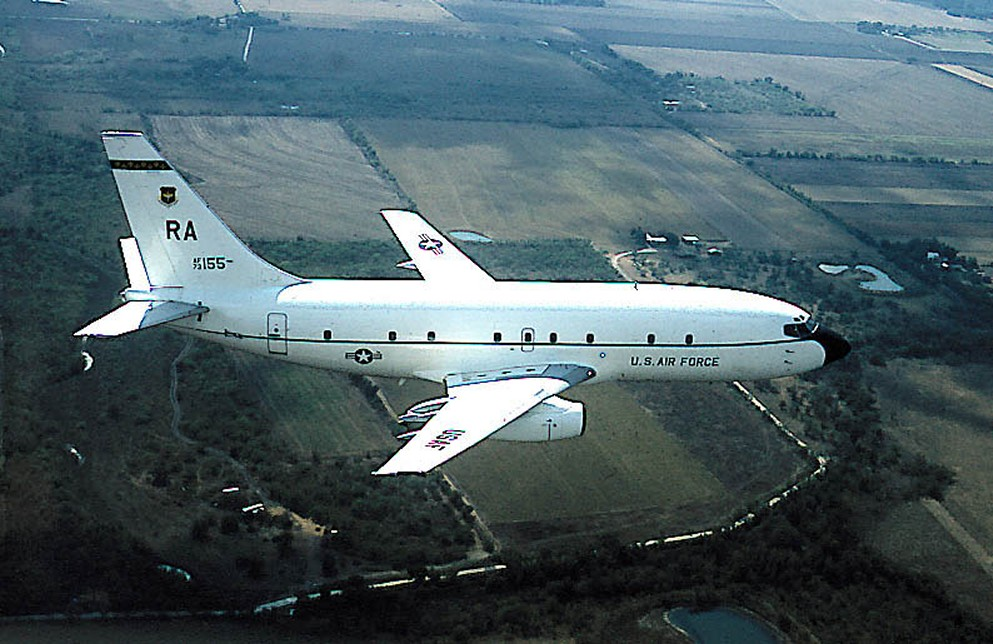
- A T-43 Bobcat from Randolph AFB, the last assigned aircraft of the unit
- Active: 1942–1945; 1947–1949; 1953–1957; 1962–1972; 1975–1989; 1993–1996; 1999–2010; 2024-
- Country: United States
- Branch: United States Air Force
- Role: Spectrum Warfare
- Part of: Air Combat Command
- Engagements: European Theater of Operations; Vietnam War
- Decorations: Distinguished Unit Citation; Air Force Outstanding Unit Award with Combat "V" Device; Air Force Outstanding Unit Award

Insignia
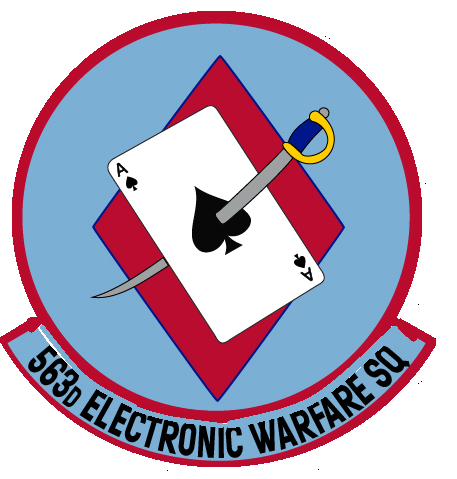
- 563rd Electronic Warfare Squadron emblem

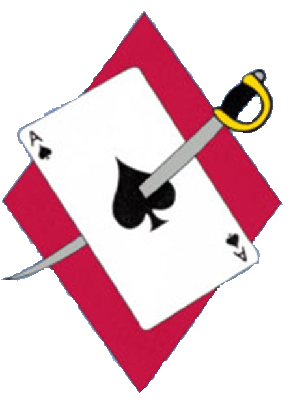
- 563rd Fighter-Bomber Squadron emblem (Note: Approved 4 February 1955. Description: Over a red diamond, the black ace of spades playing card, a sabre piercing through the center of the card, blade silver, hilt and pommel gold and black.)

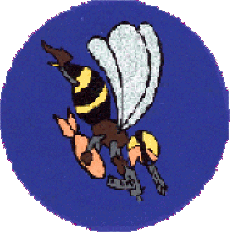
- 563rd Bombardment Squadron emblem (Note: Approved 7 July 1944.)

The 563rd Electronic Warfare Squadron is an active United States Air Force unit. It was activated and redesignated for electronic warfare in April 2024. It is part of the 850th Spectrum Warfare Group of the 350th Spectrum Warfare Wing.

The squadron was originally activated during World War II as the 563d Bombardment Squadron. After training in the United States, it deployed to the European Theater of Operations, where it participated in the strategic bombing campaign against Germany. The squadron was twice awarded the Distinguished Unit Citation for its combat actions. Following V-E Day, it returned to the United States and was inactivated. The squadron was briefly active in the Air Force Reserve in the late 1940s, but does not appear to have been fully manned or equipped.

The squadron was redesignated the 563d Fighter-Bomber Squadron and activated in 1953. It moved to Europe, but was inactivated in 1957, when it was replaced by another unit. It was activated again as the 563d Tactical Fighter Squadron in 1962. It conducted frequent deployments, but focused on training pilots for operations in Southeast Asia. Elements of the squadron participated in combat there, although the squadron remained in the United States. From 1973, it conducted Wild Weasel training. It deployed elements for Desert Storm before inactivating in 1992. It was reactivated in 1992 and was part of the 12th Flying Training Wing at Randolph Air Force Base, Texas, where it operated the Boeing T-43 Bobcat conducting navigator training until inactivating on 19 November 2010.

== Mission ==
The squadron researches, builds, ships, tests, and maintains software applications to support mission essential functions. These functions include rapid electronic warfare integrated reprogramming, electromagnetic spectrum operations assessment, and target and waveform capability development. Its Detachment 1 serves as a software development training arm to enable others by prioritizing a data-first, test driven approach to secure electromagnetic spectrum operations superiority.

== History ==
=== World War II ===
==== Initial training and deployment ====
The 563d was first activated as the 563d Bombardment Squadron at Gowen Field, Idaho, one of the four original squadrons of the 388th Bombardment Group, in December 1942. The cadre that formed at Gowen moved to Wendover Field, Utah in February 1943, where the unit was fully manned and squadron training with Boeing B-17 Flying Fortress heavy bombers began. Training continued until June 1943, when it deployed to England. The air echelon ferried its B-17s to England via the northern ferry route, while the ground echelon departed for Camp Kilmer, New Jersey, the port of embarkation, sailing in the RMS Queen Elizabeth on 1 July.

==== Combat in Europe ====
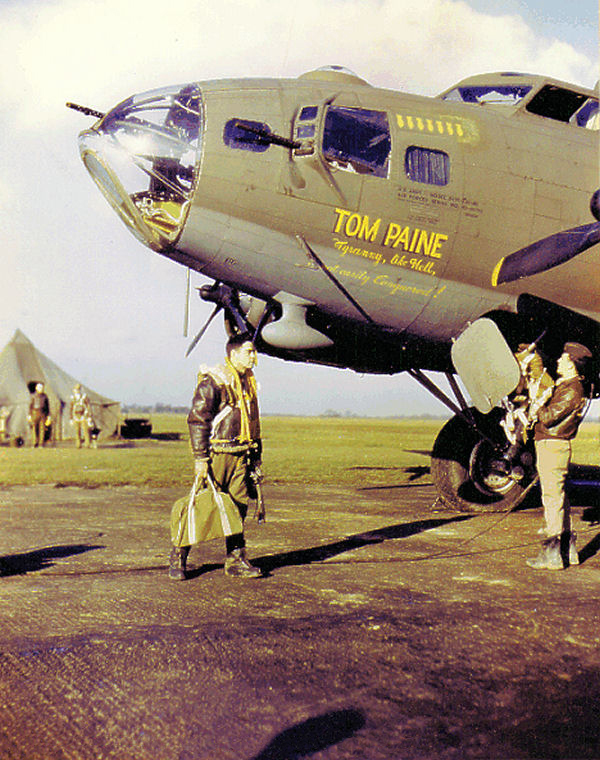
388th Group B-17 in England (Note: Aircraft is Boeing B-17F-120-BO Flying Fortress, serial 42-30793, Tom Paine.)

The squadron assembled at RAF Knettishall, its combat station, and flew its first combat mission on 17 July, when it attacked an aircraft factory in Amsterdam. The squadron primarily engaged in the strategic bombing campaign against Germany, attacking industrial sites, oil refineries and storage facilities, communications centers and naval targets on the European Continent.

The squadron was awarded a Distinguished Unit Citation (DUC) for attacking an aircraft factory at Regensburg, Germany, on 17 August 1943, withstanding heavy resistance to reach the target. It was awarded a second DUC for three separate missions: an earlier attack on a tire and rubber factory in Hanover, Germany on 26 July 1943 and two missions in 1944, one against synthetic oil refineries near Brüx, Germany (Note: Now Most, Czech Republic.) on 12 May and at Ruhland, Germany on 21 June. This last attack was on a shuttle bombing mission from England to Germany to Poltava, USSR, (Note: Now in Ukraine.) to Foggia, Italy, and back to England. Other strategic targets included aircraft factories at Brunswick, Kassel, and Reims; airfields at Paris, Berlin and in Bordeaux; naval installations at Emden, Kiel and La Pallice, chemical works in Ludwigshafen; ball bearing factories at Schweinfurt and rail marshalling yards in Bielefeld, Brussels, and Osnabruck.

The squadron was occasionally diverted from the strategic campaign to perform air support and air interdiction missions. It attacked military installations in France in early 1944 to help prepare the way for Operation Overlord, the invasion of Normandy, and on D Day hit coastal defenses, artillery batteries and transportation targets. It attacked troop concentrations and supply depots. In July 1944, it supported Operation Cobra at Saint Lo and the following month attacked targets in Caen. It struck military installations and airfields near Arnhem during Operation Market Garden, the unsuccessful attempt to secure a bridgehead across the Rhine in the Netherlands. It attacked transportation targets to support the final drive through Germany in early 1945.

==== Return and inactivation ====
The squadron flew its last combat mission in April 1945. After V-E Day, the squadron flew missions to the Netherlands to drop food in flooded areas. It then began redeploying to the United States. Its aircraft left Knettishall between 9 June and 5 July 1945. The ground echelon sailed again on the Queen Elizabeth on 5 August. The squadron inactivated at Sioux Falls Army Air Field, South Dakota on 28 August 1945.

=== Air Force reserve ===
The squadron was activated in the reserves at Orchard Place Airport, Illinois on 12 June 1947 and assigned to the 338th Bombardment Group. The squadron trained under the supervision of Air Defense Command (ADC)'s 141st AAF Base Unit (Reserve Training) (later the 2471st Air Force Reserve Flying Training Center), although it does not appear that it was fully manned or equipped. Although nominally a bombardment unit, the squadron was equipped with North American AT-6 Texan and Beechcraft AT-11 Kansan trainers.

In July 1948 Continental Air Command (ConAC) assumed responsibility for managing reserve and Air National Guard units from ADC. In 1949, the 563nd began to fly a few Curtiss C-46 Commando and Douglas C-47 Skytrain troop carriers and Douglas B-26 Invader light bombers, but it was inactivated in June when ConAC reorganized its reserve units under the wing base organization system. President Truman's reduced 1949 defense budget also required reductions in the number of units in the Air Force, At O'Hare, the 338th Group and its squadrons were inactivated, and most of its personnel transferred to the 437th Troop Carrier Wing.

=== Fighter operations in Europe ===
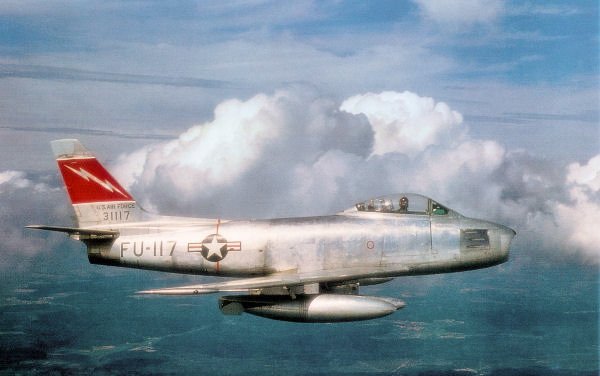
563rd F-86F Sabre (Note: Aircraft is North American F-86F-35-NA Sabre, serial 53-1117. In 1957 this aircraft was transferred to the Norwegian Air Force.)

The squadron was redesignated the 563d Fighter-Bomber Squadron and activated at Clovis Air Force Base, New Mexico in November 1953. The squadron was equipped with North American F-86F Sabres, with a capability of carrying nuclear weapons. A year after activation, in November 1954, the squadron was transferred to United States Air Forces Europe and departed, along with other elements of the 388th Fighter-Bomber Wing, for Étain-Rouvres Air Base, France. However, construction at Etain was not far enough advanced to permit it to accept fighter aircraft, and only the wing headquarters settled in to the base. Instead, the squadron ferried their Sabres to Bitburg Air Base, Germany, arriving the following month.

Little flying was done in the squadron's first winter in Europe due to weather. It deployed to Wheelus Air Base, Libya in April 1955, where it was able to train in gunnery and bombing for the first time since arriving in Europe. The squadron rejoined the wing at its permanent base in France in July 1955, the first of the wing's squadrons to arrive. Starting in November 1955, it began deployments to Detachment 1 of the 388th Wing at Hahn Air Base, Germany to stand nuclear alert. The detachment moved to Spangdahlem Air Base, Germany in February 1956.

The unit flew support for the Suez Canal and Hungarian crises. In August 1956, the squadron began training to convert to the North American F-100 Super Sabre. The conversion was completed by 2 April 1957. However, the squadron flew the "Hun" for less than a year. On 10 December 1957, the 49th Fighter-Bomber Wing moved from Japan on paper to replace the 388th Wing, The 563d was inactivated and its mission, personnel and aircraft transferred to the 9th Fighter-Bomber Squadron.

=== F-105 fighter operations ===
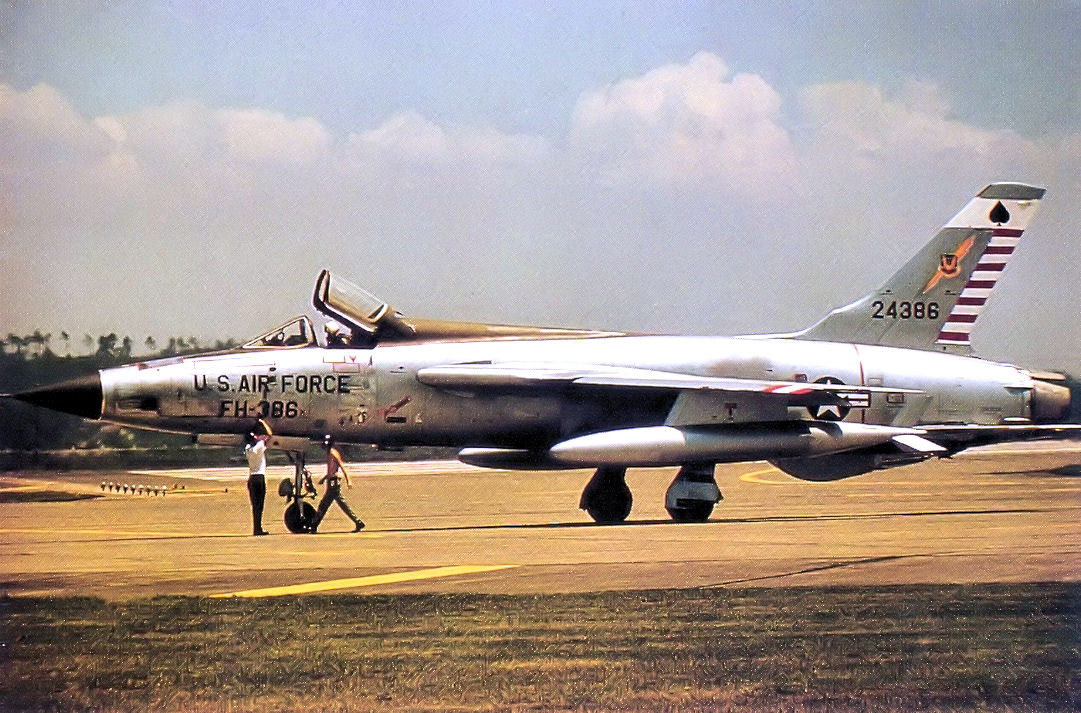
563rd TFS F-105 Thunderchief at Yokota AB (Note: Aircraft is Republic F-105D-31-RE Thunderchief, serial 62-4386 in 1965.)

The squadron was redesignated the 563d Tactical Fighter Squadron, organized at McConnell Air Force Base, Kansas in October 1962 and assigned to the 388th Tactical Fighter Wing. The 563d was equipped with the Republic F-105 Thunderchief, although it initially flew F-100s as well until becoming an all Thunderchief unit. In February 1964, the 388th was replaced at McConnell by the 23d Tactical Fighter Wing. The squadron conducted tactical operations and training in preparation for global deployment. In April 1965, the 563d deployed to Takhli Royal Thai Air Force Base, Thailand, where it participated in combat operations in the Vietnam War under the control of the 6235th Tactical Fighter Wing (Note: This was actually two different organizations. As the squadron arrived at Takhli, Pacific Air Forces formed the Tactical Fighter Wing, 6235th, Provisional. The provisional wing was replaced by a MAJCON wing with the same number on 8 July 1965, to which the squadron was attached until August, when it was relieved by the 562d Tactical Fighter Squadron.) On 27 July 1965, the unit participated in the first destruction of a surface-to-air missile site in North Vietnam in Operation Iron Hand. It participated in the first increment of Operation Rolling Thunder, and in several attempts to destroy the Thanh Hoa and Paul Doumer Bridges.

The squadron returned to McConnell after earning two Air Force Outstanding Unit Awards with Combat "V" Device during its combat tour in Thailand. It had flown more than 1500 sorties over North Vietnam and Laos and lost ten of the F-105Ds it originally deployed with. Two squadron pilots were killed in action and three became Prisoners of War. In 1966, the squadron focused on training replacement F-105 pilots for units in Southeast Asia. It continued this mission until August 1970, when the need for "Thud Drivers" diminished with the withdrawal of the United States from Southeast Asia. The squadron continued to fly the F-105 until inactivated in July 1972.

=== Wild Weasel ===
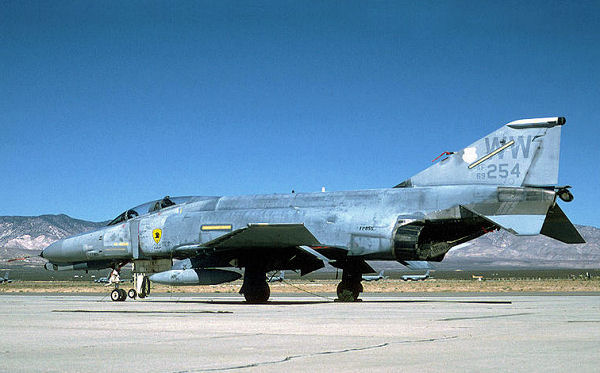
563rd TFS F-4E Phantom II (Note: Aircraft is McDonnell Douglas F-4E-43-MC Phantom, serial 69-7254 in F-4G Wild Weasel configuration. It awaits its turn at Mojave for conversion to a 'Red Tail' target drone. The white fin cap indicates the aircraft was assigned to the 563rd TFS. Converted to QF-4G and expended 4 June 2002.)

On 31 July 1975, the 563rd was again activated at George Air Force Base, California as the 563d Tactical Fighter Training Squadron and assigned to the 35th Tactical Fighter Wing. It initially flew Thunderstick II aircraft but replaced them with McDonnell F-4 Phantom IIs in September 1975. In October 1978, the 563rd received new aircraft from Nellis Air Force Base, Nevada, and was the first operational squadron to fly the advanced F-4G Wild Weasel. The unit served with this electronic warfare aircraft in many exercises until it was inactivated in October 1989.

=== Flying training ===
On 14 May 1993, the 563rd was redesigned the 563d Flying Training Squadron and activated at Randolph Air Force Base, Texas. The squadron was assigned to the 12th Flying Training Wing under Air Education and Training Command. In conjunction with the 562nd Flying Training Squadron, it operated the Boeing T-43 Bobcat aircraft conducting electronic warfare officer and combat systems officer training in electronic attack, threat reaction, and electronic surveillance. The 563rd also operated the T-25 Simulator. In 1996, its mission transferred to Pensacola Naval Air Station and Corry Station, Florida as the Air Force and the Navy combined their training activities and the squadron was inactivated in June 1996. The Air Force resumed training electronic warfare officers in 1999 and the squadron was reactivated in April. This training moved again to Pensacola and became the responsibility of the 479th Flying Training Group and the squadron was inactivated in November 2010.

=== Electronic warfare ===
The squadron was redesignated 563rd Electronic Warfare Squadron and activated at Joint Base San Antonio in April 2024.

== Lineage ==
- Constituted as the 563rd Bombardment Squadron (Heavy) on 19 December 1942

Activated on 24 December 1942
Redesignated 563rd Bombardment Squadron, Heavy on 20 August 1943
Inactivated on 28 August 1945

- Redesignated 563rd Bombardment Squadron, Very Heavy on 5 May 1947

Activated in the reserve on 12 June 1947
Inactivated on 27 June 1949

- Redesignated 563rd Fighter-Bomber Squadron on 5 November 1953

Activated on 23 November 1953
Inactivated on 10 December 1957

- Redesignated 563rd Tactical Fighter Squadron and activated on 1 May 1962 (not organized)

Organized on 1 October 1962
Inactivated on 31 July 1972

- Redesignated 563rd Tactical Fighter Training Squadron on 15 July 1975

Activated on 31 July 1975
Redesignated 563rd Tactical Fighter Squadron on 1 July 1977
Inactivated on 5 October 1989

- Redesignated 563rd Flying Training Squadron on 14 December 1992

Activated on 14 May 1993
Inactivated on 3 June 1996

- Activated on 30 April 1999

Inactivated on 19 November 2010

- Redesignated/Activated 563rd Electronic Warfare Squadron on 15 March 2024

Activated on 25 April 2024

=== Assignments ===
- 388th Bombardment Group, 24 December 1942 – 28 August 1945
- 338th Bombardment Group, 12 June 1947 – 27 June 1949
- 388th Fighter-Bomber Group, 23 November 1953 – 10 December 1957 (attached to 388th Fighter-Bomber Wing after 1 July 1957)
- Tactical Air Command, 1 May 1962 (not organized)
- 388th Tactical Fighter Wing, 1 October 1962
- 23rd Tactical Fighter Wing, 8 February 1964 (attached to 2nd Air Division, 8–9 April 1965; 6235th Tactical Fighter Wing [Provisional], 10 April-15 August 1965)
- 832nd Air Division, 1–31 July 1972
- 35th Tactical Fighter Wing, 31 July 1975
- 37th Tactical Fighter Wing, 30 March 1981 – 5 October 1989
- 12th Operations Group, 14 May 1993 – 3 June 1996
- 12th Operations Group, 30 April 1999 – 19 November 2010
- 850th Spectrum Warfare Group, 25 April 2024 - present

=== Stations ===
- Gowen Field, Idaho, 24 December 1942
- Wendover Field, Utah, c. 1 February 1943
- Sioux City Army Air Base, Iowa, 1 May-7 June 1943
- RAF Knettishall (AAF-136), England, June 1943 – c. 6 August 1945
- Sioux Falls Army Air Field, South Dakota, c. 13–28 August 1945
- Orchard Place Airport, Illinois, 12 June 1947 – 27 June 1949
- Clovis Air Force Base, New Mexico, 23 November 1953 – 28 November 1954
- Bitburg Air Base, Germany, 12 December 1954
- Étain-Rouvres Air Base, France, 7 July 1955 – 10 December 1957
- McConnell Air Force Base, Kansas, 1 October 1962 – 31 July 1972 (deployed to Takhli Royal Thai Air Force Base, Thailand 8 April-15 August 1965; Eglin Air Force Base, Florida 22 April-3 June 1971)
- George Air Force Base, California, 31 July 1975 – 5 October 1989.
- Randolph Air Force Base, Texas, 14 May 1993 – 3 June 1996
- Randolph Air Force Base, Texas, 30 April 1999 - 19 November 2010
- Joint Base San Antonio-Lackland 25 April 2024 - present

=== Aircraft ===
- Boeing B-17 Flying Fortress (1943–1945)
- North American AT-6 Texan (1947–1949)
- Beechcraft AT-11 Kansan (1947–1949)
- Curtiss C-46 Commando (1949)
- Douglas C-47 Skytrain (1949)
- Douglas B-26 Marauder (1949)
- North American F-86 Sabre (1954–1956)
- North American F-100 Super Sabre (1957, 1963–1964)
- Republic F-105 Thunderchief (1963–1972)
- McDonnell F-4 Phantom II (1975–1989)
- Boeing T-43 Bobcat (1993–1996, 1999–2010)

=== Awards and campaigns ===
Award streamer	Award	Dates	Notes
	Distinguished Unit Citation	17 August 1943	Germany, 563d Bombardment Squadron
	Distinguished Unit Citation	26 July 1943, 12 May 1944, 21 June 1944	Hannover, Brux, England to Soviet Union, 563d Bombardment Squadron
	Air Force Outstanding Unit Award with Combat "V" Device	8 April 1965–8 June 1965	563d Tactical Fighter Squadron
	Air Force Outstanding Unit Award] with Combat "V" Device	29 June 1965–15 August 1965	563d Tactical Fighter Squadron
	Air Force Outstanding Unit Award	1 June 1970–15 June 1971	563d Tactical Fighter Squadron
	Air Force Outstanding Unit Award	2 February 1976–31 March 1977	563d Tactical Fighter Training Squadron
	Air Force Outstanding Unit Award	1 June 1985–31 May 1987	563d Tactical Fighter Squadron
	Air Force Outstanding Unit Award	14 May 1993–30 June 1993	563d Flying Training Squadron
	Air Force Outstanding Unit Award	1 July 1993–30 June 1994	563d Flying Training Squadron
	Air Force Outstanding Unit Award	1 July 1995–3 June 1996	563d Flying Training Squadron
	Air Force Outstanding Unit Award	1 July 1996–30 June 1998	563d Flying Training Squadron
	Air Force Outstanding Unit Award	30 Apr 1999–30 June 2000 (Note: Musser includes dates for this award when the squadron was not active. Factsheet 563 Flying Training Squadron.)	563d Flying Training Squadron
	Air Force Outstanding Unit Award	1 July 2002–30 June 2004	563d Flying Training Squadron
	Air Force Outstanding Unit Award	1 July 2004–30 June 2006	563d Flying Training Squadron
	Air Force Outstanding Unit Award	1 July 2008–30 June 2009	563d Flying Training Squadron
	Air Force Outstanding Unit Award	1 July 2009–19 November 2010	563d Flying Training Squadron

Campaign Streamer	Campaign	Dates	Notes
	Air Offensive, Europe	July 1943–5 June 1944	563d Bombardment Squadron
	Air Combat, EAME Theater	July 1943–11 May 1945	563d Bombardment Squadron
	Normandy	6 June 1944 – 24 July 1944	563d Bombardment Squadron
	Northern France	25 July 1944 – 14 September 1944	563d Bombardment Squadron
	Rhineland	15 September 1944 – 21 March 1945	563d Bombardment Squadron
	Ardennes-Alsace	16 December 1944 – 25 January 1945	563d Bombardment Squadron
	Central Europe	22 March 1944 – 21 May 1945	563d Bombardment Squadron
	Vietnam Defensive	8 April 1965 – 15 August 1965	563d Tactical Fighter Squadron

== See also ==
- B-17 Flying Fortress units of the United States Army Air Forces
- List of F-86 Sabre units
- List of F-100 units of the United States Air Force
- List of F-105 units of the United States Air Force
- List of F-4 Phantom II operators
