= 350th Spectrum Warfare Wing =

US Air Force unit

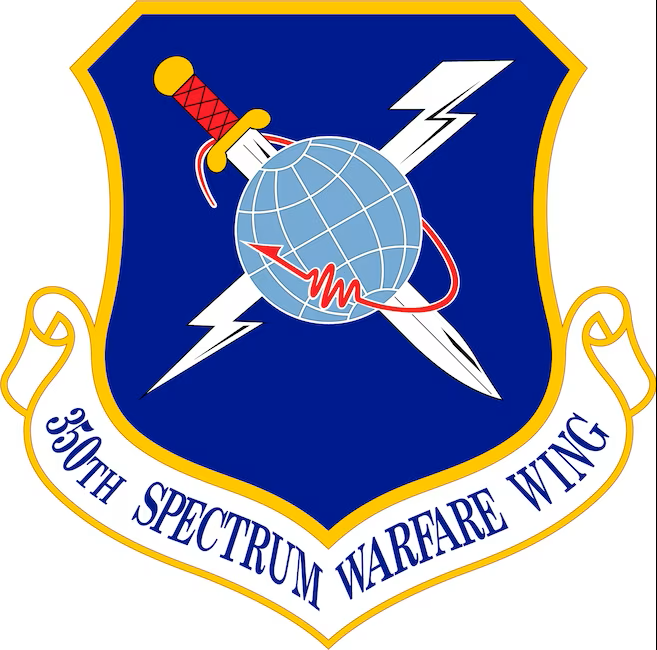
- Active: 25 June 2021 - present
- Country: United States
- Branch: United States Air Force
- Role: Electronic Warfare
- Garrison/HQ: Eglin Air Force Base, Florida

The 350th Spectrum Warfare Wing is an active United States Air Force organization. It was activated in 2021 at Eglin Air Force Base, Florida. The wing is responsible for delivering electromagnetic spectrum capabilities to 70 United States and foreign electromagnetic warfare systems. Additionally, the wing is responsible for electromagnetic warfare reprogramming, modeling and simulation, and assessments.

== Importance to the F-35 JSF program ==
The F-35 Partner Support Complex is indispensable for the operation of all F-35 aircraft, both those in US military service and those exported to partner nations, except Israel. In order to execute any mission, the F-35 first needs Mission Data Files (MDFs) to be uploaded to its onboard computer (containing such sensitive data as information on the targets, the enemy assets defending the target, the optimal flight trajectory to reach the target safely, the optimal trajectory to return home safely, etc.).

These MDFs may be furnished to the onboard computers of the exported F-35 aircraft only by the F-35 Partner Support Complex, except those exported to Israel.

At the F-35 Partner Support Complex, these MDFs are compiled and then uploaded to exported F-35s' onboard computers by:

- 40 British, 20 Australian, and 35 US personnel for aircraft exported to the UK and Australia;
- 8 Italian, 7 Norwegian and 35 US personnel for aircraft exported to Italy and Norway;
- 40 US personnel for F-35 aircraft exported to all other customer nations, except Israel.

According to aviation journalist Bill Sweetman, the UK requested U.S. authorization to establish its own Reprogramming Lab on UK soil, in 2006 to the Bush Administration and again in 2009 to the Obama Administration, but was refused both times.

== Lineage ==
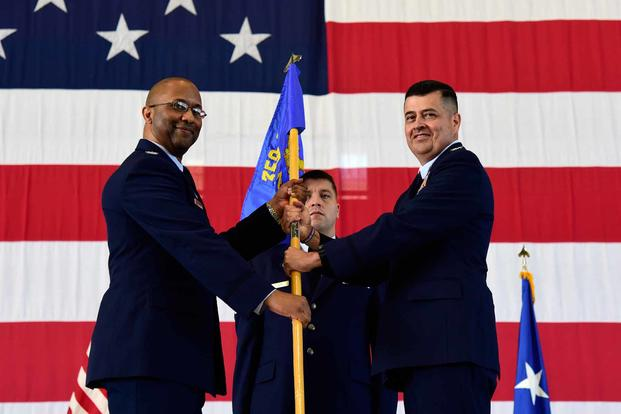
U.S. Air Force Col. John Paul Mintz, accepts command and the guidon of the 850th Spectrum Warfare Group from U.S. Air Force Col. William Young, Jr., 350th Spectrum Warfare Wing commander, during the 350 SWW activation ceremony.

350th Spectrum Warfare Wing

Constituted as 350th Spectrum Warfare Wing on 16 Mar 2021. Activated on 25 Jun 2021.

=== Assignments ===
- United States Air Force Warfare Center, 25 June 2021

=== Components ===
Groups

- 350th Spectrum Warfare Group, 25 June 2021 - present.
  - 16th Electronic Warfare Squadron, 25 June 2021 - present.
  - 23d Electronic Warfare Squadron, 18 April 2025 - present.
  - 36th Electronic Warfare Squadron, 25 June 2021 - present.
  - 68th Electronic Warfare Squadron, 25 June 2021 - present.
  - 513th Electronic Warfare Squadron, 25 June 2021 – present.
  - F-35 Partner Support Complex, 25 June 2021 – present.
- 850th Spectrum Warfare Group, 25 June 2021 - present.
  - 39th Electronic Warfare Squadron, 25 June 2021 - present.
  - 388th Electronic Warfare Squadron, 1 May 2024 – present.
  - 453d Electronic Warfare Squadron, 25 June 2021 – present.
  - 563d Electronic Warfare Squadron, 25 April 2024 - present.
  - 850th Spectrum Warfare Group, Detachment 1, 6 June 2022 - present.
- 950th Spectrum Warfare Group, 1 August 2024 - present.
  - 17th Electronic Warfare Squadron, Robins Air Force Base, Georgia, 1 August 2024 - present.
  - 87th Electronic Warfare Squadron, 25 June 2021 - present.
  - 950th Spectrum Warfare Group Detachment 1, 7 March 2025 - present.
  - 950th Spectrum Warfare Group Detachment 2, 7 March 2025 - present.

=== Stations ===
- Eglin Air Force Base, Florida, c. 25 June 2021 - present

== Bibliography ==
- Maurer, Maurer, ed. (1982) [1969]. Combat Squadrons of the Air Force, World War II (PDF) (reprint ed.). Washington, DC: Office of Air Force History. ISBN 0-405-12194-6. LCCN 70605402. OCLC 72556. Archived from the original (PDF) on 20 December 2016.
