= RAF Knettishall =

Former Royal Air Force station in Suffolk, England

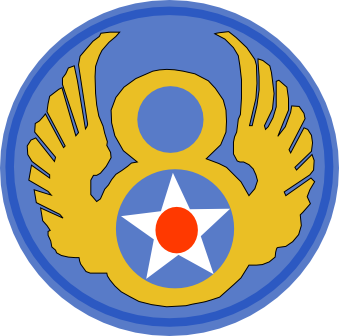
RAF Knettishall
- Knettishall, Suffolk in England
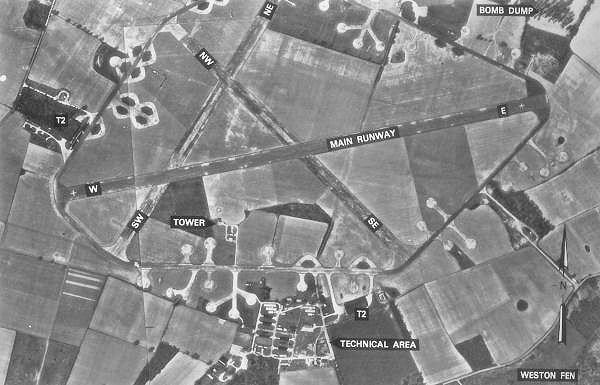
- An aerial photograph of RAF Knettishall in 1951

Site information
- Owner: Air Ministry
- Operator: Royal Air Force; United States Army Air Forces
- Controlled by: Eighth Air Force

Location
- Shown within Suffolk RAF Knettishall (the United Kingdom)
- Coordinates: 52°22′35″N 000°53′22″E

Site history
- Built: 1942/43
- In use: 1943 - 1957
- Battles/wars: European theatre of World War II

Airfield information
Runways
Direction	Length and surface
W/E	6000ft (1828m) - Concrete
NW/SE	4200ft (1280m) - Concrete
SW/NE	4200ft (1280m) - Concrete

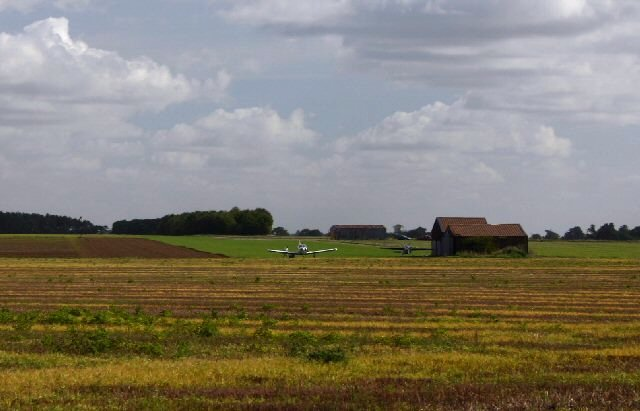
An aircraft operating on what used to be RAF Knettishall

Royal Air Force Knettishall or more simply RAF Knettishall is a former Royal Air Force station in Suffolk, England. During the Second World War, it was numbered as Station 136 by the United States Army Air Forces while home to the 388th Bombardment Group and its four squadrons consisting of:

- 560th Bombardment Squadron
- 561st Bombardment Squadron
- 562nd Bombardment Squadron
- 563rd Bombardment Squadron

Part of the Eighth Air Force between 1943 and 1945. Royal Air Force Knettishall was declared surplus to RAF requirements after the war's end, it was closed in 1957. Most of the runways and buildings were demolished by the late 1960s, although some were still standing as ruins by 2000. The airfield itself remains in limited use by light general aviation aircraft to the present day.

== See also ==
- List of former Royal Air Force stations
