= Edward B. Burdett =

United States Air Force general

- Born: March 10, 1921; Macon, Georgia, U.S.
- Died: November 18, 1967 (aged 46); North Vietnam
- Burial place: Arlington National Cemetery
- Military career
- Allegiance: United States
- Branch: United States Army Air Forces (1943–47); United States Air Force (1947–67)
- Service years: 1943–1967
- Rank: Brigadier General
- Commands: 388th Tactical Fighter Wing; 48th Tactical Fighter Wing
- Conflicts: World War II; Vietnam War
- Awards: Silver Star; Legion of Merit (2); Soldier's Medal; Distinguished Flying Cross (5); Purple Heart

Edward Burke Burdett (March 10, 1921 – November 18, 1967) was a brigadier general in the United States Air Force who was one of the highest-ranked American military officers killed during the Vietnam War. Burdett was the 388th Tactical Fighter Wing commander. While flying an F-105 Thunderchief, he was hit by an SA-2 surface-to-air missile and was forced to eject. Burdett was captured, but he died the same day on November 18, 1967. He was buried in Arlington National Cemetery.
