= Sharon K.G. Dunbar =

US Air Force general

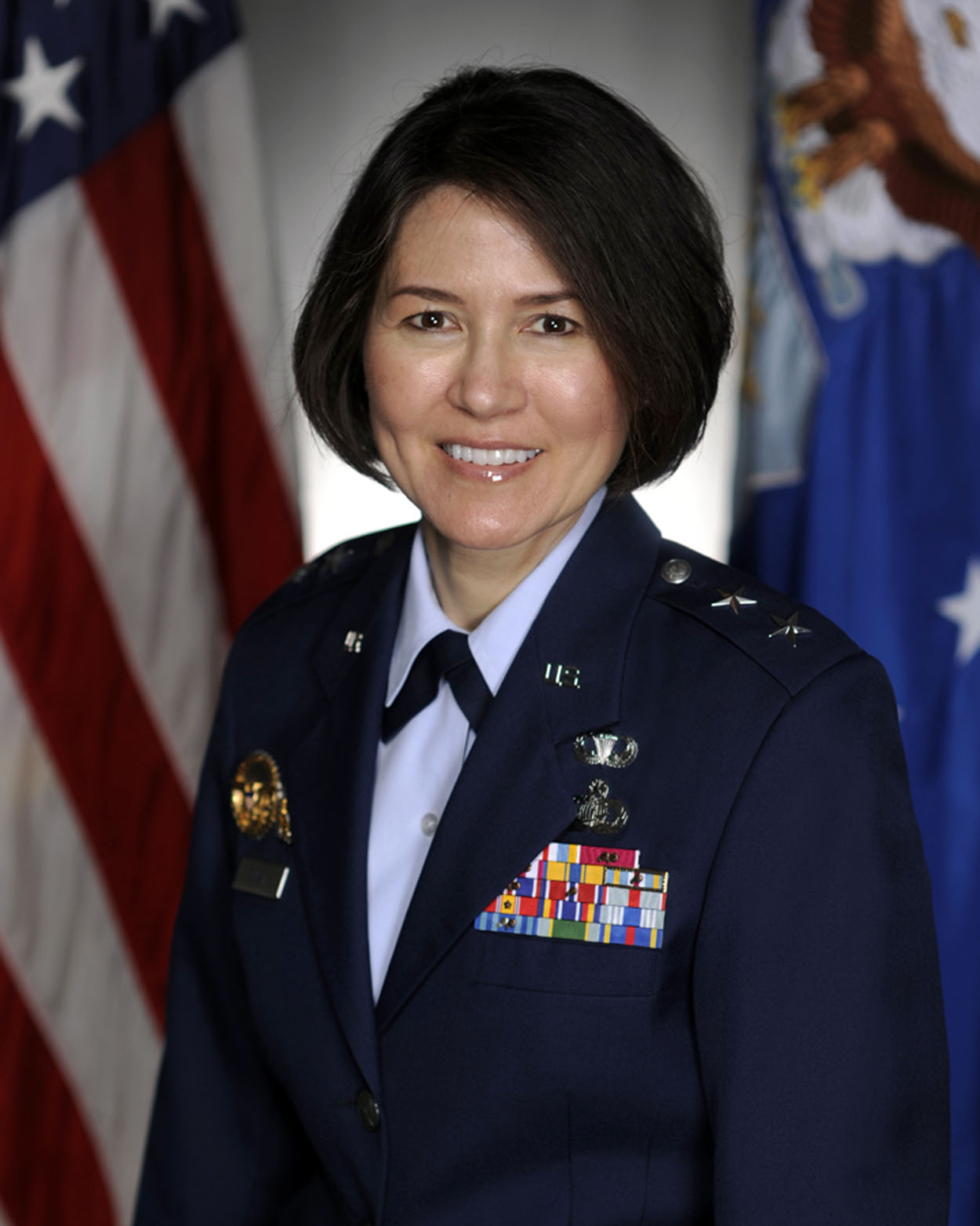
- Major General Sharon K.G. Dunbar
- Military career
- Allegiance: United States
- Branch: United States Air Force
- Service years: 1982 to 2014
- Rank: Major General
- Commands: Air Force District of Washington; 320th Air Expeditionary Wing; 75th Air Base Wing; 737th Training Group; 97th Support Group; 97th Mission Support Squadron
- Awards: Air Force Distinguished Service Medal (2); Defense Superior Service Medal; Legion of Merit (2); Meritorious Service Medal (5); Air Force Commendation Medal; Joint Meritorious Unit Award; Parachutist Jump Wings; Expert Marksmanship

Major General Sharon K.G. (Kim Greiman) Dunbar is a retired United States Air Force general officer. She was the first female in Air Force history to serve as Commanding General of the Air Force District of Washington (AFDW), the Air Force component to the Joint Force Headquarters National Capital Region, and Commander of the 320th Air Expeditionary Wing, both headquartered at Joint Base Andrews, Maryland. In this unique dual-command position, Dunbar oversaw Air Force operations in the National Capital Region with specific responsibilities for organizing, training and equipping combat forces for aerospace expeditionary operations as well as for continuity of government associated with homeland security response, disaster relief, civil support operations, and national special security events. She was likewise the senior Air Force officer responsible for the execution of major ceremonial events such as the 57th Presidential Inauguration in 2013. As the AFDW Commander, Dunbar provided major command-level support for 60,000 military and civilian personnel assigned worldwide and was the Uniform Code of Military Justice authority for 40,000 Airmen.

== Military career ==
The highest ranking Air Force officer of Korean descent, Dunbar was commissioned in 1982 upon graduation from the U.S. Air Force Academy and graduated with distinction from the National War College in Washington, D.C. Her military career encompassed a series of procurement, manpower, political-military, and command positions. As a Major, she was chosen to be the Air Force's first congressional fellow and was assigned to serve in the U.S. Senate for Senator Dan Coats (R-IN), Chairman of the Air/Land Forces and Personnel Subcommittees on the Senate Armed Services Committee and a respected bi-partisan voice on defense and acquisition reform. Coats assigned Dunbar to author the pivotal legislative initiative in 1996 known as the Quadrennial Defense Review (QDR). She then served as the military assistant to the Honorable Rudy de Leon and went on to command a mission support squadron, Air Force Basic Military Training, and the 75th Air Base Wing at Hill Air Force Base, Utah where she also served as the first female installation commander. In addition to these military assignments, Dunbar was appointed by the Secretary of Defense to serve on two separate congressionally-mandated Task Forces convened to address sexual assault and harassment in the military services and their respective military service academies. She was later appointed by the Secretary of the Air Force to direct the Air Force Follow-On Review in response to the 2009 Fort Hood shooting as well as to lead the Air Force's repeal of Don't Ask, Don't Tell in 2011.

U.S. Air Force (USAF) Maj. Gen. Sharon K.G. Dunbar, the commander of the Air Force District of Washington, addresses members of the USAF before a dress rehearsal for the inaugural parade.

== Personal life ==
Dunbar and her brother were born in the Chicago area and raised in the twin cities of Bloomington-Normal, Illinois by American parents who were immigrants from Korea (mother) and Germany (father). Immediately upon graduating from high school, her brother attended the United States Military Academy at West Point and she was accepted into the third class of females to attend the United States Air Force Academy in Colorado Springs. Dunbar and her husband met during their first year at the Air Force Academy. They married shortly after their graduation and have two children. Dunbar retired from the Air Force after 32 years of service and has since worked in the aerospace-defense industry while serving on government advisory committees and non-profit boards. She completed her doctoral studies in Public Policy at The George Washington University and received an honorary doctorate from Union Institute and University.

== Education ==
- 1982 Bachelor of Science degree in engineering and management, U.S. Air Force Academy, Colorado Springs, Colorado
- 1984 Master's degree in business administration, California State University, Long Beach, California
- 1985 Squadron Officer School, Maxwell Air Force Base, Alabama
- 1993 Kellogg National Fellowship Program, W.K. Kellogg Foundation, Battle Creek, Michigan
- 1994 Air Command and Staff College
- 1996 Legislative Fellowship Program, Brookings Institution, D.C.
- 1998 Advanced Program Managers Course, Defense Systems Management College, Fort Belvoir, Virginia
- 1999 MIT Seminar XXI, Foreign Politics, International Relations and the National Interest, Massachusetts Institute of Technology, Cambridge, Massachusetts
- 2000 Master's degree in national security studies, Distinguished Graduate, National War College, Fort Lesley J. McNair, D.C.
- 2005 Senior Executive Fellows Program, Harvard University, Cambridge, Massachusetts
- 2009 Challenges in Global Leadership, Judge Business School, University of Cambridge, England
- 2009 Program for Senior Managers in Government, Harvard University, Cambridge, Massachusetts

== Military awards and decorations ==
- Air Force Distinguished Service Medal with oak leaf cluster
- Defense Superior Service Medal
- Legion of Merit with two oak leaf clusters
- Meritorious Service Medal with four oak leaf clusters
- Air Force Commendation Medal
- Joint Meritorious Unit Award with oak leaf cluster
- Air Force Outstanding Unit Award with two oak leaf clusters
- Air Force Organizational Excellence Award with oak leaf cluster
- Air Force Recognition Ribbon
- National Defense Service Medal with bronze star
- Global War on Terrorism Service Medal

== See also ==
- List of female United States military generals and flag officers
- List of Korean Americans
