= Balefill =

Type of landfill

A balefill is a type of landfill (municipal solid waste disposal) where solid waste is compacted and baled, typically held together with steel strapping or wrapped in plastic.

This substantially reduces the volume of trash and hauling volume, allowing a better use of landfill space. It's especially advantageous in humid or wet areas as it produces a low volume of leachate.

== Balefill locations ==
United States

- Dickson County, Tennessee, 14 acres (5.7 ha) balefill section opened 1990, partially closed 1996
- Tooele County, Utah balefill at Tekoi, Skull Valley Indian Reservation, operated by Waste Management of Utah; balefill section operated until 2010; bales were approximately 45 inches (1,100 mm) x 45 inches (1,100 mm) x 60 inches (1,500 mm) and weighed 4,000 pounds (1,800 kg). 40.358323°N 112.724416°W
- St. Paul, Minnesota's American Systems Incorporated high-density baling facility, a division of the American Hoist & Derrick Company. It was located in downtown St. Paul, just west of the St. Paul Downtown Airport. In a 1972-1974 study, the bales were measured as averaging 1.04 metres (3 ft 5 in) wide, 1.35 metres (4 ft 5 in) long, and 1.12 metres (3 ft 8 in) high, and tended to expand in width and length by approximately 10% over the first week (the height only expanded by 4%). Bales weighed an average 1,282 kilograms (2,826 lb), and transported to the balefill with 14 bales on a truck. They were then stacked three bales high. Over 98,000 tonnes (96,000 long tons; 108,000 short tons) of waste were baled into almost 76,000 bales during a one-year study period, The baling plant was sold and closed in June 1974.
- San Diego, California's shredder and low-pressure baler, started in approximately 1968
- Pasco, Washington balefill, operated 1976–1989. It was a Superfund site due to hazardous substance disposal in a zone immediately next to the balefill, with cleanup beginning in 1996. The balefill then smoldered in a subsurface fire starting in late 2013. After failed attempts at quenching (covering) and injecting liquid carbon dioxide (to remove heat), the fire was extinguished two years later. Another fire was detected in 2017. 46.252253°N 119.0544037°W
- Cook County, Illinois - a balefill operated by the Solid Waste Agency of Northern Cook County was planned in the mid-1980s. An initial 1990 application was rejected by the United States Army Corps of Engineers in 1991 over "unmitigatable impacts to the aquatic environment" of wetlands on the site. A second application was filed in 1992 and rejected by the Corps in 1994. After a district court ruling against the balefill in 1998, followed by a Seventh Circuit appeal also against the balefill in 1994, it was heard by the US Supreme Court as Solid Waste Agency of Northern Cook County v. Army Corps of Engineers and a decision was ruled in January 2001 in favor of the balefill, stating the Corps had overreached on their migratory bird rule authority. A $12 million baling facility with three balers opened in 1999, with bales going to Waste Management's Pheasant Run landfill in Bristol, Wisconsin.
- Tinton Falls, Monmouth County, New Jersey, baling began in 1976, the balefill section opened in 1997
- North Arlington, New Jersey - the Bergen County Baler Facility and Balefill Landfill, both closed, and the HMDC Solid Waste Baler Facility, which now only handles standard waste transfer, not baling
- Casper, Wyoming operates a balefill facility with two balers and balefill. Baling began in the 1980s.
- St. Lucie County, Florida operates a baling facility and balefill, converted from a standard landfill
- Bristol, Virginia formerly operated a baling facility and balefill for the plastic-wrapped bales
- Omaha, Nebraska operated a balefill facility in the 1970s, closing it in 1982. The Lauritzen Botanical Gardens were placed atop the site beginning in 1993.
- Small balers (producing 400 pounds (180 kg) bales) are used in rural Alaska villages, including Kotzebue, Alaska, Naknek, Alaska, Unalakleet, Alaska

Canada

- Colchester County, Nova Scotia, Canada operates a baling facility
- Iqaluit, Nunavut Territory, Canada converted their landfill to a balefill with baler in 2019–2020.
