= 75th Air Base Wing =

75th Air Base Wing

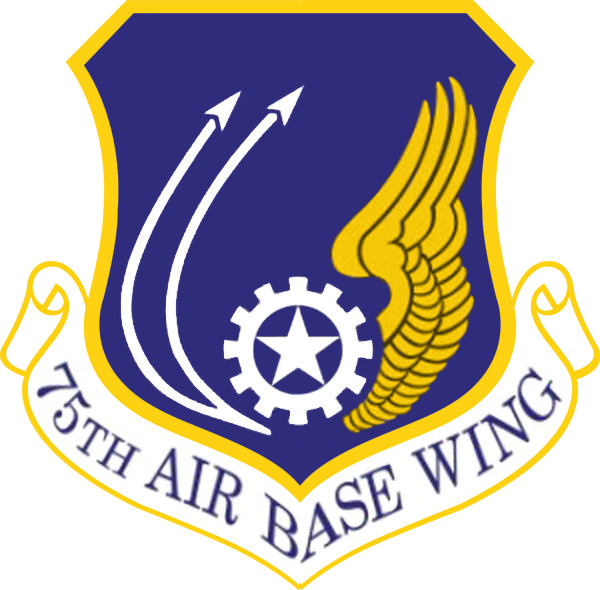
- 75th Air Base Wing emblem
- Active: 1942–1944; 1966–1971; 1994–present
- Country: United States
- Branch: United States Air Force
- Role: Base support
- Part of: Air Force Materiel Command
- Garrison/HQ: Hill Air Force Base
- Mascot: Buffalo
- Decorations: Air Force Outstanding Unit Award

Commanders
- Current commander: Colonel Eric B. Quidley
- Notable commanders: Sharon K.G. Dunbar

The 75th Air Base Wing is a wing of the United States Air Force which administers Hill Air Force Base, Ogden Utah. It provides services for the Ogden Air Logistics Complex, the 388th, 419th Fighter Wing, 84th Combat Sustainment Wing, 309th Maintenance Wing, 526th ICBM Systems Wing, 508th Aircraft Sustainment Wing and 25 associate units.

The wing's first predecessor was the 75th Observation Group. Until the fall of 1942, the group aided ground units with their training by flying reconnaissance, artillery adjustment, strafing, and dive bombing missions. The 75th participated in the 1942 Louisiana Maneuvers. It functioned primarily as a replacement training unit from 1943–1944, and also conducted a Ground Liaison Officer course from January–April 1944. The 75th was inactivated in May 1944.

The 75th Tactical Reconnaissance Wing was activated in May 1966. It performed RF-4C replacement training from February 1967 – August 1970, and tactical reconnaissance from July 1966 – July 1971. On inactivation in 1971, the 75th's resources passed to the 67th Tactical Reconnaissance Wing.

The wing and group were consolidated in 1984, but the consolidated unit remained inactive. The 75th was reactivated in 1994 to provide services and support for the Ogden Air Logistics Center and its tenant organizations at Hill Air Force Base.

== Lineage ==
75th Tactical Reconnaissance Group

- Constituted as the 75 Observation Group on 5 February 1942

Activated on 2 March 1942
Redesignated 75 Reconnaissance Group on 2 April 1943
Redesignated 75 Tactical Reconnaissance Group on 11 August 1943
Disbanded on 1 May 1944
Reconstituted on 17 May 1966
Consolidated with the 75 Tactical Reconnaissance Wing as the 75 Tactical Reconnaissance Wing on 31 Jan 1984

75 Tactical Reconnaissance Wing

Constitured as the 75 Tactical Reconnaissance Wing and activated on 17 May 1966 (not organized)
Organized on 1 July 1966
Inactivated on 15 July 1971
Consolidated with the 75 Tactical Reconnaissance Group on 31 January 1984
Redesignated 75 Air Base Wing on 16 September 1994
Activated on 1 October 1994

=== Assignments ===
- Air Force Combat Command, 2 March 1942
- 2nd Air Support Command, 12 March 1942
- III Ground Air Support Command (later, III Air Support Command; III Reconnaissance Command), c. 24 May 1942
- I Tactical Air Division, 18 April 1944 – 1 May 1944
- Tactical Air Command, 17 May 1966 (not organized)
- 835th Air Division, 1 July 1966
- Twelfth Air Force, 24 December 1969 – 15 July 1971
- Ogden Air Logistics Center (later Ogden Air Logistics Complex), 1 October 1994 (attached to Air Force Sustainment Center after 12 July 2012)
- Air Force Sustainment Center, 1 October 2012 – present

=== Components ===
- 4th Tactical Reconnaissance Squadron: 18 November 1966 – 15 July 1971
- 9th Tactical Reconnaissance Squadron: 1 September 1969 – 15 July 1971
- 14th Tactical Reconnaissance Squadron: 1 April 1967 – 6 November 1967 (detached after 25 October 1967)
- 21st Observation (later, 21 Reconnaissance; 21 Tactical Reconnaissance) Squadron: 12 March 1942 – 1 May 1944
- 30th Observation (later, 30 Reconnaissance; 30 Tactical Reconnaissance) Squadron: 12 March 1942 – 1 May 1944
- 91st Tactical Reconnaissance Squadron: 1 July 1967 – 15 July 1971
- 124th Observation (later, 124 Reconnaissance; 124 Tactical Reconnaissance) Squadron: 12 March 1942 – 1 May 1944 (detached 3 July 1942 – 4 January 1943)
- 127th Observation (later, 127 Liaison) Squadron: 12 March 1942 – 11 August 1943.

=== Current subordinate organizations ===
75th Operations Support Squadron (75 OSS)

75th Civil Engineering Group (75 CEG)

- 75th Civil Engineering Squadron (75 CES)
- 775th Civil Engineering Squadron (775 CES)

75th Comptroller Squadron (75 CPTS)

75th Mission Support Group (75 MSG)

- 75th Contracting Squadron (75 CONS)
- 75th Communications and Information Directorate (75 SC)
- 75th Logistics Readiness Squadron (75 LRS)
- 75th Force Support Squadron (75 FSS)
- 75th Security Forces Squadron (75 SFS)

75th Medical Group (75 MDG)

- 75th Operational Medicine Readiness Squadron (75 OMRS)
- 75th Dental Squadron (75 DS)
- 75th Healthcare Operations Squadron (75 HCOS)

=== Stations ===
- Ellington Field, Texas, 2 March 1942
- Birmingham Army Air Field, Alabama, 9 March 1942
- William Northern Field, Tennessee, 12 November 1942
- Key Field, Mississippi, 17 August 1943 – 1 May 1944
- Bergstrom Air Force Base, Texas, 1 July 1966 – 15 July 1971
- Hill Air Force Base, Utah, 1 October 1994 – present

=== Aircraft ===
- Douglas A-20 Havoc (1942–1943)
- North American B-25 Mitchell (1942–1943)
- Stinson L-1 Vigilant (1942–1943)
- Piper L-4 Grasshopper(1942–1943)
- Douglas O-38 (1942–1943)
- Douglas O-46 (1942–1943)
- North American O-47 (1942–1943)
- Curtiss O-52 Owl (1942–1943)
- Bell P-39 Airacobra (1943–1944)
- Curtiss P-40 Warhawk (1943–1944)
- North American P-51 Mustang (1943–1944)
- McDonnell RF-4 Phantom II (1966–1971)
