= Ployer Peter Hill =

American pilot (1894–1935)

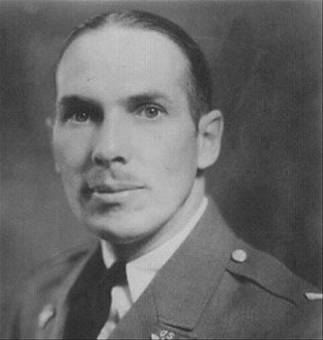
- Nickname: Pete
- Born: October 24, 1894; Newburyport, Massachusetts
- Died: October 30, 1935 (aged 41) Wright Field, Ohio
- Buried: Belleville Cemetery; Newburyport, Massachusetts
- Allegiance: United States
- Branch: U.S. Army Air Corps
- Service years: 1917–1935
- Rank: Major
- Alma mater: Brown University, 1916
- Spouse: Helen (Toppan) Hill Perry

Ployer Peter Hill (October 24, 1894 – October 30, 1935), known as "Pete" or "Peter", was a pilot and an officer with a varied career, but is best known for his abilities as a test pilot. In an aviation career that spanned eighteen years, Hill piloted nearly 60 of the Army Air Corps' newest aircraft, testing and evaluating their capabilities for service.

== Early life ==
Pete Hill was born in Newburyport, Massachusetts, on October 24, 1894, and attended grammar school and high school in his hometown. In 1916, he graduated from Brown University with a Bachelor of Science degree in Civil Engineering.

== Career ==
The following year, he enlisted in the Aviation Section of the U.S. Army Signal Enlisted Reserve Corps. In 1918, he received flight instruction at the School of Military Aeronautics at Cornell University, the Aviation Concentration Camp at Camp Dix in Dallas, Texas, and at Chanute Field in Rantoul, Illinois. Hill then accepted a commission as a 2nd lieutenant in the regular Army and served as a flying instructor before receiving instruction as a bombardment pilot.

In 1919, Hill served in the Office of the Chief of the Air Corps in Washington, D.C., then in 1920 was ordered to duty with the American Army of Occupation in Germany, where he served as the Engineer Officer of the Air Service Flying Station in Weissenthurm. In 1922, he was assigned to duty with the 12th Aero Squadron stationed at Fort Bliss in El Paso, Texas, then transferred back to Chanute Field for instruction in aerial photography. After completing the course, he stayed on as a student instructor.

In 1924, he returned to duty in Washington, D.C., in the Training and War Plans Division under the Chief of the Air Service. In 1925, he was ordered to duty at Mitchel Field, New York, where he was appointed Commanding Officer of the 14th Photo Section, a job he held until 1929. He then served as the Commanding Officer of the 6th Photo Section at Nichols Field in Manila.

In 1932, he returned to the United States and was assigned to Wright Field in Dayton, Ohio, where he served as a test pilot and Assistant Chief of Planes and Engines in the Maintenance Unit. In 1935, he was assigned as the Chief of the Flying Branch of the Material Division at Wright Field, with the temporary rank of Major. His duties involved the flight testing and evaluation of numerous new military aircraft designs at various contractors' plants, including the Consolidated P-30, Martin B-10, B-12, and many others.

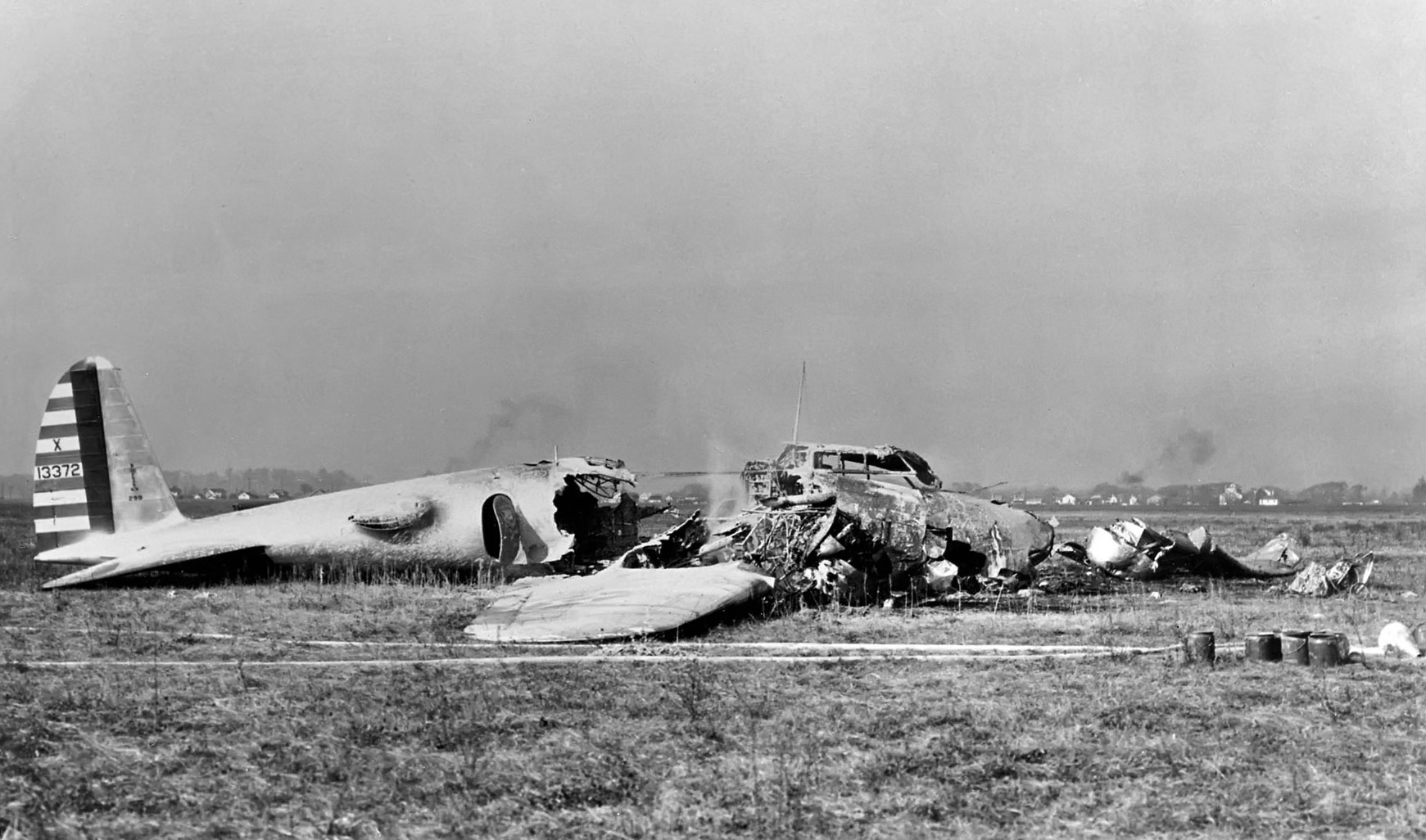
Crashed Model 299 at Wright Field, Ohio.

== Death ==
On October 30, 1935, Hill and Boeing's chief test pilot Leslie Tower died as a result of injuries sustained in the crash of the Boeing experimental aircraft Model 299 at Wright Field; three others on board survived.

The crash occurred because the crew neglected to remove the wind-gust locks, devices intended to keep the control surfaces from moving when the plane was on the ground.

This aircraft was the prototype of what later became the famous B-17 Flying Fortress of World War II. Major Hill was buried in Newburyport, Massachusetts, on November 3, 1935.

== Legacy ==
In 1939, the U.S. War Department named the site of the Ogden Air Depot "Hill Field" in honor of Major Ployer Peter Hill. In 1948, Hill Field was renamed Hill Air Force Base.
