= Solid Waste Agency of Northern Cook County v. Army Corps of Engineers =

Solid Waste Agency of Northern Cook Cty. v. Army Corps of Engineers
- Supreme Court of the United States

Argued October 31, 2000 Decided January 9, 2001
- Full case name: Solid Waste Agency of Northern Cook County. v. Army Corps of Engineers, et al.
- Citations: 531 U.S. 159 (more) 121 S. Ct. 675; 148 L. Ed. 2d 576; 2001 U.S. LEXIS 640

Case history
- Prior: 163 F.R.D. 268 (N.D. Ill. 1995); affirmed in part, reversed in part, 101 F.3d 503 (7th Cir. 1996); 998 F. Supp. 946 (N.D. Ill. 1998); affirmed; 191 F.3d 845 (7th Cir. 1999); cert. granted, 529 U.S. 1129 (2000).
- Subsequent: Remanded, 248 F.3d 1159 (7th Cir. 2001).

Holding
- The migratory bird rule exceeds the scope of the Clean Water Act, as interpreted by the EPA.

Court membership
- Chief Justice William Rehnquist Associate Justices John P. Stevens · Sandra Day O'Connor; Antonin Scalia · Anthony Kennedy; David Souter · Clarence Thomas; Ruth Bader Ginsburg · Stephen Breyer

Case opinions
- Majority: Rehnquist, joined by O'Connor, Scalia, Kennedy, Thomas
- Dissent: Stevens, joined by Souter, Ginsburg, Breyer

Laws applied
- Clean Water Act, 33 U.S.C. § 1344

Solid Waste Agency of Northern Cook County (SWANCC) v. U.S. Army Corps of Engineers, 531 U.S. 159 (2001), was a decision by the US Supreme Court that interpreted a provision of the Clean Water Act. Section 404 of the Act requires permits for the discharge of dredged or fill materials into "navigable waters," which is defined by the Act as "waters of the United States." That provision was the basis for the federal wetlands-permitting program.

The Court held that the use of the Corps of Engineers of the long-controversial "migratory bird rule," adopted by the Corps and Environmental Protection Agency (EPA) to interpret the reach of its Section 404 authority over discharges into "isolated waters" (including isolated wetlands), exceeded the authority that was granted by that section.

Long before the SWANCC case, there had been controversy and litigation over whether isolated waters that are not adjacent to true navigable waters are properly within the jurisdiction of Section 404. In 1985, the Supreme Court sustained the assertion by the Corps and EPA that waters and wetlands adjacent to navigable waters, interstate waters, or their tributaries are "waters of the United States" under Section 404. The question left for SWANCC was whether waters and wetlands not so adjacent, "isolated waters," are also so covered.

== Background ==
SWANCC, a consortium of Chicago-area cities and villages, sought to develop landfill for baled nonhazardous solid waste (balefill) on a 533-acre (2.16 km^{2}) parcel in Illinois. The parcel had been used for sand and gravel mining until about 1960. Since then, the excavation trenches from the mining had evolved into ponds ranging in size from a 'few feet across to several acres. SWANCC obtained the needed local and state permits, but the Corps, on the basis of the ponds and their use by migratory birds, asserted jurisdiction under section 404 and denied a permit.

Section 404 requires permits for discharges to dispose of dredged and fill material into the nation's navigable waters, such as when a landowner undertakes activity to develop or otherwise improve his or her property. To assess whether this requirement applies to a particular activity, a landowner must determine whether the disposal site is a "water of the United States" within CWA jurisdiction. The definitions of waters subject to CWA jurisdiction are contained in regulations of the Corps of Engineers and EPA, the agencies with primary responsibility for administering section 404. Through judicial interpretation and regulatory changes since the 1970s, the types of regulated waters have evolved from narrow to broad, and also to include wetlands. Congress has not amended section 404 since 1977, when it provided regulatory exemptions for categories of routine activities, such as normal farming and forestry.

The SWANCC site ponds are known in section 404 parlance as "isolated waters"- waters that are not traditionally navigable or interstate, nor tributaries thereof, nor adjacent to any of these. In 1985, the Supreme Court in United States v. Riverside Bayview Homes, Inc. upheld the Corps' authority under section 404 to regulate wetlands (and other waters) adjacent to navigable and interstate waters, and their tributaries. It expressly left open the question, however, whether isolated waters, not being adjacent, lie within the reach of section 404, or, for that matter, within Congress' power under the Commerce Clause of the Constitution. Both before and after Riverside Bayview, the lower courts have wrestled with these questions.

The Corps' assertion of jurisdiction over the isolated waters at the SWANCC site, as elsewhere, was based on a three-step argument. First, section 404 applies by its terms to "navigable waters," defined expansively by the CWA to mean "the waters of the United States." Second, under 1977 regulations the Corps defines "waters of the United States" broadly to include, in addition to traditionally navigable waters, interstate waters, their tributaries, and adjacent wetlands, the following -

[all] other waters such as intrastate lakes, rivers, streams (including intermittent streams), mudflats, sandflats, wetlands, sloughs, prairie potholes, wet meadows, playa lakes, or natural ponds, the use, degradation, or destruction of which could affect interstate commerce

Third, the Corps' migratory bird rule, a 1986 attempt by the agency to clarify the intrastate waters covered by this regulation, says that such "isolated waters" include those "which are or would be used as habitat by ... migratory birds that cross state lines ..." The Corps had found that the water areas on the SWANCC site are used as habitat by migratory birds that cross state lines.

In reading its section 404 jurisdiction broadly, the Corps was not without congressional support. In defining "navigable waters" as "waters of the United States," Congress "evidently intended to repudiate limits that had been placed on federal regulation by earlier water pollution control federal statutes ..." Indeed, the conference report accompanying enactment of the CWA in 1972 states that "[t]he conferees fully intend that the term 'navigable waters' be given the broadest possible constitutional interpretation ...'

The district court granted summary judgment to the Corps of Engineers on the jurisdictional issue. On appeal, the U.S. Court of Appeals for the Seventh Circuit ruled in favor of Corps jurisdiction as well. The Seventh Circuit found that Congress has the authority under the Commerce Clause of the Constitution to regulate isolated waters, and that Congress, in enacting section 404, intended to reach such waters. The Supreme Court reversed.

== Decision ==
The SWANCC ruling saw the Court divide 5-4. The five-justice majority opinion, in one reading, concluded only that the Corps and EPA could not continue to use the migratory bird rule to assert section 404 jurisdiction over isolated waters. "We conclude," said the Court at one point, that the 'Migratory Bird Rule' is not fairly supported by the CWA." The decision's rationale, however, was broader, appearing to preclude federal assertion of section 404 jurisdiction over isolated waters on any basis. Stated the Court: "In order to rule for [the Corps], we would have to hold that the jurisdiction of the Corps extends to ponds that are not adjacent to open water. But we conclude that the text of the statute will not allow this."

The Court deemed it unnecessary to reach the constitutional issue pressed by SWANCC: whether the EPA's interpretation of the CWA exceeded the power of Congress, under the Commerce Clause.

The majority opinion, written by Chief Justice Rehnquist, held that Congress, in enacting the 1977 amendments to the CWA, had not implicitly approved the Corps' broad definition of "navigable water" adopted that year under the original 1972 CWA. For example, Congress' failure to pass a bill in 1977 containing a narrow definition of navigable waters had not been shown by the Corps, said the majority, to constitute congressional approval of the Corps' broad definition. The majority then declined to afford the Corps the customary deference granted agency interpretations of ambiguous statutes. For one thing, it said that section 404 is not ambiguous at all. Even if it were, deference is not appropriate where an agency interpretation of a statute "invokes the outer limits of Congress' power," a reference to the Court's milestone decisions in recent years involving the reach of the Commerce Clause. That concern is particularly strong, it said, where the agency interpretation permits encroachment on a traditional state power, in this case land and water use.

=== Dissent ===
The dissent, written by Justice Stevens, stated that given Riverside Bayview, holding that the CWA went beyond navigable waters to embrace marshes and adjacent inland lakes would extend the CWA indefinitely. The 1972 CWA, in the dissent's view, offers no support for such a constraint, and the 1977 CWA amendment supports coverage of isolated waters. Moreover, the dissent declares that there is no Commerce Clause problem since the discharge of dredged and fill materials into "waters of the United States" is an economic activity that may be aggregated to show a substantial effect on interstate commerce.

== Impact ==
Estimates of waters and wetland acreage likely to be removed from the section 404 permitting program as a result of the SWANCC decision are very difficult to assess, in part because of questions about Corps and EPA interpretation of the ruling, but the decision may affect up to 79% of wetland acreage. One likely result is that case-by-case evaluations will then be required to determine if regulatory jurisdiction exists, the length of time to obtain section 404 permits will be longer than in the past. If federal jurisdiction is diminished, the responsibility to protect affected wetlands falls on states and local governments. A comprehensive picture of their ability to protect wetlands, under various possible state and local authorities, is difficult to draw together. Whether states will act to fill in the gap left by removal of some federal jurisdiction by new laws or programs raises difficult political and resource questions.

The SWANCC decision also raises issues for Congress. One is whether confusion that may now exist about the extent of Clean Water Act jurisdictional waters and wetlands should be resolved, as well as what constitutional limits may apply. Another is whether to provide federal resources and incentives to encourage expansion of state wetlands protection and regulatory programs or others that encourage acquisition and conservation of wetlands.

=== Legal implications ===
In 2001, the SWANCC decision continued the efforts of the five Supreme Court justices generally regarded as conservative to limit federal regulatory power. In 1995 and 2000, the same five justices found that Congress had exceeded Commerce Clause limits in enacting legislation dealing with possession of guns in school zones and violence against women. To be sure, the Supreme Court in SWANCC did not reach the constitutional question, but rather disposed of the case on purely statutory grounds. Nonetheless, its analysis of the CWA has, as noted, a strong undercurrent of the same Commerce Clause and federalism concerns. In not addressing the constitutional issue, SWANCC resembles another recent Commerce Clause decision in which, as in SWANCC, the Court used the possibility of Commerce Clause issues being raised by a broad interpretation of a federal statute to support its adoption of a narrow reading. The Court did not grant a petition for certiorari in a similar Commerce Clause challenge to the Endangered Species Act.

The problem underlying the SWANCC decision arises largely from the history of some jurisdictional terms used by Congress in water-related statutes. In the 19th century and first half of the 20th century, Congress set the scope of many such statutes as the "navigable waters" of the United States.This made sense because Congress was focused on fostering waterborne commerce, and the Supreme Court had obliged by articulating a broad vision of federal power over navigation. A prominent example, and a forerunner of the CWA, was the Rivers and Harbors Act of 1899, particularly its section 13 known as the "Refuse Act." With the shift in emphasis in the mid-20th century from protection of navigation to protection of the environment, however, the phrase "navigable waters" was no longer a comfortable fit. Notwithstanding, Congress used "navigable waters" in 1972 when it wrote the CWA, including section 404, accommodating the broader concerns of environmental protection by defining "navigable waters" expansively to mean "waters of the United States." The question in SWANCC was whether this definition entirely removed the "navigable" qualifier from the Act or merely limited it. The justices in the majority opted for the latter and were unwilling to go beyond the erosion of that qualifier that had already been accepted by the Court in Riverside Bayview.

SWANCCs implications for the scope of the federal wetlands permitting program are certain to be significant, but it will take years of litigation before they are fully clear. A key source of confusion is the aforementioned disconnect between the decision's narrow holding and broad rationale. The latter appears to preclude any effort by the Corps to assert jurisdiction over isolated waters, including isolated wetlands, on the basis of linkages with interstate commerce other than the interstate flight of migratory birds. (The Corps asserted such non-migratory-bird linkages after the litigation commenced, noting that SWANCC's municipal landfill is clearly of a commercial nature and, when aggregated with similar activity elsewhere, would substantially affect interstate commerce. The Supreme Court declined to consider this argument, pointing out that landfill activity is a "far cry" from the "waters of the United States" to which the CWA extends.) Plainly, the degree of section 404 program contraction occasioned by SWANCC will depend on which aspects of the decision shape the government's response.

On that point, a legal memorandum issued by the Corps and EPA on January 19, 2001, stays more closely to the narrow holding but in tentative terms. The memorandum notes the above-discussed difference between the SWANCC rationale and holding, and takes a case-by-case approach as to the waters falling within the coverage gap (last item below). In summary, the memorandum asserts:

• Traditionally navigable waters, interstate waters, their tributaries, and wetlands adjacent to each are still covered. • Intrastate waters that could affect interstate commerce solely by virtue of their use as habitat for migratory birds are no longer covered. • As to intrastate waters having other (non-migratory bird) connections to interstate commerce, staff is advised to consult agency legal counsel. For example, waters that are isolated and intrastate but nonetheless navigable (such as the Great Salt Lake in Utah) may still support jurisdiction "if their use, degradation, or destruction could affect interstate or foreign commerce."

The guidance goes on to state its view that the SWANCC holding, while important, is "limited," and must be interpreted in light of other Supreme Court precedents "which... broadly uphold CWA jurisdictional authority."

Another source of uncertainty for the wetlands permitting program will be the extent to which, lacking any clear authority over isolated waters now, the Corps may seek to recharacterize wetlands from that category to ones over which its section 404 authority remains undisputed. For example, the concept of traditionally-navigable waters is an elastic one, covering all waters that are now navigable, were once navigable, or could reasonably be made navigable in the future. Another example is the "adjacent wetlands" jurisdiction upheld in Riverside Bayview. One might think the concept of adjacency to be relatively clear, but in Riverside Bayview itself, the wetlands in question were only "near" the shores of the lake, "part o/a wetland that actually abuts on a navigable waterway." The Court expressly noted that the concept of adjacent wetlands includes those adjacent wetlands "that are not the result of flooding or permeation by water having its source in adjacent bodies of water," approving the Corps' view that wetlands may affect the water quality of adjacent waterbodies by functioning as integral parts of the same aquatic environment.

By interpreting the scope of "waters of the United States" as used in section 404, SWANCC will affect the scope of other CWA sections whose jurisdictional scope is defined by that same phrase. Such sections include those governing oil spill cleanup (section 311), the National Pollutant Discharge Elimination System permit program (section 402), and state water quality certification (section 401).

=== Policy implications ===
Since the Court's actual holding concerning CWA regulation was narrow, while its rationale was wider ranging (as discussed above), the policy implications of how much the SWANCC decision restricts federal regulation depend on how broadly or narrowly the opinion is applied. Two scenarios are possible. A broad reading would be interpreted as knocking out all section 404 jurisdiction and Corps regulation of isolated waters and wetlands. However, a narrow reading, one asserting that jurisdiction will be found lacking only if the sole connection to interstate commerce is the presence of migratory birds and wildlife, would allow federal regulation of some isolated waters to continue (such as in waters that are used by interstate travelers for recreation).

The question of which view the government would take was answered in a January 19 memorandum issued jointly by EPA and the Corps for headquarters and field/regional staff who work on the section 404 program, discussed above; the agencies provide a legal interpretation, based on a narrow reading of the Court's decision.

A key policy question that may not be clearly answered for some time is how regulatory protection of wetlands will be affected or reduced as a result of the decision. Many types of isolated wetlands are not physically adjacent to navigable waters and under a broad reading of the decision, would lack regulation. Major wetland types that potentially would not be regulated include prairie potholes of the Upper Midwest, wet meadows, river fringing wetlands along small non-navigable rivers and streams, lake fringing wetlands for smaller non-navigable lakes, many forested wetlands, playas and vernal ponds of Texas and other areas of the west, seeps and spring, flats, bogs and large amounts of tundra in Alaska. A new report by the Department of Interior's Fish and Wildlife Service estimates that in 1997, there were 105,500,000 acres (427,000 km^{2}) of wetlands on public and private lands in the conterminous United States and that between 1986 and 1997, a net of 644,000 acres (2,610 km^{2}) of wetlands was lost. According to an analysis prepared by the Association of State Wetland Managers (ASWM), accurate estimates of impacts of the decision on wetland resources are not possible, in part because of uncertainty about how key terms in the opinion (such as "adjacent" and "tributary") will be defined, whether broadly or narrowly. Still, ASWM believes that impacts are likely to be environmentally significant.

Tentative state estimates which have been provided to the Association of State Wetland Managers suggest 30% to 79% of total wetland acreage may be affected.... Even if SWANCC results in only a one percent loss of America's wetlands, the decision would cause more wetlands to be destroyed than were lost in the past decade.

Scientists recognize the value of wetlands on the basis of a range of physical functions that they perform. One group of functions relates to water quality. Wetlands are good water filters: they remove and retain nutrients, they process chemical and organic wastes, and they reduce sediment loads to receiving waters. Wetlands also provide flood damage protection to urban and agricultural lands by storing flood waters that overflow river banks or surface waters and by collecting waters in isolated depressions. Wetlands recharge groundwater reserves that are hydrological: connected to surface waters. According to a 1995 National Research Council report, many of these functions occur irrespective of whether the wetlands are isolated or contiguous to navigable waters because of groundwater connections between isolate) wetlands and surface waters. Small, shallow wetlands that are isolated from rivers are frequently important to waterfowl, the NRC said, for food and forage. Also, sites that are intermittently flooded, even those that may be completely dry for several years, can be important for storing flood waters and can have distinctive water-dependent biota (plants and animals) that persist over dry intervals but return when water return to the site.

The SWANCC decision affects not only privately owned lands but also isolated waters and wetlands on public lands: the federal government owns about one- third of the nation's lands. As a result of the Court's decision, federal agency decisions on these lands affecting isolated wetlands will no longer be subject to section 404 permitting, but they will still be subject to requirements of the National Environmental Policy Act and Executive Orders dealing with wetlands, floodplain management, and protection of migratory birds.

In addition to the section 404 program, questions arise about impacts of the SWANCC ruling on other parts of the CWA, especially its principal permit program, the National Pollutant Discharge Elimination System (NPDES) program under section 402. It requires permits for pollutant discharges from point sources (industrial facilities and municipal sewage plants) into the nation's waters. Another provision, section 311, concerns liability for oil discharges into the nation's waters. Neither was at issue in this case but might be challenged through extension of the ruling. The January 19 joint Corps-EPA memorandum states that federal implementation of any other CWA provision that involves "waters of the United States" will be governed by the same interpretation that applies to section 404. As a result, federal jurisdiction to require NPDES permits or assess oil spill liability in some isolated waters could be limited. Such impacts will become clearer in time.

=== State authority ===
As noted previously, prior to SWANCC, virtually all US wetlands were, at least theoretically, subject to regulation under section 404. As federal jurisdiction is diminished, the responsibility to protect affected wetlands falls on states primarily and local governments, which also regulate some wetlands. State and local wetlands regulatory programs focus primarily upon navigable waters, tributaries, and adjacent wetlands. They supplement but do not substitute for federal jurisdiction. According to the Association of State Wetland Managers (ASWM), 14 states have some form of regulatory program for freshwater wetlands, but they are quite variable. Differences exist in part because freshwater wetland types vary greatly across the nation and because of differing state preferences. Some of the state programs are very comprehensive, but regulations in many of the 14 states are limited by wetland size, mapping requirements, and exemptions for specified activities. According to ASWM, state regulations do not generally apply to federal lands. Some of the states with the largest isolated wetland acreages provide little or no state protection, including Alaska, Louisiana, Texas, North Dakota, South Dakota, South Carolina, North Carolina, Georgia, Nebraska, Kansas, and Mississippi.

Changes in section 404 jurisdiction would diminish use of one tool used by many states to control activities affecting wetlands. In recent years, most states have used CWA section 401 water quality certification programs in addition to or in lieu of specific regulatory statutes. Section 401 requires that before a federal permit or license is issued, states must certify that the project complies with water quality standards. That authority effectively gives states a veto power on the federal permit or the ability to require conditions that become part of a permit. State water quality certification has been used by a number of states to control activities affecting wetlands without having to independently establish state permitting and enforcement programs. However, if federal jurisdiction does not exist and no section 404 or other federal permit is required, section 401 certification also is not required and so is not available as a tool for the state to evaluate the proposed activity.

A number of states without wetlands laws on their books still have other state environmental laws dealing with water quality or natural resources, and they may already provide substantial authority to regulate wetlands. However, a comprehensive picture of states' ability to protect wetlands, under various possible authorities, is difficult to draw together. To fill in the gap left by removal of some federal regulatory jurisdiction, states could adopt more comprehensive wetlands regulatory statutes or wetland amendments to state pollution control statutes (possibly including independent water quality certification programs) and rules. The latter, for example, could integrate wetlands, water quality, and watershed management. States do not have the constitutional constraints that the federal government does in enacting legislation (whether a legislative action exceeds Congress' power under the Commerce Clause). Also, CWA section 404(t) expressly provides that the existence of section 404 does not preempt state law governing the discharge of dredged or fill material. However, whether states will take steps to expand wetlands protection in response to the Court's decision raises difficult political and resource questions. It is quite likely that, among states, the SWANCC decision pleases some states and is opposed by others.

== Rapanos ==
Some of the issues left open by SWANCC were resolved by the Supreme Court's subsequent ruling in Rapanos v. United States. In Rapanos, the Court further narrowed the scope of the term "waters of the United States," which "include[] only those relatively permanent, standing or continuously flowing bodies of water 'forming geographic features' that are described in ordinary parlance as 'streams[,] ... oceans, rivers, [and] lakes.'"

== See also ==
- List of United States Supreme Court cases, volume 531
- List of United States Supreme Court cases
