= F-35A Demonstration Team =

USAF solo demo aircraft

F-35A Lightning II Demonstration Team
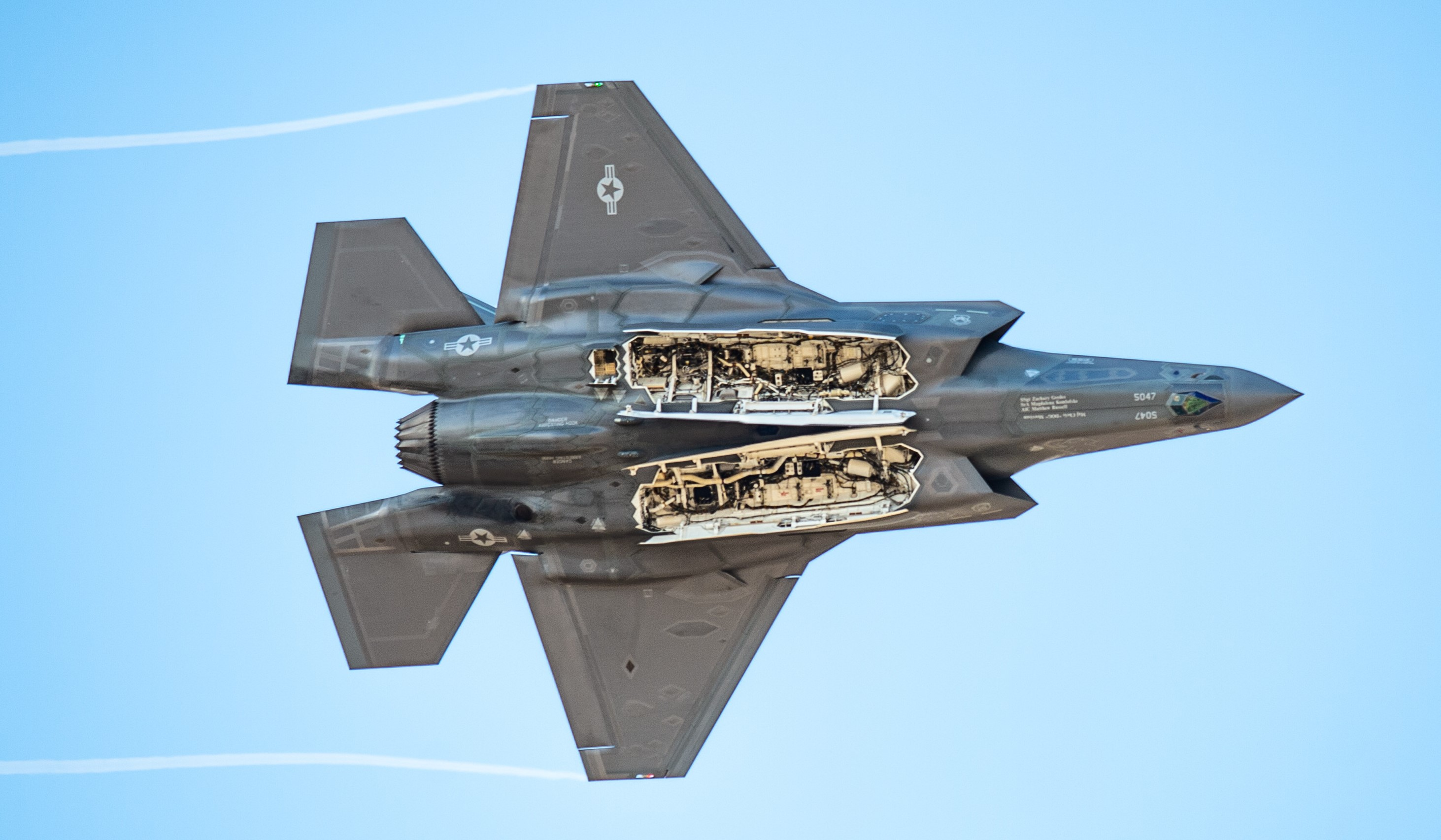
- The F-35A Demo Team performs a weapons bay doors pass
- Active: 2018–present
- Country: United States
- Branch: United States Air Force
- Role: Aerobatic display team
- Size: 1 officer 11 enlisted support personnel
- Part of: Air Combat Command
- Garrison/HQ: Luke Air Force Base; Glendale, Arizona
- Equipment: F-35A Lightning II
- Website: https://www.388fw.acc.af.mil/F-35A-Demo-Team/

Commanders
- Current Commander: Major Sean "Rambo" Loughlin

The F-35A Lightning II Demonstration Team is a United States Air Force flight demonstration team under the 56th Fighter Wing currently stationed at Luke Air Force Base in Glendale, Arizona. The team flies the USAF's F-35A fighter jet at airshows performing air maneuvers that demonstrate the supermaneuverability of the F-35A. Examples of these demonstrations include the minimum radius turn to high alpha loop, weapons bay door pass, pedal turn, slow speed to power climb and tactical pitch.

The demonstration team was founded in late 2018 and was originally stationed at Luke Air Force Base in Arizona, It moved to Hill Air Force Base in 2019. Where then it was moved back to Luke Air Force Base in 2026.

The current demonstration pilot and commander of the team is Major Sean "Rambo" Loughlin. Loughlin took over command of the role after Major Melanie "Mach" Kluesner. Kluesner took over for the former demonstration pilot and team commander, Major Kristin "Beo" Wolfe in March of 2024. Wolfe took over the former team commander, Maj. Andrew “Dojo” Olson in 2019.
