= Tekoi =

Military technology test facility in Utah

Tekoi Test Range
- Utah in United States of America

Site information
- Type: Rocket Motor Testing Facility
- Owner: Goshute tribe

Location
- Coordinates: 40°22′09″N 112°46′06″W

Site history
- Built by: Hercules Inc.
- Fate: Abandoned

Tekoi Rocket Test Range is a former solid fuel rocket motor test and calibration site operated by Hercules Aerospace near the Utah Test and Training Range in Utah's West Desert, approximately 80 miles (130 km) west of Salt Lake City, Utah. It is located on the Goshute's Skull Valley Indian Reservation.

== History ==
=== Hercules ===
The Tekoi rocket testing facility was constructed in 1976 for machining, testing and calibration of solid rocket booster motors by Hercules Aerospace's Utah Aerospace Division; Hercules developed double-base propellants. By 1990, Hercules used 35 acres of their 3500-acre lease held through the Bureau of Indian Affairs and employed 17 people on site. Hercules employed approximately 3000 people 75 miles away at their Baccus Works in Magna, Utah for solid fuel motor construction in 1990; by 1992, as the MGM-134 Midgetman contracts closed, the employment was reduced to about 1000. Hercules designed the Nike Ajax M5E1 steel-tubed solid fuel motor, used as the Nike Hercules XM-42 (first stage) package, which contained four of the M5E1 motors; approximately 25,000 Nike Hercules were produced. Hercules also designed the Orion rocket motors, the MK12 (used for the RIM-67A) and MK70 (RIM-67C), and the MK11 Talos.

Hercules designed the Pershing II missile first and second-stage motors, then tested them at Tekoi in 1980. The engines used HTPB in the fuel casting, EPDM insulation, and Kevlar casings to save weight.

In 1986, Hercules designed and tested the second and third-stage solid fuel motors for the MGM-134 Midgetman at the site. The motors used a graphite filament-wound case to reduce weight and NEPE fuel composition that was previously tested and flown on the Peacekeeper's SR120 second stage.

Tekoi was a listed SLBM inspectable site for the START nuclear arms-reduction treaty with Russia, covering the Trident II SLBM (Submarine launched ballistic missile).

Hercules Aerospace was purchased by Alliant Techsystems in 1995; Alliant tested the Delta III motor at Tekoi in the late 1990s. In 2001, Alliant purchased Thiokol and transferred remaining testing to their Promontory, Utah facility; Alliant became Orbital ATK in 2015, which became Northrop Grumman Innovation Systems in 2018, which became the Northrop Grumman Space Systems Group in 2020. Solid rocket boosters are still tested and calibrated at Promontory.

The Intermediate-Range Nuclear Forces Treaty (INF Treaty), active from 1987 to 2019, required the US to destroy the Pershing IA and II missiles. This was planned to occur at Tekoi by "static burning" the solid fuel motors, leading to objections by environmental groups in Utah. The destruction took place at Longhorn Army Ammunition Plant in Texas instead.

Hercules employed several Goshute tribal members as of the mid-1990s, and revenue from the Tekoi lease was about 90% of the tribe's income. Around 1995, approximately 30 members were living on the reservation and 119 enrolled in the tribe. The lease was not renewed in 1995 and the on-reservation tribal population dropped sharply by 1999; no money came from the lease, no tribal members worked there, and only about 15 members lived on the reservation. Tribe members accused their chairman of trying to raise the lease price by a multiple of 4 or 5, which caused the lease to not be renewed.

== Return ==
The land has been given back to the Skull Valley Indian Reservation. The Utah Film Commission advertises Tekoi as a film location, stating "visitors can expect dilapidated bunkers, military watchtowers, sprawling barren landscapes, and razor wire fencing along the perimeter - all with a post-apocalyptic feel." The area is private property. YouTuber CGP Grey has documented a public video where he explores the Tekoi site.

Deseret UAS had a lease to test on the site in 2019, testing and demonstrating hazmat response drones. (Note: See also XTI TriFan 600.)

== Nuclear disposal ==
The Goshute tribe had planned on allowing the Private Fuel Storage consortium to store 44,000 tons of high-level nuclear waste from over 100 nuclear reactors on the site in above-ground storage. The license from the Nuclear Regulatory Commission, submitted in 1997, was approved in 2006. The tribe had received widespread opposition to the efforts, which were finally canceled in 2012.

A 1999 report from Private Fuel Storage calculated the impact of an explosion from the largest solid-fuel rocket motor capable of being tested at Tekoi, being "1.2 million pounds of Class 1.1 explosive". It would create a 1 psi overpressure to 4782 feet and a 0.5 psi overpressure to 7970 feet. PFS also evaluated the risk of a rocket motor escaping the test stand, which was considered improbable given the design of the facility.

== Balefill trash disposal ==
In 2003, while the nuclear storage was still under consideration, the Goshutes began a balefill trash site (landfill). It was operated by CR Group, which was a cooperation of Ace Disposal and Metro Waste. It was in full operation by 2005.

Waste Management of Utah purchased the site from Metro Waste in 2008. Waste Management disclosed an EPA violation of a missing initial capacity report and permit application in March 2008; no penalty was assessed, given the circumstances.
