= Hill Air Force Base =

United States Air Force base near Layton, Utah, United States

- Ogden, Utah in United States of America
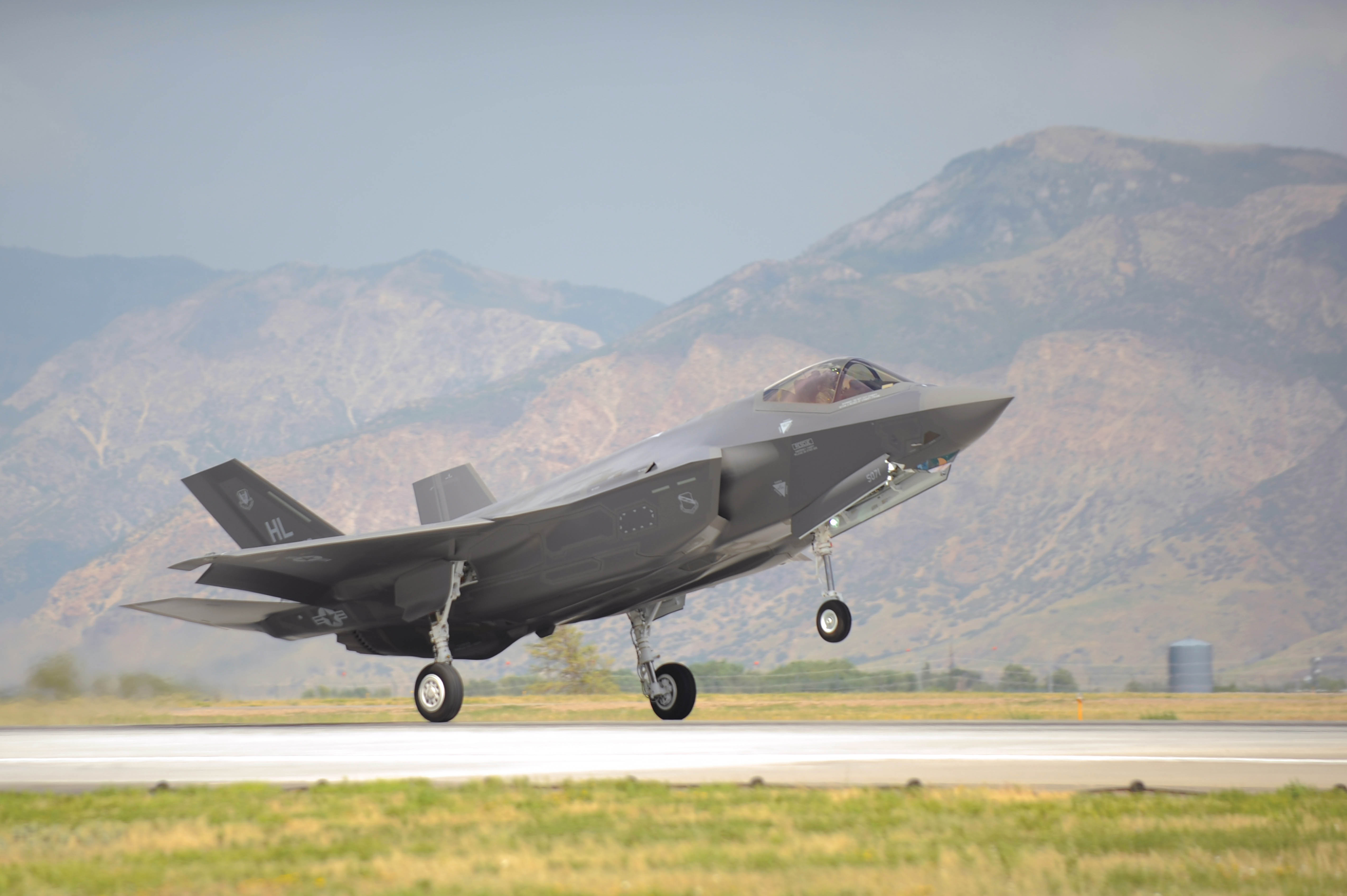
- A F-35A Lightning II of the 388th Fighter Wing touches down at Hill Air Force Base in 2015.

Site information
- Type: US Air Force Base
- Owner: Department of Defense
- Operator: US Air Force
- Controlled by: Air Force Materiel Command (AFMC)
- Condition: Operational
- Website: www.hill.af.mil

Location
- Location within North America Location within the United States Location within Utah
- Coordinates: 41°07′26″N 111°58′22″W

Site history
- Built: 1939 – 1940
- In use: 1940 – present

Garrison information
- Current commander: Colonel Daniel Cornelius
- Garrison: 75th Air Base Wing (Host); 388th Fighter Wing; 419th Fighter Wing

Airfield information
- Identifiers: IATA: HIF, ICAO: KHIF, FAA LID: HIF, WMO: 725755
- Elevation: 1,459.6 metres (4,789 ft) AMSL
Runways
Direction	Length and surface
14/32	4,114.8 metres (13,500 ft) Porous European Mix

Hill Air Force Base (IATA: HIF, ICAO: KHIF, FAA LID: HIF) is a major U.S. Air Force (USAF) base located in Davis County, Utah, just south of the city of Ogden, and bordering the Cities of Layton, Clearfield, Riverdale, Roy, and Sunset with its largest border immediately adjacent to Clearfield and Layton. It is about 30 miles (48 km) north of Salt Lake City. The base was named in honor of Major Ployer Peter Hill of the U.S. Army Air Corps, who died in 1935 test-flying NX13372, the original Model 299 prototype of the B-17 Flying Fortress bomber. As of 2018, Hill AFB is the sixth-largest employer in the state of Utah. Hill AFB is the home of the Air Force Materiel Command's (AFMC) Ogden Air Logistics Complex (OO-ALC) which is the worldwide manager for a wide range of aircraft, engines, missiles, software, avionics, and accessories components. The OO-ALC is part of the Air Force Sustainment Center.

The host unit at Hill AFB is the AFMC's 75th Air Base Wing (75 ABW), which provides services and support for the OO-ALC and its subordinate organizations. Additional tenant units at Hill AFB include operational fighter wings of Air Combat Command (ACC) and Air Force Reserve Command (AFRC).

== History ==
Hill Air Force Base is named in honor of Major Ployer Peter Hill (1894–1935), the Chief of the Flying Branch of the U.S. Army Air Corps (USAAC) Material Division of Wright Field, Dayton, Ohio. Major Hill had died as a result of injuries he received from the crash of the Boeing Aircraft Company's experimental aircraft Boeing Model 299 at Wright Field, the prototype airplane for what became the famous B-17 Flying Fortress.

Hill Air Force Base traces its origins back to the ill-fated U.S. Army's Air Mail "experiment" of 1934 when the idea originated for a permanent air depot in the Salt Lake City area. In the following years, the USAAC surveyed the region for a suitable location for the permanent western terminus of the air mail. Several sites in Utah were considered, and the present site near Ogden emerged as the clear favorite.

In July 1939, Congress allocated $8.0 million to build the Ogden Air Depot. Hill Field officially opened on 7 November 1940.

Following American entry into World War II in December 1941, Hill Field quickly became an important maintenance and supply base, with round-the-clock operations geared to supporting the war effort. Battle-worn warplanes like the A-26, B-17, B-24, B-29, P-40, P-47, P-61, were sent to Hill Field for structural repairs, engine overhauls, and spare parts. The peak wartime employment at Hill Field was reached in 1943 with just over 22,000 military and civilian personnel. Men and women at the depot rehabilitated and returned thousands of warplanes to combat.

Starting in 1944, Hill Field was utilized for the long-term storage of surplus airplanes and their support equipment, including outmoded P-40 Tomahawks and P-40 Warhawks which had been removed from combat service and replaced by newer and better warplanes. P-47 Thunderbolts, B-24 Liberators, B-29 Superfortresses, and many other types of aircraft were also prepared for and placed in storage at Hill throughout the 1940s and 1950s.

Hill Field became Hill Air Force Base on 5 February 1948, following the creation of the United States Air Force. During the Korean War, Hill AFB was assigned a major share of the Air Materiel Command's logistical effort to support the combat in Korea. Hill AFB personnel quickly removed needed warplanes from storage, renovated them, and added them to active-service USAF flying squadrons.

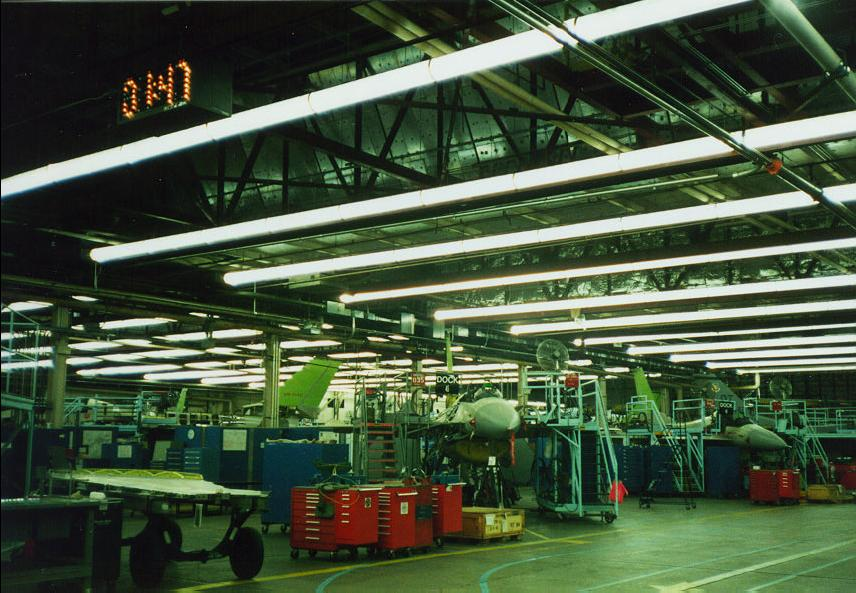
Hangar at Hill Air Force Base.

Then during the 1960s, Hill AFB began to perform maintenance support for various kinds of jet warplanes, mainly the F-4 Phantom II during the Vietnam War, and then afterward, the more modern F-16 Fighting Falcon, A-10 Thunderbolt II and C-130 Hercules, and also air combat missile systems and air-to-ground rockets. Hill AFB continues to carry out these tasks to the present day.

Renovation of Hangar 225, a historic barrel-vaulted hangar, began in late 2018.

In May 2026, Hill Air Force Base got $6.5 million in federal funding to construct a dedicated F-35 canopy maintenance facility. Secured by Rep. Blake Moore, the project focuses on improving repair capabilities for the U.S. Air Force, Navy, Marines, and international partners.

=== Major commands assigned ===
- Materiel Div, Office of Chief of the Air Corps, 1 December 1939 – 11 December 1941
- Air Service Command, 11 December 1941 – 17 July 1944
- Army Air Forces Materiel and Services, 17 July 1944 – 31 August 1944
- Army Air Forces Technical Service Command, 31 August 1944 – 1 July 1945
- Air Technical Service Command, 1 July 1945 – 9 March 1946
- Air Materiel Command, 9 March 1946 – 1 April 1961
- Air Force Logistics Command, 1 April 1961 – 1 June 1992
- Air Force Materiel Command 1 June 1992 – present

=== Base operating units ===
- Ogden Air Depot, 7 November 1940 – 8 April 1942
- 9th Station Complement, 8 April 1942 – 2 January 1943
- 482d Base HQ and Air Base Sq, 2 January 1943 – 1 April 1944
- 4135th AAF Base Unit, 1 April 1944 – 26 September 1947
- 4135th AF Base Unit, 26 September 1947 – 27 August 1948
- HQ and HQ Sq, Ogden AMA, 27 August 1948 – 4 May 1950
- 25th Air Base Gp, 4 May 1950 – 1 May 1953
- 2849th Air Base Wg, 1 May 1953 – 8 July 1964
- 2849th Air Base Gp, 8 July 1964 – 1994
- 75th Air Base Wing 1994 – present

== Role and operations ==
=== Ogden Air Logistics Complex ===
The Ogden Air Logistics Complex provides worldwide engineering and logistics management for the F-35 Lightning II, F-16 Fighting Falcon, A-10 Thunderbolt II, and Minuteman III intercontinental ballistic missile.

=== 75th Air Base Wing ===
The 75th Air Base Wing is responsible for the base operating support of all units at Hill AFB. The 75th ABW provides base operating support for the Ogden Air Logistics Complex, the 388th and 419th Fighter Wings, and 50+ mission partner units.

=== Hill Aerospace Museum ===
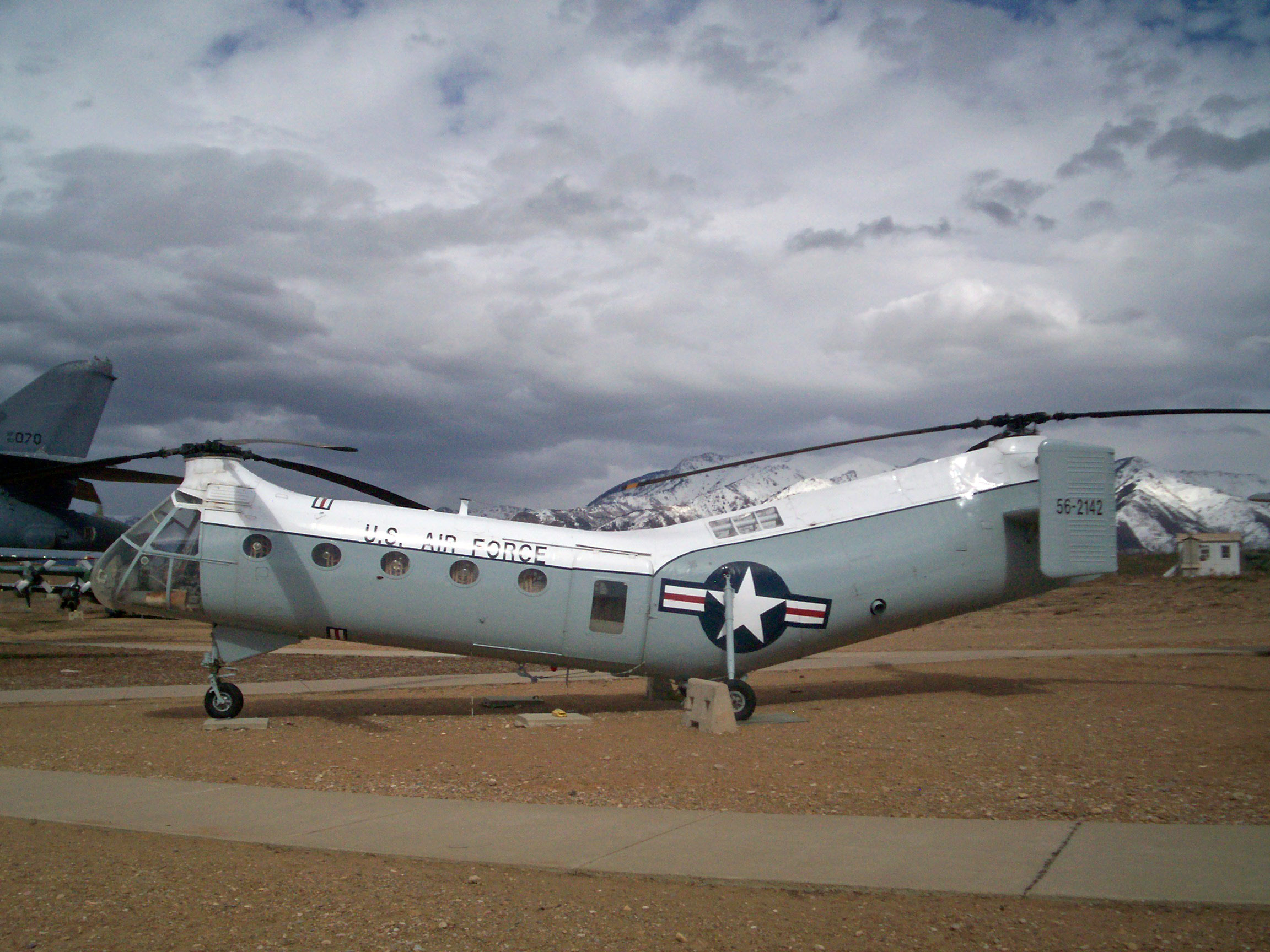
A retired USAF H-21C Shawnee tandem-rotor helicopter at the Hill Aerospace Museum.

Hill AFB has also housed the 30-acre (120,000 m^{2}) Hill Aerospace Museum since 1981. This contains more than 80 retired USAF, U.S. Army Air Forces, U.S. Navy and former Warsaw Pact fixed-wing aircraft, helicopters, and missiles.

=== Utah Test and Training Range ===
The Utah Test and Training Range is one of the only live-fire U.S. Air Force training ranges within the United States. It is located in far western Utah, close to the Nevada border, and it extends both north and south of Interstate Highway 80, with several miles of separation on each side of the Interstate Highway. The portion of the bombing range that lies north of Interstate 80 is also west of the Great Salt Lake. The Utah Test and Training Range lies in Tooele County, and the land is owned by the state of Utah, but the use of the airspace and training exercises are scheduled by Hill AFB.

On 8 September 2004, the National Aeronautics and Space Administration's Genesis space probe crash-landed on the nearby U.S. Army Dugway Proving Ground, as planned.

== Based units ==
Flying and notable non-flying units based at Hill Air Force Base.

Units marked GSU are Geographically Separate Units, which although based at Hill, are subordinate to a parent unit based at another location.

=== United States Air Force ===
Air Force Materiel Command (AFMC)

- Air Force Sustainment Center
  - 75th Air Base Wing (Host wing)
    - 75th Communications and Information Directorate
    - 75th Comptroller Squadron
    - 75th Civil Engineering Group
    - 75th Medical Group
    - 75th Mission Support Group
  - Ogden Air Logistics Complex
    - 309th Aircraft Maintenance Group
    - 309th Commodities Maintenance Group
    - 309th Electronics Maintenance Group
    - 309th Maintenance Support Group
    - 309th Missile Maintenance Group
    - 309th Software Engineering Group
  - 448th Supply Chain Management Wing
    - 748th Supply Chain Management Group (GSU)
      - 414th Supply Chain Management Squadron
      - 415th Supply Chain Management Squadron
      - 416th Supply Chain Management Squadron
      - 417th Supply Chain Management Squadron
      - 419th Supply Chain Management Squadron
- Air Force Life Cycle Management Center
  - Agile Combat Support Directorate
    - Automatic Test Systems Division (GSU)
  - Armament Directorate
    - Munitions Division (GSU)
  - Acquisition Intelligence Division
  - Battle Management Directorate
    - Aerospace Enabler Division (GSU)
  - Engineering Directorate
    - Air Force Advanced Composites Office
  - F-35 Joint Program Office
    - F-35 Program Office Operating Location (GSU)
  - Fighters/Bombers Directorate
    - A-10 Division (GSU)
    - F-16 Division (GSU)
    - F-22 Division (GSU)
  - Logistics Directorate
    - Product Data Services Division (GSU)
  - Mobility Directorate
    - Mature and Proven Aircraft Division (GSU)
- Air Force Nuclear Weapons Center
  - Ground Based Strategic Deterrent Systems Directorate (GSU)
  - Minuteman III Systems Directorate (GSU)

Air Combat Command (ACC)

- Fifteenth Air Force
  - 388th Fighter Wing
    - Headquarters Utah Test and Training Range
    - 388th Operations Group
      - 4th Fighter Squadron – F-35A Lightning II
      - 34th Fighter Squadron – F-35A Lightning II
      - 421st Fighter Squadron F-35A Lightning II
      - F-35A Demonstration Team F-35A Lightning II
      - 388th Operations Support Squadron
    - 388th Maintenance Group
      - 4th Fighter Generation Squadron
      - 34th Fighter Generation Squadron
      - 421st Fighter Generation Squadron
      - 388th Logistics Support Squadron
      - 388th Maintenance Squadron
      - 388th Munitions Squadron
  - 552nd Air Control Wing
    - 552nd Air Control Group
      - 729th Air Control Squadron (GSU)

Air Force Reserve Command (AFRC)

- 419th Fighter Wing
  - 419th Operations Group
    - 466th Fighter Squadron – F-35A Lightning II
  - 419th Maintenance Group
    - 419th Aircraft Maintenance Squadron
    - 419th Combat Logistics Support Squadron
    - 419th Maintenance Operations Flight
    - 419th Maintenance Squadron
  - 419th Mission Support Group
    - 67th Aerial Port Squadron
    - 419th Civil Engineer Squadron
    - 419th Logistics Readiness Squadron
    - 419th Mission Support Flight
    - 419th Security Forces Squadron
  - 419th Medical Squadron

== Connections to the Hi-Fi murders ==
Three enlisted United States Air Force airmen stationed at Hill AFB – Pierre Dale Selby, William Andrews and Keith Roberts – were convicted in connection with the Hi-Fi murders, which took place at the Hi-Fi Shop in Ogden, Utah, on 22 April 1974. Selby and Andrews were both sentenced to death for murder and aggravated robbery while Roberts, who had remained in a getaway vehicle, was convicted of robbery. Evidence gathered from a trashbin on base and from the perpetrators' barracks was instrumental in their convictions.

One of the survivors of the attack, Cortney Naisbitt, later trained in computers and worked at Hill Air Force Base.

== Education ==
On-post housing is zoned to the Davis School District. The military base has no schools on-site.

The zoned schools for the base are: Hill Field Elementary School, North Layton Junior High School, and Northridge High School.

== Accidents and incidents ==
- 24 August 1970 Universal Airlines Lockheed L-188C Electra N855U departed Hill Air Force Base in Ogden, Utah on an Air Force Logair flight to Mountain Home Air Force Base in Idaho. The aircraft departed without all its hydraulic systems in operation, leaving insufficient elevator authority, resulting in the aircraft nosing over into the ground. The aircraft was destroyed but the crew escaped with injuries. The investigation found fault with the captain and flight engineer for not following approved procedures and directives.
- 19 March 1972 Universal Airlines Lockheed L-188C Electra N851U was on a ferry flight from Tucson, Arizona to Hill Air Force Base in Ogden, Utah when it developed an engine overspeed issue, complicated by an inability to feather. The aircraft landed at Hill just after midnight, whereupon the engine exploded, destroying a large portion of the left wing and causing a substantial fire. The crew had minor injuries but the aircraft was a writeoff. The crew was cited in the investigation for improper procedures.
- 18 November 1979: Transamerica Airlines Lockheed L-188C Electra N859U operating Logair flight 3N18 for the US Air Force departed Hill Air Force Base en-route to Nellis Air Force Base in Las Vegas. While climbing between 12,000 and 13,000 ft, all electrical power was lost; the crew requested an immediate descent. The aircraft attained high airspeed and high rate of descent and disintegrated in flight, killing all three crew members. Probable cause was progressive failure of the electrical system leading to disabling or erratic performance of critical instruments and lighting in night-time instrument conditions. The crew became disoriented and lost control. The aircraft was inherited from Universal Airlines via Saturn Airways and was the third current or former Universal Airlines Electra to have an accident at Hill AFB.
- 9 May 1981: During an Air Show to celebrate the 40th anniversary of the base, Thunderbird Captain Nick Hauck, and 2 livestock were killed when Hauck's T-38 Talon lost power on approach to the runway. The plane cartwheeled several times before exploding. Hauck was killed on impact, while the livestock were killed by debris.
- 20 June 1998: An F-16C Falcon crashed after taking off from the runway during a routine test flight. The F-16 from the 514th Test Squadron was destroyed, pilot ejected with minor injuries.
- 19 October 2022: A Lockheed Martin F-35 Lightning II crashed off the end of runway 14. The 388th Fighter Wing has stated that the solo pilot was seen by a local hospital and released with no injuries.

== See also ==
- List of United States Air Force installations
- Utah World War II Army Airfields
