= Migratory bird rule =

The migratory bird rule, adopted by the United States Army Corps of Engineers and the Environmental Protection Agency (EPA) asserted that the Clean Water Act (CWA) covers regulation of isolated waters "which are or would be used as habitat by... migratory birds that cross state lines." The rule was overturned by the Supreme Court in 2001.

== Background ==
The Clean Water Act defines the waters of the United States as

1. All waters which are currently used, or were used in the past, or may be susceptible to use in interstate or foreign commerce, including all waters which are subject to the ebb and flow of the tide (navigable waters);
2. All interstate waters, including interstate wetlands;
3. All other waters, such as intrastate lakes, rivers, and streams (including intermittent streams), mudflats, sandflats, wetlands, sloughs, prairie potholes, wet meadows, playa lakes, or natural ponds, the use, degradation, or destruction of which could affect interstate or foreign commerce, including any such waters:
  1. Which are or could be used by interstate or foreign travelers for recreational or other purposes; or
  2. From which fish or shell fish are or could be taken and sold in interstate or foreign commerce; or
  3. Which are used or could be used for industrial purposes by industries in interstate commerce.
4. All impoundments of waters otherwise defined as waters of the United States under the definition;
5. Tributaries of waters identified in paragraphs a (1)-(4) of this section;
6. The territorial seas;
7. Wetlands adjacent to waters identified in paragraphs (1)-(6).

Based on paragraph 3, above, the Migratory Bird Rule (51 FR 41217) asserted in 1986 that the power of the Federal Government, under the Clean Water Act, could be extended to isolated, intrastate, non-navigable waters based on the following factors being present:

1. Use of the water as habitat by birds protected by the Migratory Bird Treaty Act;
2. Use of the water as habitat for Federally protected endangered or threatened species; or
3. Use of the water to irrigate crops sold in interstate commerce.

== Overturning the rule ==
On January 9, 2001, the US Supreme Court in Solid Waste Agency of Northern Cook Cty. v. Army Corps of Engineers threw out the "Migratory Bird Rule," A case that pitted a consortium of towns around Chicago, Illinois over isolated wetlands, inhabited or visited by over 100 migratory bird species, against the US Army Corps of Engineers. In this case, Skokie, Illinois wanted abandoned quarries filled with water, but not connected to another or navigable body of water to serve as a site for a solid waste facility. For the previous 15 years lower courts had sustained the rule in favor of migratory birds, siding with the Army Corps.

The Supreme Court held that neither the Corps nor the EPA can exert CWA jurisdiction over isolated, intrastate, non-navigable waters, where the sole basis for asserting CWA jurisdiction rests on the three factors listed under the Migratory Bird Rule, above.

At least one state reacted to the new Supreme Court ruling by restoring isolated wetlands protection: the 2001 Wisconsin Act 6 is the first of its kind nationwide to restore wetlands regulation to the state after federal authority had been revoked. It restores protection to over 1 million acres (4,000 km^{2}) of isolated wetlands in Wisconsin. On May 7, 2001, Wisconsin Governor Scott McCallum signed a bill protecting wetlands by placing Wisconsin wetlands regulation under the jurisdiction of the Wisconsin Department of Natural Resources.
