= 388th Fighter Wing =

US Air Force unit assigned to the Air Combat Command

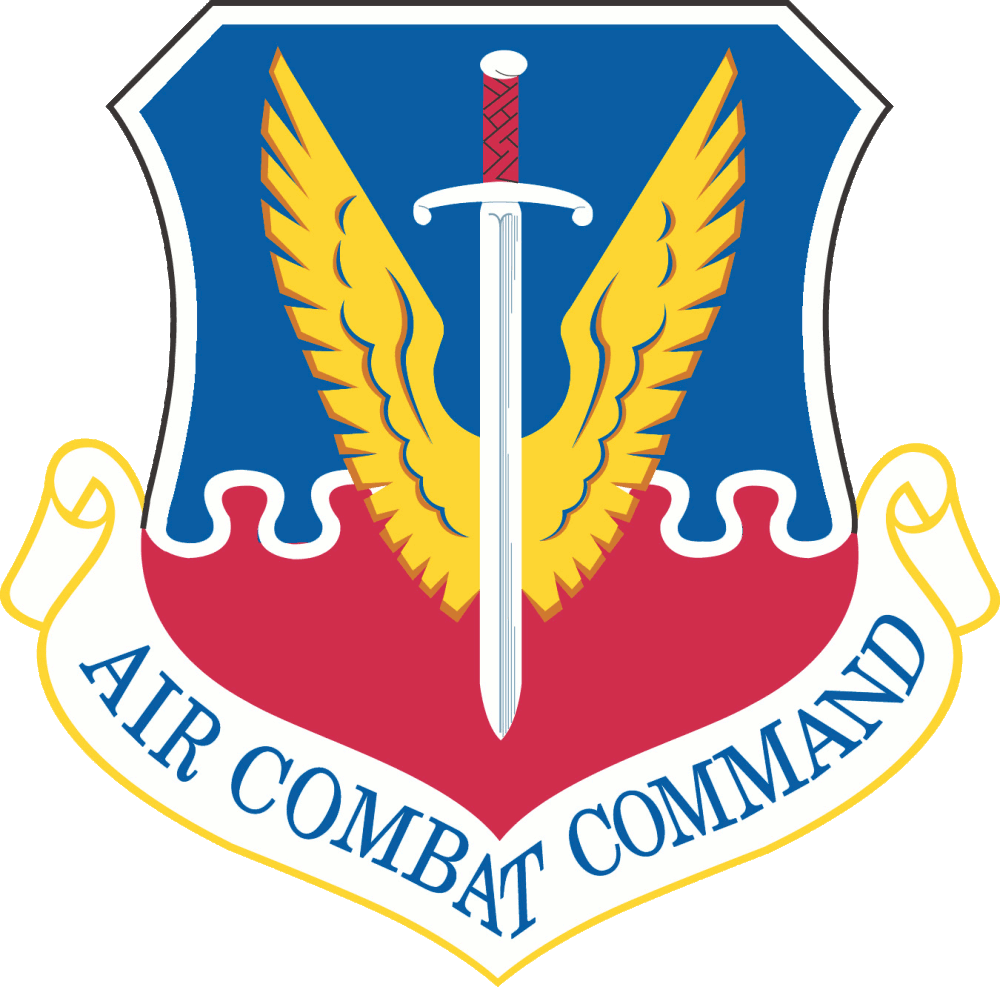
388th Fighter Wing

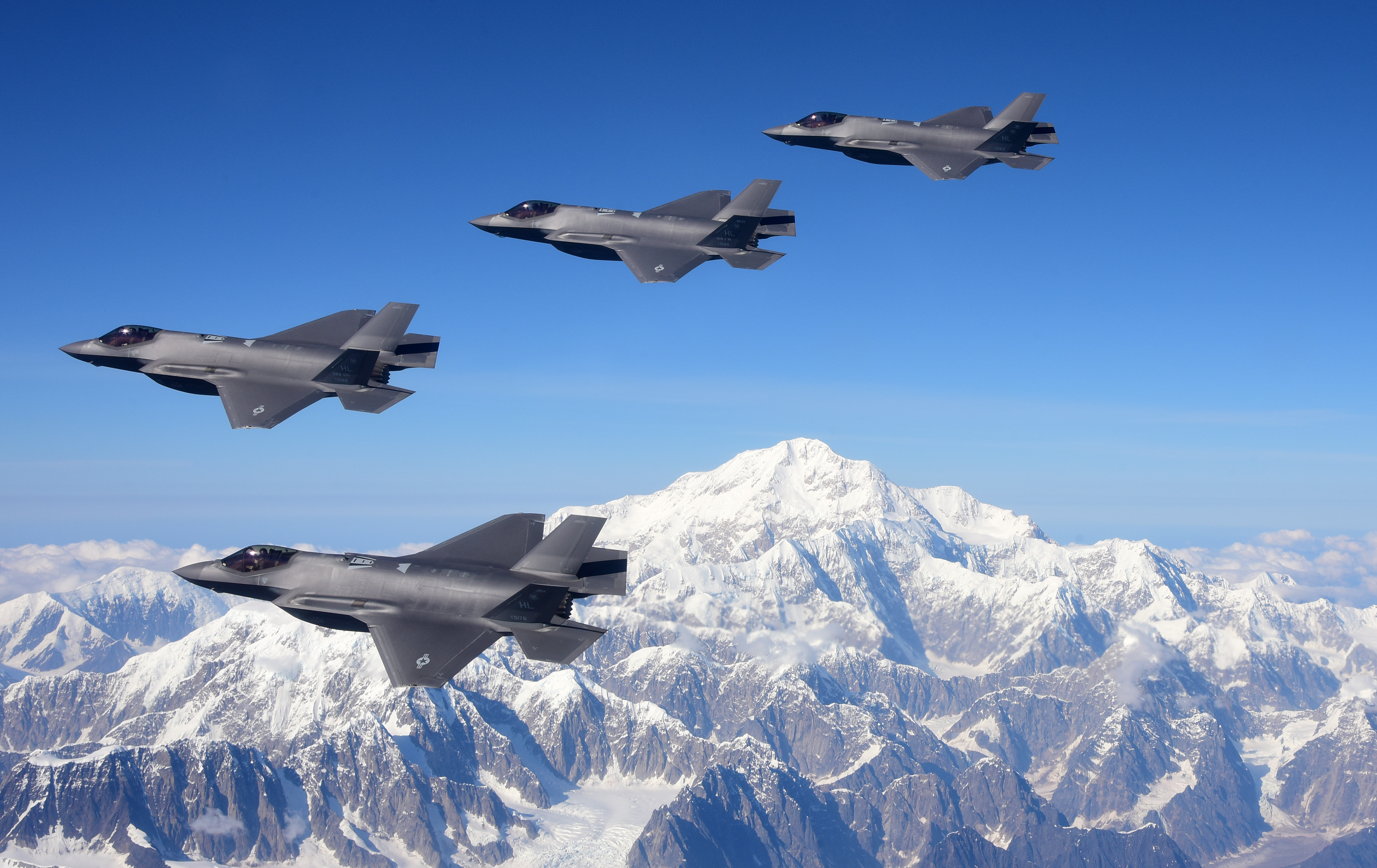
- F-35s of the 388th Fighter Wing
- Active: 1953–1957; 1962–1964; 1966—present
- Country: United States
- Branch: United States Air Force
- Role: Fighter
- Size: 2,700
- Part of: Air Combat Command
- Garrison/HQ: Hill Air Force Base
- Motto: Libertas Vel Mors (Latin for 'Freedom or Death')
- Engagements: European Theater of Operations; Vietnam War; Operation Desert Shield
- Decorations: Distinguished Unit Citation; Air Force Outstanding Unit Award with V Device; Republic of Vietnam Gallantry Cross with Palm
- Website: https://www.388fw.acc.af.mil/

Commanders
- Current commander: Col Charles A. Fallon
- Vice Commander: Col Thomas E. Hayes
- Command Chief: CCM Joshua A. VanDerBeck

Insignia
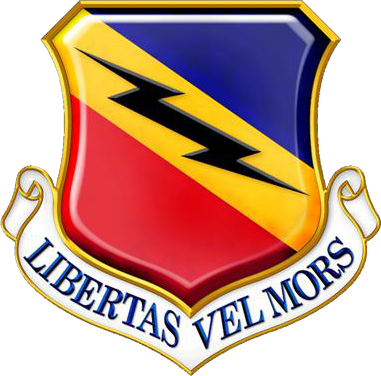
- 388th Fighter Wing emblem (Note: Approved 11 March 1955.)

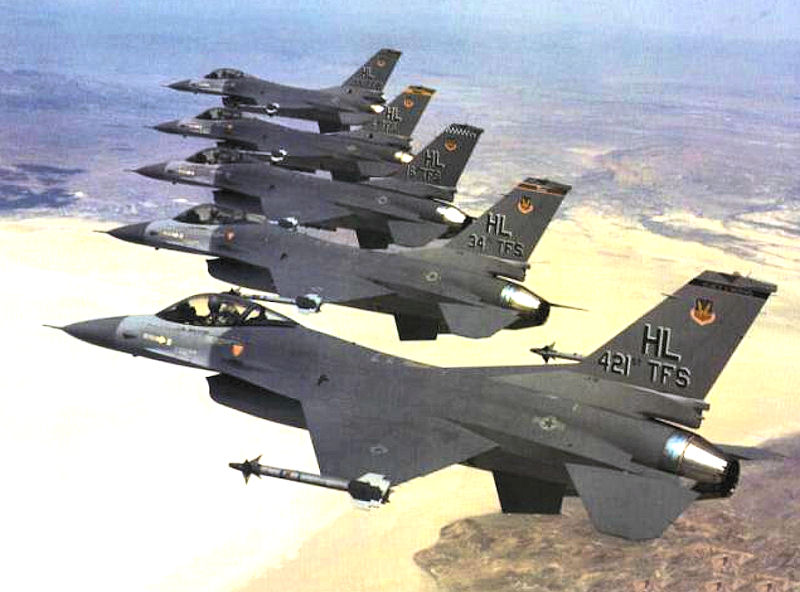
F-16 Fighting Falcons of the 388th Fighter Wing

The 388th Fighter Wing is a United States Air Force unit assigned to the Air Combat Command Fifteenth Air Force. The unit is stationed at Hill Air Force Base, Utah.

== Units ==
388th Operations Group

- 4th Fighter Squadron (4 FS)

The squadron is the second unit at Hill to transition to the Lockheed Martin F-35 Lightning II after retiring the F-16 in May 2016. It prepares to deploy worldwide to conduct air-to-air and air-to-ground operations for daylight and nighttime missions.

- 421st Fighter Squadron (421 FS)

The squadron conducts flying operations to maintain combat readiness of a 24-aircraft F-16CG squadron. It prepares to deploy worldwide to conduct Day/Night air superiority and precision strike sorties employing laser-guided and inertially aided munitions during contingencies and combat.

- 34th Fighter Squadron

This squadron is the first operational F-35A Lightning II fighter squadron in the world. It was declared combat-ready on 2 August 2016 after transitioning from the F-16 Fighting Falcon in September of the previous year.

- 388th Range Squadron (388 RANS)

The squadron is responsible for weapons and tactics development, operational planning, flying training guidance, intelligence, flight scheduling, mobility, life support activities, and people management for the operations group. The OSS provides combat-related staff support for the entire wing.

- F-35A Demonstration Team

Team flies the USAF's F-35A fighter jet at airshows performing air maneuvers that demonstrate the supermaneuverability of the F-35A. Examples of these demonstrations include the minimum radius turn to high alpha loop, weapons bay door pass, pedal turn, slow speed to power climb and tactical pitch.

- 388th Operations Support Squadron (388 OSS)

The squadron is responsible for weapons and tactics development, operational planning, flying training guidance, intelligence, flight scheduling, mobility, life support activities, and people management for the operations group. The OSS provides combat-related staff support for the entire wing. It comprises the following flights: Intelligence; Aircrew Flight Equipment; Current Operations; and Weapons & Tactics.

388th Maintenance Group (388 MXG)

The group comprises different support facets as squadrons and flights. The Munition Maintenance Squadron has many flights, but is primarily responsible for munitions storage, maintenance and delivery. The Munitions Loading Squadron takes responsibility for attaching the delivered munitions to the various aircraft.

== History ==
On 23 November 1953, the 388th Fighter-Bomber Wing was activated as part of Tactical Air Command (TAC). The wing was reactivated following Secretary of State John Foster Dulles' promise to provide NATO with four additional tactical fighter wings to increase its defenses against the Soviet Union due to the outbreak of the Cold War. The 388th Fighter-Interceptor Wing activated as the 388th Fighter-Bomber Group (later renamed 388th Operations Group) and became the wing's primary combat element. The group's squadrons were equipped with North American F-86F Sabres, and training commenced for operational proficiency.

Once training levels for pilots and aircrews had reached operational levels, the 50th began preparations for its move to France. On 12 December 1954, the 388th arrived at its new home, the newly constructed Étain-Rouvres Air Base.

=== United States Air Forces in Europe ===
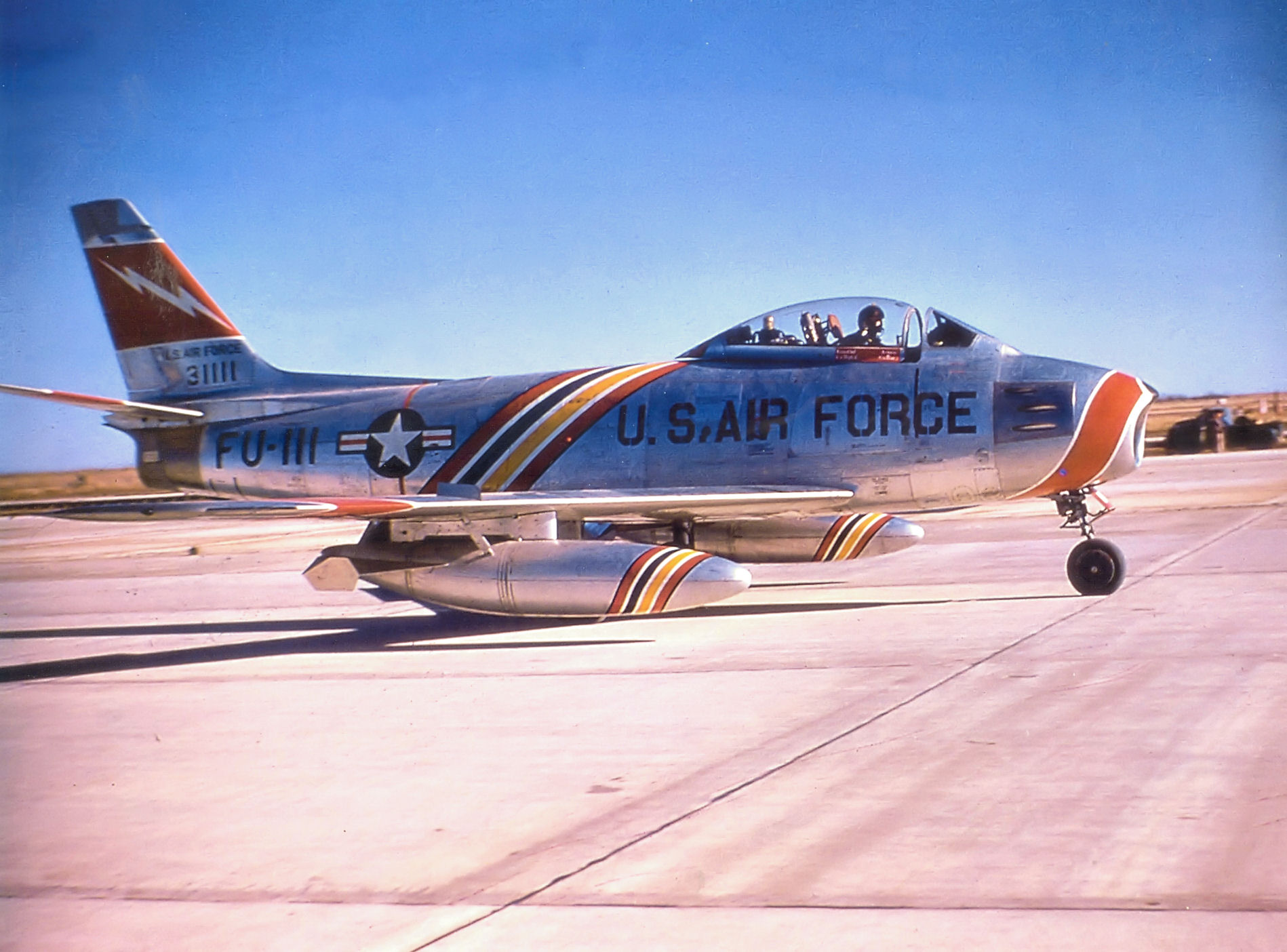
563d Squadron F-86F (Note: Aircraft is North American F-86F Sabre, serial 53-1111, about 1955. Note Wing Commander's markings on aircraft.)

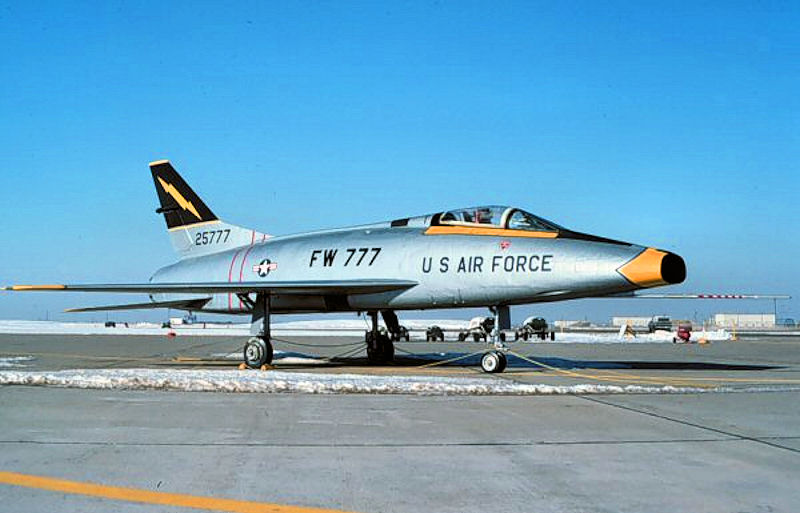
561st Squadron F-100A Super Sabre (Note: Aircraft is North American F-100A Super Sabre, serial 52-5777, at Etain AB, 1957. Aircraft was noted in 1990 at Hill AFB Museum, Utah.)

Upon arrival in France in December 1954, the 388th FBW flying elements consisted of the 561st, 562d, and 563d FB Squadrons, each equipped with 26 North American F-86F Sabres. Wing support aircraft consisted of 4 Douglas C-47 Skytrains of various types, one De Havilland Canada L-20 Beaver, and 5 Lockheed T-33 T Birds.

The wing's mission was to train for and conduct tactical nuclear weapons delivery. Its secondary mission was to conduct non-atomic tactical air operations. Upon arrival of 388th Wing Headquarters at Etain, the construction delays and other problems seriously hampered the ability of the Wing to use the base for its flying operations. The 562nd Fighter Bomber Squadron was forced to operate from Spangdahlem Air Base, the 563rd from Bitburg Air Base and the 561st from Hahn Air Base in West Germany for the winter of 1954–55.

In April and May 1955, rotational deployments to Wheelus Air Base, Libya began for their first gunnery and bombing training since their arrival in Europe. In the fall, with enough facilities construction completed, the three flying squadrons were transferred from Germany and took up their home assignment at Étain. In August 1955, First Lt. Philip Ortego was assigned to the 561st Fighter Bomber Squadron as its Intelligence Officer.

On 22 November 1955, Detachment 1, 388th Fighter-Bomber Group was activated at Hahn Air Base to stand nuclear alert with the Wing's F-86s. Personnel and aircraft primarily came from the 561st Squadron. In February 1956 the detachment was transferred to more spacious facilities at Spangdahlem Air Base. Rotational deployments of 8 F-86's and support personnel to Germany continued until the fall of 1957 when the 388th was inactivated.

In the fall of 1956 the 388th began planning for conversion to the North American F-100D Super Sabre Due to the adverse flying conditions at Etain for conversion training, the new aircraft were deployed to Nouasseur Air Base in Morocco, with the squadrons deploying their F-86s to Nouasseur, then returning to France or Spangdahlem in their new F-100s for Zulu Alert duties.

During this transition period, the 388th experienced a significant personnel crisis, with many of its officers and noncomissioned officers completing their two-year unaccompanied tour in France. The personnel problem became worse in the fall of 1957 with many single airmen completing their three years of overseas service and were rotating back to the United States.

The manning issues of the 388th, which has fallen to about 65 percent of authorized strength, along with budget shortfalls led HQ USAFE to inactivate the unit instead of transfer it. On 8 December 1957 HQ USAFE inactivated the 388th, with its and assets being transferred to the 49th Fighter-Bomber Wing, which had been moved from Misawa Air Base, Japan without personnel or equipment.

=== McConnell Air Force Base ===
In October 1962, the 388th Tactical Fighter Wing was reactivated under TAC. The wing was reorganized at McConnell Air Force Base, Kansas, under the Twelfth Air Force, as a tenant unit under the 4347th Combat Training Wing.

Under TAC, the 388th did not have a fighter group, and the four tactical tighter squadrons (560th, 561st, 562d, 563d) were assigned directly to wing headquarters. The reactivated wing initially flew the North American F-100C Super Sabre, but was replaced in 1963 by the Republic F-105D Thunderchief. On 4 July 1963, it became responsible for the base as the host unit.

The demands of the Vietnam War and escalation of United States involvement in the conflict led TAC to deploy the 388th to Southeast Asia for combat duty. New bases were being established in Thailand, and a permanent organizational structure was needed to accommodate the semi-permanent presence of USAF units at the forward bases. On 8 April 1966, the 388th was relieved of its assignment to TAC and was transferred to Pacific Air Forces. The wing was ordered to Korat Royal Thai Air Force Base, Thailand, where its F-105 squadrons had been on temporary rotational deployments for the past two years.

=== Pacific Air Forces ===
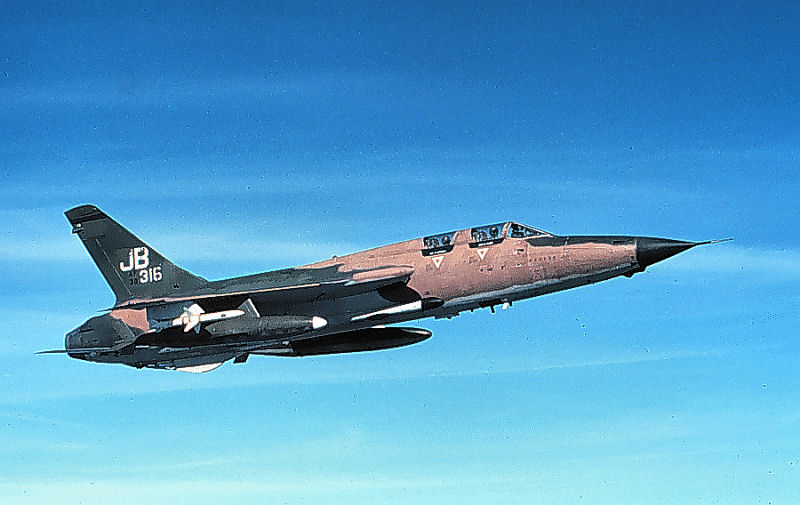
17th Wild Weasel Squadron F-105G (Note: Aircraft is Republic F-105G Thunderchief, serial 63-8316.)

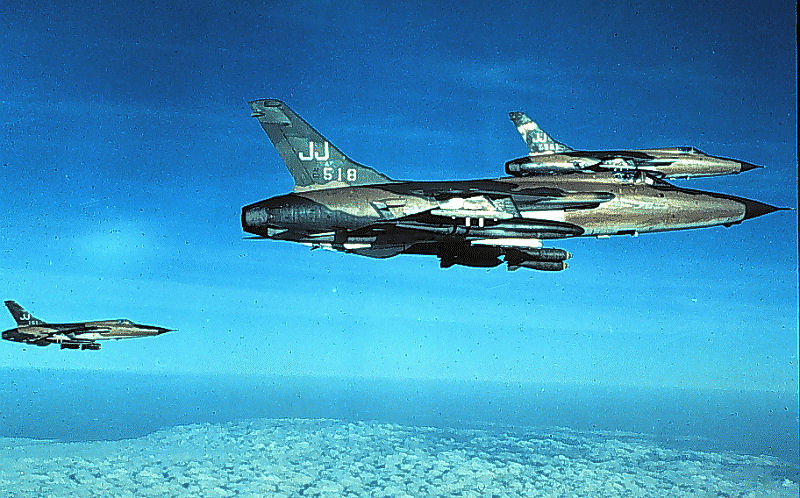
34th Tactical Fighter Squadron F-105D (Note: Aircraft is Republic F-105D Thunderchief, serial 60-0518.)

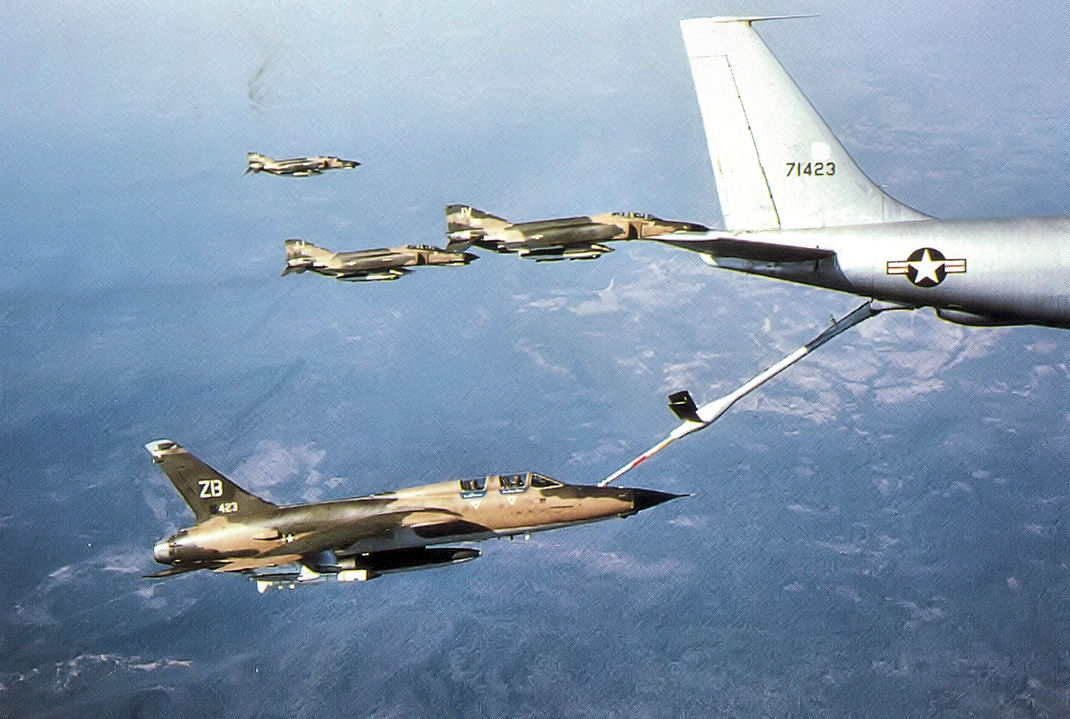
388th F-105 Wild Weasels and F-4 Phantoms refuel with a KC-135 on a mission to North Vietnam, 1970

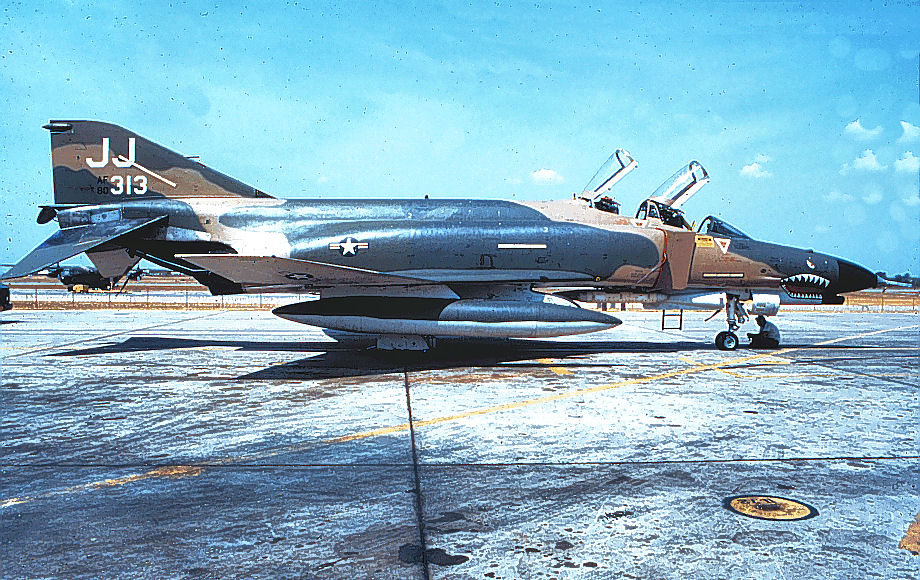
34th Tactical Fighter Squadron F-4E Phantom II (Note: Aircraft os McDonnell F-4E Phantom II, serial 68-0313.)

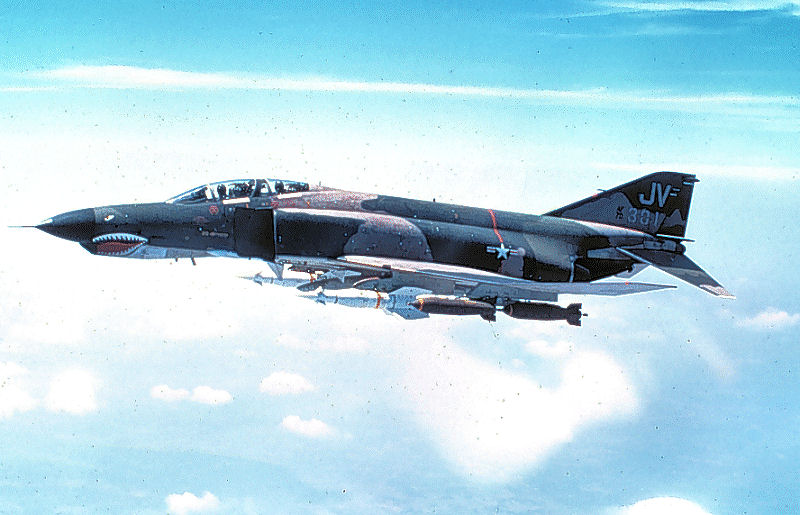
469th Tactical Fighter Squadron F-4E Phantom (Note: Aircraft is McDonnell F-4E Phantom II, serial 66-0301.)

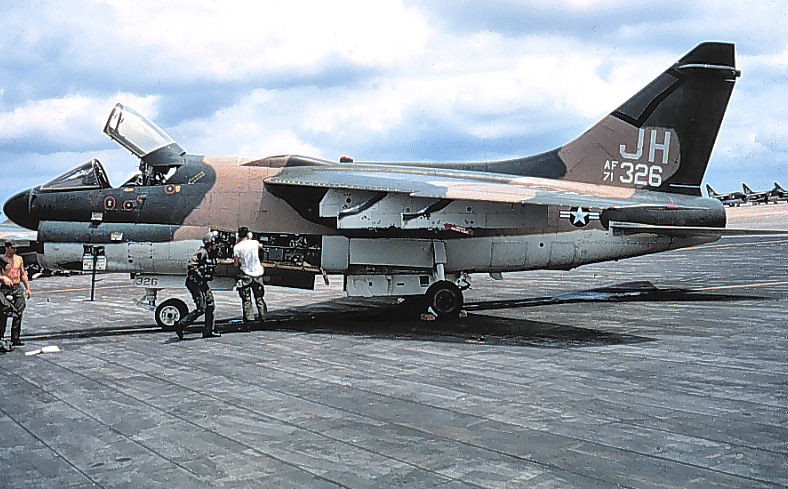
3d Tactical Fighter Squadron A-7D Corsair II (Note: Aircraft is Ling-Temco-Vought A-7D-10-CV Corsair II, serial 71-0326 at Korat RTAFB, 1974.)

In April 1966 the 388th was sent to Korat Royal Thai Air Force Base, Thailand where it replaced the 6234th Tactical Fighter Wing and assumed host wing responsibilities at Korat. The mission of the wing was to engage in combat operations over Indochina, conducting interdiction, direct air support, armed reconnaissance, and fighter escort missions.

During the Vietnam War, numerous units were deployed to and stationed at Korat RTAFB and engaged in combat operations. As part of the rapid buildup of United States forces in Thailand in the mid-1960s, the 388th was the umbrella organization to as many as 34 operating units and about 6,500 USAF airmen. The wing also supported components of the Royal Thai Air Force, and a complement of Royal New Zealand Air Force (RNZAF) Bristol Freighters.

The squadrons assigned to the 388th at Korat were:

- 3rd Tactical Fighter Squadron (Tail Code: JH)

A-7D Corsair II, March 1973 – December 1975

- 7th Airborne Command and Control Squadron (Tail Code: JC)

EC-130E Hercules, April 1972 – May 1974

- 6010th Wild Weasel Squadron: 1 November 1970 (Tail Code: JB)

Replaced by the: 17th Wild Weasel Squadron: 1 December 1971 – 15 November 1974
F-105G Thunderchief, November 1970 – December 1974

- 34th Tactical Fighter Squadron (Tail Code: JJ)

F-105D/F Thunderchief, May 1966 – May 1969
F-4E Phantom II, May 1969 – October 1974
F-4D Phantom II, October 1974 – December 1975

- 42d Tactical Electronic Warfare Squadron (Tail Code: JV)

EB-66C/E Destroyer, September 1970 – January 1974

- 44th Tactical Fighter Squadron (Tail Code: JE)

F-105D/F Thunderchief, April 1967 – November 1970
F-4E Phantom II, December 1970 – December 1975

- 469th Tactical Fighter Squadron (Tail Code: JV)

F-105D/F Thunderchief, August 1966 – November 1969
F-4E Phantom II, November 1969 – October 1972

- 553d Reconnaissance Squadron (no tail code)

EC-121R Constellation, December 1970 – December 1971

- Detachment 1, 561st Tactical Fighter Squadron (Tail Code: WW)

F-105G Thunderchief, February 1973 – September 1973

In mid-1968 it was decided to make the 388th an F-4 Wing, and also to equip the 388th with the new F-4E and the F-105s would be transferred to the 355th Tactical Fighter Wing at Takhli Royal Thai Air Force Base. The main difference with the F-4E model was the addition of an internal M61 cannon. The F-4C and D models previously in use had shown some serious drawbacks in the initial air-to-air battles over Vietnam. The earlier AIM-7 Sparrow, AIM-4 Falcon, and AIM-9 Sidewinder air-to-air missiles did not perform up to expectations. They were expensive, unreliable, and vulnerable to countermeasures. The Phantoms could carry a podded cannon mounted on the centerline, but it was relatively inaccurate, caused excessive drag which reduced the performance of the Phantom carrying it, and took up a valuable ordnance/fuel station.

On 17 November 1968, an F-4E Phantom squadron from Eglin Air Force Base, Florida, replaced the single-seat F-105E Thunderchiefs of the 469th. The new Phantom squadron, the first E-models in Thailand, retained the designation 469th Tactical Fighter Squadron.

In January 1969, the wing sought a new assignment. Proliferating antiaircraft defenses in the Barrel Roll area in the Kingdom of Laos were making operations ever riskier for Slow Forward Air Controllers (FAC) such as the Raven FACs. Volunteers from the 469th Tactical Fighter Squadron were approved for Fast FAC duty under the call sign "Tiger" in February. On 18 March, the volunteer FACs began flying a single daily sortie. By July, they were so immersed in directing close air support, they were allotted four sorties per day. They supplied the necessary tactical air power for General Vang Pao's Hmong guerrillas to sweep through Operation Raindance. Among the benefits of strike and FAC units being co-located was the Hunter-Killer Team concept fostered by "Tiger" FACs. Strike aircraft could be directed by FACs, or the flight leader could take over the air strike after being led to the target.

On 10 May 1969, the 34th Tactical Fighter Squadron was reassigned to the 347th Tactical Fighter Wing at Yokota Air Base, Japan, but it remained attached to the 388th at Korat. It was re-equipped with F-4Es on 5 July. On 15 May 1969, the F-105-equipped 44th Tactical Fighter Squadron was reassigned to the 355th Wing .

On 12 June 1972, the 35th Tactical Fighter Squadron, flying F-4Ds, was deployed from the 3rd Tactical Fighter Wing at Kunsan Air Base, South Korea, in ann Operation Constant Guardredeployment to support operations over North Vietnam during Linebacker. They remained until 10 October 1972 when they returned to Korea.

On 29 September 1972, the 354th Tactical Fighter Wing, based at Myrtle Beach Air Force Base South Carolina, deployed 72 A-7D Corsair II of the 355th, 353rd and 354th Tactical Fighter Squadrons and the 356th Tactical Fighter Squadron to Korat for a 179-day tmporary duty (TDY). By mid-October, 1,574 airmen from Myrtle Beach had arrived. In March 1973 A-7D aircraft were drawn from the deployed 354th squadrons and assigned to the 388th as the 3d Tactical Fighter Squadron (Tail Code: JH). Some TDY personnel from the 354th were assigned to the 388th and placed on permanent party status.

In April 1972 Detachment 1, 561st Tactical Fighter Squadron deployed from McConnell Air Force Base to Korat flying specially equipped F-105Gs. With the end of combat in August, the squadron returned to 35th TFW at George on 5 September.

After the end of combat operations in August 1973, the 388th entered into intensive training program to maintain combat readiness and continued to fly electronic surveillance and intelligence missions. Also, it was announced by the United States and Thailand that of the 43,000 Americans and 500 aircraft stationed in Thailand, about 3,500 men and 100 aircraft would be withdrawn. The 388th entered into intensive training program to maintain combat readiness and continued to fly electronic surveillance and intelligence missions. The 388th provided air cover and escort during the evacuation of Americans from Phnom Penh, Cambodia, and of Americans and selected Vietnamese from Saigon, South Vietnam, in April 1975. It also participated in the rescue of the crew and recovery of the SS Mayaguez, an American-flagged contained ship seized by Khmer Rouge forces, in May 1975.

At the end of 1975, there were only three combat squadrons at Korat, consisting of 24 F-4D's of the 34th, 24 A-7D's of the 3rd, and 6 AC-130 Spectre aircraft of the 16th Special Operations Squadron. On 23 December 1975, the 388th and its remaining squadron, inactivated at Korat RTAFB, closing out the USAF operations at the base.

For these operations and its wartime service at Korat Royal Thai Air Force Base (1966–1975), the wing earned a total of eight Air Force Outstanding Unit Awards and a Presidential Unit Citation.

=== Tactical Air Command ===
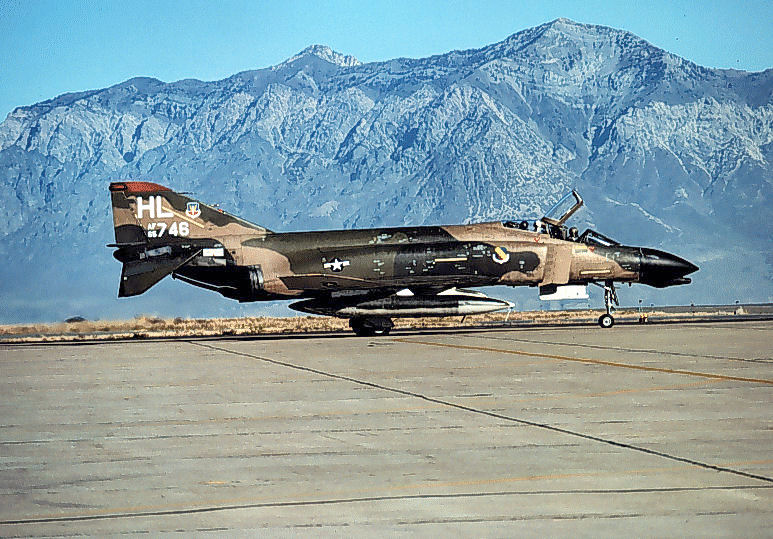
McDonnell F-4D Phantom II (Note: Aircraft is McDonnell F-4D-28-MC Phantom II, serial 65-0746, at Hill AFB, 1978. It was sent to AMARC as FP0106 on 26 April 1988.)

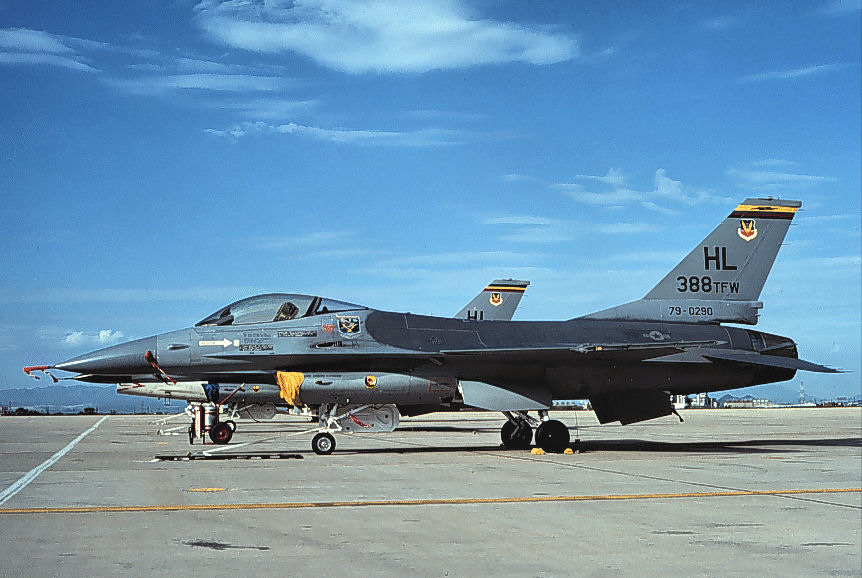
F-16A Fighting Falcon (Note: Aircraft is General Dynamics F-16A Block 10 Fighting Falcon, serial 79-0290, 1980. It is now on display at Montana Air National Guard, Great Falls International Airport, Montana.)

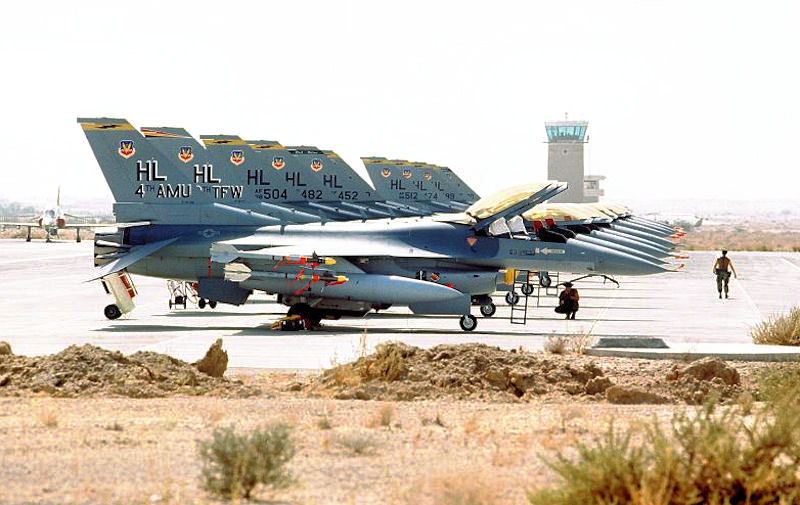
F-16Cs of the 388th TFW line an airfield in Southwest Asia during Operation Desert Storm on 23 January 1991.

The 388th ceased all aircraft operations at Korat Thailand in November 1975 and moved in without personnel or equipment in December 1975 to Hill Air Force Base, Utah, replacing a holding unit — Detachment 1, 67th Combat Support Group. In January 1976, the wing began participation in training missions and numerous exercises in a variety of offensive tactical situations flying F-4D Phantom II tactical fighters.

The wing started its conversion to the General Dynamics F-16A Fighting Falcon on 23 January 1979, becoming the USAF first fully operational F-16 fighter wing. During initial stages of conversion the wing trained F-16 instructor pilots and provided replacement training for new F-16 pilots. Thereafter the 388th trained for war readiness at U.S. and NATO locations.

In March 1981, the wing conducted its first overseas deployment to Flesland Air Station, Norway. It won the USAF Worldwide Gunsmoke Fighter Gunnery Meet in 1987. In May 1989, the first F-16C Block 40 aircraft arrived at Hill. The new model F-16, designed to accommodate the Low Altitude Navigation and Targeting Infrared for Night (LANTIRN) pod, allowed targeting and bombing in adverse operational conditions.

The 388th was the first unit to fly the F-16 into conflict with the LANTIRN system over the skies of Iraq and Kuwait during Operations Desert Shield/Desert Storm. A number of wing aircraft initially deployed to Spain as attrition reserves from January–December 1991, with two squadrons to Southwest Asia for combat operations from 28 August 1990 – 27 March 1991. After the March 1991 cease-fire, it remained in Southwest Asia to protect Coalition assets and ensure that Iraq complied with treaty terms beginning in December 1991. The 388th FW continued to employ the LANTIRN-equipped aircraft in Operations Desert Calm, Desert Fox, and Northern and Southern Watch.

=== Twenty-first century ===
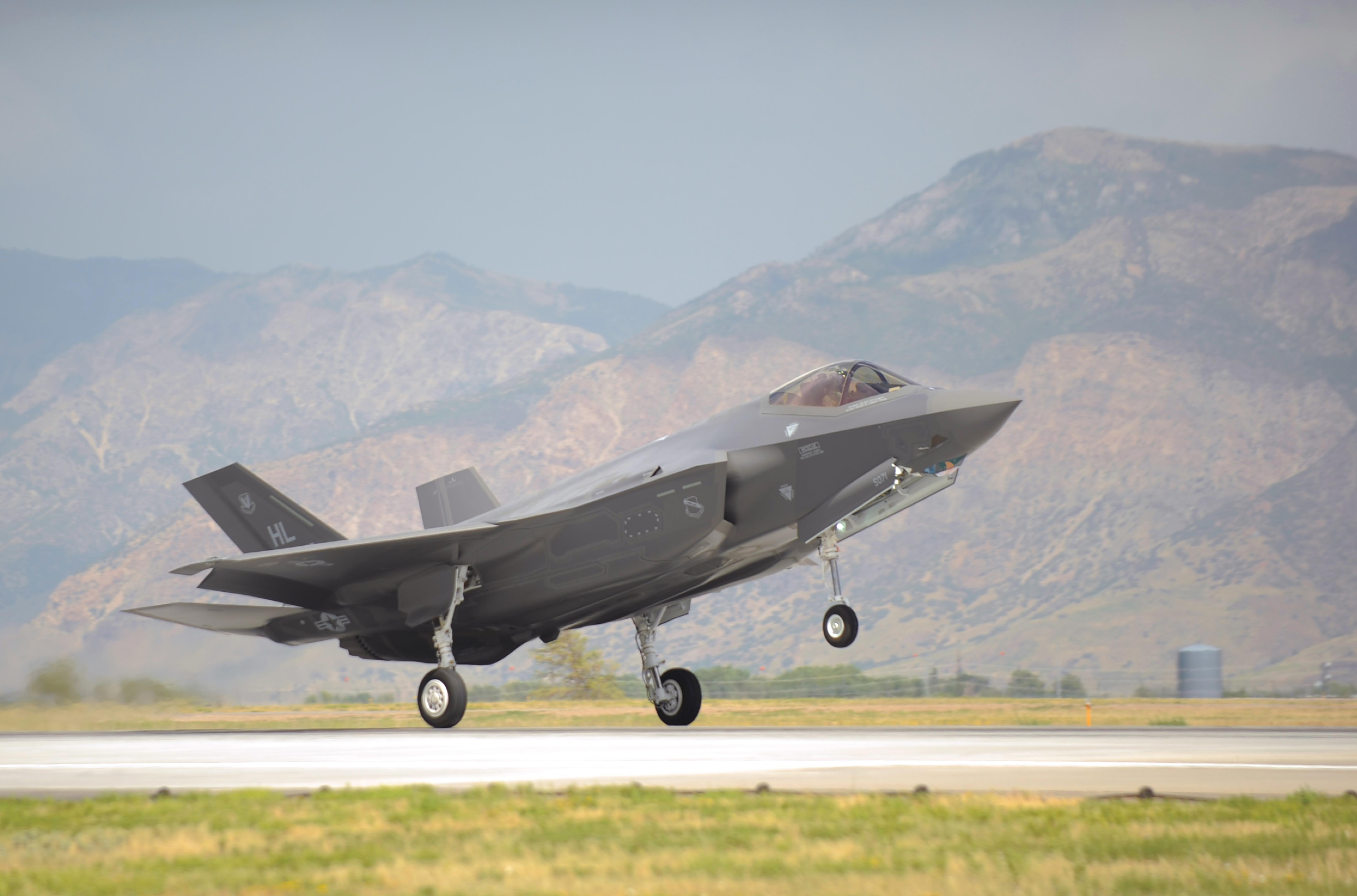
The first 388th Fighter Wing F-35A Lightning II touches down at Hill AFB

Since the September 11 terrorist attacks in 2001, the 4th, 34th, and 421st Fighter Squadrons and the 729th Air Control Squadron have actively engaged in the War in Afghanistan (2001–2021), Iraqi Freedom and the home defence Operation Noble Eagle, defending the nation at home and abroad. The wing continued to develop its role of Forward Air Control-Airborne. Assorted support personnel were deployed en masse or individually from within each unit of the 388 FW.

The 388th maintained its operational readiness into the 21st century by regularly deploying its personnel on a continuous loop of AEF deployments, while taking on new roles with Forward Air Control – Airborne.

The 388th Range Squadron, coupled with the Utah Test and Training Range, has continued to provide test and training opportunities to the world's F-16 fleet through many local and off-base exercises, to include Air Warrior, Amalgam Thunder, Combat Archer, Cope Thunder, Exercise Iron Falcon, Maple Flag, Exercise Red Flag, and support for the Fighter Weapon Instructor Course and Tactical air control party (TACP).

On 22 June 2009 a single-seat F-16 from the wing's 421st Fighter Squadron on a training mission crashed in the Utah Test and Training Range. The pilot, Captain George Bryan Houghton, 28, was killed.

On 2 September 2015, the first two Lockheed Martin F-35A Lightning II aircraft arrived at Hill AFB to begin the transition to the aircraft that is scheduled to finish in 2019.

== Lineage ==
- Established as the 388th Fighter-Day Wing on 23 March 1953

Redesignated 388th Fighter-Bomber Wing on 5 November 1953
Activated on 23 November 1953
Inactivated on 10 December 1957

- Redesignated 388th Tactical Fighter Wing and activated on 1 May 1962

Organized on 1 October 1962
Discontinued and inactivated on 8 February 1964

- Activated on 14 March 1966

Organized on 8 April 1966
Redesignated 388th Fighter Wing on 1 October 1991

=== Assignments ===
- Ninth Air Force, 23 November 1953
- Twelfth Air Force, 12 December 1954 – 10 December 1957
- Tactical Air Command, 1 May 1962
- Twelfth Air Force, 1 October 1962 – 8 February 1964
- Pacific Air Forces, 14 March 1966
- Thirteenth Air Force, 8 April 1966 (attached to Seventh Air Force, until 14 February 1973, US Support Activities Group, Seventh Air Force until c. 30 June 1975)
- 17th Air Division, 1 July 1975
- Twelfth Air Force, 23 December 1975–August 2020
- Fifteenth Air Force, 20 August 2020-onwards

=== Components ===
Groups

- 388th Fighter-Bomber Group (later 388th Operation) Group): 23 November 1953 – 10 December 1957; 1 December 1991–present.

Assigned Squadrons

- 3d Tactical Fighter Squadron: 15 March 1973 – 15 December 1975
- 4th Tactical Fighter Squadron (later 4th Fighter Squadron): 23 December 1975 – 1 December 1991 (detached 28 August 1990 – 27 March 1991)
- 7th Airborne Command and Control Squadron: 30 April 1972 – 22 May 1974
- 16th Tactical Fighter Training (later, 16th Tactical Fighter) Squadron: 1 January 1979 – 30 June 1986
- 34th Tactical Fighter Squadron (later 34th Fighter Squadron): attached 15 May 1966 – 14 March 1971, assigned 15 March 1971 – 1 December 1991
- 42d Tactical Electronic Warfare Squadron: attached c. 21 September – 14 October 1970, assigned 15 October 1970 – 15 March 1974
- 44th Tactical Fighter Squadron: 25 April 1967 – 15 October 1969 (detached 10–15 October 1969)
- 421st Tactical Fighter Squadron (later 421st Fighter Squadron): 8 April 1966 – 25 April 1967; 23 December 1975 – 1 December 1991 (detached 9–23 August 1977 and 28 August 1990 – 27 March 1991)
- 469th Tactical Fighter Squadron: 8 April 1966 – 31 October 1972
- 553d Reconnaissance Squadron: 15 December 1970 – 31 December 1971
- 560th Tactical Fighter Squadron: 1 October 1962 – 8 February 1964
- 561st Fighter-Bomber Squadron (later 561st Tactical Fighter Squadron): attached 1 July – 10 December 1957; assigned 1 October 1962 – 8 February 1964
- 562d Fighter-Bomber Squadron (later 562d Tactical Fighter Squadron): attached 1 July – 10 December 1957; assigned 1 October 1962 – 8 February 1964
- 563d Fighter-Bomber Squadron (later 563d Tactical Fighter Squadron): attached 1 July – 10 December 1957; assigned 1 October 1962 – 8 February 1964
- 6010th Wild Weasel Squadron: 1 November 1970 – 1 December 1971
- 17th Wild Weasel Squadron: 1 December 1971 – 15 November 1974
- 729th Air Control Squadron: 1 October 1985 – 1 October 2007

Attached Squadrons

- 13th Tactical Fighter Squadron: attached 15 May 1966 – 20 October 1967
- 16th Special Operations Squadron: attached 19 July 1974 – 8 December 1975
- 35th Tactical Fighter Squadron: attached c. 12 June-c. 10 October 1972

=== Stations ===
- Clovis Air Force Base, New Mexico, 23 November 1953 – 28 November 1954
- Étain-Rouvres Air Base, France, 12 December 1954 – 10 December 1957
- McConnell Air Force Base, Kansas, 1 October 1962 – 8 February 1964
- Korat Royal Thai Air Force Base, Thailand, 8 April 1966
- Hill Air Force Base, Utah, 23 December 1975 – present

=== Aircraft ===
- North American F-100 Super Sabre, 1957; 1962–1964
- Republic F-105 Thunderchief, 1963–1964; 1966–1969; 1970–1974
- McDonnell F-4 Phantom II, 1968–1975, 1976–1980
- Douglas EB-66 Destroyer, 1970–1974
- Lockheed EC-121 Warning Star, 1970–1971
- Lockheed C-130|AC/C-130 Hercules, 1972–1975
- Ling-Temco-Vought A-7D Corsair II, 1973–1975
- General Dynamics F-16 Fighting Falcon, 1979–2017
- Lockheed Martin F-35 Lightning II, 2015–present
