= Utah Test and Training Range =

Testing and training area by the U.S. Department of Defense

Coordinates: 41°00′00″N 113°15′00″W

The Utah Test and Training Range (UTTR) is a Department of Defense military testing and training area located in Utah's West Desert, approximately 80 miles (130 km) west of Salt Lake City. UTTR is currently the largest contiguous block of over-land supersonic-authorized restricted airspace in the contiguous United States. The range, which has a footprint of 2,675 square miles (6,930 km^{2}) of ground space and over 19,000 square miles (49,000 km^{2}) of air space, is divided into North and South ranges. Interstate 80 passes through a wide gap between the two sections of the range. The site is administered and maintained by the United States Air Force (USAF) HQ UTTR, formerly known as the 388th Range Squadron (388RANS) stationed at Hill Air Force Base, Utah. The East and West areas of the Dugway Proving Ground are contiguous with the South Area of the UTTR.

== History ==
The Wendover Army Air Field was created in 1942 for research and training, with testing of Republic-Ford JB-2 (U.S. copy of the V-1 flying bomb) in 1945-1946, the Matador in the 1950s, and Minuteman motor testing and development in the 1960s. Wendover property was split and transferred to the nearby city, but land for the test range was kept, becoming the Utah Test and Training Range in 1979 under the Air Force Systems Command.

== Activities ==
=== Military ===
UTTR is host to a variety of training and testing missions for the USAF, United States Army, and United States Marine Corps. The site is frequently used for the disposal of explosive ordnance, testing of experimental military equipment, as well as ground and air military training exercises. The UTTR works in close conjunction with Dugway Proving Ground for military training exercises.

=== Space ===
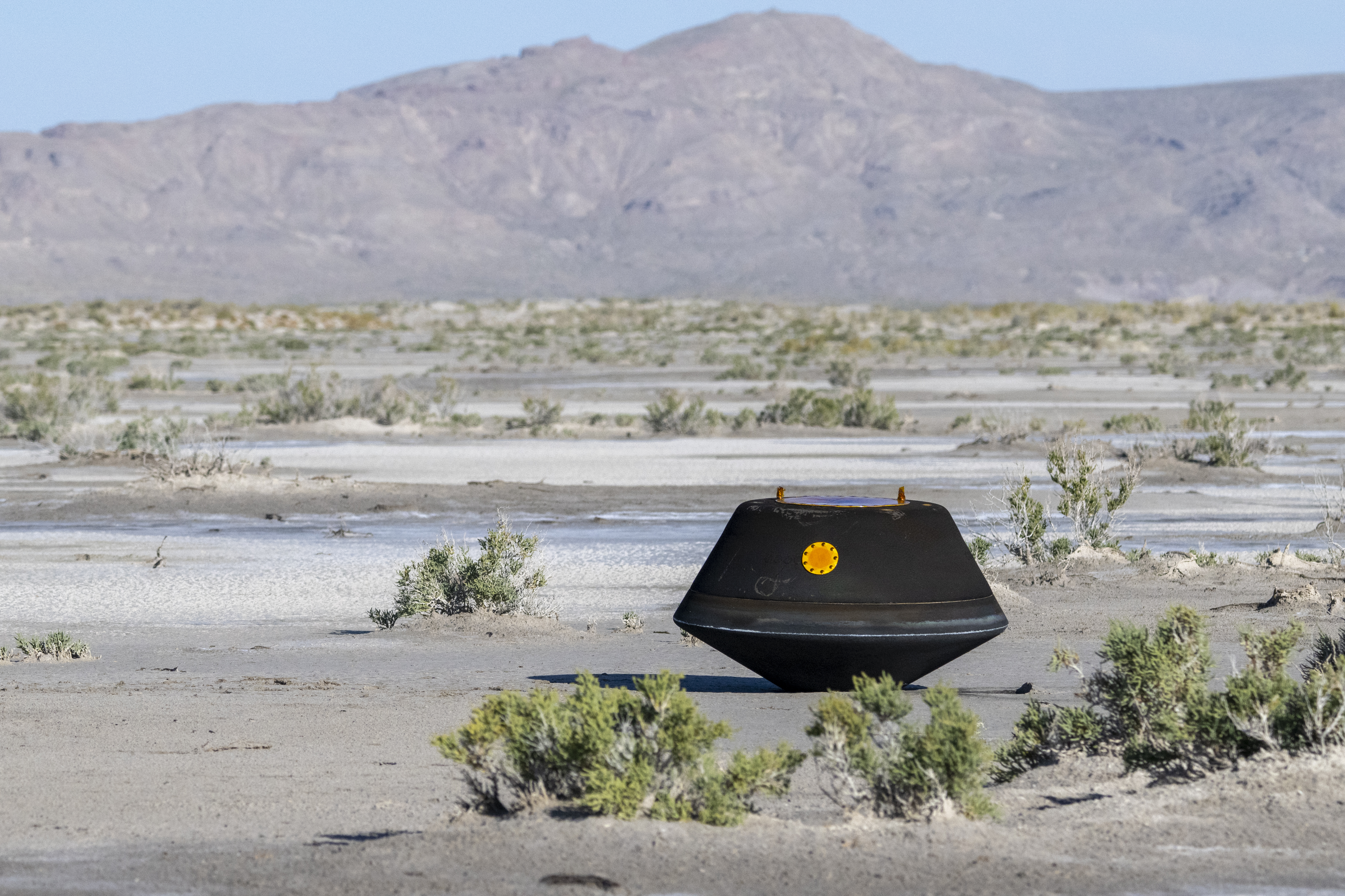
OSIRIS-REx return capsule after landing at UTTR in 2023

The site has also been used as a landing site for sample return in NASA's planetary science missions, including comet material in the Stardust mission and the OSIRIS-REx mission to return material from asteroid (101955) Bennu.

UTTR was used as the landing site for the Genesis sample return mission. Although the sample return capsule's parachute failed to open and the capsule made a hard landing in the soft sandy soil, most of the collected scientific materials were salvaged. The solar wind particle collectors were made of wafers of aluminum, sapphire, silicon, germanium, gold and diamond-like amorphous carbon. When the capsule hit the desert floor, the wafers shattered into over 10,000 pieces of material. The Genesis team, along with the efforts of the USAF's Photographic and Engineering Technician team, set up a clean room at Dugway Proving Ground. NASA scientists spent months filtering through the material, each of the salvageable pieces of material going into its own small container where they were stored for a short time. Some weeks later, one of the lead scientists and the supervisor of the engineering technicians came upon what turned out to be the solar wind concentrator. Protected by a couple of aluminum braces and brackets, the concentrator had survived almost completely intact with only one small crack in one of its quadrants.

== See also ==
- Tekoi
- Nevada Test and Training Range
- Space Test and Training Range
- Naval Air Weapons Station China Lake
