= Acquisition Intelligence =

Field of military intelligence

Acquisition Intelligence (Acq Intel) is the field that combines military intelligence, acquisition processes, and logistics fundamentals to ensure supportability of weapons systems. Acq Intel originated within the Air Force Materiel Command at Wright Patterson AFB circa 2004, and matured into a numbered USAF Squadron. It is offered as a college certificate program.

== Detailed Description / Background ==
Advanced weaponry is providing an exponential increase in intelligence data collection capabilities and the Intelligence Community (IC) is not properly positioned for the influx of intelligence supportability requirements the defense acquisition community is developing for it. The Air Force Materiel Command (AFMC) has initiated the Intelligence Supportability Analysis

(ISA) process to allow the IC to triage programs for intelligence sensitivities as well as begin preparations within the IC for the transition of future programs to operational status. The ISA process is accomplished through system decomposition, allowing analysts to identify intelligence requirements and deficiencies. Early collaboration and engagement by program managers and intelligence analysts is crucial to the success of intelligence sensitive programs through the utilization of a repeatable analytical framework for evaluating and making cognizant trade-offs between cost, schedule and performance.

Addressing intelligence supportability early in the acquisition process will also influence system design and provide the necessary lead time for intelligence community to react and resource new requirements.
