= Intelligence Bureau of the Joint Staff Department =

Military intelligence agency of the People's Liberation Army

Intelligence Bureau of the Joint Staff Department of the Central Military Commission
- 中央军委联合参谋部情报局
- PLA Joint Staff Department Patch

Agency overview
- Formed: January 2016
- Preceding agency: General Staff Department Intelligence Bureau
- Type: Constituent Department of the Joint Staff Department of the Central Military Commission
- Jurisdiction: People's Liberation Army
- Headquarters: Dongcheng, Beijing
- Annual budget: Classified
- Agency executive: Xu Youming
- Parent department: Joint Staff Department of the Central Military Commission

The Intelligence Bureau of the Joint Staff Department of the Central Military Commission (Chinese: 中央军委联合参谋部情报局; pinyin: Lián cān qíngbào jú) is a bureau of the Joint Staff Department. It is one of the People's Republic of China's primary intelligence organizations and the principal military intelligence organ of the People's Liberation Army (PLA).

The organization was formerly referred to as the Intelligence Department of the General Staff Department, the Second Department, or simply 2PLA. In 2016, CMC chairman Xi Jinping implemented substantial military reforms for the armed services, the theater commands, and the Central Military Commission (CMC) that have been compared to the United States' Goldwater–Nichols or Russian Serdyukov reforms. As part of the restructuring of the CMC, the former General Staff Department (GSD) was replaced by the Joint Staff Department (JSD) and subordinate units, to include the Intelligence Bureau, were transferred to the new Joint Staff Department. The Government of the People's Republic of China has not officially acknowledged the existence of Intelligence Bureau.

== Overview ==
Although each of the PLA's military services conduct their own operational and tactical intelligence collection and analysis, the Intelligence Bureau of the JSD is responsible for strategic intelligence collection and analysis, primarily in clandestine and overt human intelligence (HUMINT) operations as well as warning intelligence to the CMC. Other intelligence disciplines such as signals intelligence (SIGINT), and electronic intelligence (ELINT) were previously the responsibilities of the Third and Fourth Bureaus, respectively, of the GSD but have likely moved to the PLA's Strategic Support Force.

The PLA distinguishes "intelligence" (Chinese: 情报; pinyin: qíngbào), which refers to strategic, all-source analysis to support national decision-making, from "technical reconnaissance" (Chinese: 技术侦察; pinyin: jìshù zhēnchá) which refers to technical intelligence collection in support of military operations. Though the former 2nd Bureau of the GSD was responsible for imagery intelligence (IMINT) through its subordinate Aerospace Reconnaissance Bureau (ARB) which analyzed imagery from Yaogan, Gaofen, and other Earth-observation satellites and Tactical Reconnaissance Bureau which managed strategic, long-range UAVs, these organizations were relocated to the PLA's Strategic Support Force as their role was seen as more supportive of military operations than national decision-making.

The current commissioner of the Intelligence Bureau of the Joint Staff Department of the Central Military Commission is suspected to be Xu Youming (Chinese: 许有明) who took control of the agency upon its establishment in 2016. Xu's position as commissioner of the Intelligence Bureau is, like the existence of the bureau itself, not acknowledged by the Chinese government, but was subtly exposed in an official press release by the Beijing Municipal Bureau of Greening as a participant in a city-wide tree planting event. Prior to his position as commissioner, Xu was a military attaché stationed in the Chinese Embassies in Uzbekistan, Kazakhstan, and Brazil and has been referred to by the Chinese government as "a former military attaché of the Chinese Embassy in Brazil" as late as 2021.

The Intelligence Bureau controls several think tanks, such as the China Institute for International and Strategic Studies and the China Foundation for International Strategic Studies, to interact with foreign academics and analysts.

== History ==
In 1931, Zhou Enlai gathered trusted communist comrades that he had personally worked with in Paris or Shanghai to establish an Intelligence Bureau (later called the General Intelligence Department) under its Central Military Commission. The new intelligence service was created specifically to maintain an intelligence body outside the control of the increasingly paranoid and power-hungry influence of Kang Sheng. In 1950, it became part of the PLA General Staff (until 1954 known as the "General Staff of the People's Revolutionary Military Committee"), and was referred to as "the 2nd Bureau" as the PLA adopted the Soviet model of organization.

During the rule of Mao Zedong, and especially under the leadership of General Liu Shaowen (Director of the Intelligence Bureau from 1954 to 1967), the 2nd Bureau was active in funding, arming and training dozens of Asian, African and Latin American militant groups and liberation movements; especially in the case of Africa, the Intelligence Bureau "supplied, at one time or another, nearly all of the various African liberation movements with arms, money, food and medicines". Among those who received military training were Pol Pot (leader of the Khmer Rouge in Cambodia) and Abimael Guzmán (leader of the Shining Path in Peru).

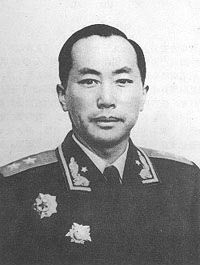
General Liu Shaowen, Director of the Intelligence Bureau from 1954 to 1967, played a key role in providing military assistance to various national liberation movements across the world, including the FLN, Viet Cong, Pathet Lao and ANC.

From the early 1970s and until the end of the Cold War, beginning with the tactical alliance of Mao Zedong and U.S. President Richard Nixon to jointly oppose the Soviet Union, the 2nd Bureau unofficially collaborated with the American CIA in certain cases, most notably in Afghanistan, where Chinese intelligence (both civilian and military) played a central role in funding, arming and training Afghan guerrillas against the Soviets. From 1980 to 1984 the cost of Chinese support totaled approximately $400 million. In a joint operation of the 2nd Bureau and the Ministry of State Security, Chinese assistance expanded to eventually include heavy machine guns, mortars, recoilless rifles, rocket launchers and anti-aircraft artillery. Throughout the 1980s, the 2nd Bureau used companies such as CITIC Group, China Poly Group, and Norinco as cover for intelligence activities.

In January 2016, as part of the ongoing reform of national defense and the military, the Intelligence Bureau of the Chinese People's Liberation Army General Staff Department was abolished and the Intelligence Bureau of the Joint Staff of the Central Military Commission was established.

== Activities ==
In December 1987, two Chinese military attachés working on behalf of the PLA's 2nd Department at the Chinese Embassy in Washington were caught soliciting and attempting to receive supposedly classified documents from the United States National Security Agency (NSA) given them by an undercover FBI agent in a Chinese restaurant not far from FBI headquarters. Protected by diplomatic immunity, the two agents, Hou Desheng and Zhang Weichu were asked to leave the country and did so "after finishing their tenures in the United States" according to the Chinese Consulate General in Chicago.

In 1996, Chinese Lieutenant Colonel Liu Chaoying, an executive at China Aerospace International Holdings and the princeling daughter of Admiral Liu Huaqing (the "Father of the Chinese Navy", former Navy Commander-in-Chief, former Vice-Chairman of the CMC, and member of the Politburo Standing Committee), introduced Taiwanese-born naturalized American Johnny Chung to the then head of the PLA's 2nd Department Major General Ji Shengde, the princeling son of Ji Pengfei, China's foreign minister during U.S. President Richard Nixon's visit to China in 1972. In violation of U.S. campaign finance laws, Ji provided Chung $300,000 USD of 2nd Department funds to donate to the Democratic National Committee (DNC) in support of incumbent President Bill Clinton's 1996 election campaign and told him "We like your president very much. We would like to see him reelect [sic]. I will give you $300,000 US dollars. You can give it to the president and the Democrat [sic] Party." After providing testimony to the FBI and a House Committee, Chung was eventually convicted of bank fraud, tax evasion, and two misdemeanor counts of conspiring to violate election law in one of the more prominent cases of the 1996 campaign finance controversy. Both the Chinese government and Liu Chaoying flatly denied the accusations and faced no apparent consequences from the incident. Ji, however, was quietly reassigned from his role as director of the 2nd Department to a lower position at a military research center. Ji's exact role or whether he was authorized to spend the Department's money on Clinton's campaign were never clarified.

In February 1999, Chinese citizen Yao Yi, who was in the employ of the PLA's 2nd Department, was arrested by U.S. federal agents for attempting to smuggle back to China fiber-optic gyroscopes vital to missile guidance systems with his Chinese-Canadian associate Collin Xu. Though the U.S. had cut off transfers of fiber-optic gyroscopes to China in an effort to stem the nation's rapid missile developments, Yao Yi twice attempted in May 1998 to file to transfer the gyroscopes to China and was twice denied by the U.S. Department of State. Yi then allied with Collin Xu to request the desired gyroscopes from the Massachusetts defense contractor Fibersense Technology Corporation in Canton, Massachusetts. Aware of the current export controls on fiber-optic gyroscopes transfers to China, a federal complaint was filed leading the Customs Service in collaboration with the Royal Canadian Mounted Police to set up a sting operation involving a dummy corporation from which Yi and Xu would later attempt to purchase the same gyroscopes, unaware that all but one purchased gyroscope was fake. Although Xu had been arrested two weeks later in Boston, Yi was arrested while attending a conference on fiber optics in San Diego claiming to be working on behalf of the Beijing firm Lions Photonics and that the gyroscopes were intended to be used by a Chinese university working on a railroad project. A federal official anonymously joked that using those fiber-optic gyroscopes with infrared sensors on a railroad project "would be like flying an F-14 to the grocery store." Yi's arrest occurred just hours after the Clinton administration had decided in a major decision to prevent Hughes Electronics from exporting a US$450 million communications satellite to an organization with links to the People's Liberation Army fearing the technology would improve the accuracy of Chinese missiles. News of Yi's arrest took place while Secretary of State Madeleine Albright was visiting Beijing. Yi was escorted to a nearby federal court in San Diego where he agreed to be transferred to Boston for trial. Both Yao Yi and Collin Xu were sentenced to 30 months in prison and 36 months supervised release.

In 2000, head of PLA's 2nd Department Major General Ji Shengde was convicted for embezzlement and bribery in, what was at the time, one of China's most politically sensitive corruption cases. The case, unrelated to his prior involvement in illegally donating to President Clinton's reelection, stemmed from Ji's acceptance of bribes from China's most-wanted fugitive, Lai Changxing, and embezzlement of millions of dollars from military-run corporations, all while occupying the vital national security post of director of the PLA's 2nd Department. The case, which removed a significant number of senior government officials, led to Lai's flee to Vancouver where he was detained and extradited to China in 2011 on the agreement he wouldn't be executed and was sentenced to life imprisonment in 2012. Ji's charges included embezzlement of funds appropriated for military-run corporations through investments in the stock market and real estate.

Also in 2007, an operative of the 2nd Department tricked a cleared American intelligence analyst into providing classified information on planned weapons sales to Taiwan. The Taiwanese-born naturalized American citizen Tai Shen Kuo who had been living as a furniture salesman in Louisiana for more than 30 years convinced Gregg W. Bergersen, a cleared weapons systems policy analyst and director of C4ISR programs at the United States' Defense Security Cooperation Agency (DSCA), to share information on all planned sale of weapons and military technology to Taiwan for the next five years and details of Taiwan's Po Sheng communications and defense systems thinking he was providing the information to the Republic of China though Kuo forwarded all the information back to the 2nd Department. In a video shot by a concealed FBI camera within Bergersen's vehicle and published by CBS' 60 Minutes in 2010, Bergersen said to Kuo "I'm very, very, very reticent to let you have it because it's all classified, but I will let you see it. You can take all the notes you want, but if it ever fell into the wrong hands, and I know it's not going to, but if it ever, then I would be fired for sure. I'd go to jail, because I violated all the rules." In the same video, Kuo is shown placing around US$2,000 in Bergersen's breast pocket. The FBI only learned of the case while investigating another instance of Chinese espionage. In 2008, Bergersen was sentenced to 5 years imprisonment and Kuo to 15 years.

In 2013, Taiwan sentenced retired Republic of China Air Force Lieutenant Colonel Yuan Hsiao-feng to 12 life sentences for providing the 2nd Department classified military information for over six years. Chen Wen-jen, a Taiwanese Air Force lieutenant discharged in 1992, had moved to Mainland China, married his wife and settled there. After Chen started a business, he was quickly recruited by the 2nd Department of the General Staff Department. At the behest of the 2nd Department, Chen returned to Taiwan and recruited his old associate, Yuan, the both of which continued to pass classified information on Taiwanese combat aircraft back to the 2nd Department on flash drives. Chen received a twenty-year prison sentence instead of the mandatory life sentences for military servicemembers.

In 2021, Estonia charged a High-level scientist Tarmo Kõuts, with specialization in marine research. He was working at a NATO research institution focused on maritime and submarine research and had spied for China's Intelligence Bureau of JSDCMS since 2018.

== Directors ==
Directors of the Intelligence Bureau
| No. | Period | English name | Chinese name |
|---|---|---|---|
| 1 | 1932 | Wu Xiuquan | 伍修权 |
| 2 | 1932–1938 | Luo Ruiqing | 罗瑞卿 |
| 3 | 1938–1946 | Kang Shen | 康生 |
| 4 | 1948–1949 | Li Kenong | 李克农 |
| 5 | 1950–1953 | Li Kenong | 李克农 |
| 6 | 1950–1951 | Liu Zhijian | 刘志坚 |
| 7 | 1952–1954 | Yan Kuiyao | 阎揆要 |
| 8 | 1954–1967 | Liu Shaowen | 刘少文 |
| 9 | 1967–1969 | Shen Shazi | 渗砂子 |
| 10 | 1970–1975 | Zhang Ting | 张廷 |
| 11 | 1975–1978 | Peng Mingzhi | 彭明治 |
| 12 | 1978–1982 | Liu Guangfu | 刘光甫 |
| 13 | 1982–1985 | Zhang Zhongru | 张中如 |
| 14 | 1988 | Wu Jinfa | 戊进法 |
| 15 | 1988–1992 | Xiong Guangkai | 熊光楷 |
| 16 | 1993–1995 | Luo Yudong | 罗宇栋 |
| 17 | 1995–1999 | Ji Shengde | 姬胜德 |
| 18 | 1999–2001 | Chen Kaizeng | 陈开曾 |
| 19 | 2001–2003 | Luo Yudong | 罗宇栋 |
| 20 | 2004–2006 | Huang Baifu | 黄柏富 |
| 21 | 2006–2007 | Chen Xiaogong | 陈小功 |
| 22 | 2007–2011 | Yang Hui | 杨晖 |
| 23 | 2011–2015 | Chen Youyi | 陈友谊 |
| 24 | 2015 | Wang Xiao | 王肖 |
| 25 | 2016– | Chen Youyi | |
Source: Roger Faligot's Chinese Spies
