= Amaury Rivera =

Puerto Rican businessman (born 1962)

- Born: June 15, 1962 (age 63); San Juan, Puerto Rico
- Occupations: Manager, Telecommunications and Biopharmaceutical

Amaury Rivera (born June 15, 1962) was a chairman and CEO of Kinetics Systems Caribe. He set up the two earliest competitors to the dominant Puerto Rico Telephone Company when the U.S. territory's telecommunication's market was opened to competition in 1996.

== Early life and education ==
Rivera holds a Bachelor of Science in Business Administration from Boston University. Rivera studied finance at New York University and underwriting at The Bond School.

== Business ==
From 2003 to 2008 Rivera headed Kinetics Systems Caribe.

From 2000 to 2003 Rivera served as corporate senior vice president of strategic marketing in Sunrise, Florida. In addition, he was chief executive officer of Convergence Communications, Inc. He was responsible for a landmark deal at the time in the industry which was the largest publicly announced contract for Guardent for a $27 million channel agreement with Convergence Communications for 24 X 7 managed security services.

Rivera was responsible for the marketing and sales strategy of a joint partnership of Verizon Communications and Grupo IUSA in Mexico, IUSACELL, SA de CV. He served as senior vice president of marketing in 1998–2000.

Rivera was recognized as Mexico's best marketing executive in 1998 by the Mexican Businessmen Chamber.

From 1996 to 1998, while in his mid-30s, Rivera was responsible for the start-up of Centennial and Lamda Communications, the first two competitors of the dominant Puerto Rico Telephone Company, as a result of the 1996 Federal Telecommunications Act and the local Puerto Rico Telecommunications Act. His efforts at both companies provided local consumers choices they had never had in the wireless and wireline markets.

Rivera served as vice president and general manager of Perry Products of Puerto Rico from 1993 to 1995.

During 1989–1993, Rivera was assistant to the president and vice president of Industrias Vassallo Inc.

From 1984 to 1989, Rivera worked as a Wall Street financial analyst and investment banker for Bear Stearns & Co. in New York.

== Active and past board participation ==
Rivera was an independent board member of Banco Bilbao Vizcaya Argentaria.

Rivera was Secretary, vice president and president of the Board of the Puerto Rico Products Association.

Rivera was chairman of the Universal Service Committee of the Puerto Rico Telecommunications Board 1997.

Rivera served as member of Small Business Round Table of Exports under Secretary of Commerce Ronald Brown during Bill Clinton’s presidency.

Rivera was a delegate and member of the Conference on Small Businesses of the White House; he also presided over the San Juan area hearings in 1996.

Rivera was a member of the Export Committee for the Center of Opportunities for Minority Businesses of the United States Chamber of Commerce, 1995–1996.

== Awards and recognition ==
- Mexico’s Best Business Executive in Marketing in 1998 by the Mexican Businessmen Chamber Association.
- The Caribbean Business (Puerto Rico) recognized Amaury Rivera as one of the Top Ten Business Leaders of Puerto Rico in 1997 as selected by its readers.
- “Revista Caras” Caras Magazine selected Rivera as the most successful young executives under 40 in 1998.
- In 1995, The Young Businessman Committee of the Interamerican Business Association bestowed Rivera “The Young Businessman of the Year” Award.
- The Puerto Rico Legislature unanimously issued a congratulatory proclamation in favor of Rivera for his achievements as president of the Puerto Rico Products Association

== See also ==
- List of Puerto Ricans
