= Commerce Department trade mission controversy =

American political controversy in the 1990s

The Commerce Department trade mission controversy was an American political controversy in the 1990s during the Clinton Administration. It refers to the alleged selling of seats on United States federal planes going on international trade missions, for the purpose of raising campaign contributions. No official charges were ever made in conjunction with the allegations but the Commerce Department did change its policies regarding the selection of participants for such missions so they would not be politically based.

== Allegations ==
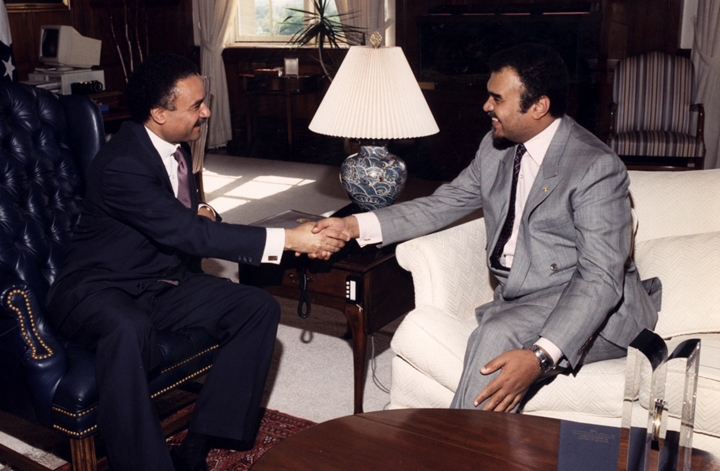
U.S. Secretary of Commerce Ron Brown (left) shaking hands at a meeting.

Ties between the U.S. Commerce Department and the Democratic National Committee had been a subject of scrutiny ever since Ron Brown became U.S. Secretary of Commerce in 1993.

The first reports of the alleged connections between seats on trade missions and political donations came in September 1994 with reports in Business Week and The Wall Street Journal. The trips in question involved CEOs of Fortune 500 and other companies and trips to China, Hong Kong, Russia, India, South Africa, and elsewhere. The campaign contributions allegedly tied to the trips ranged up to $100,000, although lesser amounts were also made reference to. Both the Clinton administration and contributors denied any quid pro quo, but unnamed figures in the Clinton and lobbying orbits said making donations, in general, helped one's prospects.

Largely coincident to this, there were allegations of financial improprieties between Brown and a business partner, Nolanda Hill. These allegations got the attention of Republican House member Dan Burton by early 1995. In July 1995, an Independent Counsel, Daniel Pearson, was appointed to investigate these allegations.

== Lawsuit and analyses ==
Conservative legal group Judicial Watch filed a federal lawsuit seeking information in 1995. They filed an action in the United States District Court for the District of Columbia under the Freedom of Information Act seeking information from the Department of Commerce regarding the department's selection of participants for foreign trade missions. In May 1995, following a search in response to Judicial Watch's FOIA requests, the Department produced approximately 28,000 pages of nonexempt information and withheld about 1,000 documents as exempt. Disputes arose between the parties over the adequacy of Commerce's search, and Judicial Watch charged that some Department officials had destroyed or removed responsive documents.

Some of the documents released under this process did show that contributors expected their donations to gain them consideration when seats were selected for Brown's flights, and a few of the documents showed the seats being rewarded accordingly. However a 1996 analysis by the nonpartisan but liberal-leaning Center for Public Integrity found that Democratic contributors only filled a third of the available trip seats, and many of those made contributions to Republicans as well.

== Death of Secretary Brown ==
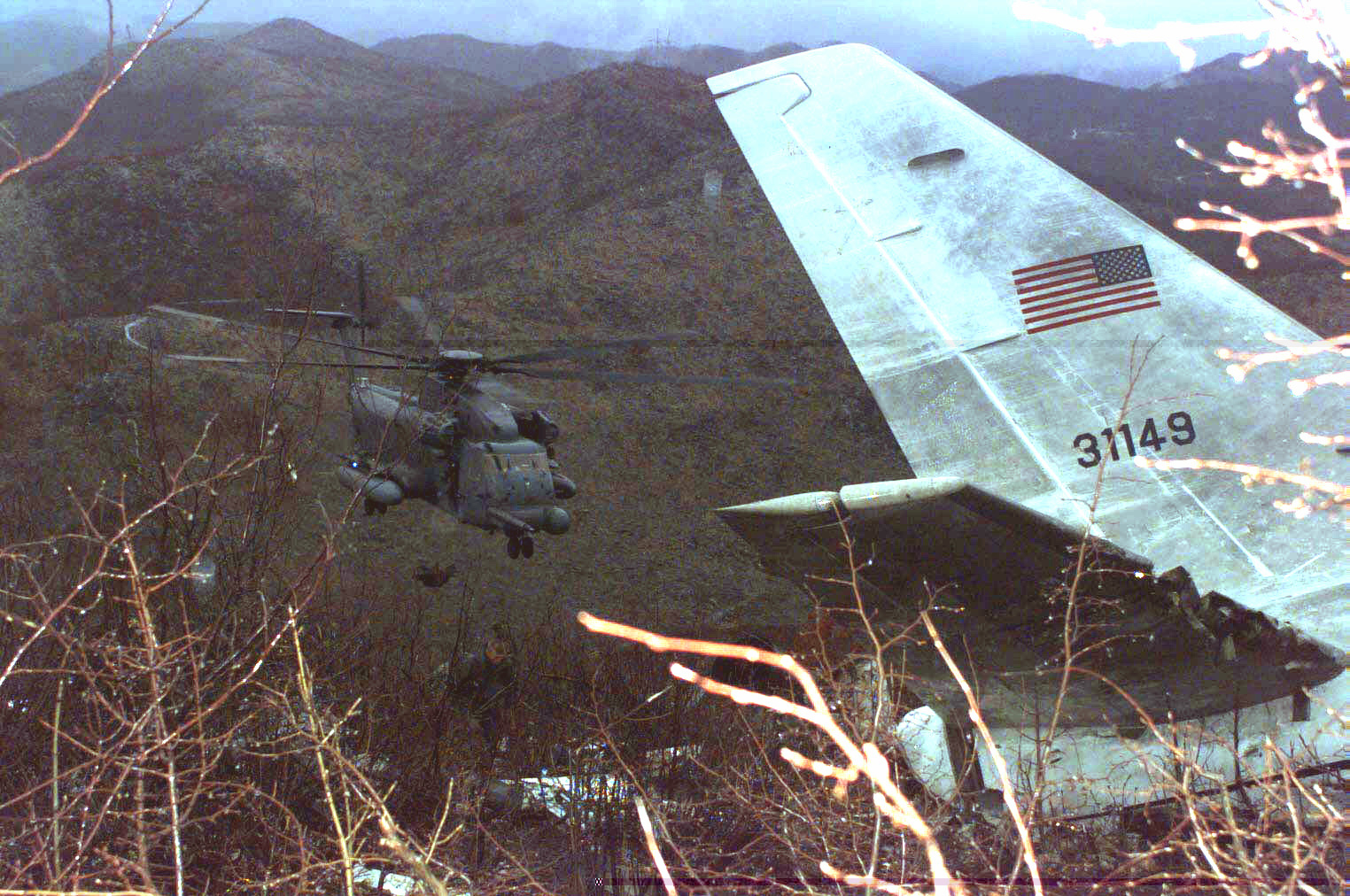
Wreckage of IFO-21 on a mountain in Croatia

Secretary Brown died on a trade mission to Croatia, when the government plane he was on flew into a mountainside on April 3 in the 1996 Croatia USAF CT-43 crash. This led to conservative accusations that Clinton had Brown murdered; U.S. Attorney General Janet Reno and others scoffed at this conspiracy theory. Soon after, Nolanda Hill declared that she had been engaging in a long-running affair with Brown.

The trade missions controversy became more visible in 1996 as an outgrowth of the 1996 United States campaign finance controversy and investigations of Democratic fundraiser John Huang. It became an issue during the 1996 United States presidential election, in which Clinton was nevertheless re-elected.

In November 1996, independent counsel Daniel Pearson reported: "My office's investigation of Secretary Brown ended unfinished with his death. The unfinished state of the investigation and considerations of fairness preclude our office from drawing conclusions about the allegations regarding possible criminal conduct by the Secretary."

== Outcomes and consequences ==
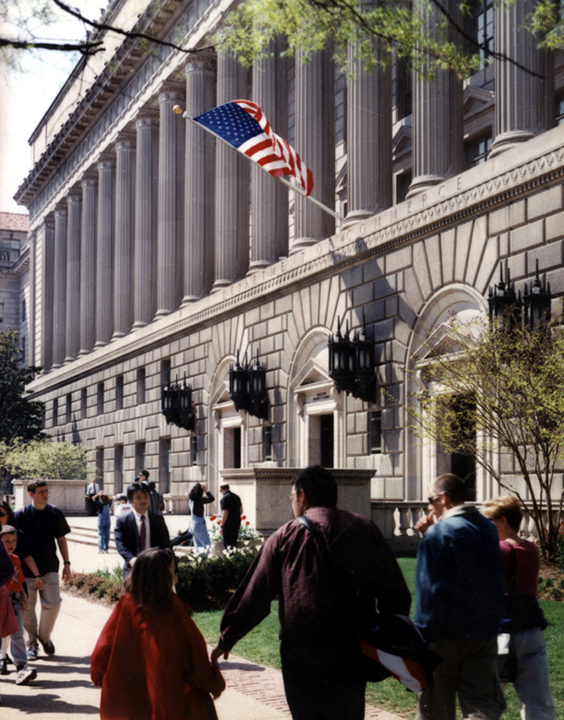
U.S. Department of Commerce building in Washington, D.C.

Responding to the original criticism, in March 1997 new Commerce Secretary William M. Daley instituted new departmental policies intended to prevent politics from being part of the trade missions selection process. He also pledged the process would be far more transparent than in the past. Daley said the new rules were not necessarily an admission that prior practices were improper: "This [is] about going forward, not looking back."

In June 1997, Nolanda Hill, the aforementioned business and personal associate of Brown, was the subject of a major profile piece in The New Yorker which detailed her colorful business past and her relationship with Brown. Hill testified in federal court in March 1998 that Brown had told her that trade mission plane seats were sold to people willing to make campaign contributions. U.S. District Court Judge Royce Lamberth heard Hill's testimony, rejecting her argument that her testimony would adversely affect a federal indictment she was under for fraudulent business practices. Hill stated Brown was angered when White House political staff made him give seats on the trade missions for fund-raising. Hill said Brown told her the main person involved at the White House was Alexis Herman (who would later become Clinton's Labor Secretary); she further claimed that Brown had told her that an assistant to Herman, Melissa Moss, wrote the original contribution letters which had upset Brown. Hill also testified that Brown had told her President Bill Clinton and First Lady Hillary Rodham Clinton supported the plan to sell seats for contributions. In one memorable turn, she said that Brown had complained that "I'm not a motherfucking tour guide for Hillary."

In January 1999, Judge Lamberth found that a U.S. Commerce Department official appeared to have deliberately destroyed subpoenaed documents relating to the department's trade missions to China, following Brown's death.

In February 1999, Nolanda Hill pleaded guilty to three counts of aiding and abetting the preparation and filing of a false income tax return.
