= 1996 United States campaign finance controversy =

Chinese lobbying controversy in the United States

The 1996 United States campaign finance controversy, sometimes referred to as Chinagate, was an effort by the People's Republic of China to influence domestic American politics prior to and during the Clinton administration and also involved the fundraising practices of the administration itself.

While questions regarding the Democratic Party's fundraising activities first arose over a Los Angeles Times article published on September 21, 1996, China's role in the affair first gained public attention when Bob Woodward and Brian Duffy of The Washington Post published a story stating that a United States Department of Justice investigation into the fundraising activities had uncovered evidence that agents of China sought to direct contributions from foreign sources to the Democratic National Committee (DNC) before the 1996 presidential campaign. The journalists wrote that intelligence information had shown the Chinese embassy in Washington, D.C. was used for coordinating contributions to the DNC in violation of United States law forbidding non-American citizens or non-permanent residents from giving monetary donations to United States politicians and political parties. A Republican investigator of the controversy stated that the Chinese plan targeted both presidential and congressional United States elections, while Democratic senators said the evidence showed the Chinese targeted only congressional elections. The government of China denied all accusations.

== Background ==
According to the U.S. Senate report, Chinese officials eventually developed a set of proposals to promote their interests with the United States government and to improve China's image with the American people. The proposals, dubbed the "China Plan", were prompted by the United States Congress's successful lobbying of President Bill Clinton to grant a visa to Taiwan President Lee Teng-hui. U.S. Secretary of State Warren Christopher had previously assured his Chinese counterpart Chinese Foreign Minister Qian Qichen that granting a visa would be "inconsistent with [the United States'] unofficial relationship [with Taiwan]" and the Clinton Administration's acquiescence to the Congressional resolutions led China to conclude that the influence of Congress over foreign policy was more significant than it had previously determined. When formulating the so-called plan, Chinese officials acknowledged that, compared to other countries, it had little knowledge of, or influence over, policy decisions made in Congress, which had a sizeable pro-Taiwan faction under the influence of a more established "China Lobby" run by the Kuomintang. The plan, according to the Senate report, instructed Chinese officials in the U.S. to improve their knowledge about members of Congress and increase contacts with its members, the public, and the media. The plan also suggested ways to lobby United States officials.

Over the years, China repeatedly denied that their lobbying efforts involved financial contributions of any kind, e.g., stating "some people and media in the United States speculated... about so-called participation by Chinese individuals in political donations during the U.S. elections. It is sheer fabrication and is intended to slander China. [China] has never, nor will we ever, use money to influence American politics"—a Chinese Foreign Ministry spokesperson, May 1998.

== Major fund-raising figures ==
=== Yah-Lin "Charlie" Trie ===
The most significant activity by Yah-Lin "Charlie" Trie (崔亞琳) was a $450,000 attempted donation from him to Clinton's legal defense fund (for his impeachment trials) which Trie allegedly delivered in two envelopes each containing several checks and money orders. The fund immediately rejected $70,000 and deposited the remainder, but ordered an investigation of the source. The investigation found that some of the money orders were made out in different names but with the same handwriting, and sequentially numbered. The fund then rejected the donation entirely, and allegedly returned the deposited funds two months after the initial contribution.

Born in Taiwan, Trie emigrated to the U.S. in 1974. He eventually became an American citizen and co-owner of a restaurant in Little Rock, Arkansas. The 1997 special investigation describes Trie as having attempted to develop an international trading business (Daihatsu International Trading Corporation), having maintained or accessed accounts in Little Rock and Washington, D.C., into which Macau-based real estate businessman Ng Lap Seng wired >$1M USD from Macau and Hong Kong accounts, and as having never succeeded in the trading business (based on bank and tax records indicating substantive income only from Ng).

In Little Rock, Trie befriended Clinton, then Governor of Arkansas. In addition to the attempted donation to Clinton's defense fund, Trie and his immediate family donated $220,000 to the DNC which was also later returned. Immediately after the donation to Clinton's defense fund, Trie sent a letter to President Clinton that expressed concern about America's intervention in tensions arising from China's military exercises being conducted near Taiwan. Trie told the President in his letter that war with China was a possibility should U.S. intervention continue:

[O]nce the hard parties of the Chinese military incline to grasp U.S. involvement as foreign intervention, is [sic] U.S. ready to face such [a] challenge[?]... [I]t is highly possible for China to launch real war based on its past behavior in [sic] Sino-Vietnam War and Zhen Bao Tao war with Russia. (Charlie Trie, letter to President Clinton, March 21, 1996)."

After Congressional investigations turned to Trie in late 1996, he left the country for China. Trie returned to the U.S. in 1998 and was convicted and sentenced to three years' probation and four months' home detention for violating federal campaign finance laws by making political contributions in someone else's name and for causing a false statement to be made to the Federal Election Commission (FEC).

=== Johnny Chung ===
Born in Taiwan, Johnny Chung went from being the owner of a "blastfaxing" business (an automated system that quickly sends out faxes to thousands of businesses) in California to being in the middle of the Washington, D.C. elite within a couple weeks of his first donations to the Democratic Party. Called a "hustler" by a U.S. National Security Council (NSC) aide, Chung made forty-nine separate visits to the White House between February 1994 and February 1996. One of his purposes in making these trips was to obtain photographs of himself with the Clintons, which he believed would help him to get business in China by giving people the impression that he had connections and influence in Washington—he used a brochure that included at least ten photographs of himself with Hillary Clinton along with a personal note from her. During one of the U.S. Commerce Department trade missions to China, Chung befriended former Chinese Lt. Col. Liu Chaoying, then an executive at China Aerospace International Holdings (中國航天國際控股有限公司), which is the Hong Kong-based subsidiary of the government-controlled CASC (中國航天科技集團公司), China's premier satellite launching company. She is the daughter of former General Liu Huaqing.

Between 1994 and 1996, Chung donated $366,000 to the DNC. Once the truth of this situation was revealed to the public, all of the money was allegedly returned. Chung told federal investigators that $35,000 of the money he donated came from Liu Chaoying and, in turn, China's military intelligence.

Specifically, Chung testified under oath to the U.S. House Committee investigating the issue in May 1999 that he was introduced to Chinese Gen. Ji Shengde, then the head of Chinese military intelligence, by Liu Chaoying. Chung said that Ji told him: "We like your president very much. We would like to see him reelect [sic]. I will give you 300,000 U.S. dollars. You can give it to the president and the Democrat [sic] Party." Both Liu and the Chinese government denied the claims.

Chung was eventually sentenced to five years' probation and community service following an agreement to plea guilty to bank fraud, tax evasion, and two misdemeanor counts of conspiring to violate election law.

=== John Huang and James Riady ===
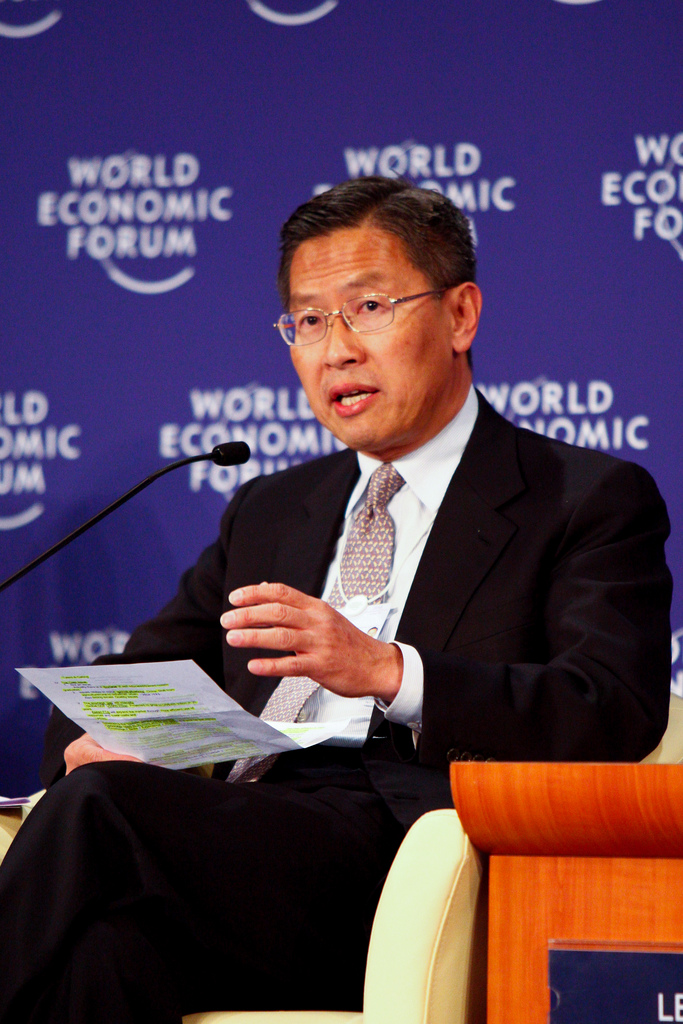
James Riady

John Huang was another major figure convicted in the overall scandal. Born in 1945 in Nanping, Fujian, Huang and his father fled to Taiwan at the end of the Chinese Civil War before he eventually emigrated to the United States in 1969. A former employee of the Indonesian company Lippo Group's Lippo Bank and its owners Mochtar Riady and his son James (whom Huang first met along with Bill Clinton at a financial seminar in Little Rock, Arkansas, in 1980), Huang became a key fund-raiser within the DNC in 1995. While there, he raised $3.4 million for the party. Nearly half had to be returned when questions arose regarding their source during later investigations by Congress.

According to U.S. Secret Service logs, Huang visited the White House 78 times while working as a DNC fund-raiser. James Riady visited the White House 20 times (including six personal visits to President Clinton).

Immediately prior to joining the DNC, Huang worked in President Clinton's Commerce Department as deputy assistant secretary for international economic affairs. His position made him responsible for Asia-U.S. trade matters. He was appointed to the position by President Clinton in December 1993. His position at the Commerce Department gave him access to classified intelligence on China. While at the department, it was later learned, Huang met 9 times with Chinese embassy officials.

Huang eventually pleaded guilty to conspiring to reimburse Lippo Group employees' campaign contributions with corporate or foreign funds. James Riady was later convicted of campaign finance violations relating to the same scheme as well, and was sentenced to pay a large fine. Shortly after Riady pledged $1 million in support of then-Governor Clinton's campaign for the presidency, contributions made by Huang had been reimbursed with funds wired from a foreign Lippo Group entity into an account Riady maintained at Lippo Bank and then distributed to Huang in cash. Also, contributions made by Lippo Group entities operating in the United States were reimbursed with wire transfers from foreign Lippo Group entities.

An unclassified U.S. Senate Committee on Governmental Affairs report issued in 1998 stated that both James Riady and his father Mochtar had "had a long-term relationship with a Chinese intelligence agency." According to journalist Bob Woodward, details of the relationship came from highly classified intelligence information supplied to the committee by both the CIA and Federal Bureau of Investigation (FBI).

The most well-known of John Huang's fund-raisers involved Vice President Al Gore, Maria Hsia, and the Hsi Lai Buddhist Temple in California.

=== Maria Hsia ===
Taiwan-born Maria Hsia (pronounced "Shya"), a long time fund raiser for Al Gore, California immigration consultant, and business associate of John Huang and James Riady since 1988, facilitated $100,000 in illegal campaign contributions through her efforts at Hsi Lai Temple, a Chinese Buddhist temple associated with Taiwan in Hacienda Heights, California. This money went to the DNC, to the Clinton–Gore campaign, and to U.S. Representative Patrick Kennedy of Rhode Island. After a trial, Hsia was convicted in March 2000.

The Democratic National Committee eventually returned the money donated by the temple's monks and nuns. Twelve nuns and employees of the temple, including temple abbess Venerable Yi Kung (who resigned her post after being subpoenaed), refused to answer questions by pleading the Fifth Amendment when they were subpoenaed to testify before Congress. Two other Buddhist nuns admitted destroying lists of donors and other documents related to the controversy because they felt the information would embarrass the temple. A Temple-commissioned videotape of the fund raiser also went missing and the nuns' attorney claimed it may have been shipped off to Taiwan.

The temple event became particularly controversial because it was attended by Vice President Gore. In an interview on the January 24, 1997, edition of the Today show, Gore said:

I did not know that it was a fund-raiser. But I knew it was a political event, and I knew there were finance people that were going to be present, and so that alone should have told me, 'This is inappropriate and this is a mistake; don't do this.' And I take responsibility for that. It was a mistake.

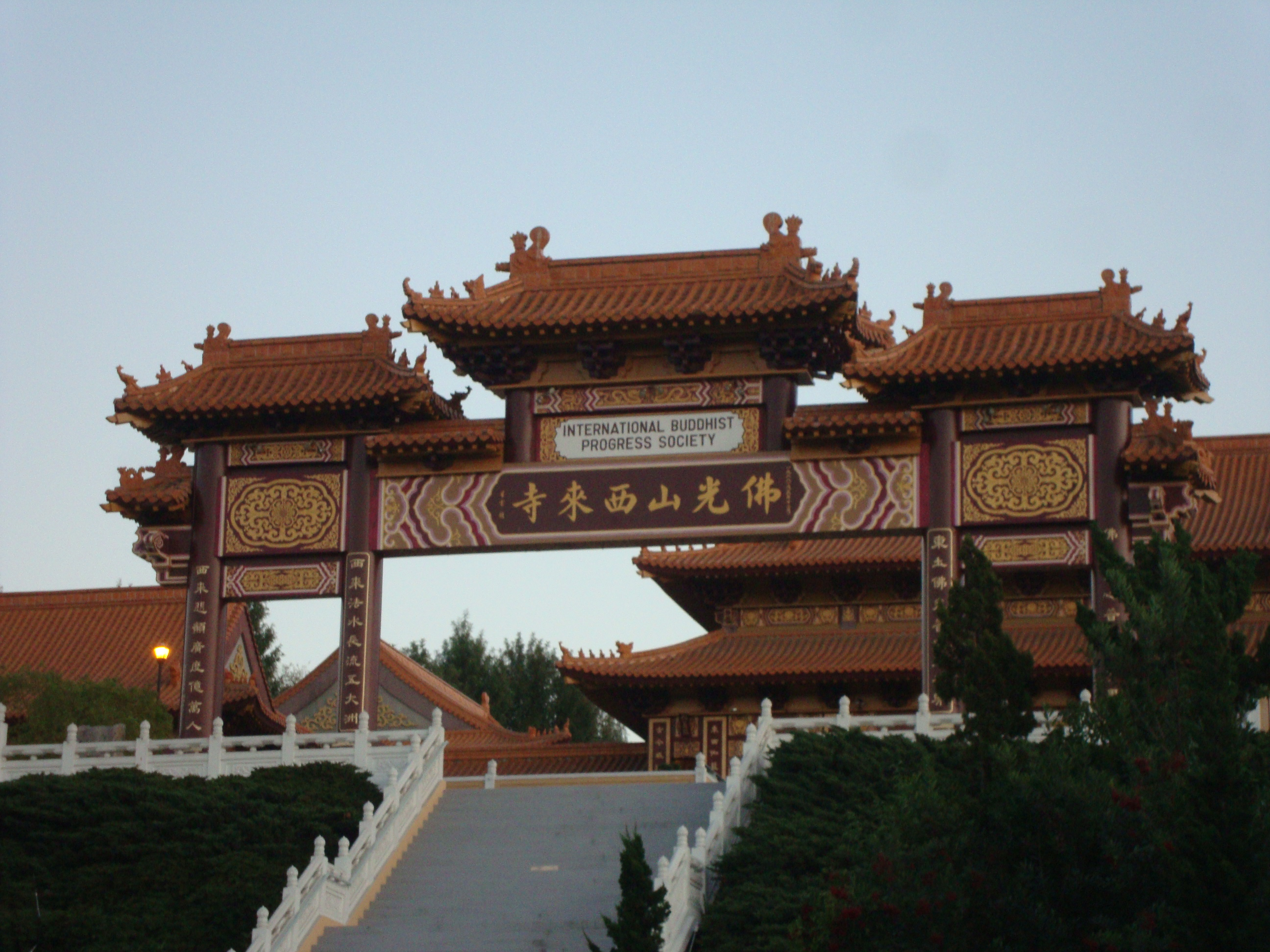
The Hsi Lai Temple in Hacienda Heights, California

In response, the U.S. Senate Governmental Affairs Committee that investigated the controversy said:

The Vice President's staff ... knew that the temple event was a fundraiser. In March 1996, Deputy Chief of Staff David Strauss had helped arrange a meeting in the White House with the founder of the temple, Hsing Yun—a meeting which Strauss believed would 'lead to a lot of $.' The White House staff repeatedly referred to the event as a 'fundraiser' in internal correspondence, and assigned to it a 'ticket price' of '1,000–5,000 [dollars per] head'.

John Huang's memo to Vice President Gore's assistant Kimberly Tilley specifically mentioned that the temple meeting was a fundraising event. Gore later acknowledged that he had known the visit was "finance-related."

In the U.S., religious organizations enjoy a tax exempt status. Political activity is prohibited for such tax exempt entities. The Senate Governmental Affairs Committee also said they learned that Hsia had served as an "agent" of the PRC government. Hsia denied the claim.

=== Ted Sioeng ===
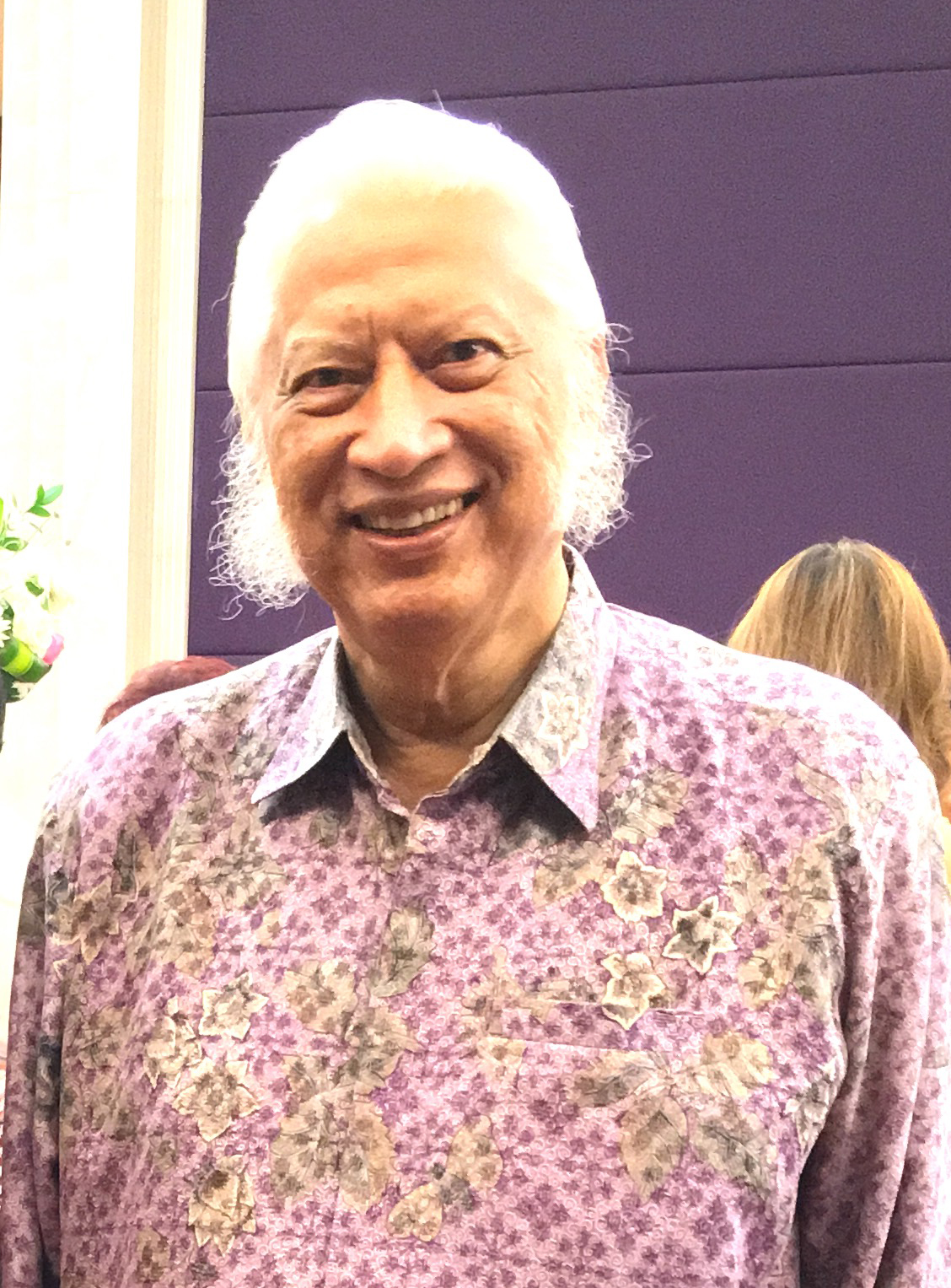
Ted Sioeng

Ted Sioeng, an Indonesian entrepreneur who donated money to both Democrats and Republicans, was the sixth individual whose donations were investigated by the Senate committee. Suspect contributions associated with Sioeng include $250,000 to the DNC and $100,000 to Republican California State Treasurer Matt Fong. Fong returned the money in April 1997.

Sieong sat with Bill Clinton or Al Gore at two fundraising events. Sioeng also joined Fong at a meeting with then Republican House Speaker Newt Gingrich in mid-1995. Gingrich called the meeting a "photo op". Gingrich was the guest of honor at a Sioeng-organized luncheon the day after a Sioeng family company gave the $50,000 think-tank donation, solicited by a Gingrich adviser.

Attorney General Janet Reno and the directors of the FBI, CIA and National Security Agency (NSA) told members of the Senate committee they had credible intelligence information indicating Sioeng acted on behalf of China. A spokesman for Sioeng denied the allegations. Sioeng left the country shortly thereafter, and no charges were filed.

=== Bernard Schwartz ===
Bernard L. Schwartz CEO of Loral Space & Communications, a satellite communications company, donated over $600,000 to the Democratic Party. Schwartz said he did not expect, need, or receive any special treatment from the Clinton administration as a result of his donations. In 1998 Loral was under investigation for illegally transferring satellite technology to China.

In February 1998 during the time Loral was under investigation, Loral requested Clinton to sign a waiver which would allow Loral to ship satellite technology to China. Clinton's justice department advised against signing the waiver because they believed that a jury wouldn't convict Loral if they received a waiver from Clinton. Clinton did eventually sign the waiver. The U.S space technology received by China may have furthered Beijing's military development of nuclear missiles. In 2002 Loral would later be fined $14 million for its involvement in illegally transferring classified secrets to China.

== Investigations ==
=== Department of Justice investigation ===
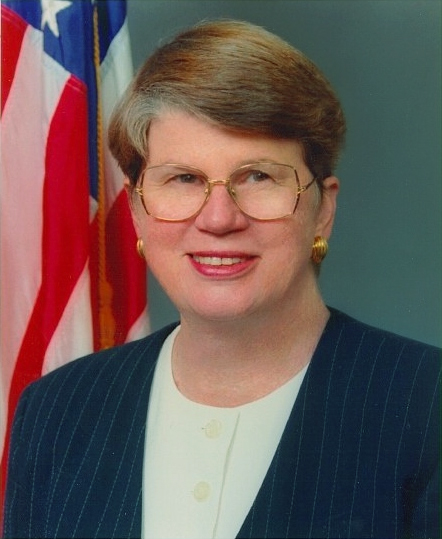
Attorney General Janet Reno

The Justice Department opened a task force in late 1996 to begin investigating allegations of campaign fundraising abuses by the Clinton/Gore re-election campaign. It expanded its internal investigation to include activities related to President Bill Clinton's legal defense fund in December 1996.

President Clinton announced in February 1997 that he thought there should be a "vigorous" and "thorough" investigation into reports that the People's Republic of China tried to direct financial contributions from overseas sources to the Democratic National Committee. The president stopped short of calling for an independent prosecutor, saying that was the decision of the Justice Department.

"[O]bviously it would be a very serious matter for the United States if any country were to attempt to funnel funds to one of our parties for any reason whatever," President Clinton said.

By July 1997, the administration determined that no evidence of any such thing had yet been proven.

"We have received the relevant [FBI] briefings," White House Press Secretary Mike McCurry said. "We believe there's no basis for any change in our policy toward China, which is one of engagement."

"I do not know whether it is true or not," President Clinton stated. "Therefore, since I don't know, it can't... and shouldn't affect the larger long-term strategic interests of the American people in our foreign policy."

Members of Congress of both parties reached disparate conclusions. According to The Washington Post, Senator Fred Thompson (a Republican from Tennessee) and chairman of the committee investigating the fundraising controversy, said he believed the Chinese plan targeted presidential and congressional elections while Democratic Senators Joe Lieberman and John Glenn said they believed the evidence showed the Chinese targeted only congressional elections.

=== Congressional investigations ===
With regard to their overall efficacy, investigators are on record as having stated that the Congressional investigations were hamstrung due to lack of co-operation of witnesses. Ninety-four people either refused to be questioned, pled the Fifth Amendment, or left the country altogether.

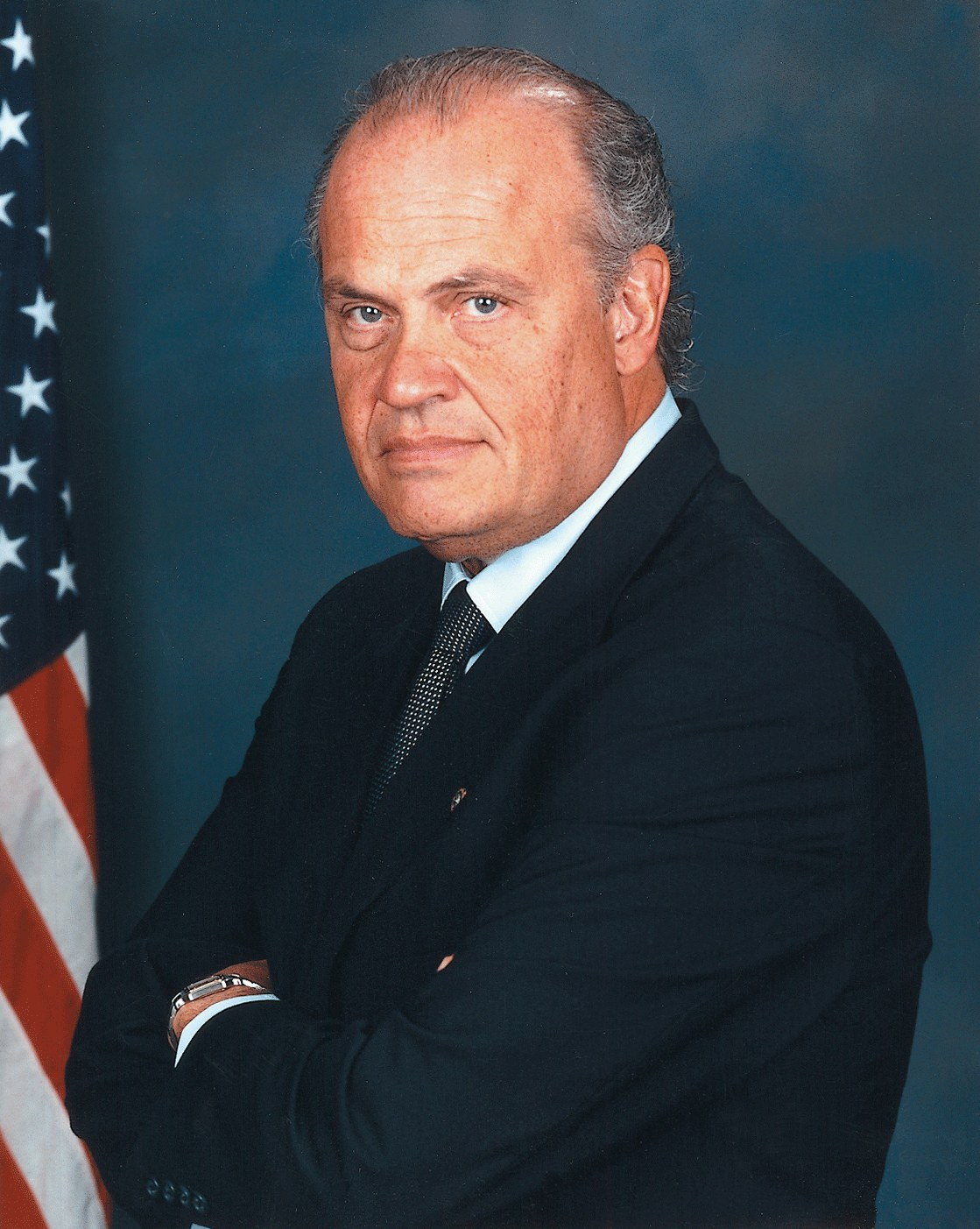
U.S. Sen. Fred Thompson (R-TN)

The U.S. Senate Committee on Governmental Affairs held public hearings into the campaign finance issues from July to October 1997. The Committee, chaired by Republican Fred Thompson, adopted a Republican-written final report (the Wikisource referenced and appearing herein) on a straight party-line vote, 8 in favor and 7 opposing, in March 1998. Thompson described the findings as "not any one real big thing" but "a lot of things strung together that paint a real ugly picture." The Democrats published a minority report dissenting with most of the conclusions of the final report, stating the evidence "does not support the conclusion that the China plan was aimed at, or affected, the 1996 presidential election." Considerable acrimony was displayed during the hearings between Thompson and the ranking minority member, Democrat John Glenn, with the public disagreements between the two leaders reaching a level seldom seen in recent years in Congressional committees.

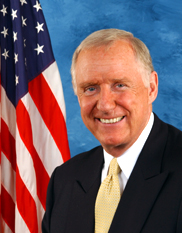
U.S. Rep. Dan Burton (R-IN)

A House investigation, headed by Indiana Republican Dan Burton focused on allegations of campaign finance abuse, including the contributions channeled through Chung, Huang, and Trie. The investigation was lengthy, spanning both the 105th and 106th Congresses, and according to a Democratic report had cost over $7.4 million as of August 31, 1998, making it the most expensive Congressional investigation ever (the Senate Watergate investigation cost $7 million in 1998 dollars).

Norman Ornstein, a Congressional expert at the American Enterprise Institute said in May 1998, "Barring some dramatic change, I think the Burton investigation is going to be remembered as a case study in how not to do a congressional investigation and as a prime example of investigation as farce." In a May 5, 1998, letter to other Republicans on the committee, Burton admitted that "mistakes and omissions were made" in tape transcripts released to the public of phone calls made by Webster Hubbell. A committee investigator who was an advocate of releasing the tapes resigned at Burton's request.

=== Calls for an independent counsel ===
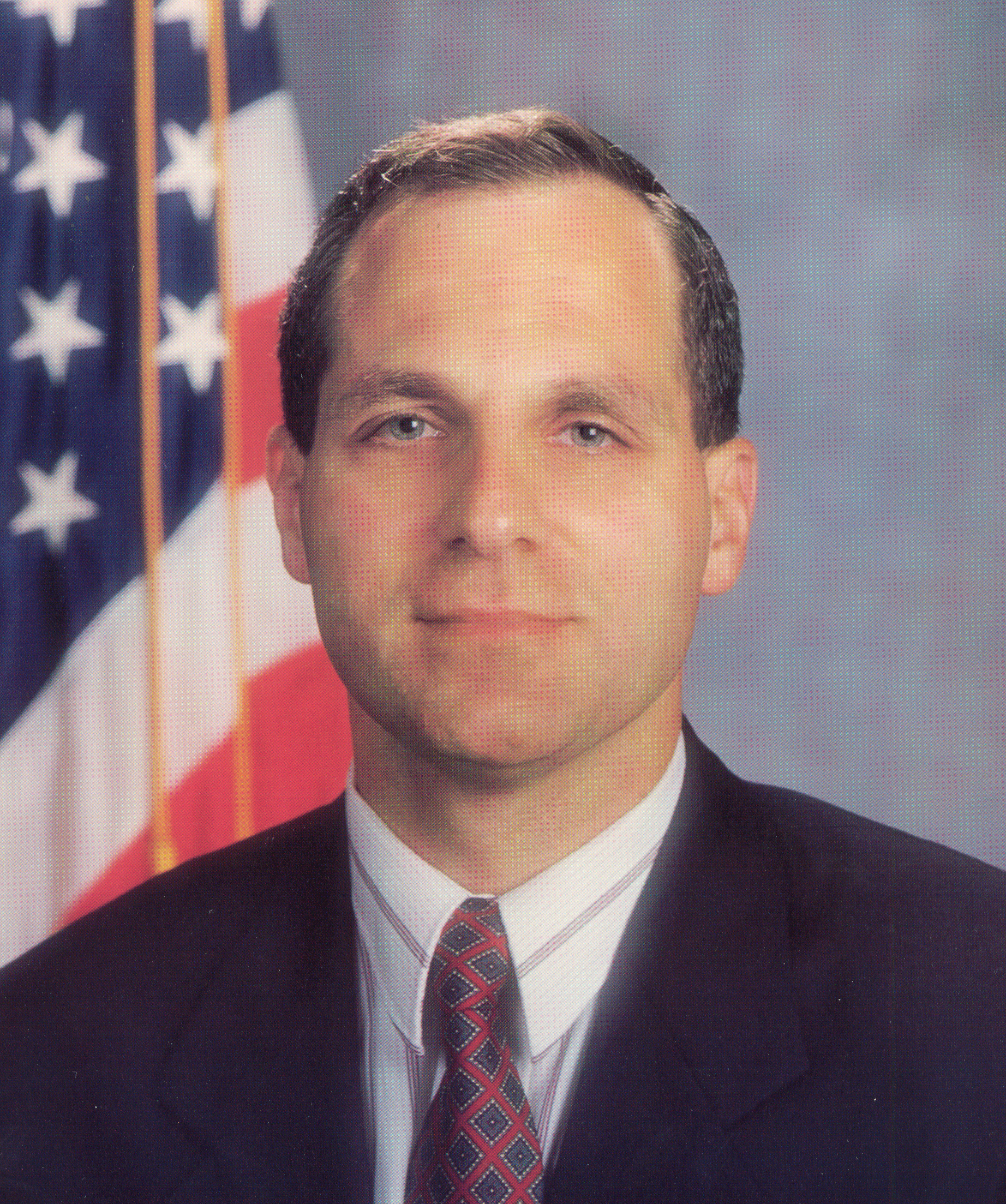
FBI Director Louis Freeh

President Clinton's FBI Director Louis Freeh wrote in a 22-page memorandum to then Clinton's critics called of the scandal, nicknamed "Chinagate." Attorney General Janet Reno said in November 1997 that "It is difficult to imagine a more compelling situation for appointing an independent counsel."

In July 1998, the Justice Department's campaign finance task force head, Charles La Bella, sent a report to Janet Reno also recommending she seek an independent counsel to investigate alleged fundraising abuses by Democratic party officials. The media reported that La Bella believed there was clearly an appearance of a conflict of interest by Reno.

Robert Conrad, Jr., who later became head of the task force, called on Reno in Spring 2000 to appoint an independent counsel to look into the fundraising practices of Vice President Gore.

Janet Reno declined all requests:

I try to do one thing: what's right. I am trying to follow the independent counsel statute as it has been framed by Congress. If you had a lower threshold, then any time somebody said 'boo' about a covered person, you'd trigger the independent counsel statute —Janet Reno, December 4, 1997.

A CNN/Time poll taken in May 1998 found 58 percent of Americans felt an independent counsel should have been appointed to investigate the controversy. Thirty-three percent were opposed. The same poll found that 47 percent of Americans believed a quid pro quo existed between the Clinton administration and the PRC government.

=== Calls for impeachment ===
In 1997 Bob Barr and eighteen other Republicans signed a resolution to impeach Bill Clinton for alleged campaign finance law violations and obstruction of congressional investigations. Anti Clinton activists collected 100,000 signatures supporting his impeachment.

=== Criticism of investigation ===
In addition to partisan complaints from Republicans, columnists Charles Krauthammer, William Safire, and Morton Kondracke, as well as a number of FBI agents, suggested the investigations into the fundraising controversies were willfully impeded.

FBI agent Ivian Smith wrote a letter to FBI Director Freeh that expressed "a lack of confidence" in the Justice Department's attorneys regarding the fundraising investigation. He wrote: "I am convinced the team at... [the Department of Justice] leading this investigation is, at best, simply not up to the task... The impression left is the emphasis on how not to prosecute matters, not how to aggressively conduct investigations leading to prosecutions." Smith and three other FBI agents later testified before Congress in late 1999 that Justice Department prosecutors impeded their inquiry. FBI agent Daniel Wehr told Congress that the first head U.S. attorney in the investigation, Laura Ingersoll, told the agents they should "not pursue any matter related to solicitation of funds for access to the president. The reason given was, 'That's the way the American political process works.' I was scandalized by that," Wehr said. The four FBI agents also said that Ingersoll prevented them from executing search warrants to stop destruction of evidence and micromanaged the case beyond all reason.

FBI agents were also denied the opportunity to ask President Clinton and Vice President Gore questions during Justice Department interviews in 1997 and 1998 and were only allowed to take notes. During the interviews, neither Clinton nor Gore were asked any questions about fund-raisers John Huang and James Riady, nor the Hsi Lai Buddhist Temple fundraising event led by Maria Hsia and attended by Huang and Ted Sioeng.

== See also ==
- 2019 Australian Parliament infiltration plot
- China–United States relations
- Chinese government interference in the 2019 and 2021 Canadian federal elections
- Citizens United v. FEC
- Christine Lee
- Follow the money
- Commerce Department trade mission controversy
- Lincoln Bedroom for contributors controversy
- China Lobby
- Campaign finance in the United States
- Campaign finance reform in the United States
- Frontline: "The Fixers", Season 15, Episode 6
- Legal dispute between former New Zealand Members of Parliament Simon Bridges and Jami-Lee Ross which stemmed from a donation to Bridges by Chinese businessman Yikun Zhang
