= Boeing T-43 =

U.S. Air Force navigator training aircraft

T-43/CT-43
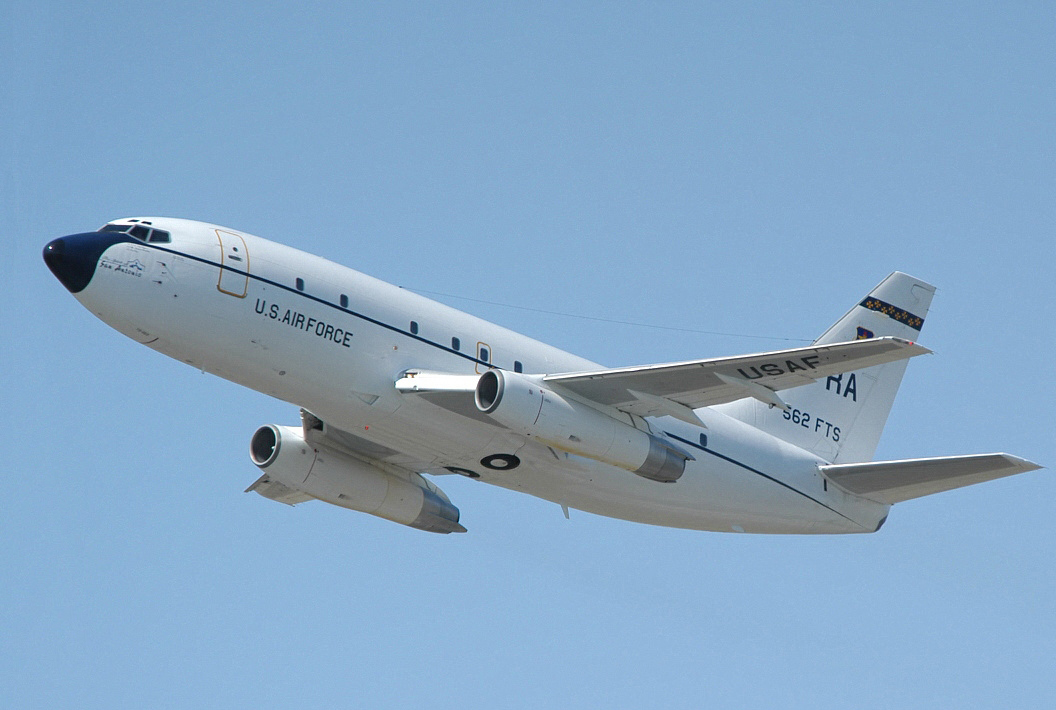
- T-43 taking off from Ottawa Macdonald-Cartier International Airport

General information
- Type: Multi-engine trainer / transport
- Manufacturer: Boeing
- Status: Retired
- Primary user: United States Air Force
- Number built: 19

History
- Introduction date: September 1973
- First flight: 10 March 1973
- Retired: September 2010
- Developed from: Boeing 737-200

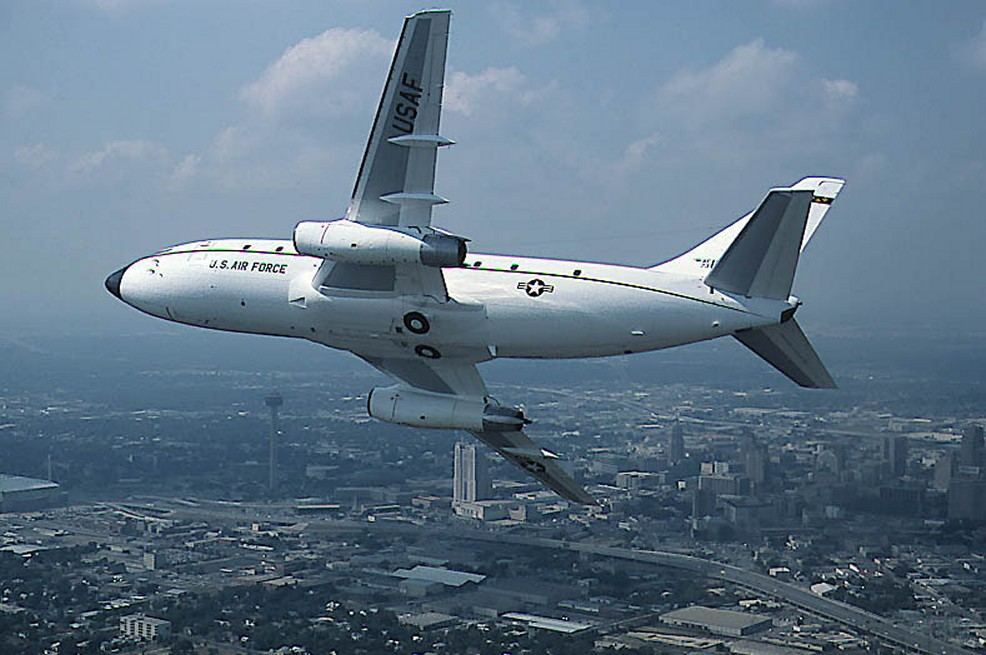
A T-43 in flight

The Boeing T-43 is a retired modified Boeing 737-200 that was used by the United States Air Force for training navigators, later called USAF combat systems officers, from 1973 to 2010. Informally referred to as the Gator (an abbreviation of "navigator") and "Flying Classroom", nineteen of these aircraft were delivered to the Air Training Command (ATC) at Mather Air Force Base, California during 1973 and 1974. Two additional aircraft were delivered to the Colorado Air National Guard at Buckley Air National Guard Base (later Buckley Space Force Base) and Peterson Air Force Base, Colorado, in direct support of cadet air navigation training at the nearby U.S. Air Force Academy. Two T-43s were later converted to CT-43As in the early 1990s and transferred to Air Mobility Command (AMC) and United States Air Forces in Europe (USAFE), respectively, as executive transports. A third aircraft was also transferred to Air Force Materiel Command (AFMC) for use as the "Rat 55" radar test bed aircraft and was redesignated as an NT-43A. The T-43A was retired by the Air Education and Training Command (AETC) in 2010 after 37 years of service.

== Design and development ==
On 27 May 1971, the United States Air Force (USAF) placed an order for 19 T-43s, modified versions of the Boeing 737-200 as a replacement for the USAF's aging fleet of Convair T-29 navigation trainers, as part of the Undergraduate Navigator Training System. The Boeing aircraft was selected in preference to a trainer based on the Douglas DC-9.

From its entry into service in 1974 until the mid-1990s, the T-43As were used for all USAF Undergraduate Navigator Training. Starting in the mid-1990s, the T-43As were used for USAF Undergraduate Navigator/Combat Systems Officer training with the exception of those USAF navigators/CSOs slated for the F-15E and B-1B.

In 1976, with the U.S. Navy's retirement of its T-29 aircraft and deactivation of its associated Training Squadron Twenty-Nine (VT-29) at NAS Corpus Christi, Texas, those student naval flight officers destined for land-based naval aircraft such as the P-3 Orion, including its EP-3 variant, and various versions of the C-130 in U.S. naval service, began training in USAF T-43s at Mather AFB under a program known by USAF as "Interservice Undergraduate Navigator Training" (IUNT) and by the U.S. Navy as the NAV pipeline for training student naval flight officers slated for eventual assignments to land-based naval aircraft.

Externally, the T-43A differs from the civilian Boeing 737-200 aircraft by having more antennas and fewer windows, and lacking the left aft and right forward cabin doors.

The T-43A has stations on board for twelve navigator students, six navigator instructors, as well as a pilot and co-pilot. The student training compartment was equipped with avionics gear as used in contemporary operational aircraft from the mid-1970s to the early 2000s. This included search and weather radar; VHF omnidirectional range (VOR) and tactical air navigation system (TACAN) avionics systems; a long range navigation system (LORAN-C); an inertial navigation system (INS); radar altimeter; and all required VHF, UHF and HF communications equipment. Five periscopic sextant stations spaced along the length of the training compartment were used for celestial navigation training. However, with the advent of the Global Positioning System (GPS), student navigators were no longer taught celestial navigation or LORAN.

The T-43A aircraft had considerably more training capability than the aircraft it replaced, the reciprocating-engine, propeller-driven T-29 Flying Classroom that was based on the Convair C-131 Samaritan. VT-29 had been training student naval flight officers for various land-based naval aircraft such as the P-3 Orion, EP-3 Aries, and variants of the Lockheed C-130 Hercules while the 323 FTW and its predecessor organizations at Mather AFB, the former Ellington AFB (now Ellington Field Joint Reserve Base, the former James Connally Air Force Base, and the former Harlingen Air Force Base had been training undergraduate navigators for all USAF aircraft with a navigator, weapon systems officer, and/or electronic warfare officer, ranging from bomber, cargo and air refueling aircraft such as the B-52 Stratofortress, C-130 Hercules and KC-135 Stratotanker, to fighter and reconnaissance aircraft that included the F-4C, F-4D, F-4E and RF-4C Phantom II, the F-111, and the RC-135 RIVET JOINT aircraft, as well as those recruited with previous experience in other aircraft to the SR-71.

Inside each T-43A training compartment were two minimum proficiency, two maximum proficiency and 12 student navigator stations. Two stations form a console, and instructors could move their seats to the consoles and sit beside students for individual instruction. The large cabin allows easy access to seating and storage, and reduced the distance between student stations and instructor positions.

The aircraft were initially assigned to the 323rd Flying Training Wing (323 FTW) of the Air Training Command (ATC) at Mather AFB, California, plus two additional aircraft assigned to the 140th Wing (140 WG) of the Colorado Air National Guard at Peterson AFB, Colorado, to support introductory air navigation training for cadets at the United States Air Force Academy. When the 323 FTW was inactivated and Mather AFB closed by Base Realignment and Closure (BRAC) action in 1993, most of the T-43s were transferred to the 12th Flying Training Wing (12 FTW) of the Air Education and Training Command (AETC) at Randolph AFB, Texas, with the 12 FTW assuming the specialized undergraduate navigator training (SUNT) role while the U.S. Navy's Training Air Wing SIX (TRAWING SIX), a Naval Air Training Command organization at NAS Pensacola, Florida, assumed a role for training those USAF student navigators slated for eventual assignment to the F-111, EF-111, F-15E Strike Eagle and B-1B Lancer.

== Operational history ==
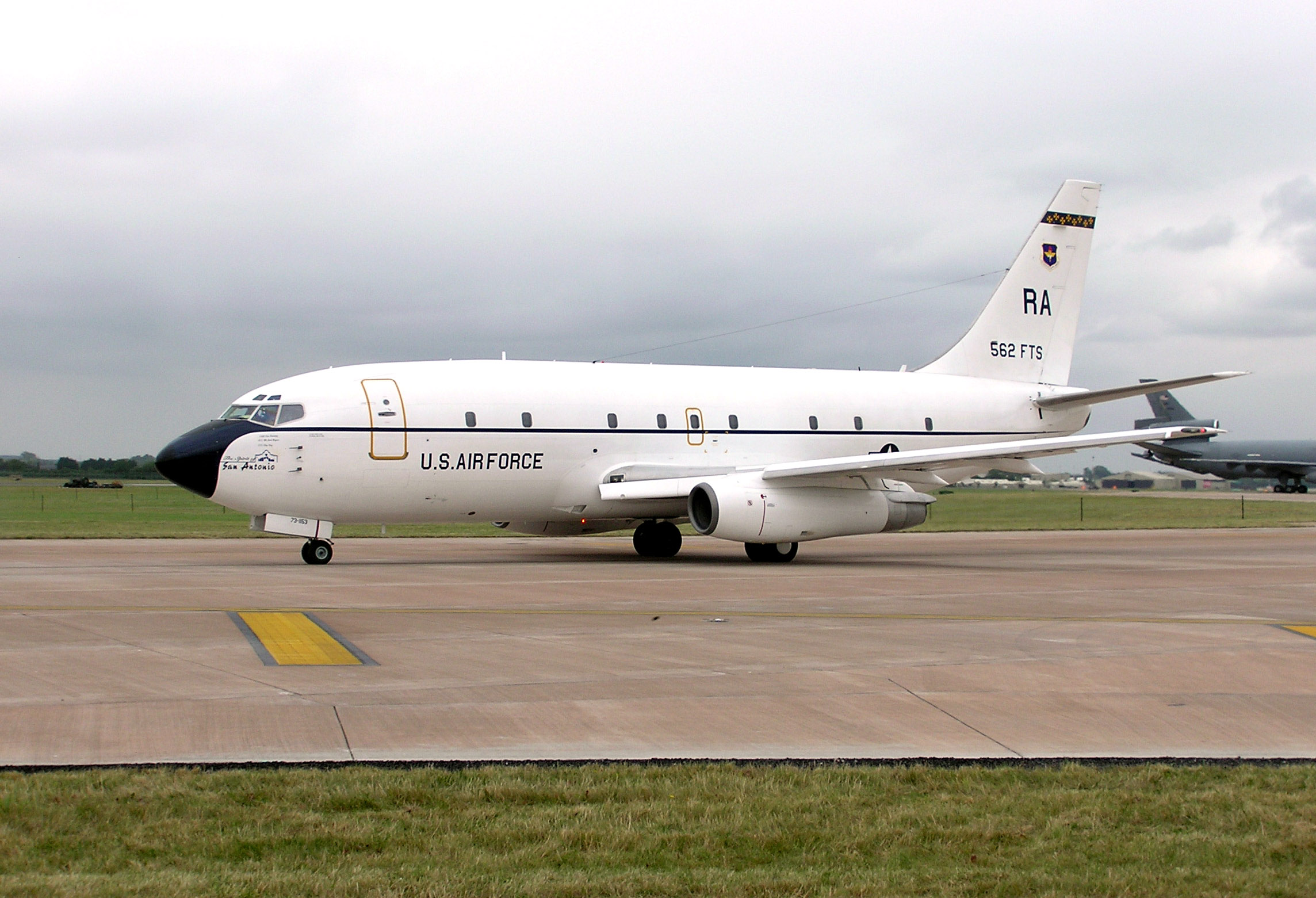
Boeing T-43A of the USAF 562nd Flying Training Squadron

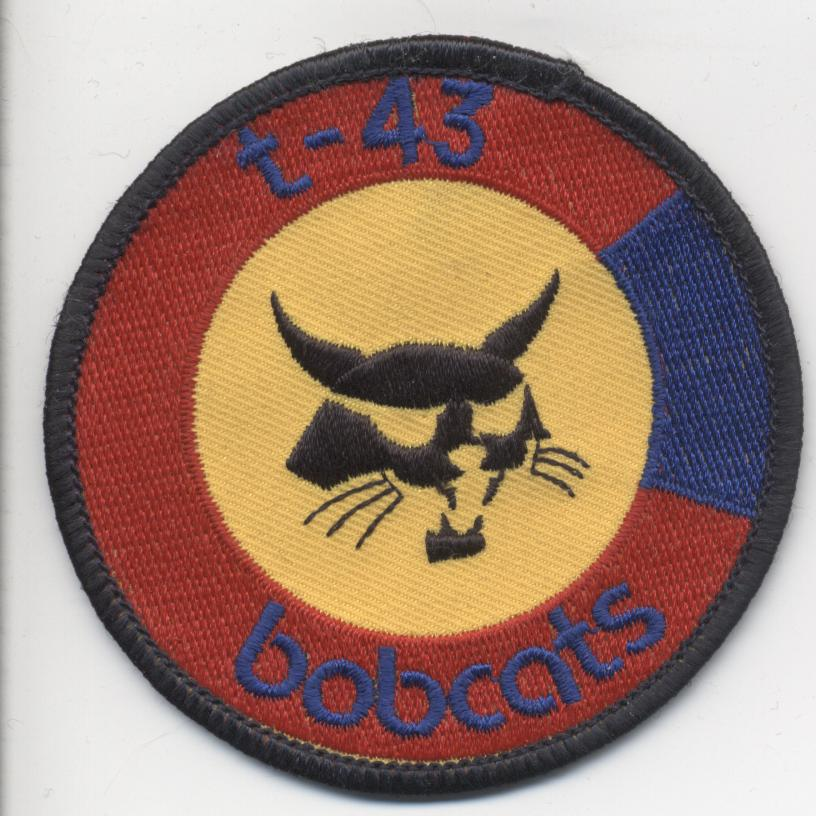
Colorado ANG T-43 "Bobcat" patch

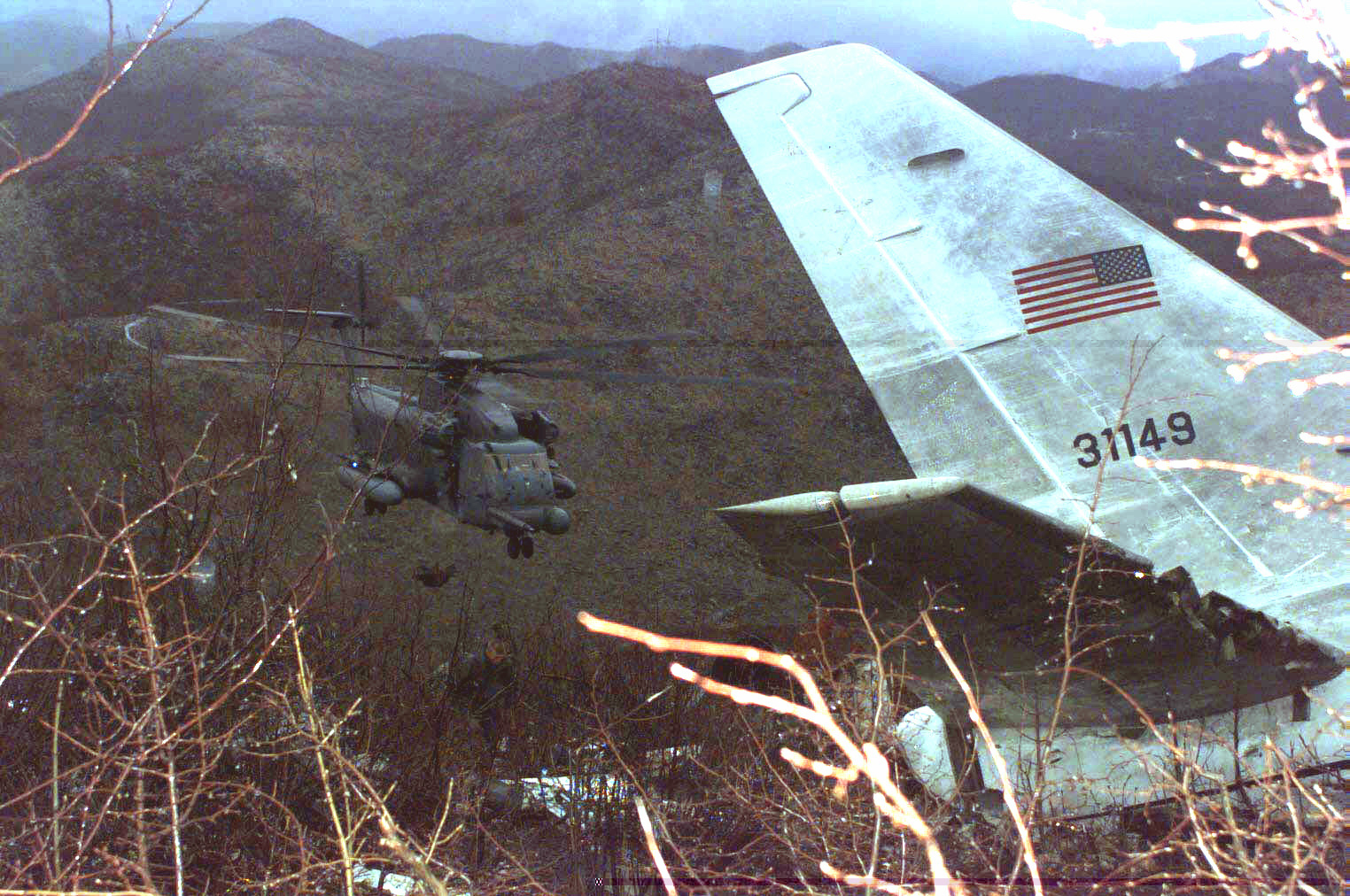
USAF MH-53J Pave Low helicopter near the wreckage of USAF CT-43A, AF Ser. No. 73-1149, in Croatia in 1996

The T-43 was last based at Randolph Air Force Base, Texas and operated originally by the 558th Flying Training Squadron (558 FTS) and from 1996 to 2010 by the 562d Flying Training Squadron and by the 563d Flying Training Squadron from 1999 to 2010. The two additional aircraft used for introductory air navigation training of USAF Academy cadets were operated by the 200th Airlift Squadron (200 AS), 140th Wing (140 WG), Colorado Air National Guard at then-Buckley Air Force Base and then-Peterson Air Force Base, Colorado until 1997. The 200 AS was inactivated in 2018.

In addition, as navigator training requirements were reduced when several USAF mission design series aircraft eliminated the navigator position, several T-43A aircraft had their navigator training systems removed and were modified to a transport aircraft configuration designated as CT-43A, such as one previously operated by the then-6th Air Mobility Wing (6 AMW) at MacDill AFB, Florida, in support of United States Southern Command (USSOUTHCOM) for transport of the USSOUTHCOM commander in Central and South America. The 6 AMW's CT-43A aircraft was replaced by a Gulfstream C-37A aircraft in early 2001.

Throughout its service in the ATC and the successor AETC, no T-43 was ever lost in a mishap. Among the T-43s removed from navigator training and converted to CT-43A executive transports, one aircraft assigned to the 86th Airlift Wing (86 AW) at Ramstein Air Base, Germany, to support United States European Command (USEUCOM) crashed in Croatia in 1996 while carrying U.S. Secretary of Commerce, Ron Brown, and 34 other passengers. There were no survivors and subsequent investigation determined that this was a controlled flight into terrain (CFIT) mishap as a result of pilot error.

On 17 September 2010, the last T-43A navigational training flight was flown at Randolph Air Force Base, and the aircraft was subsequently retired from the active Air Force service after 37 years of service. With the redesignation of USAF navigators as combat systems officers, the 12 FTW discontinued SUNT at Randolph AFB, the training of F-15E and B-1B navigators by the U.S. Navy at TRAWING SIX at NAS Pensacola was terminated, and a new Undergraduate Combat Systems Officer Training (UCSOT) flight training program was established with the 479th Flying Training Group (479 FTG), a geographically separated unit (GSU) of the 12 FTW based at NAS Pensacola, utilizing a combination of USAF T-6 Texan II and T-1 Jayhawk aircraft.

As of 2022, a single heavily modified NT-43A remains flying as a testbed aircraft in the Air Force Materiel Command (AFMC).

As of April of 2026, a single heavily modified NT-43 RAT 55 claimed to be in operation as a supporting role for the NASA Artemis II Lunar fly-by launch operation.

== Variants ==
T-43A
Model 737-253 powered by two JT8D-9 engines and provision for 3 instructors and 16 student navigators, 19 built.
CT-43A
T-43As converted as staff or command transports. Six T-43A were converted.
NT-43A
One T-43A, AF Ser. No. 73-1155, converted as a radar test bed aircraft. Used to test the radar-absorbing qualities of stealth aircraft.

== Operators ==
United States

- United States Air Force

== Aircraft on display ==
- 73-1150 – T-43A preserved at George Bush Intercontinental Airport in Houston, Texas, for tactical and anti-terror training purposes.
- 73-1153 The Spirit of San Antonio – T-43A on static display at Randolph Air Force Base in Universal City, Texas.

== Specifications (T-43A) ==
Data from Encyclopedia of World Military Aircraft

General characteristics

- Crew: 2
- Capacity: 19
- Length: 100 ft (30 m)
- Wingspan: 93 ft (28 m)
- Height: 37 ft (11 m)
- Wing area: 980 sq ft (91 m^{2})
- Airfoil: root: BAC 449/450/451; tip: BAC 442
- Empty weight: 60,210 lb (27,311 kg)
- Max takeoff weight: 115,000 lb (52,163 kg)
- Fuel capacity: 5,950 US gal (4,960 imp gal; 22,530 L)
- Powerplant: 2 × Pratt & Whitney JT8D-9A turbofan engines, 14,500 lbf (64.4 kN) thrust each

Performance

- Maximum speed: 509 kn (586 mph, 943 km/h) at 23,500 ft (7,200 m)
- Cruise speed: 500 kn (580 mph, 930 km/h)
- Never exceed speed: 545 kn (627 mph, 1,009 km/h)
- Range: 2,600 nmi (3,000 mi, 4,800 km)
- Endurance: 6 hours
- Rate of climb: 3,760 ft/min (19.1 m/s)

== See also ==
Related development

- Boeing 737
- Boeing C-40 Clipper

Aircraft of comparable role, configuration, and era

- McDonnell Douglas C-9

Related lists

- List of active United States military aircraft
- List of military aircraft of the United States
