= Oliver August =

German journalist

Oliver August is the founder of Continent Rising, the media, community and data company serving Africa's green economy. It has more than 100,000 subscribers and runs 10 free-to-use platforms focused on renewable energy, circular economy, conservation, healthcare, green jobs, green hydrogen and electric mobility. It also operates The Climate Network, which convenes more than 2,000 experts at community events to connect African professionals and generate opportunities around sustainability. The company says its mission is to "put the best Africa-specific green business ideas into the hands of investors, executives, vendors, operators, consumers, job-seekers, officials and civil society."

August was previously the Chief Technology and Innovation Officer at Nation Media Group, one of the largest content companies in Africa. August was also the CEO of Mawingu Networks, a data connectivity company is backed by Microsoft and serving rural Africans, as well as product lead at HelloFresh in London and an entrepreneur-in-residence at Viaplay in Stockholm. August came to the tech sector after an MBA and a career in news media. He was the Africa and Europe editor of The Economist, responsible for managing teams of writers, analysts and designers. He has also worked as a journalist in America and Asia. He was a staff correspondent based in Baghdad, Beijing, Beirut, Damascus, Nairobi, New York and Singapore.

August started his career at The Times of London. He covered financial markets in America, Europe and Asia, and worked as a war correspondent in Bosnia, Afghanistan and Iraq. His writing on Germany in 1998 won him the Anglo-German Foundation Journalism Prize. In 2012 August was named "Journalist of the year" at the Diageo Africa Business Reporting Awards.

August's first book, Along the Wall and Watchtowers (HarperCollins, 1999), chronicles a journey along the former Iron Curtain and examines the political, economic and social consequences of German reunification. His second book, Inside the Red Mansion (Houghton Mifflin & John Murray, 2007) describes the epic search for Lai Changxing, China's most wanted man, and details the emergence of an entrepreneurial class in post-Communist China. The book was translated into eleven languages.

August grew up in Canada and Germany. His father was a theatre director and his mother an architect. He has a bachelor's degree in philosophy, politics and economics from Oxford University, a master's degree in journalism and international relations from City University, London, a certificate in Mandarin Chinese from the School of Oriental and African Studies (SOAS) in London, and an MBA from the Saïd Business School at Oxford University.

August has appeared on the BBC, NPR, CNN and CNBC. He has contributed opinion articles to the Los Angeles Times, the Wall Street Journal, and the Washington Post.

== Books ==
- Along the Wall and Watchtowers, HarperCollins, 1999
- Inside the Red Mansion, Houghton Mifflin, 2007
