= 1996 United States Air Force Boeing T-43 crash =

1996 aviation accident in Croatia

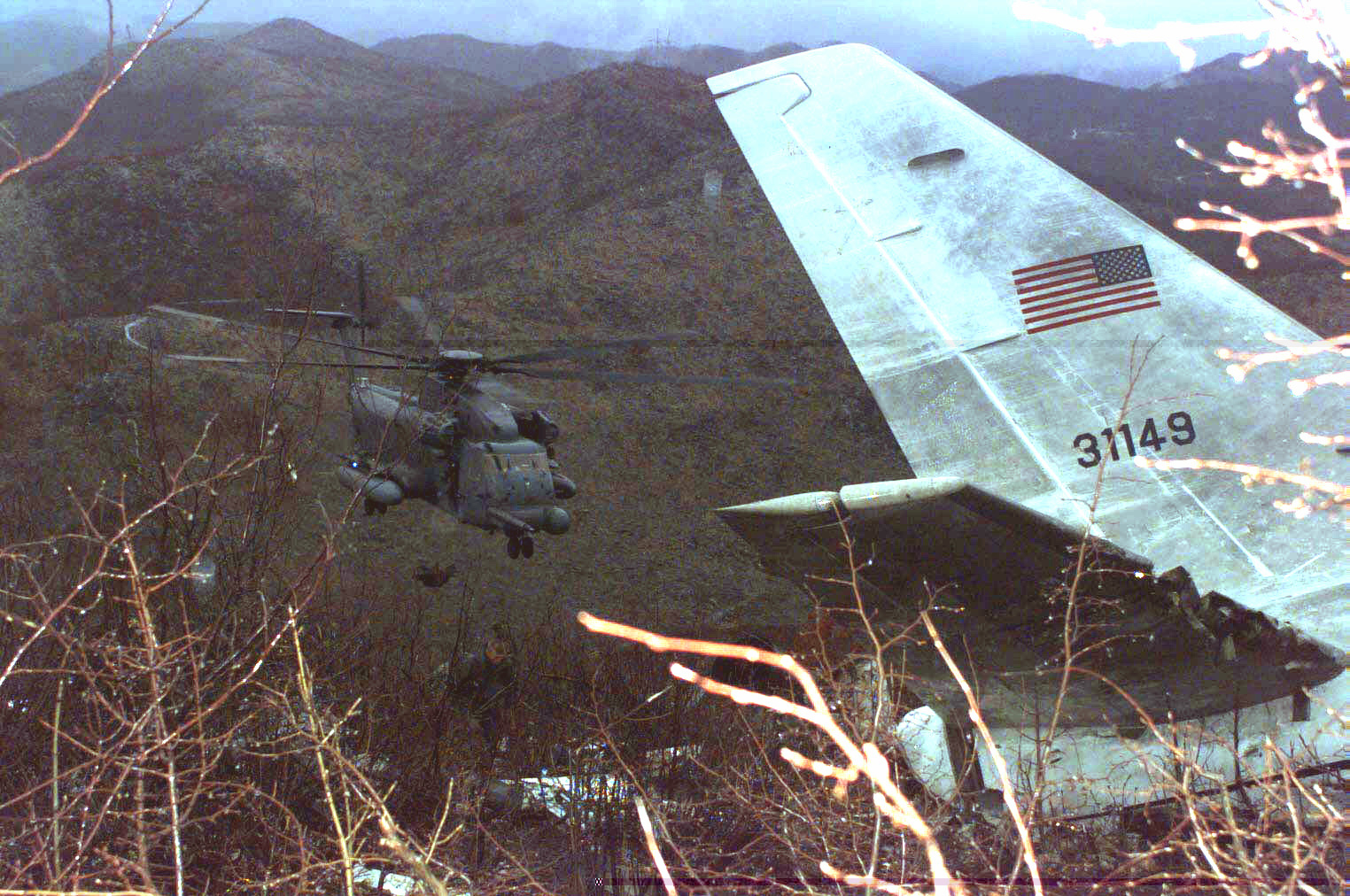
- A USAF MH-53J Pave Low next to the aircraft's tail section

Accident
- Date: 3 April 1996
- Summary: Controlled flight into terrain in inclement weather due to pilot error
- Site: 3 km (1.9 mi) north of Dubrovnik Airport, Dubrovnik, Croatia; 42°35′54″N 18°15′08″E

Aircraft
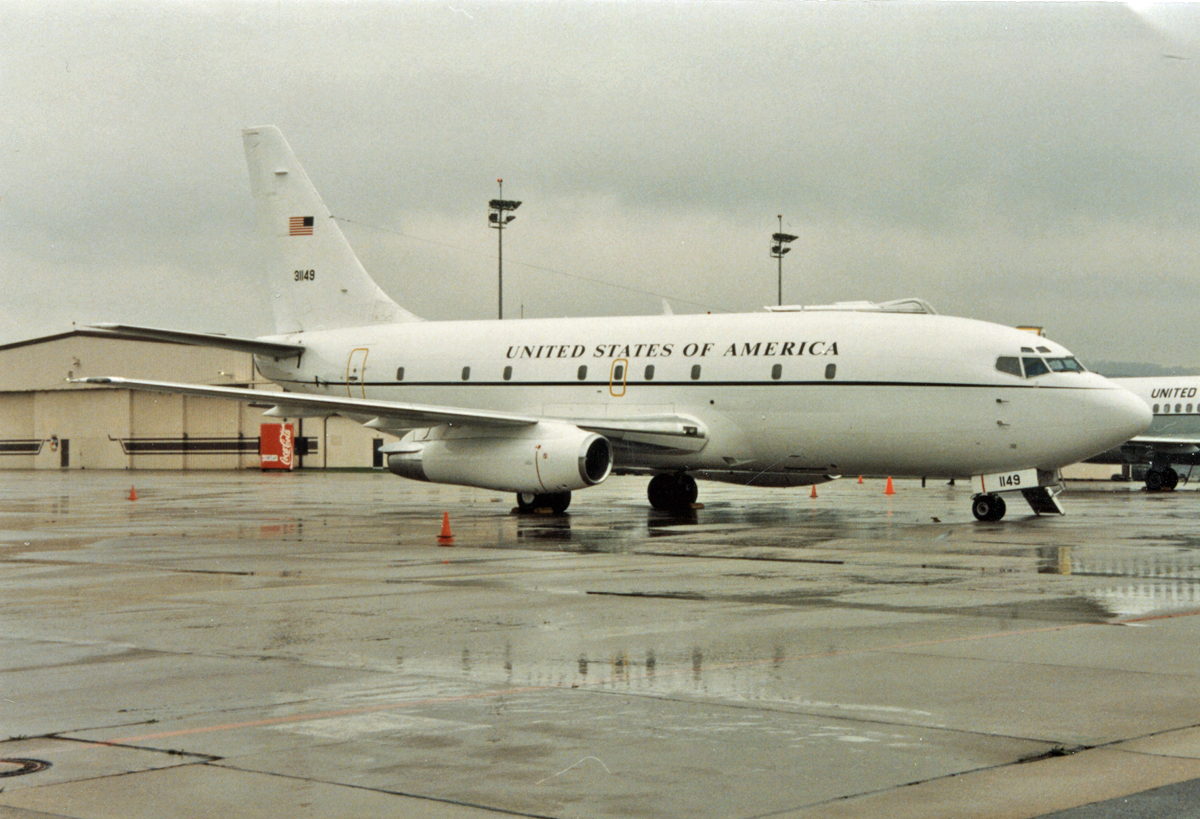
- 73-1149, the aircraft involved in the accident, seen in 1993
- Aircraft type: Boeing CT-43A
- Operator: United States Air Force
- Call sign: IFO21
- Registration: 73-1149
- Flight origin: Zagreb International Airport, Zagreb, Croatia
- Stopover: Tuzla International Airport, Tuzla, Bosnia and Herzegovina
- Destination: Dubrovnik Airport, Dubrovnik, Croatia
- Occupants: 35
- Passengers: 30
- Crew: 5
- Fatalities: 35
- Survivors: 0

On 3 April 1996, United States Air Force Flight IFO-21, operated by a Boeing T-43, crashed on approach to Dubrovnik, Croatia, while on an official trade mission. The aircraft, a Boeing 737-200 originally built as a T-43A navigational trainer and later converted into a CT-43A executive transport aircraft, was carrying United States Secretary of Commerce Ron Brown and 34 other people, including corporate CEOs.

While attempting an instrument approach to Dubrovnik Airport, the airplane crashed into a mountainside. All aboard died in the crash except one initial sole survivor, Shelly Kelly, who died en route to a hospital.

The aircraft was operated by the 76th Airlift Squadron of the 86th Airlift Wing, based at Ramstein Air Base in Germany. Unlike commercial 737s, the military CT-43A version was equipped with neither a flight data recorder nor a cockpit voice recorder.

== Investigation ==
The location of the crash site and departure and destination airports

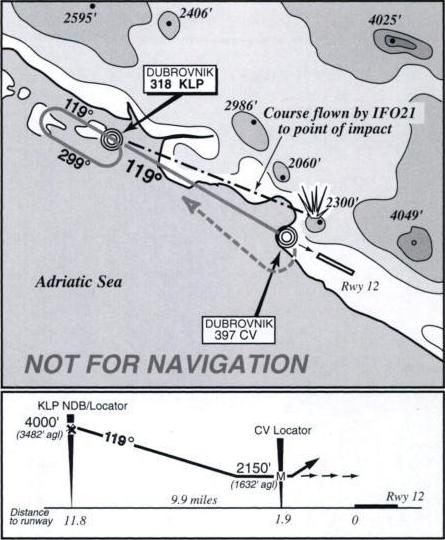
Summary of the NDB approach to runway 12 from the USAF accident report

The official US Air Force accident investigation board report noted several reasons that led the Boeing CT-43A, callsign "IFO-21" (short for Implementation Force), to crash. Chief among the findings was a "failure of command, aircrew error and an improperly designed instrument approach procedure".

The Boeing CT-43A used for this flight was formerly a T-43A navigator training aircraft that was converted for distinguished visitor travel. The flight was on an instrument flight rules non-directional beacon (NDB) approach, which is a non-precision type of instrument approach, to Runway 12 when it strayed off course. Non-precision approaches are those that do not incorporate vertical guidance. While NDB approaches are essentially obsolete in the United States, they are still used widely in other parts of the world.

Because of their infrequent use in the United States, many American pilots are not fully proficient in performing them. A NASA survey showed that 60% of American transport-rated pilots had not flown an NDB approach in the last year. The investigation board determined that the approach used was not approved for Department of Defense aircraft, and should not have been used by the aircraft crew. The board determined that the particular NDB approach used required two operating ADFs, the instrument used to fly such an approach, on board the aircraft, but this aircraft only had one ADF installed.

To successfully fly the approach, one ADF was required to track the outbound course of 119° from the Koločep NDB (KLP), while another ADF was required to observe when the aircraft had flown beyond the Cavtat NDB (CV), which marked the missed approach point. The board noted that the approach was rushed. The aircraft passed the final approach fix at 80 knots (150 km/h) above the proper approach speed and had not received the proper clearance from the control tower to initiate the approach.

The crash site, on a 2,300-foot (700 m) hill, was 1.6 miles (2.6 km) northeast of where the aircraft should have been on the inbound course to the NDB. The published NDB approach brings the inbound aircraft down a valley, and has a minimum descent height of 2,150 ft (660 m) at the missed approach point (where they should have climbed and turned to the right if the runway was not in view), which is below the elevation of the hills to the north. The runway is at 510 ft (160 m) above sea level.

Five other aircraft had landed prior to the CT-43A and had not experienced any problems with the navigational aids. No emergency call from the pilots occurred, and they did not initiate a missed approach, though they were beyond the missed approach point when they hit the hill at 2:57 pm local time.

Each country is responsible for publishing the approach charts, including minimum descent heights, for its airports, and the investigators noted that the minimum in mountainous terrain in the United States is 2,800 ft (850 m), as compared to the 2,150 ft (660 m) on the chart given to the crew of IFO-21. It was a requirement of the US Air Force to review and approve all charts, and to ban flights into airports for which the charts did not meet American aviation standards. The commander of the 86th Operations Group, Col. John E. Mazurowski, revealed that he had requested (but not yet received) approval to waive the review for Dubrovnik, as the approach had worked for years, and the delay of a full review could hamper the interests of the American diplomatic mission.

== Victims ==
Thirty-five people—six military crewmembers and twenty-nine civilians—died in the crash or from their injuries. Technical Sergeant Shelly Ann Kelly, who survived the initial accident, died later that night while being transported to the hospital. Thirty-three of the victims were Americans. Two were Croatians. Twelve Department of Commerce officials, including Secretary Brown, were among the deceased.

=== Government officials ===
- Ron Brown, Secretary of Commerce
- Duane Christian, security officer to the Secretary of Commerce
- Adam Darling, confidential assistant to the Secretary of Commerce
- Gail Dobert, Deputy Director for the Office of Business Liaison
- Carol Hamilton, Press Secretary to the Secretary of Commerce
- Kathryn Hoffman, senior advisor for strategic scheduling and special initiatives to the Secretary of Commerce
- Steve Kaminski, Counselor to the Secretary of Commerce
- Kathy Kellogg, Office of Business Liaison official
- Charles Meissner, Assistant Secretary of Commerce for international trade
- William Morton, Deputy Assistant Secretary of Commerce for international economic development
- Lawrence Payne, Foreign Service officer
- Naomi Warbasse, international trade specialist with the Department of Commerce

=== Businessmen ===
- Barry L. Conrad, chairman and CEO of Barrington Group
- Paul Cushman III, chairman and CEO of Riggs International Banking Corp.
- Robert E. Donovan, president and CEO of ABB Inc.
- Claudio Elia, chairman and CEO of Air & Water Technologies Corp.
- David Ford, president and CEO of InterGuard Corp. of Guardian International
- Frank Maier, president of Enserch International Ltd
- Walter Murphy, senior vice president of AT&T Submarine Systems Inc.
- Leonard Pieroni, chairman and CEO of Parsons Corp.
- John A. Scoville, chairman of Harza Engineering Co.
- Donald Terner, president of Bridge Housing Corp.
- Stuart Tholan, high-ranking Bechtel executive
- Robert A. Whittaker, chairman and CEO of Foster Wheeler Energy International

=== Flight crew ===
- Captain Ashley Davis, pilot
- Captain Tim Shafer, pilot
- Staff Sergeant Gerald Aldrich, flight mechanic
- Technical Sergeant Cheryl Turnege, steward
- Technical Sergeant Shelly Ann Kelly, steward
- Staff Sergeant Robert Farrington Jr., steward

=== Croatian victims ===
- Dragica Lendić Bebek, interpreter
- Nikša Antonini, photographer

The pilot was Captain Ashley "AJ" Davis, aged 35, employed by the U.S. Air Force since 1989, who had qualified to fly the Boeing CT-43 in 1992 and accumulated 2,942 flight hours in his career, with 582 hours on the Boeing CT-43. Co-pilot Captain Timothy Shafer, aged 33, was employed by the U.S. Air Force since 1988, with 2,835 flight hours, of which 1,676 hours were on the Boeing CT-43.

Both Croatian victims, Dragica Lendić Bebek and Nikša Antonini, were also distantly related, sixth cousins once removed. However, given the remoteness of that connection, it is highly unlikely that either was aware of their familial link at the time.

== Outcomes ==
Dubrovnik Airport was singled out for an improperly designed approach and landing procedure.

A number of US Air Force (USAF) officers were found to have contributed to a failure of command. The general commanding the 86th Airlift Wing, Brig. Gen. William E. Stevens, vice-commander Col. Roger W. Hansen, and the commander of the 86th Operations Group, Col. John E. Mazurowski, were all relieved of their posts. Mazurowski was later found guilty of a dereliction of duties and was demoted to major. 12 other officers were reprimanded.

The USAF ordered all military aircraft to be equipped with a flight data recorder and a cockpit voice recorder.

American military aircraft are no longer allowed to fly into airports without explicit approval from the United States Department of Defense, not even for high-ranking diplomatic missions.

== Legacy ==
The area of the crash site is identified by a large stainless steel cross on Stražišće peak. Hikers can reach the peak via the "Ronald Brown Path", which is named in commemoration of the U.S. Secretary of Commerce who died in the crash.

A memorial room has been installed in the Ronald Brown memorial house in the old city of Dubrovnik. It features portraits of the crash victims as well as a guest book.

The head of navigation at Dubrovnik Airport, Niko (Nino) Jerkuić, was found dead three days after the accident with a bullet wound to his chest. The police investigation concluded that the case was a suicide.

== In popular culture ==
In 2007, the crash of IFO-21 was the subject of "Fog of War", an episode from the fourth season of the internationally syndicated Canadian TV documentary series Mayday, repackaged as Air Disasters, for which it was season 7, episode 8, first broadcast on September 25, 2016.

Folksinger Anne Feeney's song CEOs (The Plane Wreck At Tuzla) on her 2000 album Have You Been to Jail for Justice? commemorates the crash of IFO-21, with a new set of words to Woody Guthrie's song Deportee (Plane Wreck at Los Gatos).
