= Lai Changxing =

Chinese businessman (born 1958)

- Born: September 15, 1958 (age 68); Jinjiang, Fujian, China
- Occupations: Businessman, smuggler
- Criminal charge: Bribery
- Criminal penalty: Life imprisonment
- Spouse: (divorced)
- Children: 3

Chinese name
- Traditional Chinese: 賴昌星
- Simplified Chinese: 赖昌星
Transcriptions
Standard Mandarin
- Hanyu Pinyin: Lài Chāngxīng
Southern Min
- Hokkien POJ: Lōa Chhiong-seng

Lai Changxing (born September 15, 1958) is a Chinese businessman known as the kingpin of one of China's largest economic crime cases. In 1994, he founded the Yuanhua Group, based in the Xiamen Special Economic Zone, which imported goods including cars and cigarettes and, at one point, accounted for one-sixth of China's oil imports. Through an extensive network of corrupt ties with government officials, Lai's operations allegedly evaded RMB 23 billion (US$3.6 billion) in customs duties. Facing an investigation, Lai fled to Canada in 1999, while many his associates were tried and executed. Following a 12-year legal battle over his extradition and diplomatic negotiations, Lai was deported to China on July 22, 2011. He was sentenced to life imprisonment in 2012.

== Early years ==
Lai was the eldest child born to Lai Yongdeng and Wang Zhuzhi in Jinjiang, Fujian province in 1958, the year the Great Leap Forward began. He was the first of eight children. He grew up in Shaocuo village (烧厝村). He would have starved to death during the Great China famine but luckily in Jinjiang and the rest of south-eastern Fujian the situation was greatly milder due to massive overseas Chinese donations and better leadership (unlike Tingzhou where about 100,000 Hakkas starved to death due to the Great Famine), his family also survived because his father converted a swamp into a personal vegetable field during the most difficult years. Lai received almost no formal education as he spent one year in school before the Cultural Revolution shut his school down. According to some sources Lai received three years of education.

== Career ==
=== Factory worker ===
When Lai was age 18, Mao Zedong died and private businesses began re-appearing across China under Deng Xiaoping. Lai began working at a farming machinery factory before it shut down. At age 20 Lai started a business making simple car parts. The business took off and turned into an empire. Within a decade he was the country's biggest private car importer.

=== TV business ===
In 1990 Lai tried to run a business to import duty-free TVs, where he made thousands. Two government officials from Shaocuo demanded fees be paid to them. When Lai refused, the two officials went to his house. At the time Lai was not home, but his sister was. The officials asked for business accounts, but she refused to give in. She was then beaten severely and sent to the hospital. The officials then started a tax fraud case. Lai would win in court, but his revenge campaign against Communist officials would tie up his businesses. Lai left Shaocuo and from this point on.

=== Yuanhua group ===
In 1994 Lai founded Fairwell Group, also known as Yuanhua Group (远华集团有限公司), a prominent group of upstart companies that took advantage of the economic boom of Xiamen's status as a Special Economic Zone. The group was heavily involved in the importing/smuggling of cars, cigarettes and oil. The group invested heavily in the city's real estate, hotels, clubs, roads and other infrastructure. Lai also has his own brand of Fairwell cigarettes.

In the mid-1990s Xiamen no longer regulated maximum building heights. Many rich businessmen tried to build the tallest skyscrapers. Lai built the 88-floor Yuanhua tower and the Yuanhua International Centre with a groundbreaking ceremony attended by 2000 guests. Each guest received a 3000-yuan red envelope. Lai had prominent connections with the Fujian power elite; he was also a member of the Provincial Consultative Conference.

Lai was believed to be the mastermind of a US$10 billion scheme, during which he allegedly bribed high level officials in the administration of the Xiamen Special Economic Zone in order to smuggle luxury cars and entire tanker-loads of oil into the country. The smuggling ring fraudulently avoided US$3.6 billion in taxes and fees. Chinese authorities do not comment on allegations that Lai's Yuanhua group was also a conduit for clandestine military shipments, such as Silkworm missiles.

In 1996 Xiamen airport's terminal building 2, funded by Lai, was one of the biggest airport structures in the country. In 1997 Xiamen's party secretary even made him an honorary citizen (厦门荣誉市民). In 1998 he spent two million yuan to purchase a football team based in Foshan, Guangzhou and disbanded the team. He then moved all the players to Xiamen to create the Xiamen Lanshi F.C., and helped the team promote to the Chinese Super League. He even made his own film starring himself as a football star to improve his image.

He built a 7-story building called the Red Mansion (红楼), named after the classical story Dream of a Red Mansion. The mansion hired girls that were at least 5 ft 6 inches tall and have a highschool diploma at a salary of US$1000 a month. The girls were offered as sex mistresses and prostitutes to government officials.

Lai had his own Forbidden City replica (远华影视城) built with US$20 million that acts as a film production studio. He typically drove sedans. His armoured Mercedes was formerly owned by Party General Secretary Jiang Zemin.

== Relationships with officials and celebrities ==
According to Oliver August's book Inside the Red Mansion, Lai is known to be financially linked with high-ranking Chinese officials and celebrities. Some of the people include Ji Shengde, major general of military intelligence for the People's Liberation Army. Ji Shengde is the son of former Secretary General of the State Council Ji Pengfei.

August alleged that singer Dong Wenhua was offered 10 million yuan if she took her clothes off for Lai, who was drunk at the time. She purportedly did take off her clothes for the money, and disappeared from public view. She returned to state-run television after 3 years. Others include Li Jizhou (李纪周), deputy minister for public security and Xu Ganlu (许甘露), Immigration secretary. Other corrupt officials include Liu Feng (刘丰), Zhuang Rushun (庄如顺), Lan Fu (蓝甫), Yang Qianxian (杨前线), Shi Zhaobin (石兆彬), and Zhao Keming (赵克明). Some of them have already received sentences.

Lai's corruption of what was said to be literally hundreds of Chinese officials was effected through paying millions of dollars in bribes, by hosting lavish banquets and by giving jobs to relatives of local bureaucrats. He also blackmailed officials, through filming them with prostitutes arranged by him. Such arrangements enabled his companies to receive illicit import licenses and to avoid billions of dollars in import taxes. Lai's level of corruption of officials was to such a degree that corrupted naval officers allegedly ordered naval ships to escort freighters carrying Lai's contraband.

According to August, then Chinese Premier Zhu Rongji, known for his anti-corruption stand and for repeatedly saying publicly that Lai needs to be executed, met Lai twice. In one meeting an offer was allegedly made for Lai to pay US$125 million in exchange for amnesty. This, according to August, suggested the entire government knew of Lai's corruption for a long time. Lai also purportedly gave money to Zhu Niuniu, son of former deputy commander of China's 31st army from Xiamen. Zhu constantly threatened to expose Lai's smuggling if he did not help him with his financial problem from gambling at the Macau casinos.

Lai himself was said to be an apprentice to then General secretary Jiang Zemin. At the height of Lai's corruption in the 1990s, the Fujian party chief was Jia Qinglin. Xi Jinping, now CCP General Secretary, was the Fujian governor (though this is likely irrelevant since by the time Xi Jinping became the governor of Fujian from 1999 to 2002 Lai had already fled to Hong Kong and then Canada in 1999).

== Emigration ==
=== Hong Kong ===
Lai resided in Fujian province before he moved to Hong Kong in April 1991. While he was in HK, the Chinese government pursued him. Lai explained to the HK Immigration Department that he was in HK because he was a friend of Leung Kam-kwong, a senior immigration officer who later died in honor during the Immigration Tower fire in 2000. Leung apparently secretly warned Lai about the immigration department's pending warrant for his arrest. Leung also suggested Lai move to Canada to escape arrest. However, the HK government later responded that the claim was totally baseless as the officer was already dead and could not defend himself against these accusations.

=== Canada ===
Lai fled to Canada with his wife Zeng Mingna (曾明娜) and children in August 1999. He paid US$1 million in cash for a house in South Granville Rise Vancouver. His kids went to private schools at a cost of US$4,000 a year and his wife opened a bank account with a deposit of US$1.5 million. They were chauffeur-driven around in a US$90,000 SUV. In 1999 he was detained, apparently caught on a 28-day gambling spree at Casino Niagara in Niagara Falls. Lai was a regular customer at the casino where at one time bought as much as US$3 million worth of chips. Canadian police noticed him and suspected he was involved in money laundering or loan-sharking. Lai and his family then made a claim to stay in Canada as refugees.

The family used a HKSAR passport to emigrate to Canada. Following heavy pressure from Beijing, Lai's Hong Kong permanent residency and HKSAR passport were revoked in 2002 by the Hong Kong Government, saying that he obtained the status dishonestly.

Following his detention in Canada, Lai was able to obtain his release, pending the hearing into his refugee claim, by placing himself under house arrest. He returned to the family's luxury condo in Burnaby, a suburb of Vancouver, and agreed to pay $80,000 per month to live under the guard of a private security firm. Notwithstanding such arrangements, Lai was observed by RCMP officers associating with known members of Asian smuggling gangs in Canada.

Lai divorced his wife in June 2005. In 2009 Lai was granted a working permit and worked at a Vancouver real-estate company as a consultant.

== Charges ==
Despite Lai's departure for Canada, the Chinese government continued to pursue charges against him, and sought his extradition. In the same corruption case, one of the largest in modern Chinese history, many high-level municipal and provincial officials were sacked and a few were sentenced to life in prison or death. The complex smuggling case shifted the entire political scene in Fujian by the late 1990s. A special task force operation was created by the government to track down Lai on April 20, 1999, called "4.20" (420专案组) with about 1200 investigators.

Lai denied criminal wrongdoing, and stated that the allegations were politically motivated. Others like Pierre Lemieux defended Lai, saying he is only a criminal because of China's communist economic system and that with a free market, there would be no need for smugglers like Lai. Chinese websites could write about Lai as long as he was depicted as evil.

One of Lai's attorneys, Winnipeg lawyer David Matas, said that it was doubtful Lai could ever get a fair trial in China, given the extent of the Communist Party's influence in the opaque judicial system. Matas has filed for an assessment of whether Lai's family are at risk if they are returned to China. As long as immigration officials are considering this request, he says, they may not be removed from Canada.

Nevertheless, Lai has repeatedly been denied political refugee status in Canada, for example by a ruling in September 2005 by the Supreme Court in Ottawa, Ontario. This affirmed the decision of the Federal Court of Appeal, which in April had refused to hear Lai's appeal of the June 2002 Refugee Board decision, on the grounds that Lai and his wife failed to meet the standards to be designated as refugees.

Canada does not have the death penalty and is prohibited from deporting accused criminals to countries where they will face capital punishment. China claimed that he would not be executed if extradited from Canada. Canadian courts did not believe this guarantee, due to certain CPC bias in any trial and as 14 others involved in the complex Xiamen racket have already been executed. Svend Robinson, then New Democratic Party member of parliament for Burnaby-Douglas, also noted that Lai's brother died in a Fujian labour-camp after receiving a lesser sentence. The likelihood of a de facto death sentence remained an obstacle to his deportation.

On February 3, 2009, the Canadian Government granted Lai a work permit. Canadian officials acknowledged that Lai did not have access to the vast fortune they thought he had upon arrival in Canada back in 1999. Lai has said his legal and living expenses were being funded by friends, whom he has declined to identify, saying they could be in danger if the Chinese government knew their names.

On July 8, 2011, John Baird, the Minister of Foreign Affairs of Canada, said that, the extradition of Lai must be conducted using Canadian laws. In early stages, Lai's Refugee Application was refused, with the possibility of extradition to China.

== Extradition ==
Lai's corruption is known to have reached the top levels of the Chinese government. He has publicly declared in the past that if he returned to China: "many high government officials will not be able to sleep. Incidents will happen." In relation to the case, 14 people have already been executed, about 300 provincial officials have already been put on trial. Since 2002 Beijing sent MSS agents to follow him wherever he went.

On July 22, 2011, Lai was extradited to China. He was escorted to Vancouver International Airport and boarded Air Canada flight 29 (AC 29) bound for Beijing. He was later transferred to Chinese custody on July 23, 2011, and signed an arrest warrant issued for his arrest upon his arrival in Beijing. Spokesman of the Chinese ministry of foreign affairs has expressed satisfaction concerning this decision, referring to Lai as responsible for the "biggest economic crime in the history of the People's Republic of China."

== Sentence ==
On May 18, 2012, Lai was sentenced to life imprisonment on charges of smuggling and bribery by the Intermediate People's Court in Xiamen. In addition, all of his property was confiscated.
