= Johnny Chung =

American political fundraiser

Johnny Chien Chuen Chung (鍾育瀚; pinyin: Zhōng Yùhàn) (born 1955) was a major figure in the 1996 United States campaign finance controversy.

Born in Taiwan, Chung was the owner of a "blastfaxing" business (an automated system that quickly sends out faxes to thousands of businesses) in California, United States in the early 1990s. Chung eventually found himself in the middle of the Washington, D.C. elite within a couple weeks of his first donations to the Democratic Party. Between 1994 and 1996, Chung donated $366,000 to the Democratic National Committee. Eventually, all of the money was returned. Chung told federal investigators that $35,000 of the money he donated came from China's military intelligence.

Called a "hustler" by a U.S. National Security Council (NSC) aide Robert Suettinger, Chung befriended former Lt. Col. Liu Chaoying during a Commerce Department trade mission to China.

In a July 20, 1997 Chicago Tribune article Johnny Chung was quoted as saying, "I see the White House is like a subway: You have to put in coins to open the gates."

Chung later testified under oath to the U.S. House Committee in May 1999 that he was introduced to Chinese Gen. Ji Shengde, then head of Chinese military intelligence, by Liu Chaoying. Chung said that Ji told him: "We like your president very much. We would like to see him reelect [sic]. I will give you 300,000 U.S. dollars. You can give it to the president and the Democrat [sic] Party." Both Liu and the Chinese government denied the claims.

Chung was eventually convicted of bank fraud, tax evasion, and two misdemeanor counts of conspiring to violate election law. On December 14, 1998, Johnny Chung was sentenced to probation and 3,000 hours.
