= Ji Shengde =

Former Chinese general

Ji Shengde (simplified Chinese: 姬胜德; traditional Chinese: 姬勝德; born 1948) is a former major-general in charge of military intelligence in the People's Liberation Army of China. In June 1999 he was removed from his post after being implicated in the Lai Changxing smuggling scandal centered on the Fujian port of Xiamen. In 2000 Ji was sentenced to death with a two-year reprieve (usually commuted to a life sentence after two years), but the sentence was later reduced to 20 years in jail.

U.S. Democratic National Committee fund-raiser Johnny Chung testified before the U.S. Congress in May 1999 that Ji gave him 300,000 U.S. dollars to donate to the Democratic Party.

Ji is the son of Ji Pengfei, who was China's foreign minister when U.S. President Richard Nixon visited China in 1972.
