= Victor E. Renuart Jr. =

United States Air Force general (born 1949)

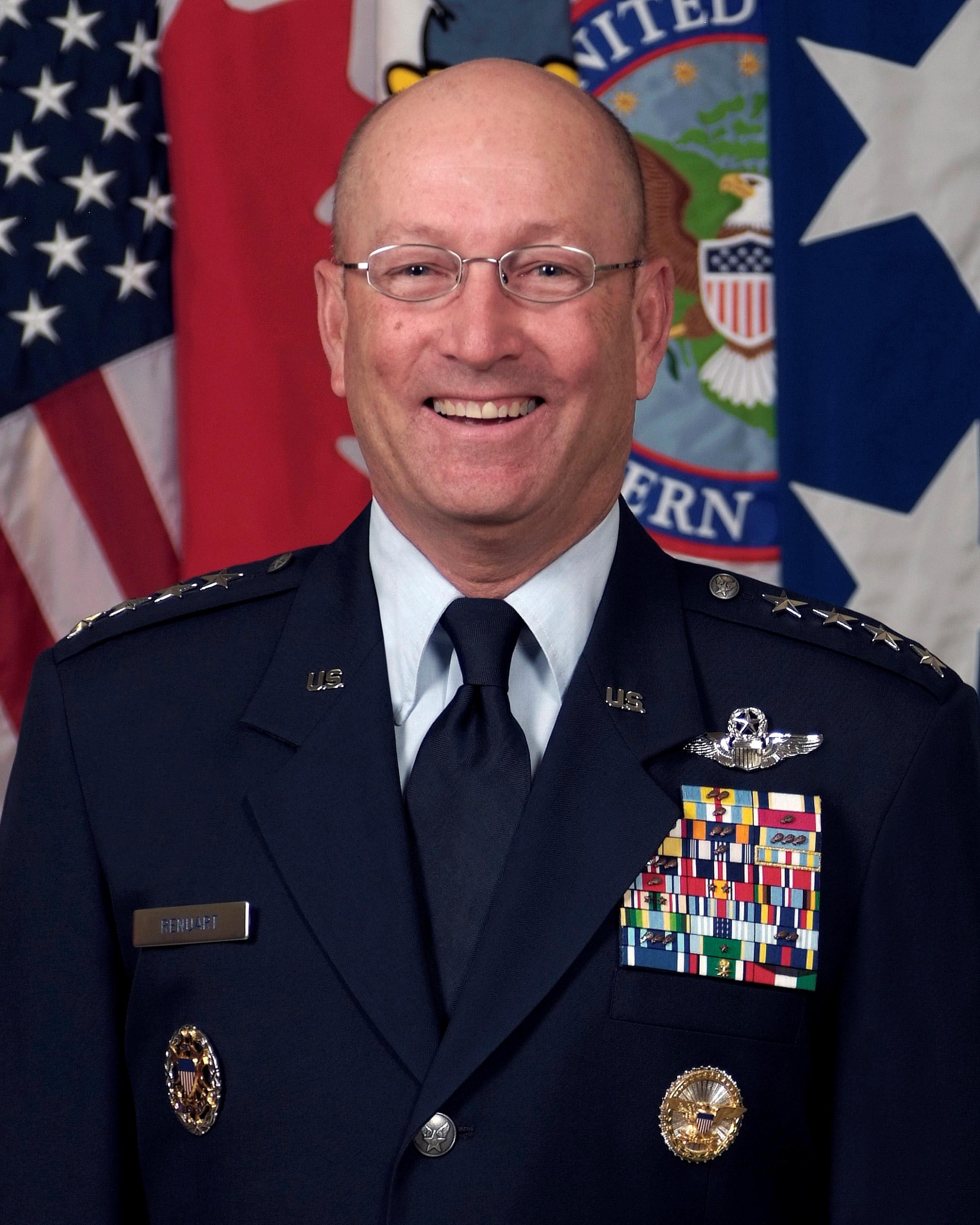
- General Victor Renuart
- Born: November 26, 1949 (age 76); Miami, Florida, U.S.
- Military career
- Allegiance: United States
- Branch: United States Air Force
- Service years: 1972–2010
- Rank: General
- Commands: United States Northern Command; North American Aerospace Defense Command; Joint Task Force – Southwest Asia; 9th Air and Space Expeditionary Task Force – Southwest Asia; 347th Wing; 52nd Fighter Wing; 76th Tactical Fighter Squadron
- Conflicts: Gulf War; Operation Deny Flight
- Awards: Defense Distinguished Service Medal (4); Air Force Distinguished Service Medal; Defense Superior Service Medal (2); Legion of Merit (2)

Victor Eugene "Gene" Renuart Jr. (/ˈrɛnjuɑːrt/ REN-yoo-art; born November 26, 1949) is a retired United States Air Force four-star general. His last military assignment was as the commander of United States Northern Command and North American Aerospace Defense Command from March 23, 2007, to May 19, 2010. Prior to that, he served as director of strategic plans and policy, the Joint Staff. Renuart retired from the Air Force on July 1, 2010, after over 39 years of service.

== Military career ==
Renuart entered the United States Air Force in 1971 following graduation from Indiana University. He was commissioned through the Officer Training School in 1972 and attended Undergraduate Pilot Training. He has commanded a fighter squadron, a NATO support group, a fighter wing and a composite wing. He served as commander of the 76th Fighter Squadron during Operations Desert Shield and Desert Storm, and supported Operation Deny Flight as director of plans for the NATO Combined Air Operations Center at Headquarters 5th Allied Tactical Air Force. In addition, he commanded Joint Task Force – Southwest Asia (JTF-SWA) and 9th Air and Space Expeditionary Task Force – Southwest Asia (9 ASETF) at Eskan Village in Riyadh, Saudi Arabia, where he was responsible for the control and execution of Operation Southern Watch. Renuart then served as the director of operations (CCJ3) at Headquarters, United States Central Command (USCENTCOM) at MacDill AFB, Florida, and the USCENTCOM Forward Headquarters at Camp As Sayliyah in Doha, Qatar, where he oversaw the planning and execution of all joint and allied combat, humanitarian assistance and reconstruction operations for Operations Enduring Freedom and Iraqi Freedom. He also served as vice commander, Pacific Air Forces (PACAF), where he was responsible for Air Force and Air Component Commander activities for the commander, United States Pacific Command (USPACOM). He has flown combat missions in Operations Desert Storm, Deny Flight, Northern Watch and Southern Watch.

Prior to assuming his final position, Renuart was the director of strategic plans and policy for the Joint Staff (J5) and senior military assistant to the Secretary of Defense. He provided strategic intelligence, policy guidance and planning focus to develop and execute the National Military Strategy in support of worldwide national security operations, politico-military affairs, international negotiations and organizational issues through coordination with the combatant commands, the services, OSD, defense agencies, other U.S. government agencies and international organizations.

== Education ==
- 1967 Graduate from Christopher Columbus High School in Miami, Florida
- 1971 Bachelor of Science degree in production and industrial management, Indiana University, Bloomington
- 1975 Master of Arts degree in psychology, Troy State University, Troy, Alabama
- 1977 Distinguished graduate, Squadron Officer School, Maxwell AFB, Alabama
- 1979 Air Command and Staff College, Maxwell AFB, Alabama
- 1992 Army War College, Carlisle Barracks, Pennsylvania
- 1997 Senior Officers in National Security Program, Johns Hopkins University, Baltimore, Maryland

== Assignments ==
1. January 1972 – March 1973, student, undergraduate pilot training, 3640th Pilot Training Wing/38th Flying Training Wing, Laredo AFB, Texas
2. March 1973 – July 1976, T-37 instructor pilot, 29th Flying Training Wing, Craig AFB, Alabama
3. July 1976 – September 1979, assistant professor of aerospace studies (Air Force ROTC Detachment 225, University of Notre Dame, South Bend, Indiana
4. September 1979 – April 1980, student, AT-38 and A-10 training, Holloman AFB, New Mexico, and Davis-Monthan AFB, Arizona
5. May 1980 – June 1982, A-10 instructor pilot and flight commander, 92nd Tactical Fighter Squadron, 81st Tactical Fighter Wing, Royal Air Force Bentwaters, England
6. June 1982 – July 1984, operations officer, Detachment 2, 81st Tactical Fighter Wing, Detachment 2, Leipheim Air Base, West Germany
7. July 1984 – November 1985, operations inspector, Office of the Inspector General, Headquarters U.S. Air Forces in Europe, Ramstein AB, West Germany
8. November 1985 – September 1986, executive officer to the inspector general, Headquarters U.S. Air Forces in Europe, Ramstein AB, West Germany
9. September 1986 – July 1991, chief of wing inspections, 23rd Tactical Fighter Wing, later, operations officer, later, commander, 76th Tactical Fighter Squadron, England AFB, Louisiana
10. July 1991 – July 1992, student, Army War College, Carlisle Barracks, Pennsylvania
11. July 1992 – March 1993, director of assignments, deputy chief of staff for personnel, Headquarters U.S. Air Forces in Europe, Ramstein AB, Germany
12. March 1993 – October 1994, commander, Headquarters Support Group, Allied Air Forces Central Europe, NATO, Ramstein AB, Germany
13. October 1994 – June 1995, executive to the assistant chief of staff for operations, Operations Directorate, and senior U.S. representative, Allied Air Forces Central Europe, NATO, Ramstein AB, Germany (November 1994 – May 1995, director of plans, NATO Combined Air Operations Center, 5th Allied Tactical Air Force, Vicenza, Italy)
14. June 1995 – April 1996, assistant director of operations, Headquarters U.S. Air Forces in Europe, Ramstein AB, Germany
15. April 1996 – June 1998, commander, 52nd Fighter Wing, Spangdahlem AB, Germany
16. July 1998 – March 2000, commander, 347th Wing, Moody AFB, Georgia
17. April 2000 – May 2001, commander, Joint Task Force-Southwest Asia and commander, 9th Air and Space Expeditionary Task Force-Southwest Asia, U.S. Central Command, Riyadh, Saudi Arabia
18. June 2001 – November 2003, director of operations (J-3), U.S. Central Command, MacDill AFB, Florida
19. December 2003 – August 2005, vice commander, Pacific Air Forces, Hickam AFB, Hawaii
20. August 2005 – August 2006, director for strategic plans and policy, the Joint Staff, Washington, D.C.
21. August 2006 – February 2007, Senior Military Assistant to the Secretary of Defense, Washington, D.C.
22. March 2007 – May 2010, United States Northern Command (USNORTHCOM) and commander, North American Aerospace Defense Command (NORAD).

== Flight information ==
- Rating: Command pilot
- Flight hours: More than 3,800, including 60 combat missions
- Aircraft flown: T-37, T-38, AT-38, A-10, F-16, F-15, C-130/HC-130 and HH-60

== Major awards and decorations ==
US Air Force Command Pilot Badge
Office of the Secretary of Defense Identification Badge
Joint Chiefs of Staff Badge

Defense Distinguished Service Medal with three bronze oak leaf clusters
Air Force Distinguished Service Medal
Defense Superior Service Medal with bronze oak leaf cluster
Legion of Merit with bronze oak leaf cluster
Meritorious Service Medal with four bronze oak leaf clusters
Air Medal with two bronze oak leaf clusters
Aerial Achievement Medal with three bronze oak leaf clusters
Air Force Commendation Medal with bronze oak leaf cluster
Air Force Achievement Medal with bronze oak leaf cluster
Joint Meritorious Unit Award
Air Force Outstanding Unit Award with Valor device, silver, and two bronze oak leaf clusters
Air Force Outstanding Unit Award (second ribbon required due to accouterment spacing)
Air Force Organizational Excellence Award
Combat Readiness Medal with bronze oak leaf cluster
National Defense Service Medal with two bronze service stars
Armed Forces Expeditionary Medal
Southwest Asia Service Medal with two bronze service stars
Global War on Terrorism Expeditionary Medal
Global War on Terrorism Service Medal
Armed Forces Service Medal
Air Force Overseas Short Tour Service Ribbon
Air Force Overseas Long Tour Service Ribbon with two bronze oak leaf clusters
Air Force Longevity Service Award with silver and three bronze oak leaf clusters
Small Arms Expert Marksmanship Ribbon with bronze service star
Air Force Training Ribbon
Canadian Meritorious Service Cross (as per Canadian Forces General Order 058/10 031613Z) and the Canada Gazette of 27 March 2010
NATO Medal for Former Yugoslavia
Kuwait Liberation Medal (Saudi Arabia)
Kuwait Liberation Medal (Kuwait)

== Effective dates of promotion ==
Promotions
Insignia	Rank	Date
	General	March 23, 2007
	Lieutenant General	January 1, 2004
	Major General	August 1, 2000
	Brigadier General	August 1, 1997
	Colonel	November 1, 1992
	Lieutenant Colonel	May 1, 1987
	Major	December 1, 1983
	Captain	January 12, 1976
	First Lieutenant	January 12, 1974
	Second Lieutenant	January 12, 1972

Military offices
Preceded by Timothy J. Keating	Commander of the North American Aerospace Defense Command; Commander of the United States Northern Command; March 23, 2007 – May 19, 2010	Succeeded by James A. Winnefeld Jr.
