= Jennifer Short =

U.S. Air Force general

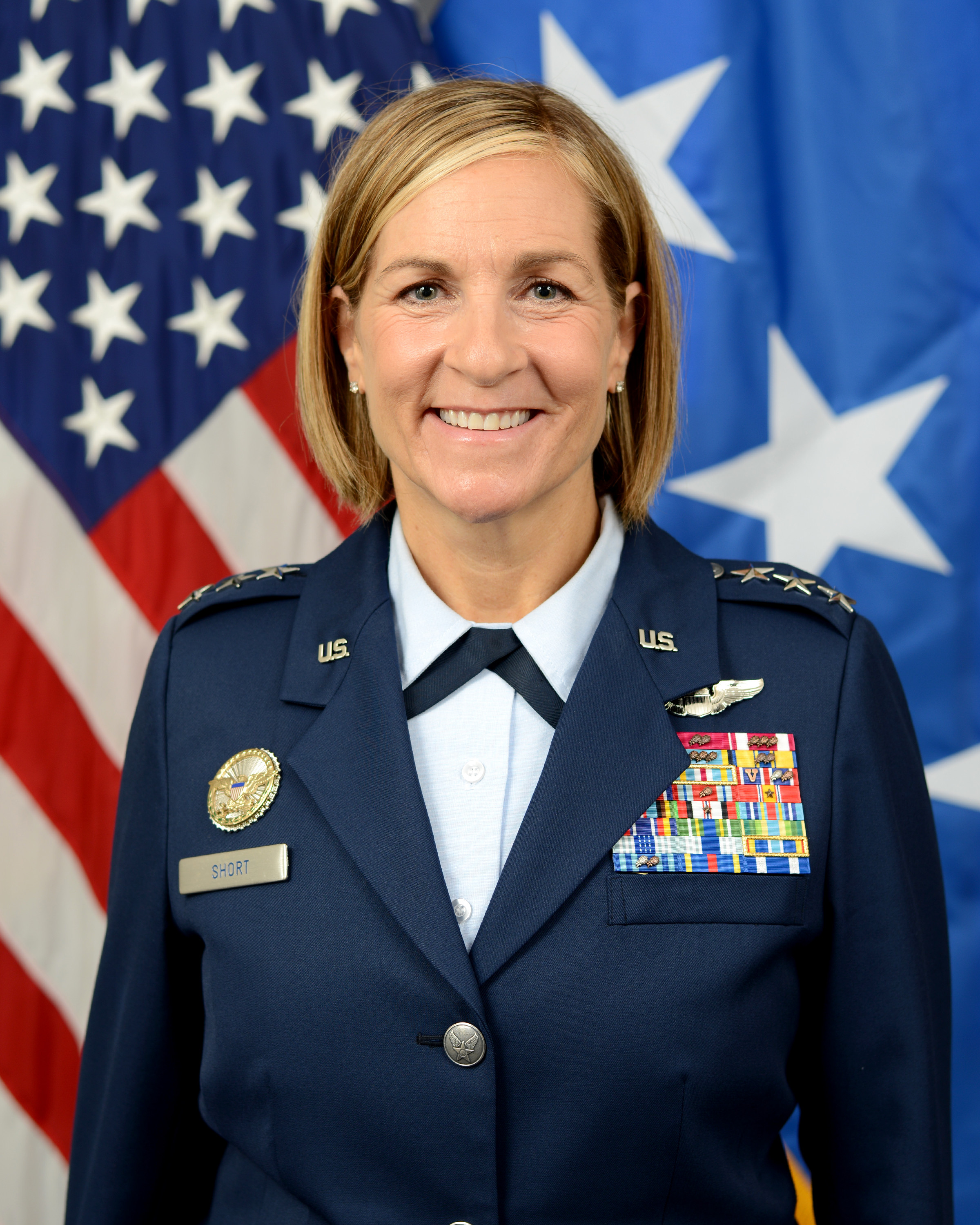
- Official portrait, 2024
- Born: 1970 or 1971 (age 54–55)
- Spouse: Scott Evens (m. 2010)
- Military career
- Allegiance: United States
- Branch: United States Air Force
- Service years: 1995–2025
- Rank: Lieutenant General
- Commands: Senior Military Assistant to the Secretary of Defense; 23rd Wing; 358th Fighter Squadron
- Conflicts: Iraqi no-fly zones conflict; Operation Southern Watch; Iraq War; War in Afghanistan
- Awards: Defense Superior Service Medal; Legion of Merit (3)

Jennifer Marie Short (born 1971) is a retired United States Air Force lieutenant general who last served as the senior military assistant to the secretary of defense from October 2024 to February 2025. She served as the director of legislative affairs, Office of the Secretary of the Air Force. Prior to that she served as the deputy director for strategic planning and policy at United States Indo-Pacific Command.

Short is a command pilot with more than 1,800 hours in the A-10 Thunderbolt (Warthog).

== Education ==
Short graduated magna cum laude with a Bachelor of Science degree in marketing from Arizona State University in 1993. She completed Officer Training School at Maxwell Air Force Base, Alabama, in 1995 as a distinguished graduate.

== Military career ==
Over her 30-year military career, Short held a variety of positions at the squadron, wing, major command, headquarters and combatant command levels, including serving as commander of the 23rd Wing, at Moody Air Force Base, Georgia, and director of legislative affairs at United States Central Command.

Short is a command pilot with more than 1,800 hours. She has flown more than 430 combat hours in the A-10 in operations Southern Watch, Iraqi Freedom and Enduring Freedom.

In July 2024, Short was nominated for promotion to lieutenant general and assignment as the senior military assistant to the secretary of defense. Short was relieved of her assignment as senior military assistant to the Secretary of Defense on 22 February 2025, by the newly appointed Secretary Pete Hegseth.

== Personal life ==
Short is the third person in her family to ascend to the general officer ranks in the Air Force. Her father, Michael Short, retired from the Air Force in 2000 at the rank of lieutenant general after serving in his final assignment as NATO's Joint Air Force Component Commander for Operation Allied Force during the 78-day war in Kosovo. Earlier in his career he flew 276 combat missions in Vietnam in the F-4 and was awarded the Silver Star, the nation's third highest award for gallantry in action. Short's brother, Christopher M. Short, retired in 2019 at the rank of brigadier general.

Short married Scott Evens on 23 October 2010.

Military offices
Preceded by Thomas E. Kunkel	Commander of the 23rd Wing; 2017–2019	Succeeded by Daniel P. Walls
Preceded by Ronald P. Clark	Senior Military Assistant to the Secretary of Defense; 2024–2025	Vacant Title next held by Christopher LaNeve
