= Ninth Air Force (disambiguation) =

Ninth Air Force may refer to:

- The current Ninth Air Force, responsible for U.S. air operations in the middle east and known from 2009 to 2020 as United States Air Forces Central Command
- The former Ninth Air Force (2009–2020), in existence from 2009 to 2020
