= Thomas E. Kunkel =

U.S. Air Force general

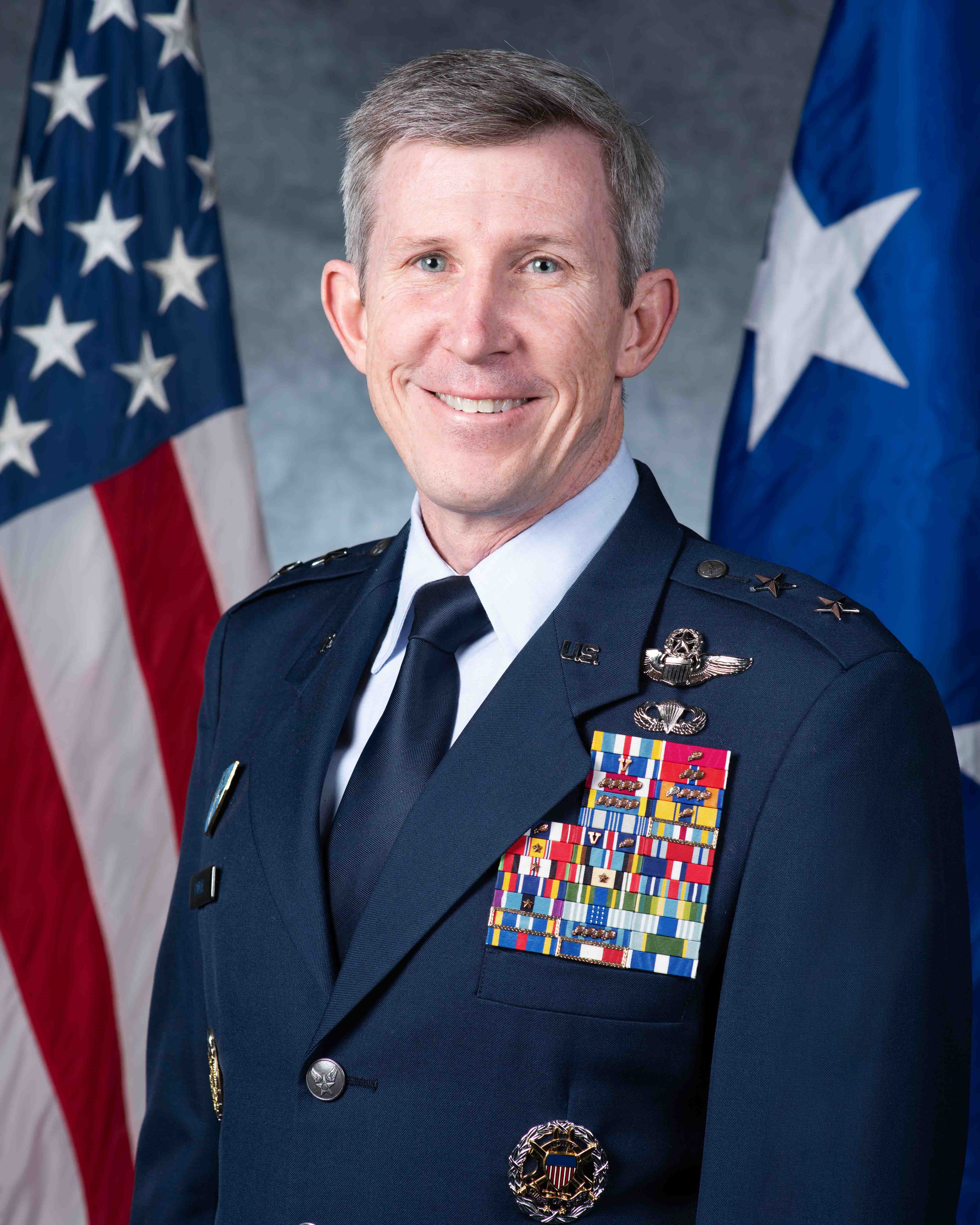
- Official portrait, 2024
- Military career
- Allegiance: United States
- Branch: United States Air Force
- Service years: 1994–2024
- Rank: Major General
- Commands: NATO Airborne Early Warning and Control Force; 23rd Wing; 609th Air and Space Operations Center; 41st Rescue Squadron
- Conflicts: War in Afghanistan; Iraq War
- Awards: Defense Superior Service Medal; Legion of Merit (2); Distinguished Flying Cross; Bronze Star Medal (3)

Thomas E. Kunkel is a retired United States Air Force major general who served as the commander of the NATO Airborne Early Warning and Control Force. He also served as the deputy director for operations of the Joint Staff.

Military offices
Preceded by Chad Franks	Commander of the 23rd Wing; 2015–2017	Succeeded by Jennifer Short
Preceded by Wesley Hallman	Chief Air Force Legislative Liaison to United States House of Representatives; 2017–2019	Succeeded by William H. Kale
Preceded by George M. Wikoff	Deputy Director for Operations of the Joint Staff (Operations Team Five); 2019–2021	Succeeded by Larry Broadwell
Preceded by Jörg Lebert	Commander of the NATO Airborne Early Warning and Control Force; 2021–2024	Succeeded by Andreas Korb
