= General Franks =

General Franks may refer to:

- Chad Franks (fl. 1990s–2020s), U.S. Air Force major general
- Frederick M. Franks Jr. (born 1936), U.S. Army general
- Tommy Franks (born 1945), U.S. Army general
