= Senior Military Assistant to the Secretary of Defense =

Senior appointment in the United States Department of Defense

- OSD Identification Badge

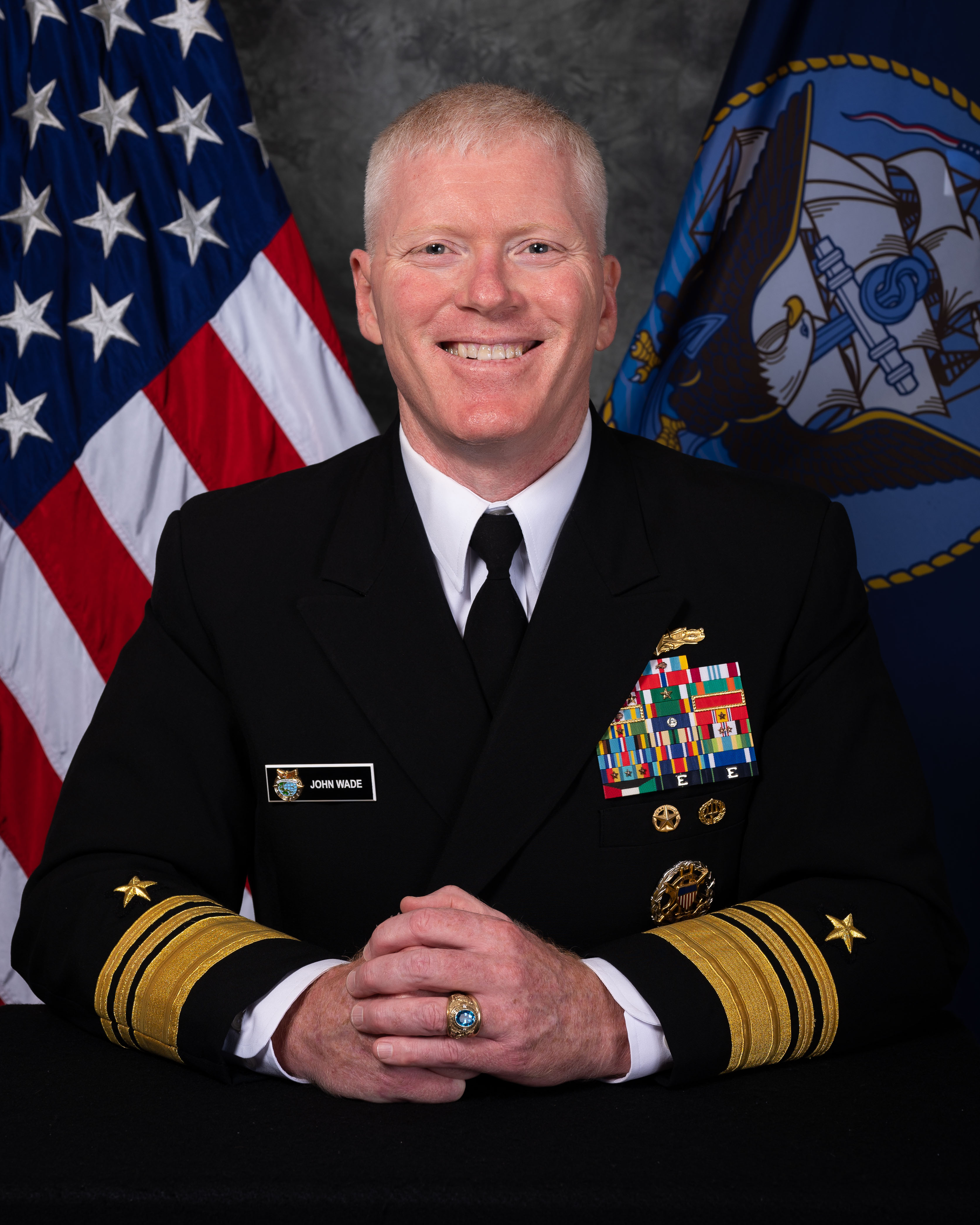
- Incumbent; Vice Admiral John F.G. Wade since 26 May 2026
- Office of the Secretary of Defense
- Type: Senior military assistant
- Reports to: United States Secretary of Defense
- Seat: The Pentagon, Arlington, Virginia
- Appointer: The president with Senate advice and consent

The senior military assistant to the secretary of defense (SMA SecDef) is the highest-ranking commissioned officer in the Office of the Secretary of Defense (OSD). The SMA directly reports to the secretary of defense, performing administrative work in the Secretary's name and handles relations between the Secretary and other pertinent government bodies, including the rest of the OSD, Congress and the Joint Chiefs of Staff. As a joint duty assignment, the SMA is one of 310 officer positions granted exemption from statutory limits on general officer numbers under 10 U.S.C. § 526.

The SMA holds the rank of lieutenant general or vice admiral. They are nominated by the president and must be confirmed by the Senate.

== List of senior military assistants ==
No.	Senior Military Assistant		Term			Service branch	Secretary of Defense	Ref.
No.	Portrait	Name	Took office	Left office	Term length	Service branch	Secretary of Defense	Ref.
1		Major General; Colin Powell	July 1983	June 1986	~2 years, 335 days	U.S. Army	Caspar Weinberger	-
2		Vice Admiral; Donald S. Jones	June 1986	January 1987	~214 days	U.S. Navy	Caspar Weinberger; Frank Carlucci	
3		Major General; Gordon E. Fornell	January 1987	September 1988	~1 year, 244 days	U.S. Air Force	Frank Carlucci	
4		Rear Admiral (lower half); William Owens	July 1988	August 1990	~2 years, 31 days	U.S. Navy	Frank Carlucci; Dick Cheney	
5		Rear Admiral (lower half); Thomas J. Lopez	August 1990	May 1992	~1 year, 274 days	U.S. Navy	Dick Cheney	
6		Major General; John P. Jumper	May 1992	February 1994	~1 year, 276 days	U.S. Air Force	Les Aspin	
7		Major General; Paul J. Kern	March 1994	June 1996	~2 years, 92 days	U.S. Army	William Perry	
8		Major General; Randolph W. House	June 1996	January 1997	~214 days	U.S. Army	William Perry	
9		Lieutenant General; James L. Jones	January 1997	May 1999	~2 years, 120 days	U.S. Marine Corps	William Cohen	
10		Vice Admiral; Gregory G. Johnson	May 1999	October 2000	~1 year, 153 days	U.S. Navy	William Cohen	-
11		Rear Admiral (lower half); Deborah Loewer	October 2000	2001	~258 days	U.S. Navy	William Cohen	-
12		Vice Admiral; Edmund P. Giambastiani	2001	August 2002	~1 year, 46 days	U.S. Navy	William Cohen; Donald Rumsfeld	-
13		Lieutenant General; Bantz J. Craddock	August 2002	July 2004	~1 year, 335 days	U.S. Army	Donald Rumsfeld	-
14		Vice Admiral; James G. Stavridis	July 2004	August 2006	~2 years, 31 days	U.S. Navy	Donald Rumsfeld	-
15		Lieutenant General; Victor E. Renuart Jr.	August 2006	February 2007	~184 days	U.S. Air Force	Robert Gates	
16		Lieutenant General; Peter W. Chiarelli	March 2007	August 2008	~1 year, 153 days	U.S. Army	Robert Gates	-
17		Lieutenant General; David M. Rodriguez	August 2008	June 2009	~304 days	U.S. Army	Robert Gates	-
18		Vice Admiral; Joseph D. Kernan	June 2009	April 2011	~1 year, 304 days	U.S. Navy	Robert Gates	-
19		Lieutenant General; John F. Kelly	April 2011	August 2012	~1 year, 122 days	U.S. Marine Corps	Robert Gates; Leon Panetta	-
20		Lieutenant General; Thomas D. Waldhauser	August 2012	September 2013	~1 year, 31 days	U.S. Marine Corps	Leon Panetta; Chuck Hagel	-
21		Lieutenant General; Robert B. Abrams	September 2013	24 June 2015	~1 year, 282 days	U.S. Army	Chuck Hagel; Ash Carter	-
22		Lieutenant General; Ronald F. Lewis	24 June 2015	12 November 2015	141 days	U.S. Army	Ash Carter	
23		Brigadier General; Eric Smith	~7 January 2016	~23 June 2017	~1 year, 167 days	U.S. Marine Corps	Ash Carter; Jim Mattis	
24		Vice Admiral; Craig S. Faller	~23 June 2017	~1 September 2018	~1 year, 70 days	U.S. Navy	Jim Mattis	
25		Lieutenant General; George W. Smith Jr.	1 September 2018	12 August 2019	345 days	U.S. Marine Corps	Jim Mattis; Mark Esper	
26		Lieutenant General; Bryan P. Fenton	12 August 2019	3 June 2021	1 year, 295 days	U.S. Army	Mark Esper; Lloyd Austin	
27		Lieutenant General; Randy George	3 June 2021	~7 July 2022	1 year, 34 days	U.S. Army	Lloyd Austin	
28		Lieutenant General; Ronald P. Clark	~7 July 2022	1 October 2024	2 years, 86 days	U.S. Army	Lloyd Austin	
29		Lieutenant General; Jennifer Short	1 October 2024	22 February 2025	144 days	U.S. Air Force	Lloyd Austin; Pete Hegseth	
30		Lieutenant General; Christopher LaNeve	7 April 2025	5 February 2026	304 days	U.S. Army	Pete Hegseth	
31		Vice Admiral; John F.G. Wade	26 May 2026	Incumbent	104 days	U.S. Navy	Pete Hegseth	
