= Ronald P. Clark =

United States Army general

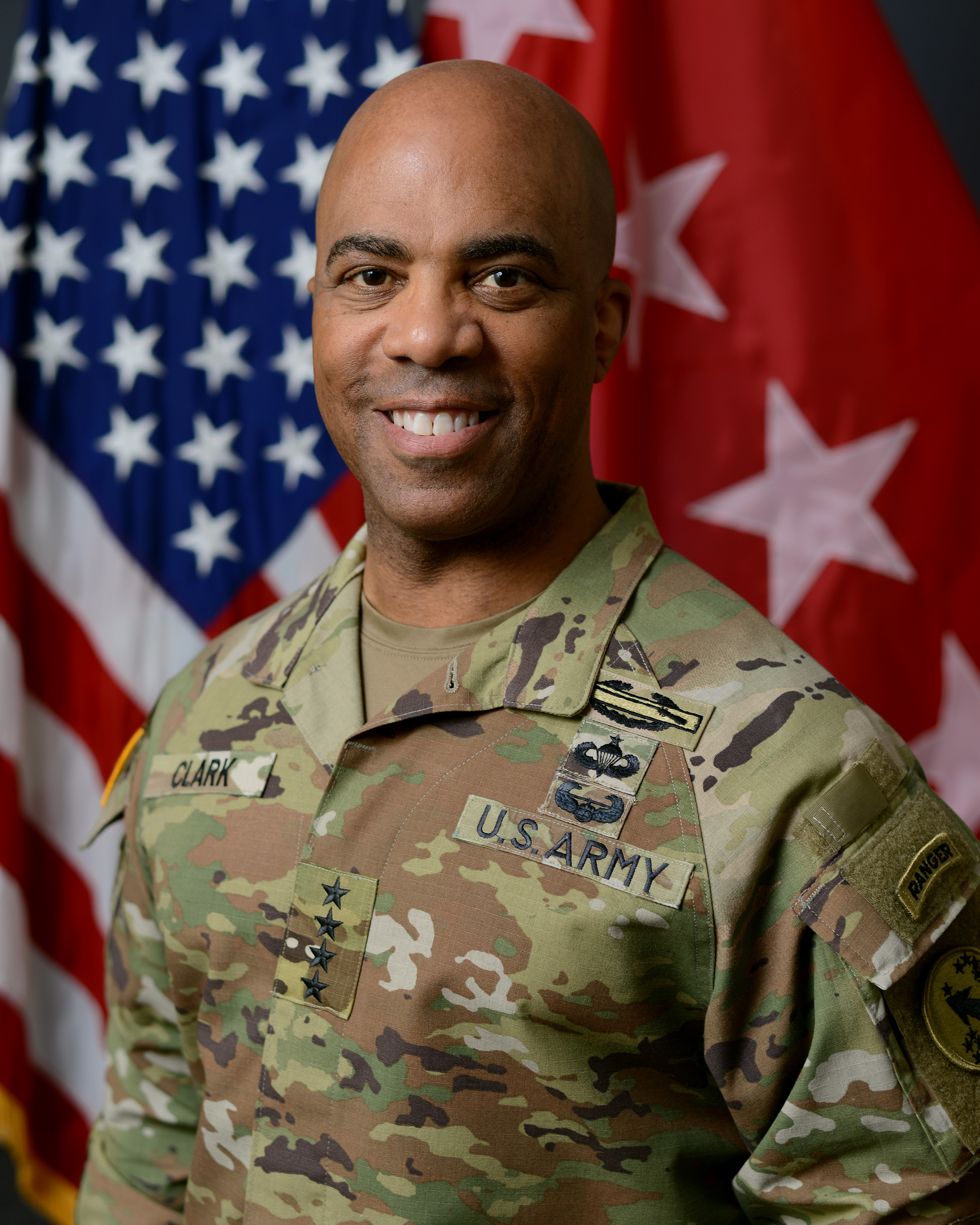
- Born: 15 August 1966 (age 60); Maryland, U.S.
- Military career
- Branch: United States Army
- Service years: 1988–present
- Rank: General
- Nickname: Ron
- Commands: United States Army Pacific; United States Army Central; 25th Infantry Division; 192nd Infantry Brigade; 1st Battalion, 506th Infantry Regiment
- Conflicts: Gulf War; Iraq War; Operation Inherent Resolve
- Awards: Army Distinguished Service Medal (2); Defense Superior Service Medal (2); Legion of Merit (4)

Ronald Patrick "Ron" Clark (born 15 August 1966) is a United States Army general who has served as the commanding general of United States Army Pacific since 8 November 2024. He most recently served as the senior military assistant to the secretary of defense from 2022 to 2024. He previously commanded United States Army Central from 2021 to 2022. He also served as Chief of Staff, United States Indo-Pacific Command, commanding general of the 25th Infantry Division, and before that, as Chief of Staff, United States Army Pacific.

== Military career ==
Clark was born in Maryland on 15 August 1966. He was commissioned as a second lieutenant of Infantry upon graduation from the United States Military Academy at West Point in 1988. He began his career as a Rifle Platoon Leader and Scout Platoon Leader in 5th Battalion, 5th Cavalry Regiment, 3rd Armored Division, both in Germany and in Southwest Asia during Operation Desert Shield and Operation Desert Storm. He was assigned to the 25th Infantry Division, at Schofield Barracks, Hawaii, where he commanded B Company, 1st Battalion, 27th Infantry Regiment, and later served as aide-de-camp to the Commanding General, 25th Infantry Division (Light) and US Army Hawaii.

Clark served as Operations Officer and Executive Officer in 1st Battalion (Airborne), 509th Infantry Regiment at Fort Polk, Louisiana. He later served as aide-de-camp to the Commanding General, United States Army Forces Command at Fort McPherson, Georgia. Clark was Commander of 1st Battalion, 506th Infantry Regiment, 101st Airborne Division (Air Assault) both at Fort Campbell, Kentucky and in Iraq in support of Operation Iraqi Freedom.

Clark was the 41st Chief of Infantry Branch at United States Army Human Resources Command. He also served as Director of the Center for the Army Profession and Ethic at West Point. He was Commander of the 192nd Infantry Brigade at Fort Benning, Georgia. Next, Clark was the Army's Deputy Director of Strategy, Plans and Policy in the Pentagon. He followed that by serving as Deputy Commanding General – Support, 82nd Airborne Division at Fort Bragg, North Carolina and in Iraq during Operation Inherent Resolve. Clark also served as the Deputy Chief of Staff-Operations for the NATO Allied Rapid Reaction Corps.

Clark replaced Major General Christopher G. Cavoli as commander of the 25th Infantry Division on 4 January 2018.

In July 2024, Clark was nominated for promotion to general and assignment as the commanding general of United States Army Pacific. His nomination was placed on hold by Senator Tommy Tuberville, but it was lifted after a few weeks.

== Education ==
Clark earned a Bachelor of Science degree from the United States Military Academy in 1988. He followed this with a Master of Military Art and Science degree at the United States Army Command and General Staff College.

Clark completed a United States Army College Fellowship at Duke University. He also graduated from the MIT Seminar XXI National Security Studies Program.

== Personal life ==
Ron Clark is a 1984 graduate of Leesville High School. He is married to Simona Clark. The couple has two adult children.

Clark's father, a Vietnam war veteran, served in the Army as a non-commissioned officer for 28 years, reaching the rank of master sergeant.

== Media ==
In 2006, then Battalion Commander Lieutenant Colonel Clark appeared in a video about the usage of tanks during the deployment of the 1st Battalion, 506th Infantry Regiment, 101st Airborne Division (Air Assault) in Ramadi, Iraq.

Also in 2006, Clark was featured in a video titled "Band of Brothers" about the deployment of the 1st Battalion, 506th Infantry Regiment, 101st Airborne Division (Air Assault) in Ramadi, Iraq.

Clark was interviewed on 17 September 2018 by The West Point Center for Oral History and reflected on his career and leadership principles as well as the role that West Point has played in his life.

Clark appeared in a video invitation to the 25th Infantry Division Association to Tropic Lightning Week on 5 October 2018.

On 31 July 2020, Duke University Professor David Schanzer joined Major General Clark in a conversation about race, diversity, and inclusion in the U.S. Army.

== Awards and decorations ==
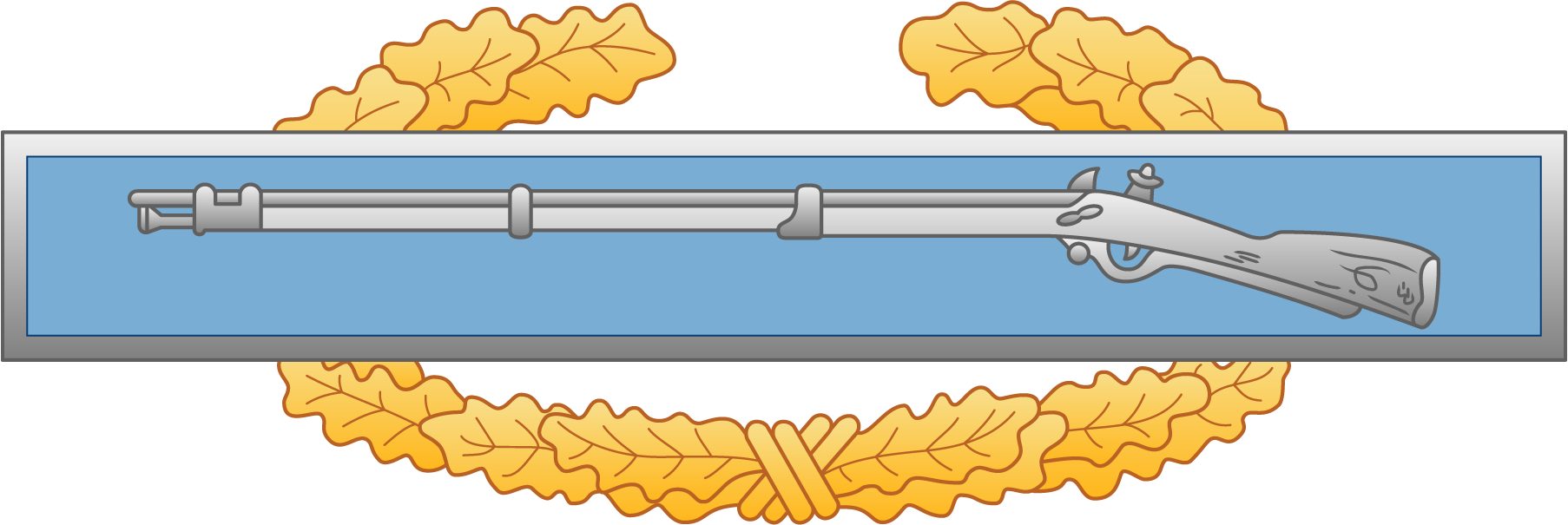

Tabs and skill badges

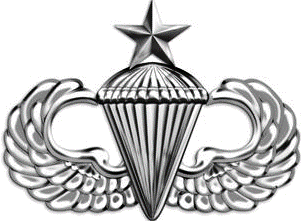
Identification badges

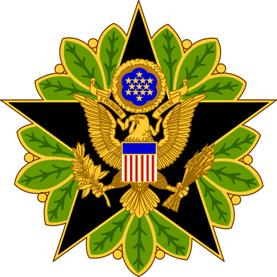
Distinctive unit insignia

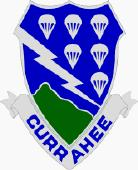
Unit awards

Combat Service Identification Badge

Badges and insignia
Master Combat Infantryman Badge
Personal decorations
Defense Distinguished Service Medal		Army Distinguished Service Medal with one bronze oak leaf cluster
Defense Superior Service Medal with one oak leaf cluster	Legion of Merit with three oak leaf clusters	Bronze Star Medal
Defense Meritorious Service Medal	Meritorious Service Medal with one silver oak leaf cluster	Army Commendation Medal with two oak leaf clusters
Army Achievement Medal with one oak leaf cluster	National Defense Service Medal with one service star	Southwest Asia Service Medal with three service stars
Iraq Campaign Medal	Global War on Terrorism Expeditionary Medal	Global War on Terrorism Service Medal
Humanitarian Service Medal	Military Outstanding Volunteer Service Medal	Army Service Ribbon
Army Overseas Service Ribbon with award numeral 4		Kuwait Liberation Medal (Saudi Arabia)
Kuwait Liberation Medal (Kuwait)
Tabs and skill badges
Ranger Tab		Jungle Tab
Senior Parachutist Badge		Air Assault Badge
Identification badges
Army Staff Identification Badge		Office of the Secretary of Defense Identification Badge
Distinctive unit insignia
506th Infantry Regiment
Unit awards
Joint Meritorious Unit Award		Valorous Unit Award
Meritorious Unit Commendation	Navy Meritorious Unit Commendation	Army Superior Unit Award
Combat Service Identification Badge
101st Airborne Division

Military offices
Preceded by Mark J. O'Neil	Chief of Staff of United States Army Pacific; 2017-2018	Succeeded by Peter B. Andrysiak
Preceded by Christopher G. Cavoli	Commanding General of the 25th Infantry Division; 2018–2019	Succeeded by James Jarrard
Preceded by Michael Minihan	Chief of Staff of the United States Indo-Pacific Command; 2019–2021	Succeeded by James Jarrard
Preceded by Terry R. Ferrell	Commanding General of United States Army Central; 2021–2022	Succeeded by Patrick D. Frank
Preceded by Randy George	Senior Military Assistant to the Secretary of Defense; 2022–2024	Succeeded by Jennifer Short
Preceded by Charles A. Flynn	Commanding General of United States Army Pacific; 2024–present	Incumbent
