= 419th Tactical Fighter Training Squadron =

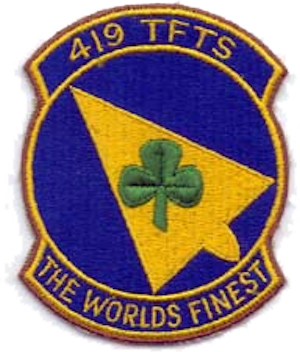
- Emblem of the 419th Tactical Fighter Training Squadron
- Active: 1969–1971
- Country: United States
- Branch: United States Air Force

The 419th Tactical Fighter Training Squadron is an inactive United States Air Force unit. It was last assigned to the 23d Tactical Fighter Wing and stationed at McConnell Air Force Base, Kansas.

== History ==
Initially established by Tactical Air Command as an F-105 training squadron in August 1967 as the provisional 4519th Combat Crew Training Squadron:. Re-designated as the AFCON 419th TFTS in October 1969, assuming the training mission of the provisional squadron. Inactivated in October 1971 with the phaseout of the F-105 at McConnell.

=== Lineage ===
- Established as 4519th Combat Crew Training Squadron and activated on 1 August 1967

Re-designated 419th Tactical Fighter Training Squadron on 15 October 1969
Inactivated on 1 October 1971

=== Assignments ===
- 23d Tactical Fighter Wing, 1 August 1967 – 1 October 1971

=== Stations ===
- McConnell AFB, Kansas, 1 August 1967 – 1 October 1971

=== Aircraft ===
- F-105 Thunderchief, 1967–1971
