= Chad Franks =

U.S. Air Force general

Chad P. Franks
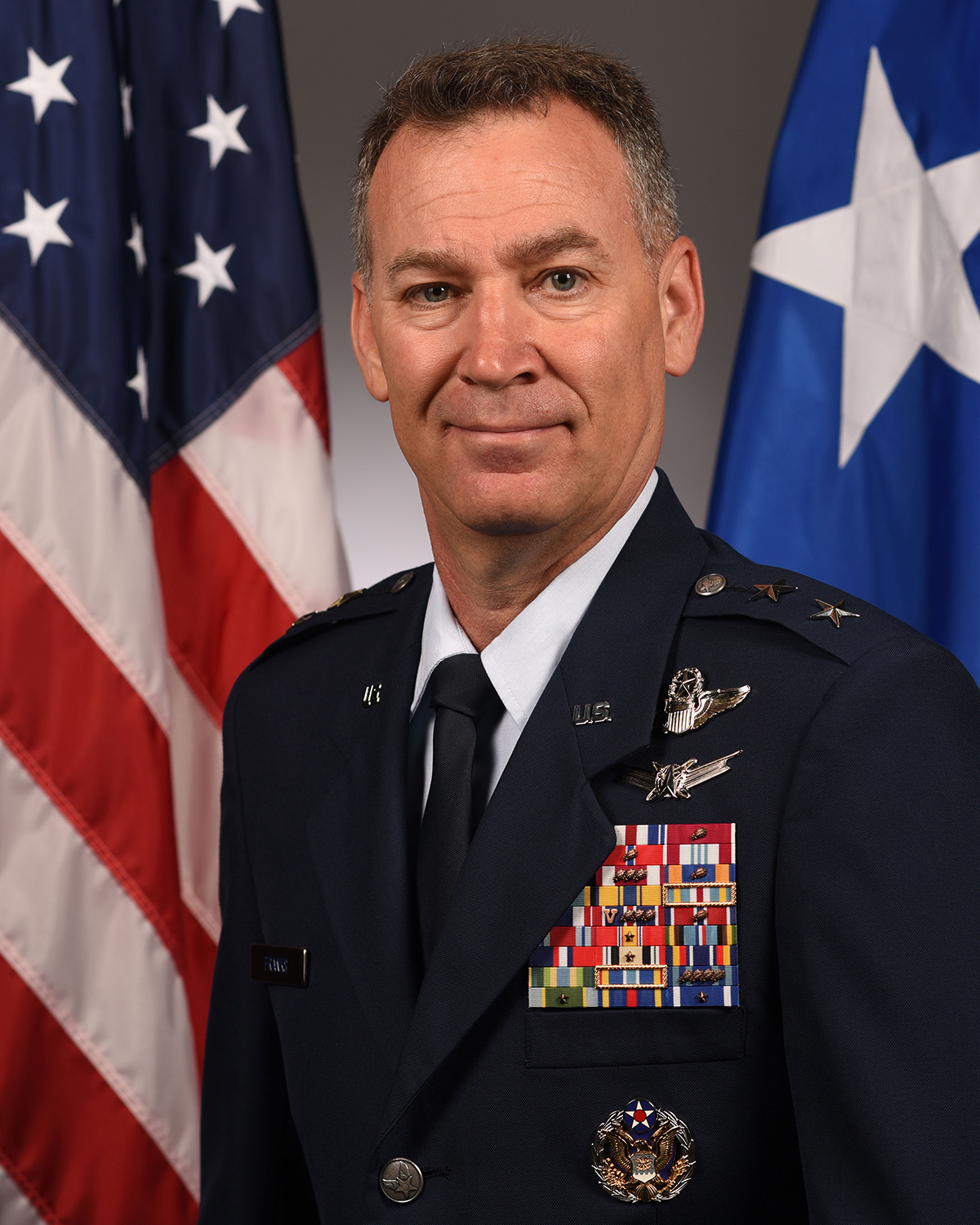
- Military career
- Allegiance: United States
- Branch: United States Air Force
- Service years: 1990–2021
- Rank: Major General
- Commands: Fifteenth Air Force; Ninth Air Force; 9th Air Expeditionary Task Force-Levant; 23rd Wing; 347th Rescue Group; 66th Rescue Squadron
- Conflicts: Iraq War
- Awards: Silver Star; Defense Superior Service Medal; Legion of Merit (3); Bronze Star Medal (2)

Chad P. Franks is a retired United States Air Force major general who last served as the commander of the Fifteenth Air Force. Previously, he was the deputy commander for operations and intelligence of the Combined Joint Task Force – Operation Inherent Resolve.

Military offices
Preceded by Billy D. Thompson	Commander of the 23rd Wing; 2013–2015	Succeeded by Thomas E. Kunkel
Preceded by Scott Zobrist	Commander of the Ninth Air Force; Fifteenth Air Force from 2020; 2019–2021	Succeeded by Michael Koscheski
