= Ninth Air Force (2009–2020) =

US Air Force unit in South Carolina

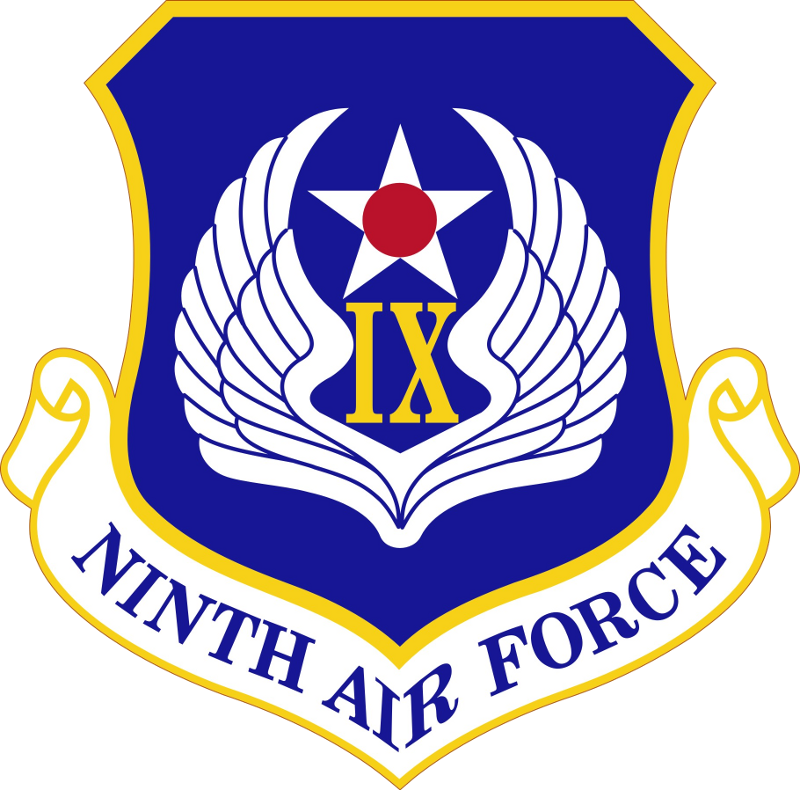
- Shield of the Ninth Air Force
- Active: 5 August 2009 – 20 August 2020 (11 years)
- Country: United States of America
- Branch: United States Air Force
- Type: Numbered Air Force
- Role: Provide combat-ready air forces to Air Combat Command
- Part of: Air Combat Command
- Headquarters: Shaw Air Force Base, South Carolina, U.S.

Commanders
- Last commander: Maj Gen Chad Franks

The Ninth Air Force (9 AF) was a numbered air force of the United States Air Force's Air Combat Command (ACC). It was headquartered at Shaw Air Force Base, South Carolina, from activation on 5 August 2009 until it was replaced by Fifteenth Air Force on 20 August 2020. The prior and current Ninth Air Force is known as United States Air Forces Central (USAFCENT). On 20 August 2020, USAFCENT was again designated Ninth Air Force in addition to United States Air Forces Central.

Until August 2009, the Ninth Air Force shared its commander with USAFCENT. In a complicated transfer of lineage, the Second World War-and-after heritage of the Ninth Air Force was bestowed solely on United States Air Forces Central, and a totally new Ninth Air Force, was activated on the U.S. East Coast, where it is responsible for a variety of Air Combat Command units.

All Ninth Air Force units, as well as units of Twelfth Air Force, were consolidated into Fifteenth Air Force on 20 August 2020 and Ninth Air Force was inactivated.

== Lineage ==
- Established as Ninth Air Force on 4 August 2009

Activated on 5 August 2009
Inactivated on 20 August 2020
Disbanded on 5 October 2020

== Assignments ==
- Air Combat Command, 5 August 2009 – 20 August 2020

== Major components ==
The command was responsible for operational readiness for eight active duty wings and two direct reporting units. These eight wings were:

- 1st Fighter Wing, Joint Base Langley–Eustis, Virginia
- 4th Fighter Wing, Seymour Johnson Air Force Base, North Carolina
- 20th Fighter Wing, Shaw Air Force Base, South Carolina
- 23rd Wing, Moody Air Force Base, Georgia
- 93rd Air-Ground Operations Wing, Moody Air Force Base, Georgia
- 325th Fighter Wing, Tyndall Air Force Base, Florida
- 461st Air Control Wing, Robins Air Force Base, Georgia
- 495th Fighter Group, Shaw Air Force Base, South Carolina
- 633rd Air Base Wing, Joint Base Langley-Eustis, Virginia

Assigned non-flying direct reporting units included:

- 800th RED HORSE Group, Nellis Air Force Base, Nevada, 1 June 2020 – 20 August 2020
- 819th RED HORSE Squadron, Malmstrom Air Force Base, Montana
- 823rd RED HORSE Squadron, Hurlburt Field, Florida

The Ninth Air Force was also responsible for overseeing the operational readiness of 30 designated units of the Air National Guard and Air Force Reserve.

== List of commanders ==
=== Commander, Ninth Air Force ===
| No. | Commander | | Term | | |
| No. | Portrait | Name | Took office | Left office | Term length |
|---|---|---|---|---|---|
| 1 | William L. Holland | Major General; William L. Holland | 5 August 2009 | 17 August 2010 | 1 year, 12 days |
| 2 | Stephen L. Hoog | Major General; Stephen L. Hoog | 17 August 2010 | 17 October 2011 | 1 year, 61 days |
| 3 | Lawrence L. Wells | Major General; Lawrence L. Wells | 17 October 2011 | 31 May 2013 | 1 year, 226 days |
| 4 | Jake Polumbo | Major General; Jake Polumbo | 31 May 2013 | 31 July 2015 | 2 years, 61 days |
| 5 | Mark D. Kelly | Major General; Mark D. Kelly | 31 July 2015 | 17 May 2016 | 291 days |
| 6 | Scott J. Zobrist | Major General; Scott J. Zobrist | 17 May 2016 | 13 June 2019 | 3 years, 27 days |
| 7 | Chad P. Franks | Major General; Chad P. Franks | 13 June 2019 | 20 August 2020 | 1 year, 68 days |
