= 23rd Wing =

23rd Wing

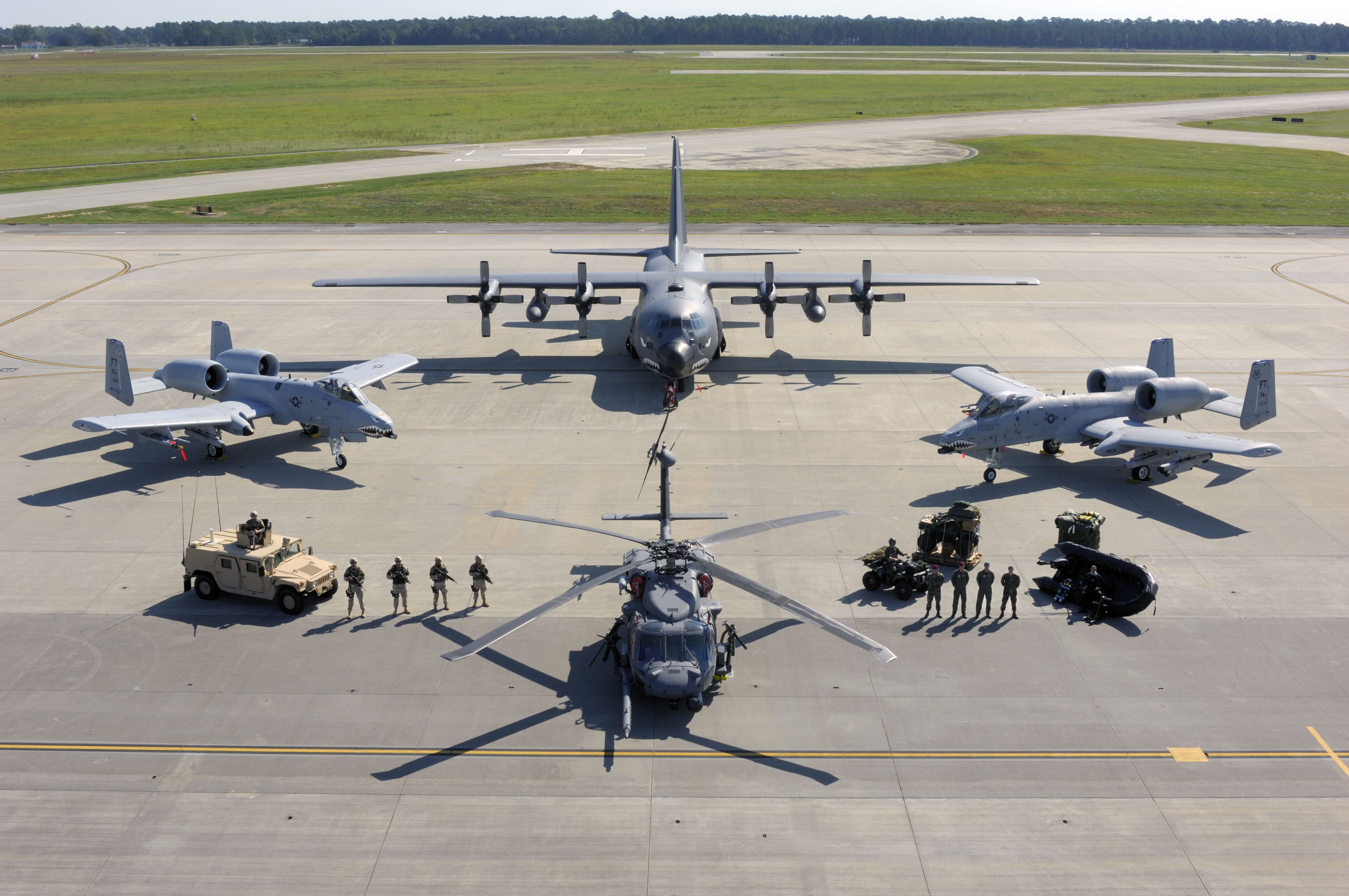
- 23rd Wing aircraft (circa 2015)
- Active: 1948–1949; 1951–1952; 1964–1992; 1992–present
- Country: United States
- Branch: United States Air Force
- Role: Close Air Support, Combat Search and Rescue
- Size: 5000 personnel
- Part of: Air Combat Command
- Garrison/HQ: Moody Air Force Base, Georgia
- Nickname: Flying Tigers
- Mottos: Attack, Rescue, Prevail. Tigers Lead
- Mascot: Tiger with Wings
- Engagements: Asia-Pacific Theater World War II; 1991 Gulf War (Defense of Saudi Arabia; Liberation of Kuwait)

- Decorations: Distinguished Unit Citation; Air Force Meritorious Unit Award; Air Force Outstanding Unit Award with Combat "V" Device; Air Force Outstanding Unit Award

Commanders
- Current commander: Colonel Sean Hall
- Deputy Commander: Colonel Russell Reese
- Command Chief: Chief Master Sergeant Matthew A. Pease
- Notable commanders: Michael Dugan; James V. Hartinger

Insignia
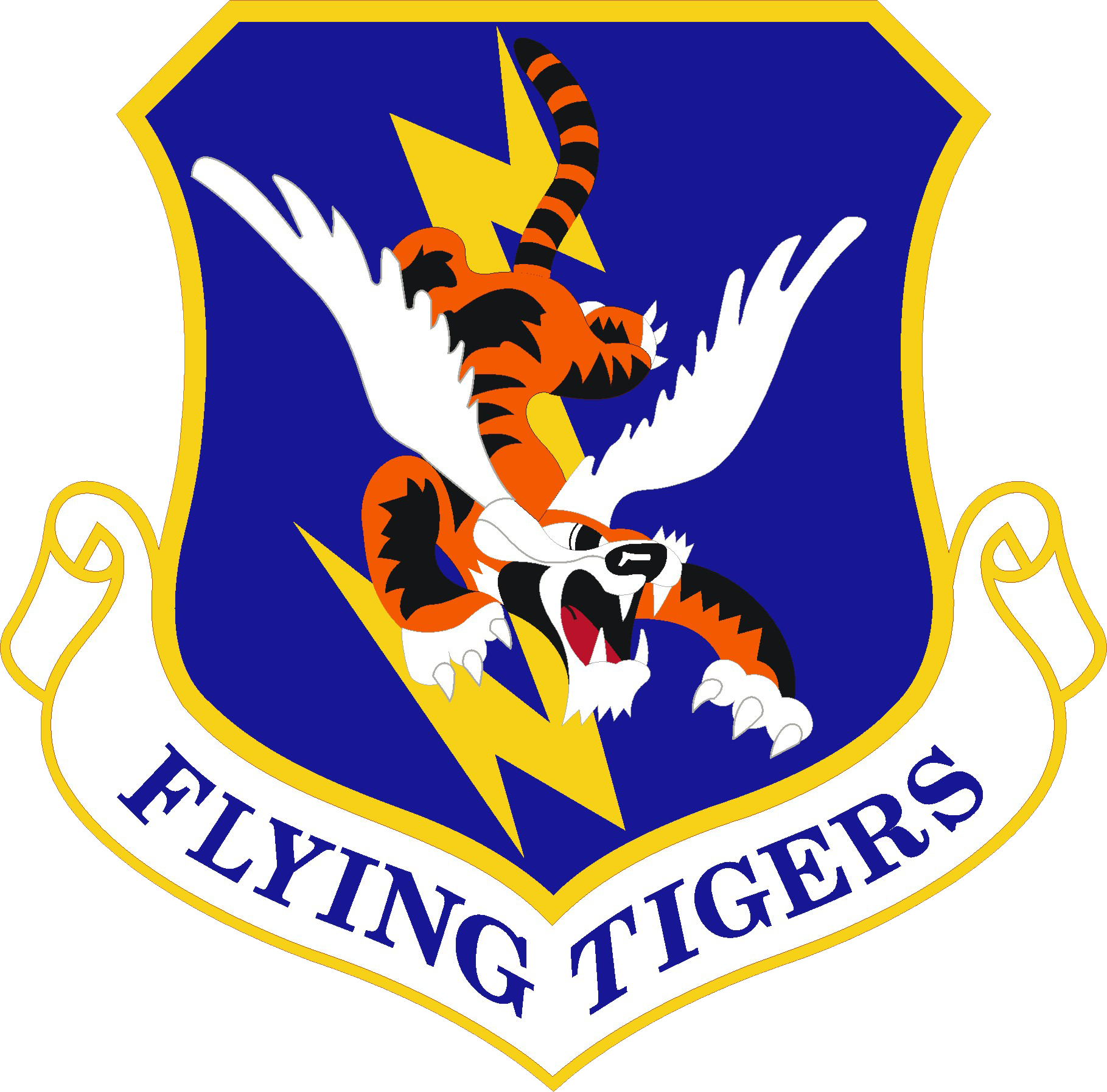
- 23rd Wing emblem (Note: Approved 24 January 1957.)

The 23rd Wing is a United States Air Force Air Combat Command wing currently stationed at Moody Air Force Base, Georgia

== Mission ==
The mission of the 23rd Wing is to organize, train and employ combat-ready Fairchild Republic A-10 Thunderbolt II, HC-130J and HH-60W, as well as pararescuemen and force protection assets. It consists of approximately 5,000 military and civilian personnel, including a geographically separated unit at Avon Park Air Force Range, Florida.

== Units ==
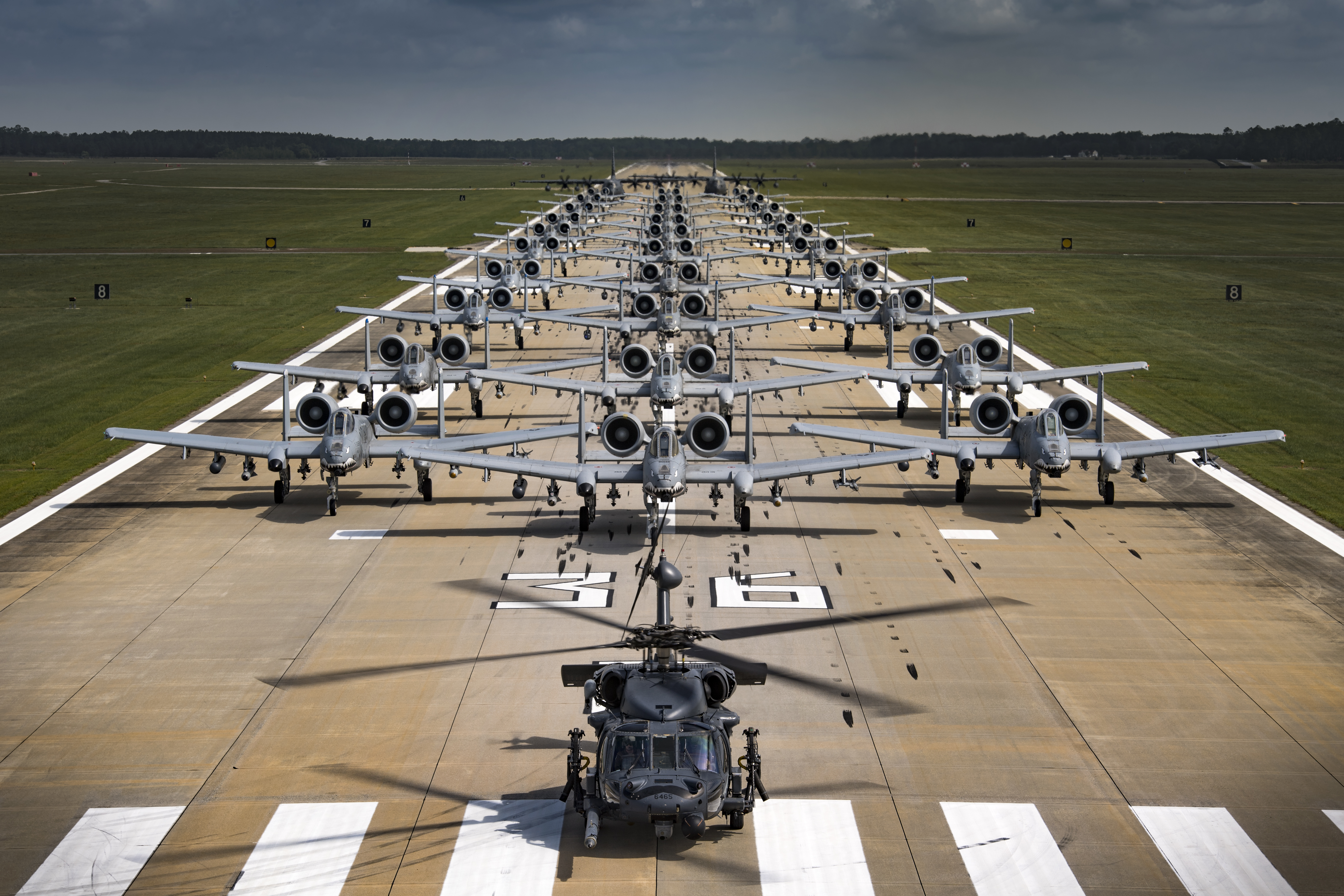
Aircraft from the 23rd Wing conducted a surge exercise 22 May 2017, at Moody Air Force Base (Note: The exercise demonstrated the wing's ability to rapidly deploy combat ready forces across the globe. The 23rd Wing maintains and operates A-10C Thunderbolt IIs, HH-60G Pave Hawks, and HC-130J Combat King II aircraft for precision attack, personnel recovery and combat support worldwide.)

The 23rd Wing consists of the following groups:

- 347th Rescue Group (HH-60W, HC-130J)

38th Rescue Squadron
41st Rescue Squadron
71st Rescue Squadron
347th Operations Support Squadron

- 23rd Fighter Group (A-10C)

74th Fighter Squadron
75th Fighter Squadron
23rd Operations Support Squadron
598th Range Squadron (MacDill Air Force Base and Avon Park Air Force Range)

- 23rd Mission Support Group

23rd Civil Engineer Squadron
23rd Communication Squadron
23rd Contracting Squadron
23rd Logistics Readiness Squadron
23rd Force Support Squadron
23rd Security Forces Squadron

- 23rd Medical Group

23rd Healthcare Operations Squadron
23rd Operational Medical Readiness Squadron

- 23rd Maintenance Group

23rd Munitions Squadron
23rd Maintenance Squadron
41st Rescue Generation Squadron
71st Rescue Generation Squadron
74th Fighter Generation Squadron
75th Fighter Generation Squadron

- 23rd Comptroller Squadron

== History ==
=== Postwar era ===
The 23rd Fighter Wing was activated on 10 August 1948 at Northwest Guam Air Force Base, Guam as part of the Wing-Base organization plan, which prescribed a standard organizational setup for all USAF bases worldwide. The plan called for the creation of a wing headquarters that established policy and supervised four functional groups: an operational group, an air base group, a maintenance and supply group, and a medical group. The 23rd Fighter Group was assigned as the operational group under the new 23rd Fighter Wing. The wing was assigned to Twentieth Air Force.

The 23rd's mission on Guam was to provide air defense of the island. The 23rd Fighter Group was assigned the 74th, 75th and 76th Fighter Squadrons, being equipped with Republic P-47 Thunderbolts.

The 23rd Fighter Wing moved to Howard Air Force Base, Panama Canal Zone, in April 1949, where it also acquired a squadron of Lockheed RF-80 Shooting Stars. The 23rd Fighter Wing conducted air defense of the Canal Zone under the Caribbean Air Command until it was again inactivated on 24 September 1949.

=== Air Defense Command ===
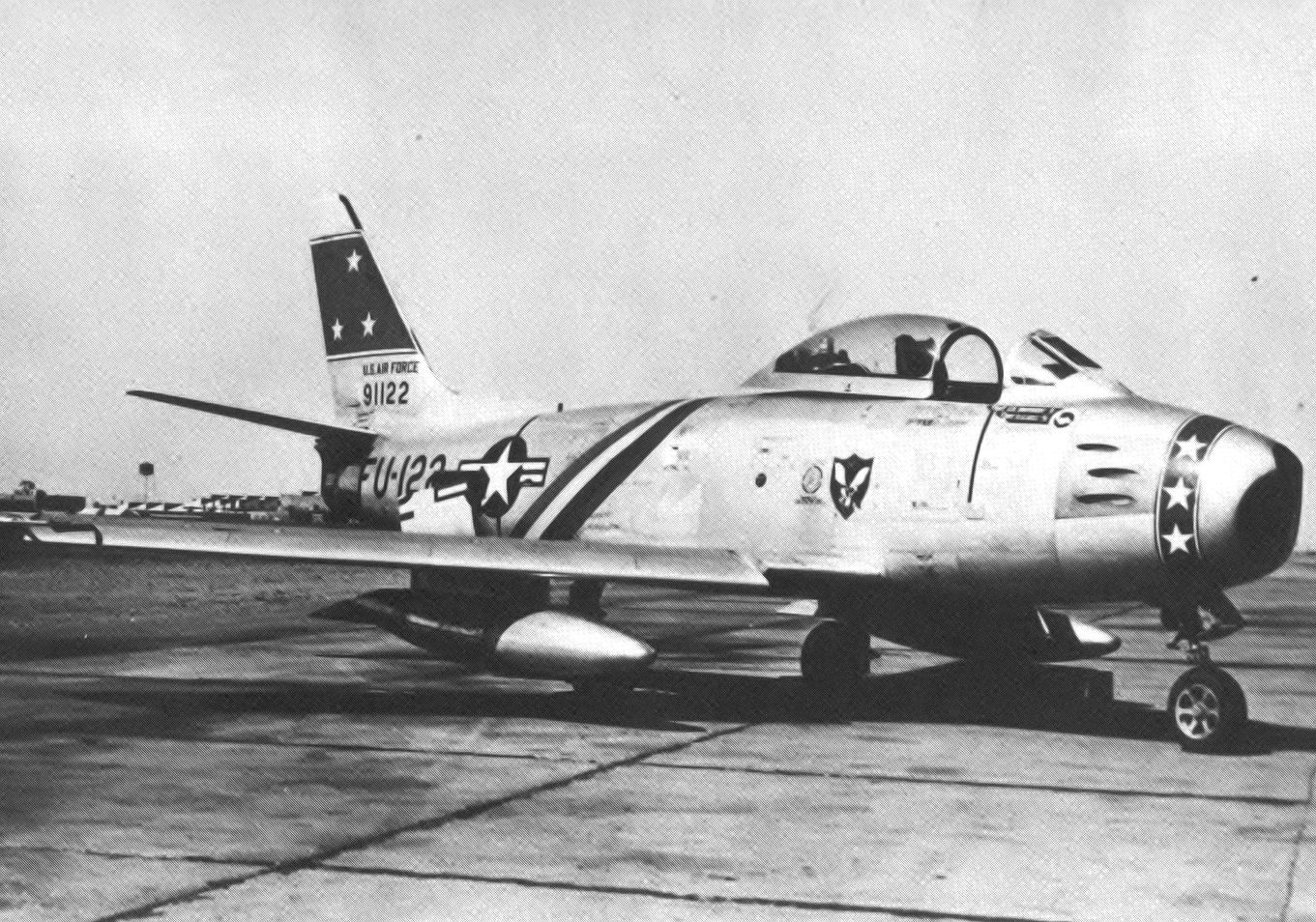
23rd Fighter-Interceptor Wing F-86A Sabre (Note: Aircraft is North American F-86A-5-NA Sabre, serial 49-1122 at Presque Isle AFB, Maine, 1952 marked as the Wing Commander's aircraft.)

Reactivated on 12 January 1951, at Presque Isle Air Force Base, Maine, the wing was redesignated the 23rd Fighter-Interceptor Wing with the 74th and 75th Fighter-Interceptor Squadrons assigned, as part of the Air Defense Command (ADC). Equipped with North American F-86 Sabre, North American F-51 Mustang, Northrop F-89D Scorpion and F-80 Shooting Star aircraft, its mission was to provide air defense for the northeastern United States during the Korean War and conduct basic training for about 500 Air Force recruits. The 23rd was inactivated 6 February 1952 along with the 23rd Fighter-Interceptor Group. The Wing's equipment and personnel were transferred to the 4711th Defense Wing, which had been organized at Presque Isle on 1 February 1952.

=== Tactical Air Command ===
==== McConnell Air Force Base ====
Following its longest period of inactivation, the wing was organized as the 23rd Tactical Fighter Wing on 8 February 1964, at McConnell Air Force Base, Kansas, under Tactical Air Command and Twelfth Air Force. The wing was activated to replace the 388th Tactical Fighter Wing at McConnell after the 388th deployed to Korat Royal Thai Air Force Base, Thailand. The 23rd assumed command of the 388th's squadrons at McConnell:

- 419th Tactical Fighter Training Squadron (15 October 1969 – 8 May 1971)
- 560th Tactical Fighter Squadron (28 January 1964 – 25 September 1968)
- 561st Tactical Fighter Squadron
- 562nd Tactical Fighter Squadron
- 563rd Tactical Fighter Squadron
- 4519th Combat Crew Training Squadron (later 4519th Tactical Fighter Training Squadron) (1 August 1967 – 16 October 1969) (Note: Squadron markings on the natural metal / silver lacquered aircraft included the following: 561 TFS – black/yellow checkerboarding on rudder; 562 TFS – a red, white and black "sharkmouth" on the nose of the aircraft; 563rd Squadron red and white stripes on the rudder, wingtips and stabilizers with a white band on the top of the vertical fin. When Southeast Asian camouflaged, the squadrons carried the following tail codes: 561st MD; 562d ME; 563d TFS MF, and the 4519th and 419th MG.)

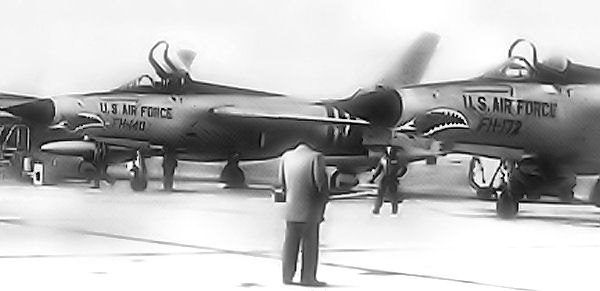
F-105Ds of the 562nd Tactical Fighter Squadron, deployed from McConnel AFB, KS to Southeast Asia (Thailand), 1965

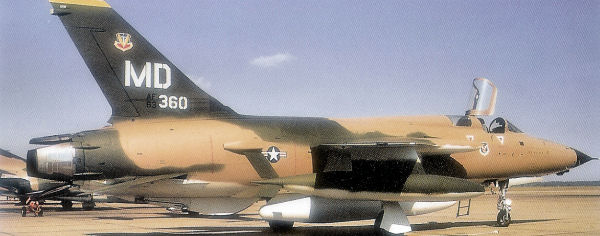
561st Tactical Fighter Squadron, F-105F at McConnell in 1970 (Note: Aircraft is Republic F-105F-1-RE Thunderchief, serial 63-8360. This aircraft was later converted to the F-105G Wild Weasel configuration. It was hit by flak over North Vietnam on 17 September 1972 and crashed at sea.)

Flying the Republic F-105 Thunderchief aircraft, the mission of the 23d at McConnell was to provide training for "Thud" pilots prior to their deployment to Southeast Asia. The 560th acted as a combat training squadron, while the other three squadrons began rotational TDY deployments to Southeast Asia beginning in November 1964.

In February 1965, when the 23d deployed three squadrons (the 561st, 562nd and 563rd) to Southeast Asia for combat, these units were initially under the control of the 2nd Air Division. Later, the 6441 Tactical Fighter Wing was organized at Takhli Royal Thai Air Force Base in July 1965, taking control of the 23rd's squadrons deployed there. It was during this five-month tour that the 563rd lost 10 of its 18 F-105's deployed and was awarded two Air Force Outstanding Unit Awards with Combat "V". In addition to the deployments to Thailand, detachments of the 561 TFS also deployed to Da Nang Air Base Viet Nam for operations within the borders of the Republic of Vietnam.

On 1 August 1967, the 4519th Combat Crew Training squadron was added to the 23rd, and the 560th Tactical Fighter Squadron was inactivated on 25 September 1968.

The wing maintained proficiency in tactical fighter operations, and later also functioned as an F-105 replacement training unit and assisted Air National Guard units in their conversion to the F-105 when the Thunderchief left first-line service. For the dual role it played from June 1970 to June 1971 as both an operational and a training unit, the wing received the Air Force Outstanding Unit Award in March 1971. Two of its squadrons, the 562nd and 563rd, also received the same award for their duty in Vietnam during 1965, but with the combat "V" added, the 563rd receiving two such awards in a five-month period. For its participation in Linebacker I and Linebacker II during 1972 the 561st (Wild Weasels) received the Air Force Outstanding Unit Award with Combat "V".

During combat operations in Southeast Asia, the 562d lost three aircraft, while the 563d lost eleven aircraft.

On 1 July 1972 the 23d move to England Air Force Base Louisiana and the wing's squadrons were assigned to the 35th Tactical Fighter Wing at George Air Force Base California.

==== England Air Force Base ====
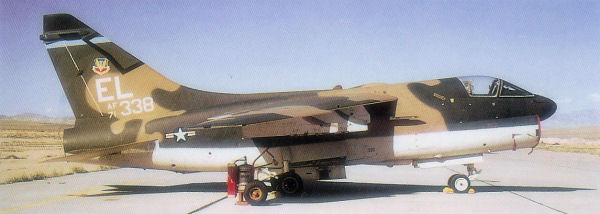
A-7D Corsair II of the 75th Tactical Fighter Squadron (Note: Ling-Temco-Vought A-7D-11-CV Corsair II, serial 71-0338, taken in May 1973.)

The 23rd Tactical Fighter Wing moved without personnel or equipment to England Air Force Base, Louisiana, 1 July 1972 and took over the assets and personnel of the 4403rd Tactical Fighter Wing. Assigned to the Ninth Air Force, the wing activated all three of its original World War II fighter units – the 74th, 75th and 76th Tactical Fighter Squadrons for the first time since 1949, and began operations with the Ling-Temco-Vought A-7D Corsair II aircraft. (Note: Squadron markings were a blue tail stripe, later adding white stars and a "74" in 1979 for the 74th; a white outlined black tail stripe, later changed to black and white checkered for the 75th, and a red tail stripe with white stars and a "76" for the 76th. All wing aircraft carried the "EL" tail code at England.)

On 5 July 1973, the 74th Tactical Fighter Squadron deployed to Korat Royal Thai Air Force Base, Thailand, on temporary duty with the 354th Tactical Fighter Wing (Deployed) from Myrtle Beach Air Force Base, South Carolina. The 74th replaced the 354th Tactical Fighter Squadron from Davis-Monthan Air Force Base, Arizona that had completed its temporary duty. For just over a month, until the cessation of all U.S. bombing on 15 August 1973, the 74th supported the air war activities in Cambodia, accounting for the destruction of 311 enemy structures, 25 ground artillery and missile sites, three bridges and 9,500 cubic meters of supplies. The 74th returned to England on 28 December 1973.

The 23d took part in a variety of operational exercises both in the United States and overseas, including tactical bombing competitions against the Royal Air Force at RAF Lossiemouth, Scotland, during October 1977 and July 1978. In both events, A-7D teams captured the Sir John Mogg Team Trophy.

On 23 September 1980, the 74th Squadron received the wing's first operational Fairchild Republic A-10 Thunderbolt II aircraft. The 75 and 76 TFS received A-10s within the next few months, and the 23d took top honors in Ninth Air Force's tactical bombing competition (Gunpowder 1981) in July, and advanced to TAC's worldwide Gunsmoke 1981 competition at Nellis Air Force Base, Nevada, in September. The Flying Tigers won six of nine events, including top maintenance and munitions awards, and was the top A-10 unit in the competition. The wing's maintenance complex was also awarded the 1981 Daedalian runner-up trophy, and earned the 1984 Daedalian Aircraft Maintenance Trophy.

Eight of the 23rd's A-7Ds were transferred to the 4450th Tactical Group, based at Nellis Air Force Base, Nevada in June 1981, during the transition to the A-10. The 4451st Tactical Squadron at Tonopah Test Range Airport used these aircraft to train F-117 Nighthawk pilots and to provide a cover story for F-117A development.

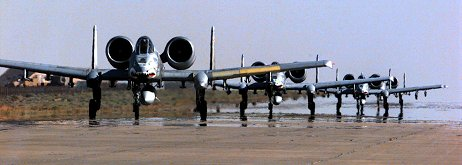
A-10s on the flightline.

Operation Urgent Fury, Grenada, Oct/Nov 1983 the 76th Fighter Squadron deployed to Roosevelt Roads Naval station in Puerto Rico, from where it flew combat missions in support of this operation.

The wing set Air Force records for "mission capable" and "fully mission capable" (meaning an aircraft can meet any mission tasking) rates during fiscal year 1985. The marks, 93.1 percent in MC and 92.8 percent in FMC, topped records set by the wing in 1981, 1982, 1983 and 1984. The wing earned its fourth Air Force Outstanding Unit Award for the period 1 April 1989, to 31 March 1991.

==== Operations Desert Shield and Desert Storm ====
In response to the buildup of forces following the Iraqi Invasion of Kuwait in August 1990, the 74th and 76th Tactical Fighter Squadrons deployed with numerous support personnel, to include pilots and maintainers from the 75th Tactical Fighter Squadron to King Fahd International Airport, Saudi Arabia, attached to the 354th Tactical Fighter Wing (Provisional) as part of Operation Desert Shield. The A-10 deployment was the largest ever fielded. A total of 144 A/OA-10 aircraft were deployed.

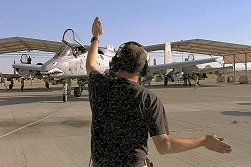
A 23rd Fighter Group member directs traffic in the desert.

Using forward operating locations near the Kuwaiti border as well as King Fahd Air Base, A-10s made their combat debut in Operation Desert Storm on 17 January 1991. The 23 TFW flew more than 2,700 combat sorties over Iraq and Kuwait while maintaining a mission-capable rate of 95 percent. In addition to providing close air support for ground units, the A-10s performed combat search and rescue and SCUD-hunting missions. The combined efforts of the A-10 units resulted in the confirmed destruction of 987 tanks, 926 artillery pieces, 500 armored personnel carriers, 1,106 trucks, 112 military structures, 96 radars, 72 bunkers, 57 SCUD missile launchers, 50 anti-aircraft artillery batteries, 28 command posts, 11 FROG missiles, nine surface-to-air missile sites, eight fuel tanks and 12 aircraft.

Both squadrons returned to England Air Force Base at the end of March 1991. Support personnel continued to arrive for months after the aircraft redeployment. In October 1990, the Base Realignment and Closure Commission decided that England Air Force Base would be closed by September 1992. A draw down of equipment and personnel began almost immediately.

On 1 October 1991, as part of an Air Force-wide reorganization, the wing became 23rd Fighter Wing, and on 1 November 1991, the squadrons also dropped "tactical" from their designations. On 2 December 1991, the 75th Fighter Squadron was inactivated. The 74th was inactivated on 13 February 1992, and the 76th on 29 May. The 23rd Fighter Wing's A-10 aircraft were sent to Air National Guard units, and the wing was inactivated on 1 June 1992. England was closed the same day.

=== Air Combat Command ===
==== Pope Air Force Base ====
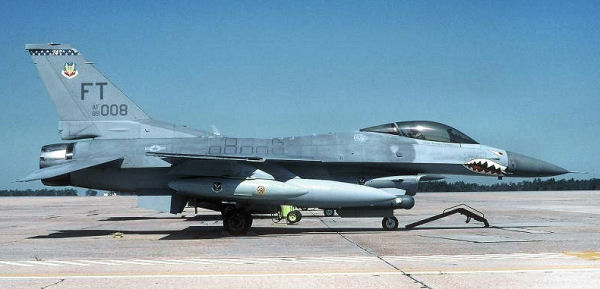
"Flying Tiger" General Dynamics F-16C Block 40E Fighting Falcon, AF Serial No. 89-2008, of the 74th Fighter Squadron.

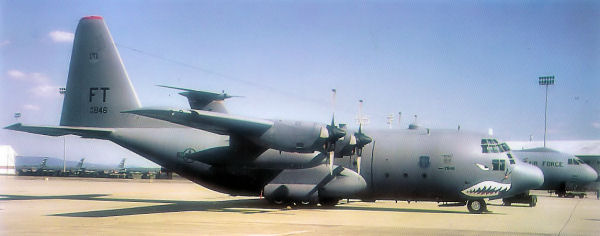
"Flying Tiger" Lockheed C-130E-LM Hercules, AF Serial No. 63-7846, of the 41st Airlift Squadron.

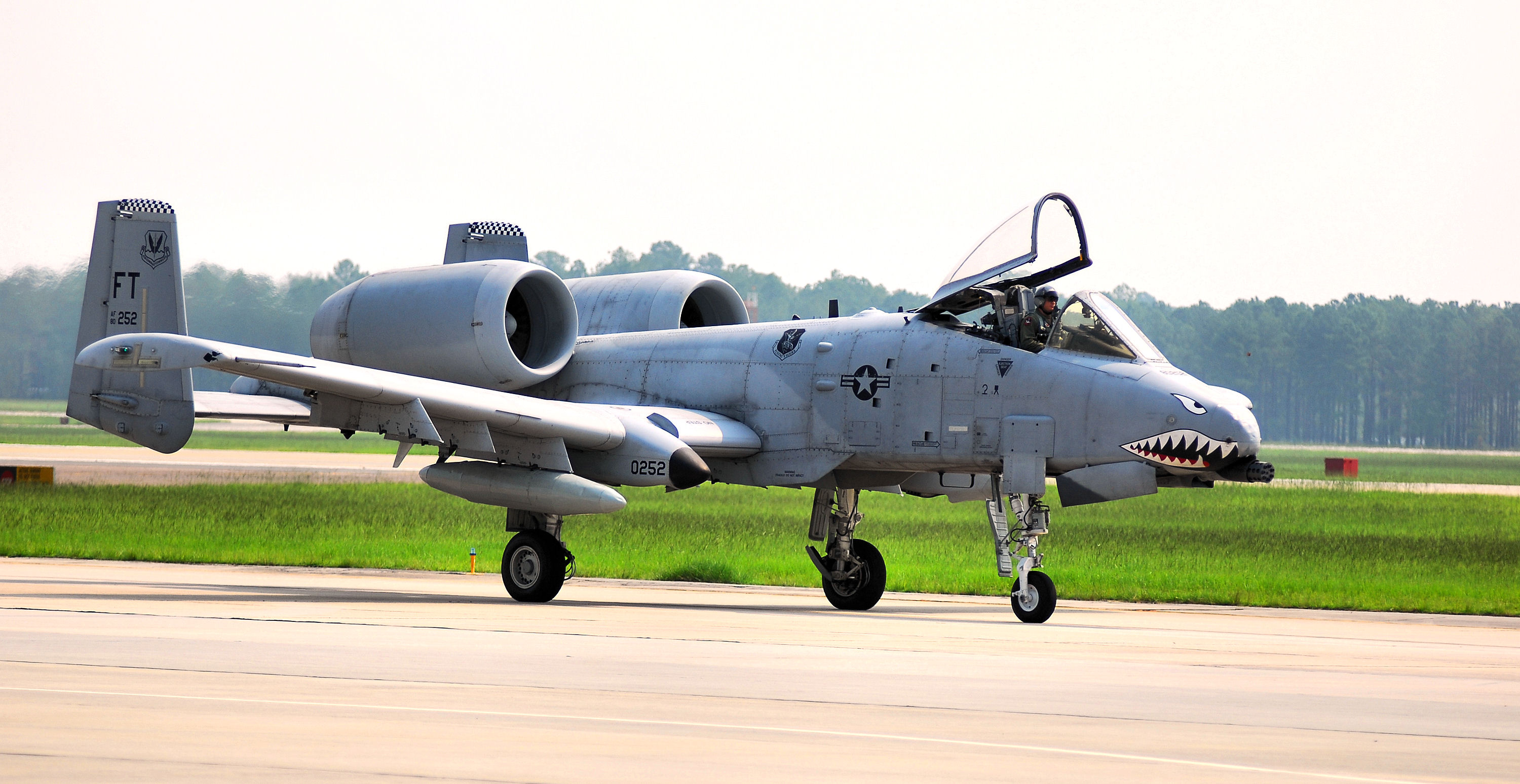
Fairchild Republic A-10A Thunderbolt II Serial 80-0252 of the 75th Fighter Squadron.

The collapse of the Soviet Union in 1991 and the end of Cold War tensions led senior defense planners to conclude that the structure of the military establishment which had evolved during the Cold War years was not suited to the new world situation. Senior planners reviewed numerous options before agreeing on the final conclusion—a merger of most strategic and tactical air resources and a reorganization of Military Airlift Command (MAC). In addition, the number of Air Force wings was to be reduced by about one-third to reflect the financial constraints of the post Cold War environment.

These changes led to Pope Air Force Base being transferred to the new Air Combat Command upon the command's activation on 1 June 1992. Also, the existing 317th Airlift Wing at Pope was blended with the newly activated 23rd Operations Group (last assigned to the wing in 1952 as the 23rd Fighter-Interceptor Group) into the new 23rd Wing on 1 June 1992.

In April 1992, A/OA-10 Thunderbolt II aircraft were transferred to the 75th Fighter Squadron from the 353rd Fighter Squadron of the 354th Fighter Wing at Myrtle Beach Air Force Base prior to the wing's inactivation and the 1993 Base Realignment and Closure Commission-mandated closure of Myrtle Beach in January 1993. In June 1993, General Dynamics F-16 Fighting Falcons were transferred to the 74th Fighter Squadron from the 347th Fighter Wing at Moody Air Force Base, Georgia and the 388th Fighter Wing at Hill Air Force Base, Utah.

Operational squadrons of the 23rd Wing at Pope were:

- 317th Airlift Group
  - 2nd Airlift Squadron (C-130E) (1 June 1992 – 1 April 1997)
  - 41st Airlift Squadron (C-130E) (16 July 1993 – 1 April 1997)
- 23rd Fighter Group
  - 74th Tactical Fighter Squadron (15 June 1993 – 1 April 1997)
    (F-16C/D 15 June 1993 – 30 June 1996), (A/OA-10A 1 July 1996 – 1 April 1997)
  - 75th Tactical Fighter Squadron (1 April 1992 – 1 April 1997) (A/OA-10A)
- 18th Air Support Group (Note: All aircraft of the 23rd Wing at Pope carried the tail code "FT" (Flying Tigers).)

In December 1992, Lockheed C-130 Hercules aircraft from the 2nd Airlift Squadron deployed to Mombasa, Kenya, to participate in Operation Provide Relief. The aircraft and crews delivered tons of food and other relief supplies to small airstrips throughout Somalia. 23rd Wing C-130s have also been tasked to assist in other humanitarian relief efforts, to include Hurricane Andrew in Florida. They also airdropped relief supplies into Bosnia and Herzegovina and flew relief missions into Sarajevo for more than 28 months.

In September 1994, its C-130s participated in what was to be the largest combat personnel drop since World War II, Operation Uphold Democracy. They were to assist in dropping more than 3,000 paratroopers from the 82nd Airborne Division onto Port au Prince Airport, Haiti. The invasion force was recalled at the last minute after word that the Haitian president had resigned upon hearing that the aircraft were on their way. The 75th Fighter Squadron's A-10s were deployed their aircraft to Shaw Air Force Base, South Carolina, where they were scheduled to launch close air support operations for the invasion force before recovering in Puerto Rico.

The first operational deployment of a composite wing happened in October 1994, when Iraqi troops began massing near the Kuwaiti Border. Within 72 hours, 56 aircraft and 1,500 personnel deployed to the Persian Gulf region for Operation Vigilant Warrior. Eventually, the 75th Fighter Squadron redeployed to Al Jaber Air Base, Kuwait, becoming the first U.S. fixed-wing aircraft to be stationed in that country since the end of the Gulf War.

On 1 July 1996, the 74th Fighter Squadron's F-16C/D Fighting Falcons were transferred to the 27th Fighter Wing's 524th Fighter Squadron at Cannon Air Force Base, New Mexico, and the squadron transitioned to A/OA-10 Thunderbolt IIs received from the 20th Fighter Wing's 55th Fighter Squadron at Shaw Air Force Base. This gave the 23rd Group a 2nd A-10 squadron.

On 1 April 1997, the 23rd Wing was downsized and redesignated as the 23rd Fighter Group. The 23rd Operations Group was inactivated and its fighter squadrons assigned to the 23 Fighter Group. The 23rd remained at Pope as an operations group assigned to Air Combat Command 347th Wing at Moody Air Force Base, Georgia. The C-130s formerly assigned to the 23rd and Pope Air Force Base were realigned to Air Mobility Command under the 43rd Airlift Wing.

On 27 June 2000, the 23rd Fighter Group was reassigned to the 4th Fighter Wing at Seymour Johnson Air Force Base North Carolina and continued to operate from Pope, after the 347th Wing was redesignated the 347th Rescue Wing. The group as it existed in 2006 consisted of the:

- 74th Fighter Squadron
- 75th Fighter Squadron
- 23rd Operations Support Squadron
- 23rd Maintenance Squadron

===== Operation Allied Force =====
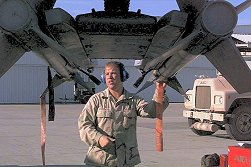
A 23rd Fighter Group member inspects two AIM-9 Sidewinder missiles on an aircraft in the desert.

In April 1999, the 74 FS deployed five aircraft and 60 personnel to Operation Allied Force, the NATO air campaign against the Federal Republic of Yugoslavia, intended to stop ethnic cleansing of Albanians by Serbs. The US participation was known as Operation Noble Anvil and officially spanned 24 March 1999 – 10 June 1999. The 74th FS deployed initially to Spangdahlem Air Base, Germany and then forward deployed to Gioia del Colle Air Base, Italy. Designated the 74th Expeditionary Fighter Squadron, the unit co-located with the 81st Expeditionary Fighter Squadron of the 51st Fighter Wing to form an expeditionary fighter wing.

The A-10A aircraft provided close air support during missions over the region, provided short-notice alert for combat search and rescue missions and also provided airborne forward air control for NATO fighters attacking Serbian targets found in the Kosovo area.

===== Operation Enduring Freedom =====
In March 2002, the 23rd Fighter Group landed the first fighter aircraft inside Afghanistan. They deployed from Al Jaber Air Base, Kuwait, to Bagram Air Base, Afghanistan. 23rd Fighter Group personnel operated simultaneously in support of Operation Enduring Freedom and Operation Southern Watch for nearly seven months.

===== Operation Iraqi Freedom =====
In February 2003, the 23rd Fighter Group deployed to Al Jaber Air Base in preparation of Operation Iraqi Freedom, there they launched aircraft to attack Baghdad until the major fighting ceased. They then deployed forward to Tallil Air Base, near An-Nasiriyah.

===== Milestones =====
In 2002, an A-10 of the 75th Fighter Squadron passed the 9,000 flying-hour mark, becoming the most flown attack aircraft in Air Force history. This was exceeded in 2005 by another A-10 from the 75th FS that passed the 10,000 flying-hour mark.

==== Moody Air Force Base ====
On 29 September 2006, the 347th Rescue Wing at Moody redesignated as the 347th Rescue Group, while the 23rd Fighter Group was redesignated the 23rd Wing. The 23rd Wing has three operations groups, the 347th Rescue Group, along with the original 23rd Fighter Group (last assigned to the wing at Pope AFB as the 23rd Operations Group), and the 563rd Rescue Group at Davis-Monthan AFB, Arizona and Nellis AFB, Nevada.

The 23rd Fighter Group was reassigned to the 23rd Wing as a second operations group at Moody AFB in a ceremony held on 18 August 2006. The 23rd Fighter Group transferred its personnel and equipment from Pope AFB in December 2007 with that installation's transfer to the U.S. Army and redesignation as Pope Field. There are currently two operational active duty A-10C squadrons at Moody AFB plus one Air Force Reserve associate squadron. In addition, twelve additional A-10 aircraft from the 355th Fighter Squadron of the 354th Fighter Wing at Eielson Air Force Base, Alaska were transferred to the 23rd Fighter Group as a result of BRAC 2005.

On 1 October 2018, the 563rd Rescue Group realigned under the 355th Wing at Davis-Monthan AFB. At this time, the 23rd Wing consisted of two operational groups: 23rd Fighter Group and the 347th Rescue Group.

On 1 July 2021, the 23rd Munitions Squadron activated and aligned under the 23rd Maintenance Group.

The 23rd Wing inactivated the 23rd Aircraft Maintenance Squadron on 14 January 2022 whilst at the same time activating the 74th and 75th Fighter Generation Squadrons. The move was part of Air Combat Command's plans to improve the alignment of fighter operations and maintenance.

== Lineage ==
- Constituted as the 23rd Fighter Wing on 10 August 1948

Activated on 16 August 1948
Inactivated on 24 September 1949
Redesignated 23rd Fighter-Interceptor Wing on 19 December 1950
Activated on 12 January 1951
Inactivated on 6 February 1952

- Redesignated 23rd Tactical Fighter Wing and activated on 28 January 1964

Organized on 8 February 1964
Redesignated 23rd Fighter Wing on 1 October 1991
Inactivated on 1 June 1992

- Redesignated 23rd Wing and activated on 1 June 1992

Redesignated 23rd Fighter Group on 1 April 1997
Redesignated 23rd Wing on 1 October 2006

=== Assignments ===
- Twentieth Air Force, 16 August 1948
- Caribbean Air Command, 25 – 24 April September 1949
- Eastern Air Defense Force, 12 January 1951 – 6 February 1952
- Air Defense Command, 7 February 1952
- 32nd Air Division, 16 February 1953 – 1 March 1956
- Tactical Air Command, 28 January 1964 (not organized)
- Twelfth Air Force, 8 February 1964
- 835th Air Division, 1 July 1964
- Twelfth Air Force, 30 June 1971
- Ninth Air Force, 1 July 1972
- 347th Wing, 1 April 1997
- 4th Fighter Wing, 23 June 2000
- Ninth Air Force (later, Ninth Air Force [Air Forces Central]), 1 October 2006 – 5 August 2009
- Ninth Air Force (a separate, different formation from the above Ninth Air Force) 5 August 2009 – 20 August 2020
- Fifteenth Air Force, 20 August 2020 – present

=== Components ===
Groups

- 23rd Fighter Group (later 23rd Fighter-Interceptor Group 23rd Operations Group, 23rd Fighter Group): 16 August 1948 – 24 September 1949; 12 January 1951 – 6 February 1952; 1 June 1992 – 1 April 1997; 1 October 2006 – present
- 347th Rescue Group: 1 October 2006 – present
- 563rd Rescue Group: 1 October 2006 – 30 September 2018

Squadrons

- 6th Special Operations Training Squadron: 1 – 15 January September 1974
- 74th Tactical Fighter Squadron (later 74th Fighter Squadron): 1 July 1972 – 15 February 1992 (detached 2 – 28 July December 1973; 29 August 1990 – 20 April 1991); 1 April 1997 – 1 October 2006
- 75th Tactical Fighter Squadron (later 75th Fighter Squadron): 1 July 1972 – 2 December 1991; 1 – 1 April June 1992; 1 April 1997 – 1 October 2006.
- 76th Tactical Fighter Squadron (later 76th Fighter Squadron): 1 October 1972 – 29 May 1992 (detached 27 August 1990 – c. April 1991)
- 132nd Fighter-Interceptor Squadron: attached 21 July 1951 – 6 February 1952
- 134th Fighter-Interceptor Squadron: attached 1 April 1951 – 6 February 1952
- 333rd Tactical Fighter Squadron: 15 October 1970 – 22 March 1971
- 357th Tactical Fighter Squadron: attached c. 8 November 1965 – 28 January 1966; assigned 15 – 22 March 1971
- 419th Tactical Fighter Training Squadron: 15 October 1969 – 1 October 1971
- 560th Tactical Fighter Squadron: 8 February 1964 – 25 September 1968
- 561st Tactical Fighter Squadron: 8 February 1964 – 1 July 1972 (detached 6 – 10 March July 1965 and 9 – 30 April June 1972)
- 562nd Tactical Fighter Squadron: 8 February 1964 – 1 July 1972 (detached 13 – 6 August December 1965)
- 563rd Tactical Fighter Squadron: 8 February 1964 – 1 July 1972 (detached 8 – 15 April August 1965)
- 598th Range Squadron: 22 September 2015 – Present
- 4519th Combat Crew Training Squadron: 1 August 1967 – 15 October 1969

Detachments and Operating Locations

- Detachment 1, Deployed Unit Complex (DUC), MacDill Air Force Base, Florida
  - Redesignated as 598th Range Squadron, 25 September 2015
- Detachment 1, Avon Park Air Force Range, Florida
  - Redesignated as 598th Range Squadron, 25 September 2015

=== Stations ===
- Northwest Guam Air Force Base, Guam, 16 August 1948 – 3 April 1949
- Howard Air Force Base, Panama Canal Zone, 25 – 24 April September 1949
- Presque Isle Air Force Base, Maine, 12 January 1951 – 6 February 1952
- McConnell Air Force Base, Kansas, 8 February 1964
- England Air Force Base, Louisiana, 1 July 1972 – 1 June 1992
- Pope Air Force Base, North Carolina, 1 June 1992 – 1 April 1997
- Moody Air Force Base, Georgia, 1 October 2006 – present
