= 355th Fighter Squadron =

United States Air Force unit

355th Fighter Squadron

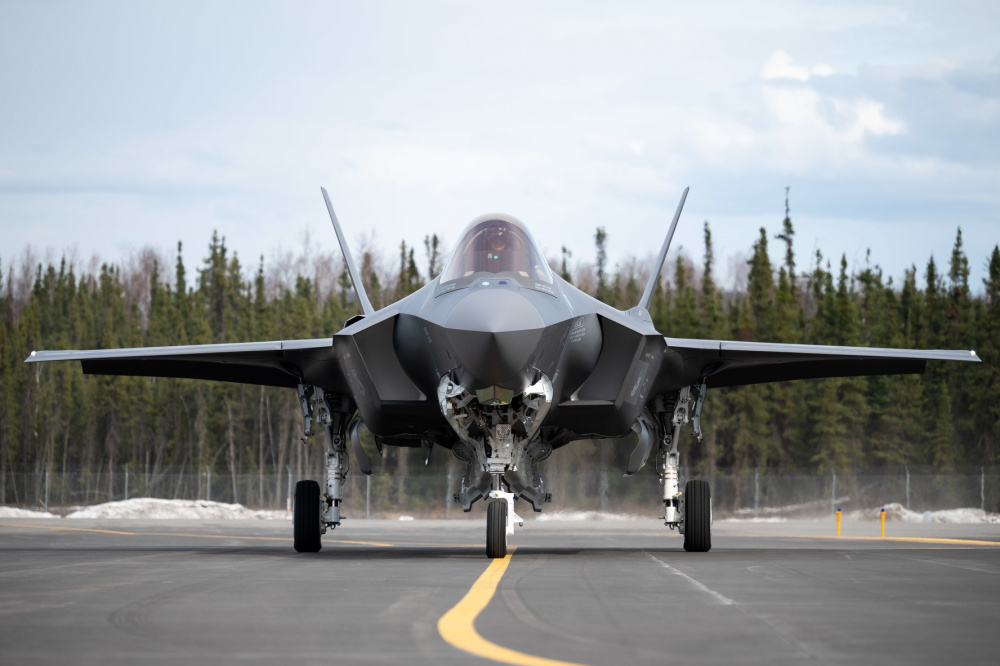
- F-35 Lightning II of the 355th Fighter Squadron at Eielson Air Force Base
- Active: 1942–1946; 1956–1970; 1970–1992; 1993–2007; 5 Oct 2015–2019; 2020–present
- Country: United States
- Branch: United States Air Force
- Role: Fighter, Wild Weasel
- Part of: Pacific Air Forces
- Garrison/HQ: Eielson Air Force Base
- Nickname: Fightin' Falcons
- Motto: Talons Out!
- Equipment: F-35A Lightning II
- Engagements: European Theater of Operations; Vietnam War; Gulf War; Operation Joint Guard; Operation Southern Watch; Operation Desert Fox; Operation Enduring Freedom; War in Afghanistan
- Decorations: Distinguished Unit Citation; Presidential Unit Citation; Air Force Outstanding Unit Award; French Croix de Guerre with Palm; Vietnamese Gallantry Cross with Palm

Insignia
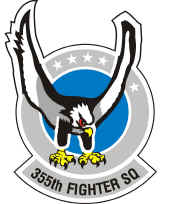
- 355th Fighter Squadron emblem (Note: Approved 25 June 1957.)

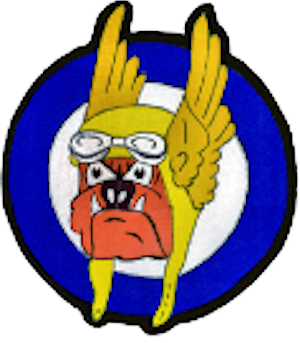
- 355th Fighter Squadron emblem (Note: Approved 10 April 1943.)

The 355th Fighter Squadron, nicknamed the Fightin' Falcons, is a United States Air Force unit stationed at Eielson Air Force Base, Alaska. It is an active-duty unit assigned to the 354th Fighter Wing and operates the Lockheed Martin F-35A Lightning II. The squadron is tasked with the Suppression of Enemy Air Defenses. Between 2015 and 2019, the unit's assignment was that of a subordinate unit of the 495th Fighter Group based at Naval Air Station Joint Reserve Base Fort Worth in Texas, flying the General Dynamics F-16C/D Fighting Falcon.

== History ==
=== World War II ===
Activated on 15 November 1942 at Hamilton Field, California, initially equipped with P-39 Airacobras and assigned to IV Fighter Command for training. Moved to several bases in California and Nevada then to Portland Army Air Base, Oregon in June 1943 and re-equipped with new North American P-51B Mustangs. Transitioned to the Mustang throughout the summer of 1943 the deployed to the European Theater of Operations, being assigned to IX Fighter Command in England.

In late 1943, the strategic bombardment campaign over Occupied Europe and Nazi Germany being conducted by VIII Bomber Command was taking heavy losses in aircraft and flight crews as the VIII Fighter Command's Lockheed P-38 Lightnings and Republic P-47 Thunderbolts lacked the range to escort the heavy B-17 Flying Fortress and B-24 Liberator bombers deep into Germany to attack industrial and military targets. The P-51 had the range to perform the escort duties and the unit's operational control was transferred to Headquarters, Eighth Air Force to perform escort missions. From its base at RAF Boxted, the unit flew long-range strategic escort missions with VIII Bomber Command groups, escorting the heavy bombers to targets such as Frankfurt, Leipzig, Augsburg, and Schweinfurt, engaging Luftwaffe day interceptors frequently, with the P-51s outperforming the German Bf 109 and Fw 190 interceptors, causing heavy losses to the Luftwaffe. Remained under operational control of Eighth Air Force until April 1944, when sufficient numbers of P-51D Mustangs and arrived from the United States and were assigned to VIII Fighter Command units for escort duty.

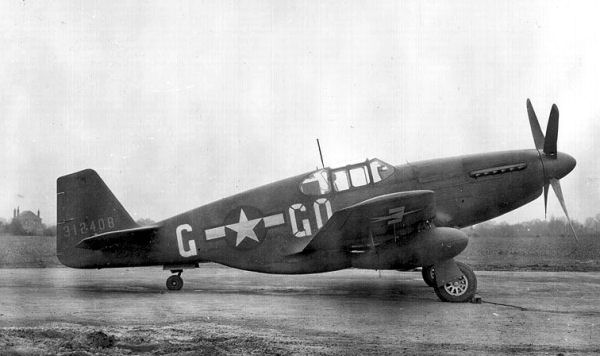
North American P-51B-1-NA Mustang Serial 43-12408 of the 355th Fighter Squadron, photo probably taken at RAF Boxted, England, early 1944.

Was relieved from escort duty and reassigned to RAF Lashenden on the southern coast of England. Mission was redefined to provide tactical air support for the forthcoming invasion of France, to support the Third, and later Ninth United States Armies. Flew fighter sweeps over Normandy and along the English Channel coast of France and the Low Countries, April–June 1944, then engaged in heavy tactical bombing of enemy military targets as well as roads, railroads and bridges in the Normandy area to support ground forces in the immediate aftermath of D-Day.

Moved to Advanced Landing Grounds in France beginning at the end of June 1944, moving eastwards to combat airfields and liberated French airports supporting Allied Ground forces as the advanced across Northern France. Later, in 1944, the squadron became involved in dive-bombing and strafing missions, striking railroad yards, bridges, troop concentrations, and airfields. As winter set in the squadron temporarily re-equipped with the P-47 Thunderbolt. Participated in attacks on German forces in Belgium in the aftermath of the Battle of the Bulge, then moved eastward as part of the Western Allied invasion of Germany. The squadron flew its last mission of the war on 7 May 1945 from the captured Luftwaffe airfield at Ansbach (R-45).

Remained in Occupied Germany as part of the United States Air Forces in Europe XII Tactical Air Command occupying force after the German Capitulation, being stationed at AAF Station Herzogenaurach. Was inactivated on 31 March 1946.

The last remaining soldier of this squadron, Robert E. Kuhnert, died October 4, 2022, at the age of 102.

=== Cold War ===
Reactivated by Tactical Air Command, United States Air Force on 19 November 1956, being assigned to the reactivated 354th Fighter-Day Group at the new Myrtle Beach Air Force Base, South Carolina. Equipped with North American F-100 Super Sabre fighters, the squadron participated in exercises, operations, tests, and firepower demonstrations conducted by the Tactical Air Command within the US and abroad. The unit frequently deployed to Aviano Air Base, Italy and Wheelus Air Base, Libya. Was deployed to Europe during the 1958 Lebanon crisis and was moved to McCoy Air Force Base, Florida in 1962 during the Cuban Missile Crisis.

=== Vietnam War ===
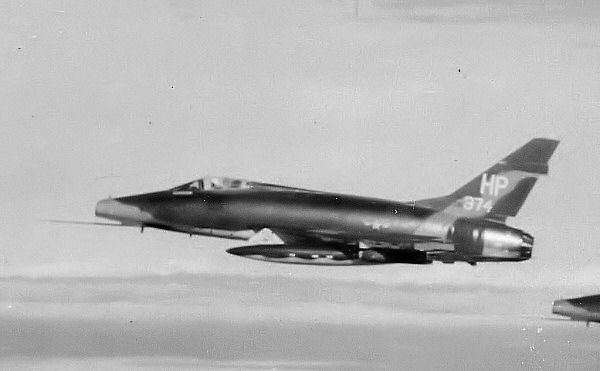
355th TFS North American F-100D-80-NH Super Sabre 56-3374 on a mission into North Vietnam from Phu Cat AB, South Vietnam

On 3 February 1968, the 355th Tactical Fighter Squadron was deployed to support the 37th Tactical Fighter Wing at Phù Cát Air Base, South Vietnam for five months' Temporary Duty (TDY).

At the end of the TDY on 5 July, the 355 TFS was permanently assigned to the 37th, with activated New Jersey and District of Columbia Air National Guard personnel from the 113th Tactical Fighter Wing at Myrtle Beach replacing them and manning the unit.

On 15 May 1969, with the reassignment of the 612th and 174th Tactical Fighter Squadrons, it was decided to convert the 37th to a McDonnell F-4 Phantom II wing. The F-100 equipped 355th, along with the 416th Tactical Fighter Squadron were reassigned to the 31st Tactical Fighter Wing at Tuy Hoa Air Base, replacing the Air National Guard 136th and 188th Tactical Fighter Squadrons which were returning to New York and New Mexico, respectively.

At Tuy Hoa, the tail code of the 355th F-100s was changed to "SP", and deployed Air National Guard personnel from New York and New Mexico and regular Air Force personnel manned the 355th until its inactivation on 30 September 1970.

During its time in Vietnam, the 355th flew more than 17,000 combat sorties flying close air support, interdiction, search and rescue, and helicopter support missions. The squadron was awarded the Presidential Unit Citation. the Air Force Outstanding Unit Award, and the Republic of Vietnam Gallantry Cross with Palm for its service.

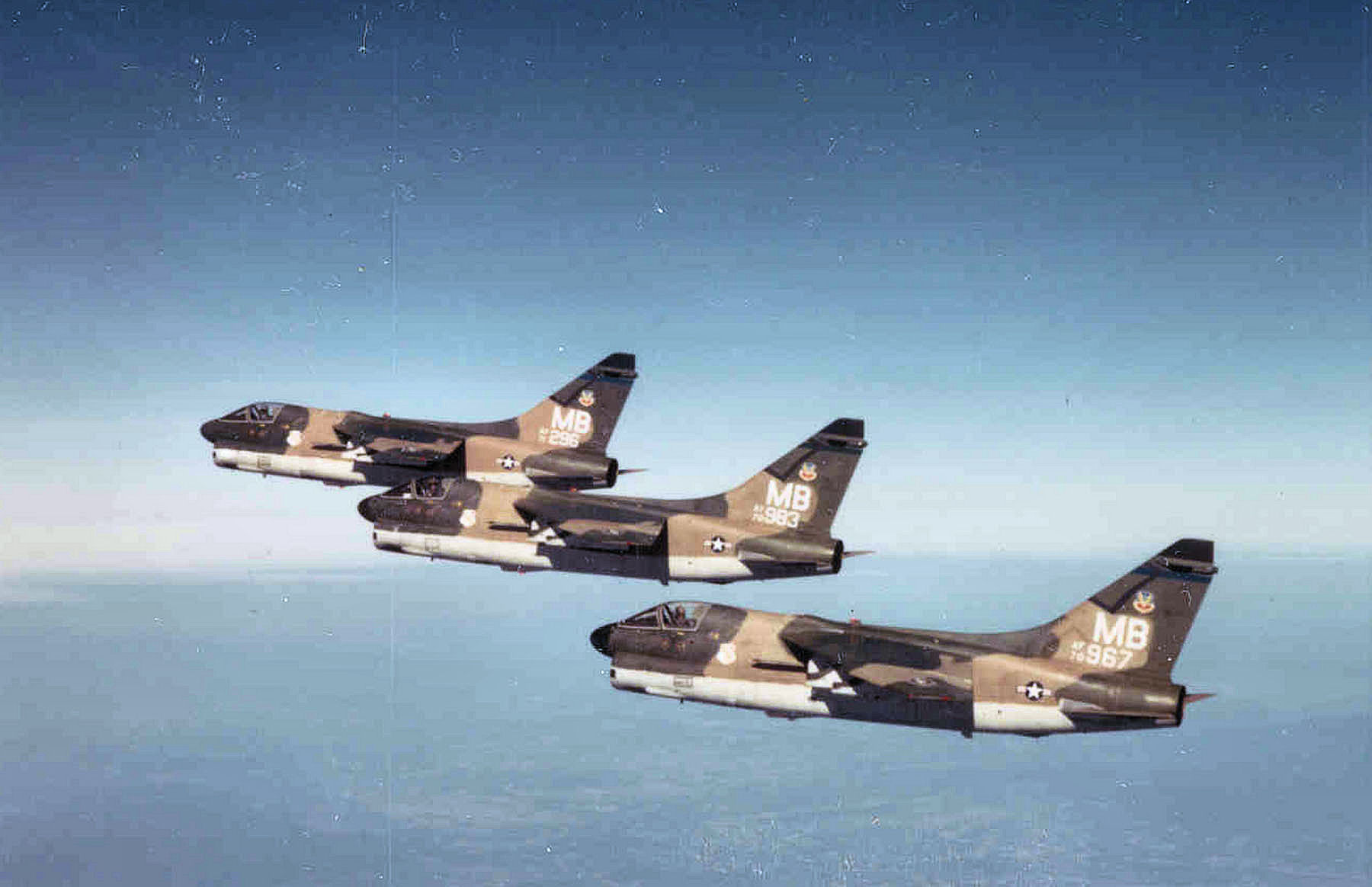
In-flight formation of 3 LTV A-7Ds (S/N 70-0967, 70-0983 and 71-0296) of the 355th Tactical Fighter Squadron, 354th Tactical Fighter Wing (Forward) deployed to Korat Royal Thai Air Force Base, Thailand in December 1972.

On 1 November 1970, the 355 TFS was reactivated at Myrtle Beach Air Force Base, South Carolina as part of the 354th Tactical Fighter Wing. Upon its return, the unit transitioned to the new LTV A-7D Corsair II aircraft before redeploying to Southeast Asia in the fall of 1972 as the first A-7 unit to fight there. In 10 weeks of combat before the end of that conflict, the squadron participated in the Operation Linebacker II campaign, generated more than 4,000 sorties, and was credited with 22 rescues of downed airmen. The unit returned to Myrtle Beach in April 1974.

=== A-10 Thunderbolt II (1978–2007) ===
==== Post-Vietnam era ====
In February 1978, the 355th TFS transitioned to the new Fairchild Republic A-10 Thunderbolt II, a close air support aircraft, becoming the second operational squadron in the nation's first A-10 wing.

Duty called again in August 1990 when the unit deployed to King Fahd International Airport, Saudi Arabia in support of Operations Desert Shield and Desert Storm. There, the squadron's pilots inflicted heavy damage to Iraqi armor and artillery emplacements, helped cut off enemy supply lines, and conducted search and rescue missions. The squadron contributed greatly to the 4,200 artillery, tank and other vehicle kills credited to A-10s during the war.

==== Modern era ====
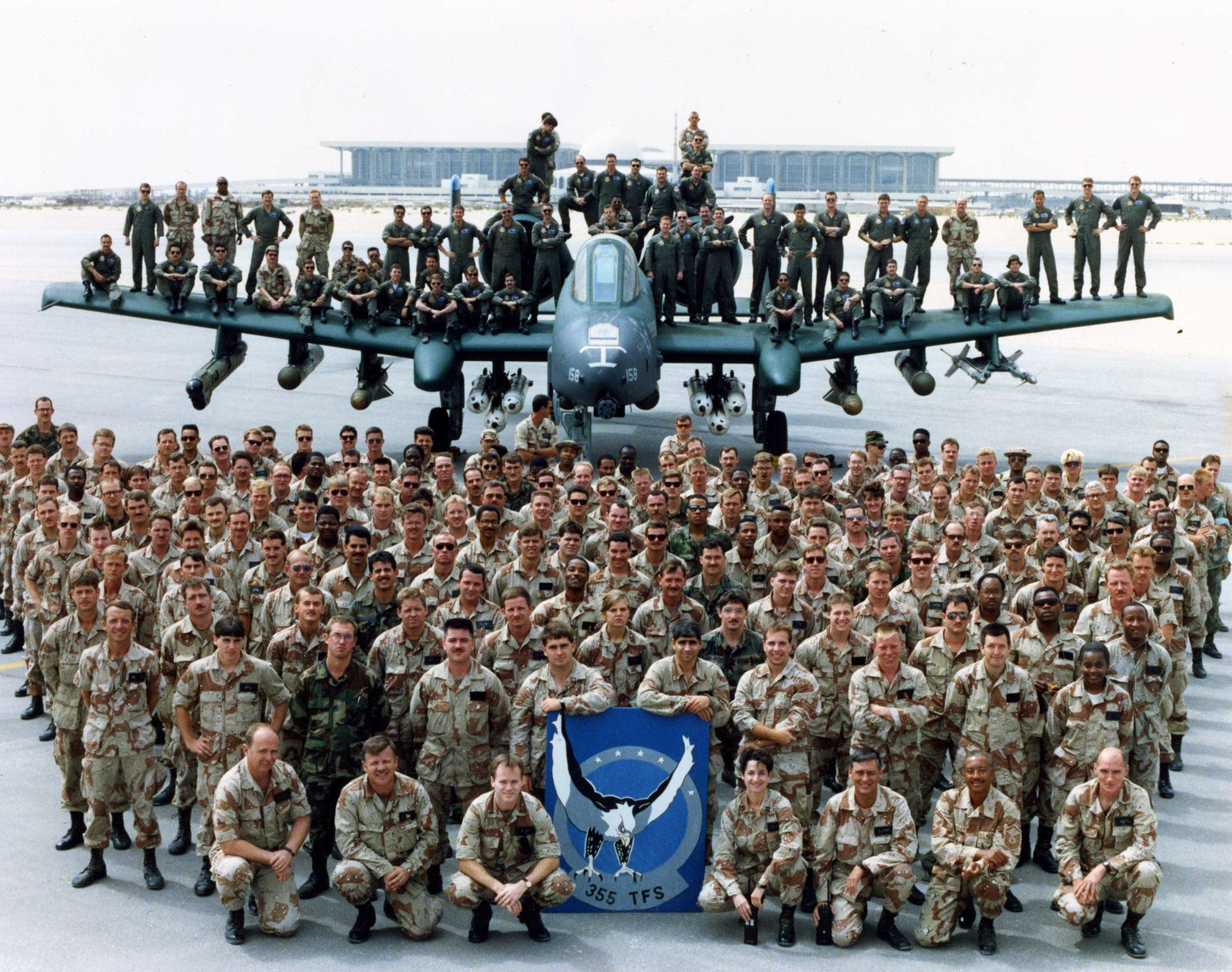
355th Tactical Fighter Squadron Personnel – March 1991 – King Fahd International Airport after victory in Operation Desert Storm

Inactivated at Myrtle Beach on 31 March 1992, the 355 FS was reactivated on 20 August 1993, replacing the inactivating 11th Tactical Air Support Squadron at Eleison AFB, Alaska. The unit's primary missions included air strike control, close air support, interdiction, joint air attack team, escort, and combat search and rescue.

With a dual role A/OA-10 Warthog squadron commitment and night vision goggles, the squadron had the ability to deploy forward air controllers with attack aircraft for a complete day and night employment capability.

355th FS deployed to Aviano Air Base, Italy from January 1996 to March 1997, supporting Operation Joint Guard. No ordnance was employed, but pilots flew sorties and sat alert with combat loaded aircraft.

In October 1998, the 355 FS deployed to support Operation Southern Watch. Only two months later, the Warthogs saw their second tour of combat duty over Iraq while participating in the 16–19 December 1998, Operation Desert Fox strike missions. In 2.5 months, the 355 FS flew 597 combat and combat support sorties leading up to, then conducting, National Command Authority directed strikes on Iraqi military facilities and suspected weapons of mass destruction storage areas. They achieved 100 percent target hit rate.

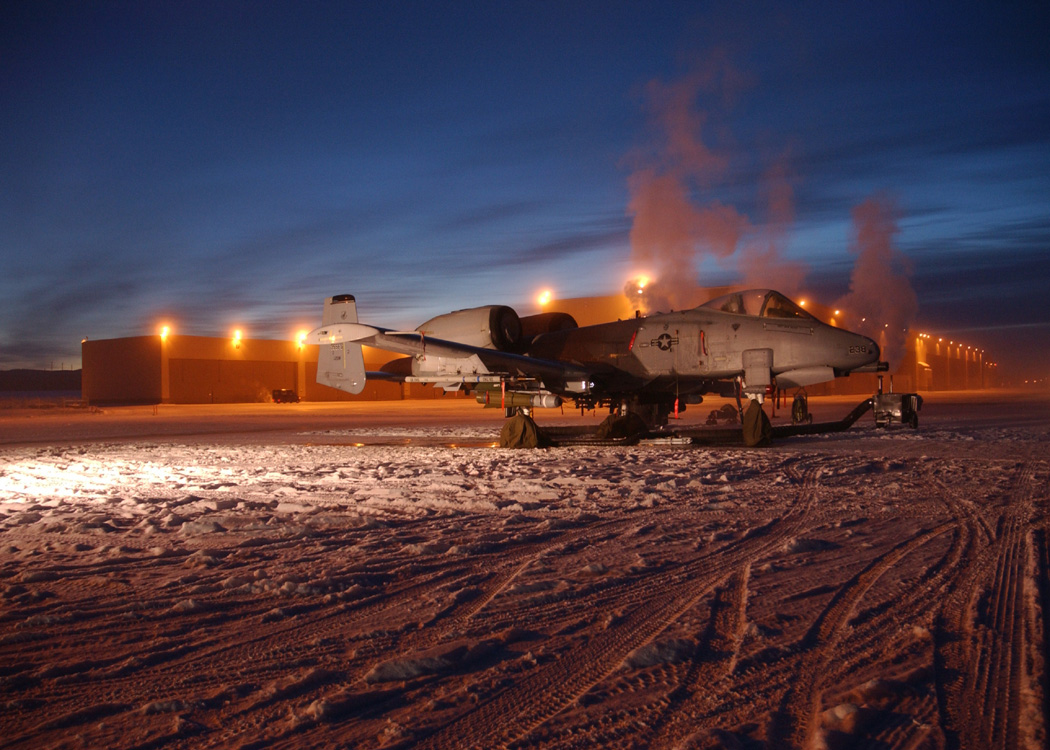
An A-10 Thunderbolt II of the 355th Fighter Squadron sits on the tarmac at Eielson before a mission, 2004

The 355FS was the first air combat unit to deploy to the Middle East after the Towers Fell on 11SEP2001. The unit deployed to Ahmad al-Jaber Air Base, Kuwait, in support of Operation Southern Watch, Operation Northern Watch, and even Operation Enduring Freedom from November 2001 – March 2002 with Air Expeditionary Force 10 (AEF). The aircraft flew from Eielson AFB, Alaska all the way to Ahmed Al Jaber Air Base, Kuwait making brief (crew rest only stops) at Westover, Massachusetts (not Barnes), then Lajes in the Aczores, then Trapani Sicily, then Kuwait, arriving 05DEC2001. The A-10s utilized Air to Air Refueling (AAR or Aerial Refueling) in between ground stops, thus proving once again that the USAF Tanker force is one of the reasons that the US military truly has global reach (YCKAWTG). In Kuwait, the 355th FS joined the 338th AEG (Air Expeditionary Group) The Panthers/Red Tag/Tail Bastards.

The 355th FS also provided Battalion Air Liaison Officers (BALOs) to 6 dedicated Army Combat Units as a regular part of their combat mission. BALOs are considered Forward Air Controllers or FACs (specifically GFAC or Ground FAC) whether or not they also hold an Airborne FAC qualification. Typically these BALOs also hold JTAC-qualified certifications. These BALOs continuously support Army and other combat units (air, ground, sea, and space) during exercises while currently serving as combat-ready and combat-qualified A-10 pilots. They provided advice on the use of all aerial assets (fixed-wing, rotary, drone, etc.) as well as all munitions that fly through their battlespace (this includes Rockets, Artillery, mortars, etc.). Although not often called to actual battle, the 355th did provide Battalion Air Liaison Officers (BALOs) to multiple Army Units, to include one Airborne Unit the 1-501st Airborne. In particular, the Chief BALO/A-10 FAC, Captain A. Rodell Severson (while serving as an operational A-10 pilot with the 355th), actually deployed to combat with the 1-501, becoming a Tactical Air Control Party Commander (TACP), commanding two consecutive special operations teams from 25 October 2003 through 4 May 2004 for Joint Task Force 1-501 earning a Bronze Star through approximately 155 ground combat missions: 17 sustained rocket attacks, 7 troops in contact, and 5 direct fire fights: 501st Infantry Regiment (United States).

The 355 FS also exercised at Hurlburt Field, Florida, to train with Special Forces units, October 2003.

In Spring 2004 the unit deployed to Bagram Air Base, Afghanistan in support of Operation Enduring Freedom. The unit redeployed there again early 2006. During both deployments the unit was responsible to provide close air support to Army ground forces and convoys in Afghanistan.

==== Base realignment and closure ====
On 13 May 2005, The Department of Defense proposed a major realignment of the base as part of the Base Realignment and Closure program. The A-10 aircraft were to be distributed to the 917th Wing at Barksdale Air Force Base, Louisiana (three aircraft); to a new active-duty unit at Moody Air Force Base, Georgia (12 aircraft); and to backup inventory (three aircraft).

Lt. Col. Quentin "Q-Tip" Rideout, 355th Fighter Squadron Commander, flew the last operational A-10 sortie at Eielson AFB on 31 July 2007. The last three A-10A aircraft departed Eielson AFB on 15 August 2007. Lt. Col. Kevin "Crotch" Blanchard flew 81-0944, Capt. Sean "Shark" Hall flew 79-0172, and Capt. Dale "Porkchop" Stark flew 80-0259.

=== Fort Worth (2015–2019) ===
In 2010, Detachment 457, a geographically separated unit of the 20th Operations Group at Shaw Air Force Base, South Carolina, stood up at Naval Air Station Joint Reserve Base Fort Worth, Texas. The unit oversaw the integration of over 130 active-duty General Dynamics F-16 Fighting Falcon pilots and maintenance personnel into the Air Force Reserve Command's 301st Fighter Wing under the Total Force Initiative. On 8 March 2013, the 495th Fighter Group was stood up at Shaw as a dedicated unit overseeing ten active associate fighter units, including Detachment 457. On 5 October 2015, Detachment 457 discontinued and was replaced by the 355th Fighter Squadron, which reactivated the same day. It was under the administrative command of the 495th Fighter Group and flying and maintaining General Dynamics F-16C/D Fighting Falcons assigned to the 301st's 457th Fighter Squadron at Fort Worth.

=== Current Operations (2020–present) ===
On 18 December 2020, the 355 Fighter Squadron was activated and assigned to the 354 Operations Group. The 355th FS became the second Lockheed Martin F-35A Lightning II equipped unit in Alaska after the 356th Fighter Squadron.

== Lineage ==
- Constituted as the 355th Fighter Squadron on 12 November 1942

Activated on 15 November 1942
Redesignated 355th Fighter Squadron, Single Engine on 21 August 1944
Inactivated on 31 March 1946

- Redesignated 355th Fighter-Day Squadron on 28 September 1956

Activated on 19 November 1956
Redesignated 355th Tactical Fighter Squadron on 1 July 1958
Inactivated on 30 September 1970

- Activated on 1 November 1970

Redesignated 355th Fighter Squadron on 1 November 1991
Inactivated on 31 March 1992

- Activated on 20 August 1993

Inactivated on 15 August 2007

- Activated on 5 October 2015

Inactivated on 25 October 2019
Activated on 18 December 2020

=== Assignments ===
- 354th Fighter Group, 15 November 1942 – 31 March 1946
- 354th Fighter-Day Group, 19 November 1956
- 354th Fighter-Day Wing (later 354th Tactical Fighter Wing), 25 September 1957

Attached to: Seventeenth Air Force, 15 July – 26 October 1958; 19 May – 17 September 1959; 10 September 1960 – 16 January 1961; 7 July – 14 October 1962; 3 July – 17 September 1963; 8 June – 28 August 1964; 2 July – 25 September 1965; and 4 December 1965 – 23 April 1966, 50th Tactical Fighter Wing, 5 September – 19 November 1961, 2d Air Division Provisional, 21 October – 1 December 1962, Alaskan Air Command, 6–20 February 1963, 37th Tactical Fighter Wing, 3 February – 22 April 1968

- 113th Tactical Fighter Wing, 22 April 1968 (remained attached to 37th Tactical Fighter Wing until 4 July 1968
- 37th Tactical Fighter Wing, 5 July 1968
- 31st Tactical Fighter Wing, 19 May 1969 – 30 September 1970
- 354th Tactical Fighter Wing (later 354th Fighter Wing), 1 November 1970 – 31 March 1992 (attached to 354th Combat Support Group, 15 – 16 August 1990, 354th Tactical Fighter Wing Provisional, 20 December 1990 – 2 August 1991
- 354th Operations Group, 20 August 1993 – 15 August 2007
- 495th Fighter Group, 5 October 2015 – 25 October 2019
- 354th Operations Group, 18 December 2020 – present

=== Stations ===
- Hamilton Field, California, 15 November 1942
- Tonopah Army Air Field, Nevada, 20 January 1943
- Hayward Army Air Field, California, 4 May 1943
- Portland Army Air Base, Oregon, 3 June – 6 October 1943
- RAF Greenham Common, England, 4 November 1943
- RAF Boxted, England, 13 November 1943
- RAF Lashenden, England, c. 14 April 1944
- Cricqueville-en-Bessin (A-2), France, c. 18 June 1944
- Gaël (A-31), France, 14 August 1944
- Orconte (A-66), France, 21 September 1944

Operated from Saint-Dizier/Robinson (A-64), France, c. 18 November – 1 December 1944

- Rosieres en Haye (A-98), France, 1 December 1944
- Mainz-Finthen Airdrome (Y-64), Ober-Olm, Germany, c. 4 April 1945
- Ansbach Airdrome (R-82), Germany, 1 May 1945
- Herzogenaurach Airdrome (R-29), Germany, c. 15 May 1945 – 15 February 1946
- Bolling Field, District of Columbia, 15 February – 31 March 1946
- Myrtle Beach Air Force Base, South Carolina, 19 November 1956 – 5 July 1968

Deployed to Adana Air Base, Turkey, 15 July – 26 October 1958; Aviano Air Base, Italy, 19 May – 17 September 1959, 10 September 1960 – 16 January 1961, 7 July – 14 October 1962, 15 June – 28 August 1964, 2 July – 25 September 1965; Hahn Air Base, West Germany, 5 September – 19 November 1961; McCoy Air Force Base, Florida, 21 October – 1 December 1962; Elmendorf Air Force Base, Alaska, 6 – 20 February 1963; Incirlik Air Base, Turkey, 3 July – 17 September 1963, 4 December 1965 – 23 April 1966; Orland, Norway, 8 – 15 June 1964; Phu Cat Air Base, South Vietnam, after 3 February 1968

- Phu Cat Air Base, South Vietnam, 5 July 1968
- Tuy Hoa Air Base, South Vietnam, 15 May 1969 – 30 September 1970
- Myrtle Beach Air Force Base, South Carolina, 1 November 1970 – 31 March 1992

Deployed to Korat Royal Thai Air Force Base, Thailand, 10 October 1972 – 16 March 1973, 15 October 1973 – 26 April 1974; King Fahd International Airport, Saudi Arabia, 15 August 1990 – 2 August 1991

- Eielson Air Force Base, Alaska, 20 August 1993 – 15 August 2007
- Fort Worth Naval Air Station Joint Reserve Base, Texas. 5 October 2015 – 25 October 2019
- Eielson Air Force Base, Alaska, 18 Dec 2020 – present

=== Major aircraft assigned ===
- Bell P-39 Airacobra, 1943
- North American P-51 Mustang, 1943–1944; 1945–1946
- Republic P-47 Thunderbolt, 1944–1945
- North American F-100 Super Sabre, 1956–1970
- LTV A-7 Corsair II, 1970–1977
- Fairchild Republic A-10 Thunderbolt II, 1978–1992; 1993–2007
- General Dynamics F-16C/D Fighting Falcon, 2015–2019
- Lockheed Martin F-35A Lightning II, 2020–present

=== Campaign streamers ===
- World War II: 7 - Air Offensive, Europe; Normandy; Northern France; Rhineland; Ardennes-Alsace; Central Europe; Air Combat, EAME Theater.
- Vietnam War: 10 - Vietnam Air Offensive, Phase II; Vietnam Air Offensive, Phase III; Vietnam Air Ground; Vietnam Air Offensive, Phase IV; TET 69/Counteroffensive; Vietnam Summer-Fall, 1969; Vietnam Winter-Spring, 1970; Sanctuary Counteroffensive; Southwest Monsoon; Vietnam Ceasefire.
- Southwest Asia: 2 - Defense of Saudi Arabia; Liberation and Defense of Kuwait.

=== Decorations ===
- Distinguished Unit Citations: ETO, [Dec] 1943 – 15 May 1944; France, 25 August 1944
- Presidential Unit Citations: Southeast Asia, 1 July – 31 December 1968; Southeast Asia, 10 October 1972 – 30 April 1973.
- Air Force Outstanding Unit Awards: 1 October 1962 – 31 December 1963; 3 February – 30 June 1968; 1 November 1970 – 31 May 1972; 1 May 1974 – 30 April 1976; 1 January 1978 – 31 March 1979; 1 July 1985 – 30 June 1987; 1 May 1990 – 15 March 1992; 1 June 2017 - 31 May 2019.
- French Croix De Guerre with Palm: 1 December 1943 – 31 December 1944.
- Republic of Vietnam Gallantry Cross with Palm: 22 January 1968 – 31 August 1970.
