= William D. Curry =

United States Air Force general

William Donald Curry Jr.
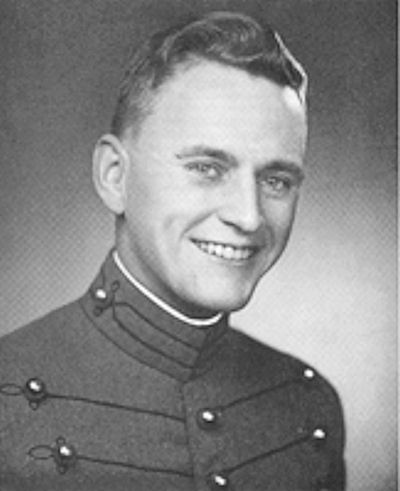
- William Donald Curry Jr. West Point graduation photo, 1950
- Born: May 15, 1926; Minneapolis, Minnesota
- Died: April 16, 2013 (aged 87); Williamsburg, Virginia
- Burial place: Arlington National Cemetery, Virginia
- Military career
- Allegiance: United States of America
- Branch: United States Army Air Forces; United States Air Force
- Service years: 1943–1980
- Rank: Brigadier general
- Conflicts: World War II; Korean War; Vietnam War

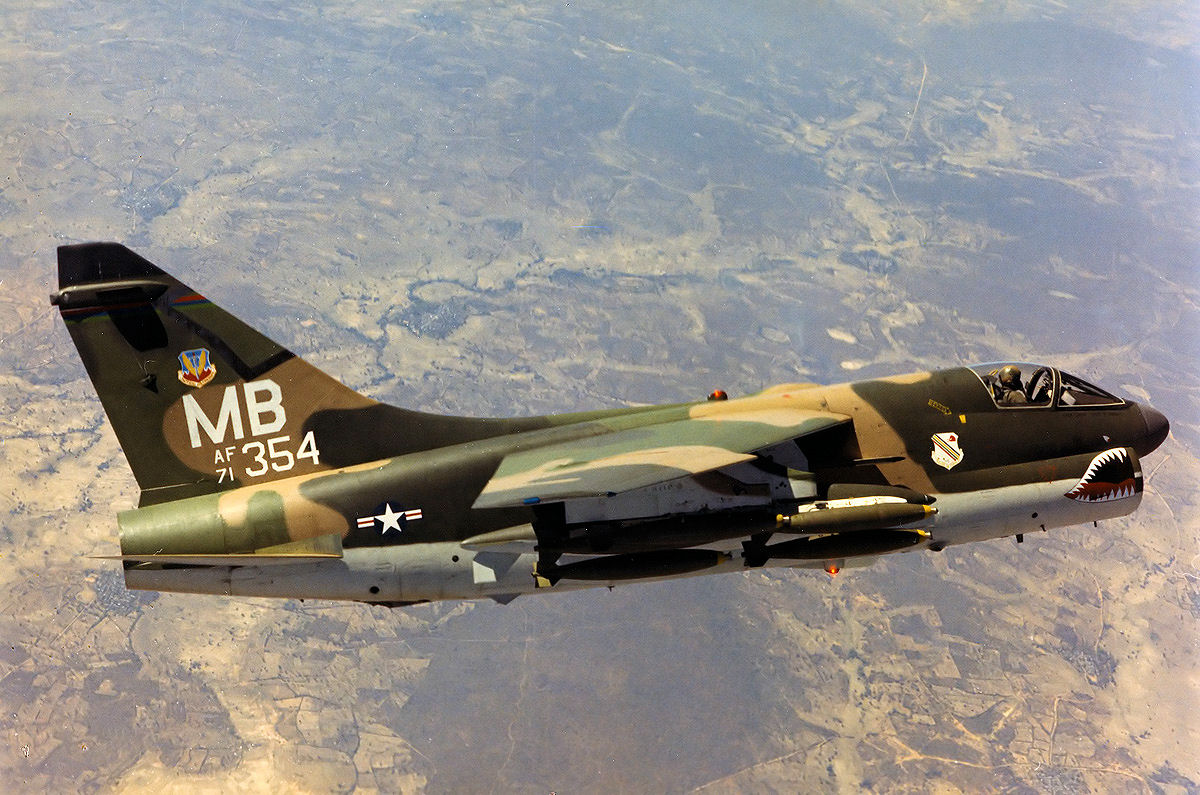
Ling-Temco-Vought A-7D Corsair II 71-0354 On August 15, 1973, Col. William D. Curry Jr, Commander 354th TFW (Deployed), took off from Korat RTAFB, Thailand, and dropped the last bomb by the United States Air Force of the Vietnam War, attacking Khmer Rouge forces just to the north of Phnom Penh, Cambodia.

Brigadier General William D. Curry Jr (May 15, 1926 – April 16, 2013) was a retired United States Air Force officer. He was a command pilot with over 6,500 flying hours, serving in World War II, the Korean and Vietnam Wars.

== Biography ==
General Curry was born in Minneapolis in 1926. He entered the United States Army Air Forces from Marshalltown, Iowa, during World War II and served as a B-24 Liberator crew chief until entering the United States Military Academy. Upon graduation in 1950, he was commissioned a second lieutenant.

He began his career during the Korean War flying in a combat tour in F-51 Mustangs. The years following Korea were spent as a fighter pilot and in various operational assignments while serving with Tactical Air Command units until 1958. From 1959 to 1966, he served in the Strategic Air Command as a B-47 Stratojet aircraft commander and operations staff officer.

In 1966 General Curry returned to the fighter business and joined the 366th Tactical Fighter Wing at Da Nang Air Base, Republic of Vietnam, in 1968. While there he flew a combat tour as an F-4 Phantom II squadron commander. A second Southeast Asia combat tour was completed in 1973. During this tour he served as commander of the 354th Tactical Fighter Wing, which was deployed to Korat Royal Thai Air Force Base, Thailand, flying the A-7D Corsair II.

Other assignments include a tour as deputy chief, Joint Chiefs of Staff Matters, Global Plains and Policy Division, Directorate of Plains, Headquarters U.S. Air Force; vice commander and commander of the 354th Tactical Fighter Wing at Myrtle Beach Air Force Base, South Carolina.; assistant deputy and deputy chief of staff, logistics, Headquarters Tactical Air Command; commander of the 355th Tactical Fighter Wing; and commander, Tactical Training Davis-Monthan, Davis-Monthan Air Force Base, Arizona.

He was promoted to the grade of brigadier general July 1, 1975, with date of rank June 27, 1975. His last command was as commander of the Defense General Supply Center, Defense Logistics Agency, in Richmond, Virginia. in July 1978. He retired from active duty on 1 August 1980.

Curry lived in the Richmond, Virginia, area after his retirement. He continued to serve his community after his retirement as a charter member and president of the Brandermill Rotary Club in Richmond, Virginia, and a board member of the Richmond United Way. He valued his associations working in leadership roles with the Rotary Club, the Air Force Association, and the West Point Society. He was the chairman for the Disaster Services to the Red Cross of Virginia and was a consultant to the American Red Cross in Washington, D.C., providing disaster services and logistical support. He was able to use his skills and knowledge as well as his gifts and talents to support families devastated by natural disasters.

General Curry died in April 2013 in Williamsburg, Virginia, and is buried at Arlington National Cemetery, Virginia.

== Education and decorations ==
Curry was awarded a Master of Science degree in international relations from The George Washington University and was a graduate of Squadron Officer School, Armed Forces Staff College and the Air War College. He was a command pilot with 6,500 flying hours.

His military decorations and awards include the Legion of Merit with oak leaf cluster, Distinguished Flying Cross with two oak leaf clusters, Air Force Commendation Medal with two oak leaf clusters and the Army Commendation Medal.
