= Orconte =

- Commune
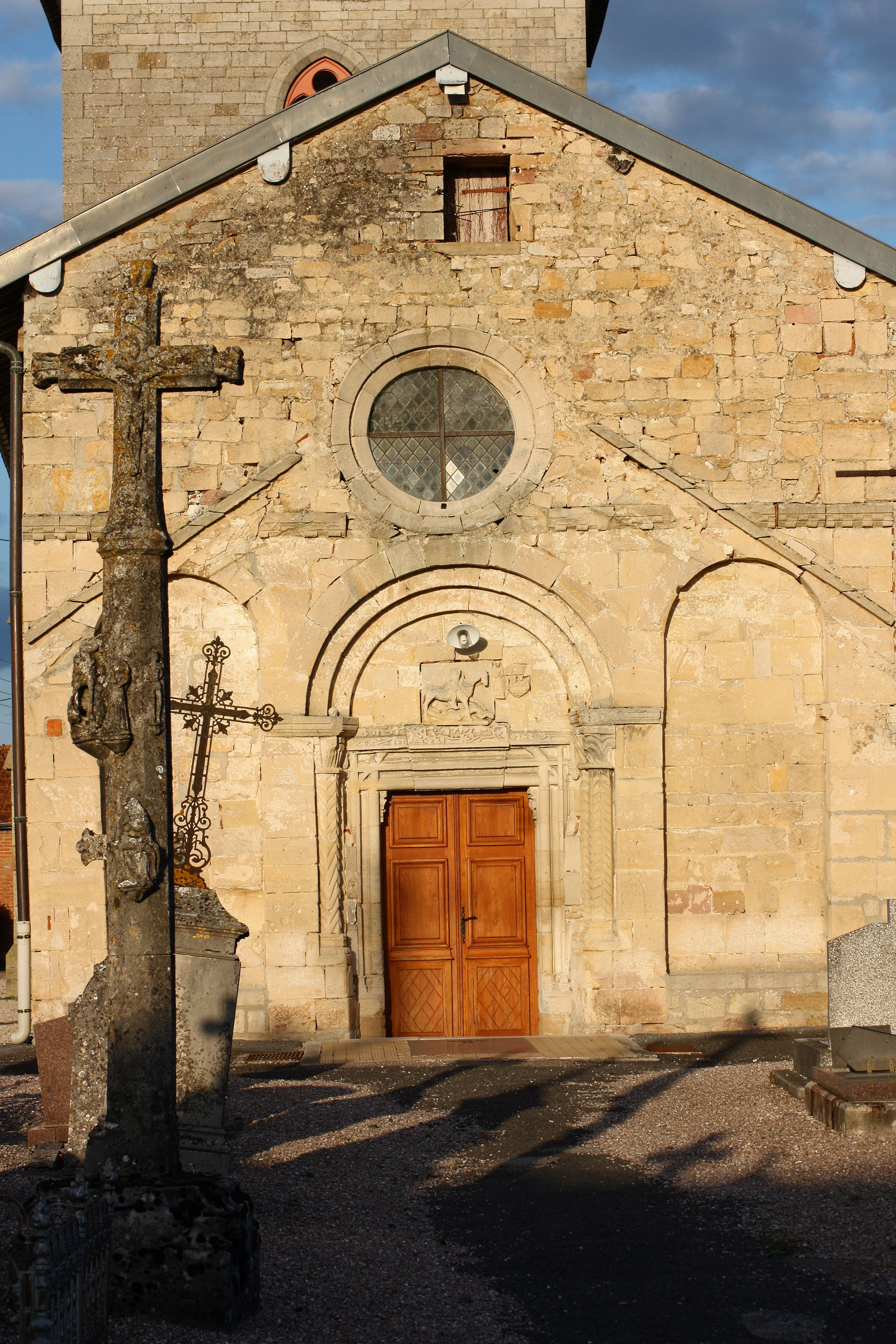
- The church in Orconte

- Coat of arms
- Location of Orconte
- Location within France Location within Grand Est
- Coordinates: 48°40′14″N 4°44′10″E
- Country: France
- Region: Grand Est
- Department: Marne
- Arrondissement: Vitry-le-François
- Canton: Sermaize-les-Bains

Government
  - Mayor (2020–2026): Mario Hernandez
- Area^{1}: 13.65 km^{2} (5.27 sq mi)
- Elevation: 119 m (390 ft)
- Population (2023): 365
  - Density: 26.7/km^{2} (69.3/sq mi)
- Time zone: UTC+01:00 (CET)
  - Summer (DST): UTC+02:00 (CEST)
- INSEE/Postal code: 51417 /51300
- ^{1} French Land Register data, which excludes lakes, ponds, glaciers > 1 km^{2} (0.386 sq mi or 247 acres) and river estuaries.

Orconte (French pronunciation: [ɔʁkɔ̃t]) is a commune in the Marne department in north-eastern France.

== Second World War ==
Captain Antoine de Saint-Exupéry (1900- 1944) stayed in the commune during winter 1939, with the Groupe de Grande Reconnaissance 2/33 (Reconnaissance Group II/23). He evokes this period and the farm (opposite the church) where he lived in Pilote de guerre, translated into English as Flight to Arras.

In September 1944, the United States Army Air Forces established a temporary airfield Advanced Landing Ground, known as "A-66" near Orconte. The Ninth Air Force 354th Fighter Group flew P-51 Mustangs and P-47 Thunderbolts from the airfield from 15 September until 11 December 1944. The unit moved east with the advancing Allied armies and the airfield was dismantled with the land being returned to agricultural use.

== See also ==
- Communes of the Marne department
