= 352d Tactical Fighter Squadron =

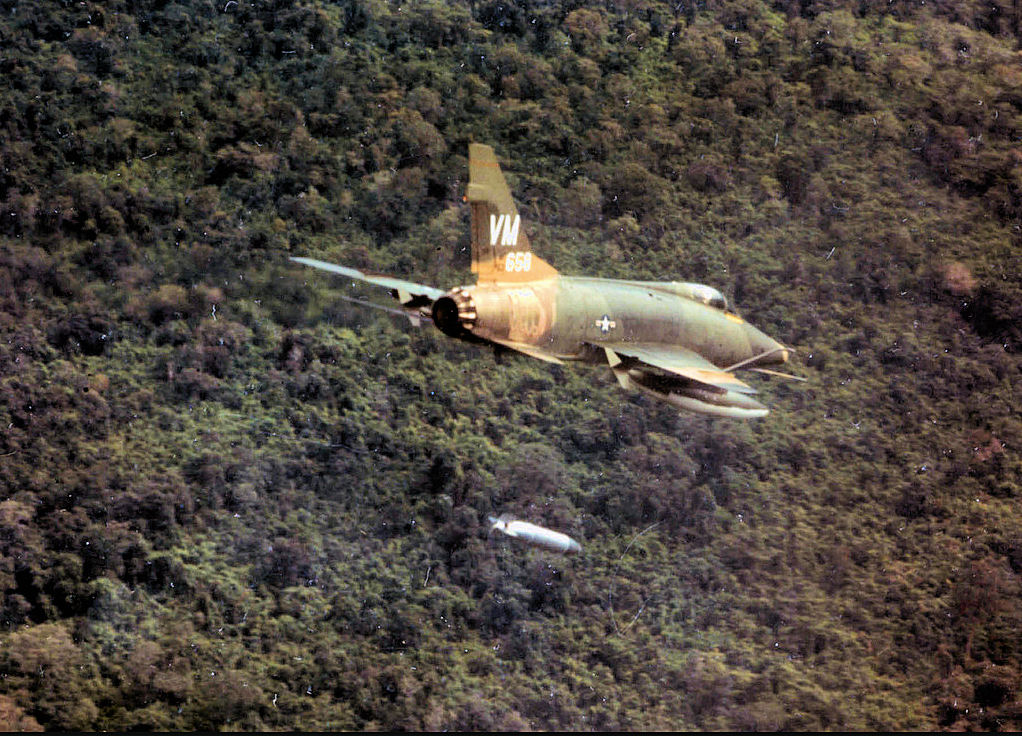
- F-100D of the 352d Tactical Fighter Squadron dropping napalm near Bien Hoa (Note: Airplane is North American F-100D-25-NA Super Sabre, serial 55-3658, tail code VM. Baugher, Joe (6 May 2023). "1955 USAF Serial Numbers". Joe Baugher.)
- Active: 1943–1944; 1944–1945; 1957–1971
- Country: United States
- Branch: United States Air Force
- Role: Tactical fighter
- Motto: Dum Spiro Pugno (Latin for 'While I Breathe I Fight')
- Engagements: American Theater of World War II; European theater of World War II; Vietnam Service

Insignia
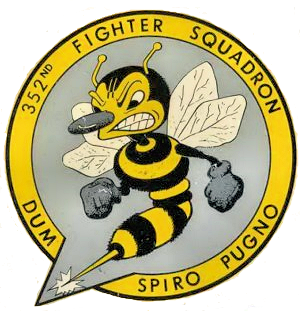
- 352d Tactical Fighter Squadron Emblem

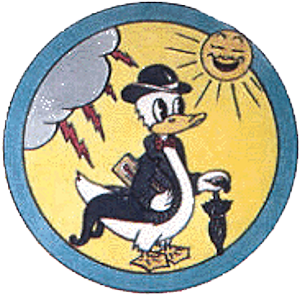
- 652d Bombardment Squadron emblem (Note: Approved 21 February 1945. Description: On a yellow disc, border light turquoise blue, a caricatured white duck, facing toward sinister, with orange bill and feet, wearing a dark gray, swallowtail coat and derby, holding a folded umbrella of the last [color mentioned] in the tip of the left wing, and a thermometer proper, under the right wing, standing beneath a large threatening gray cloud in dexter chief, with four, small, jagged red lightning flashes emanating therefrom, and the laughing face of the sun over the border in sinister chief, with black ray lines issuing therefrom.)
- Viet Nam tail code: VM
- World War II fuselage code: YN

The 352d Tactical Fighter Squadron is an inactive United States Air Force fighter squadron. Its last assignment was with the 35th Tactical Fighter Wing at Phan Rang Air Base, South Vietnam, where it was inactivated on 31 July 1971.

The first predecessor of the squadron was activated in 1943 as the 372d Fighter Squadron, which served as a Lockheed P-38 Lightning Replacement Training Unit until it was disbanded in 1944.

The second predecessor of the squadron was the 652d Bombardment Squadron, which conducted weather reconnaissance in the European Theater of Operations.

The 352d Fighter-Day Squadron was formed during the Cold War, the squadron was attached to NATO, and stood on alert during the Cuban Missile Crisis. Deployed to South Vietnam during the Vietnam War, the squadron fought with distinction. The squadron was inactivated there in 1971.

== History ==
=== World War II ===
==== Fighter replacement training ====
The 372d Fighter Squadron was activated in early 1943 at March Field, California as one of the three original squadrons of the 360th Fighter Group, but moved on paper to Glendale Airport the same day. It operated as a Lockheed P-38 Lightning Replacement Training Unit (RTU). RTUs were oversized units which trained aircrews prior to their deployment to combat theaters. In January 1944 the squadron moved away from its parent group and established a separate RTU at Santa Maria Army Air Field, California.

However, the Army Air Forces found that standard military units, based on relatively inflexible tables of organization were proving less well adapted to the training mission. Accordingly, a more functional system was adopted in which each base was organized into a separate numbered unit. This resulted in the 372d, along with other units at Santa Maria, being disbanded in the spring of 1944 and being replaced by the 440th AAF Base Unit (Fighter Replacement Training Unit, Twin Engine).

==== Weather reconnaissance in the European Theater ====
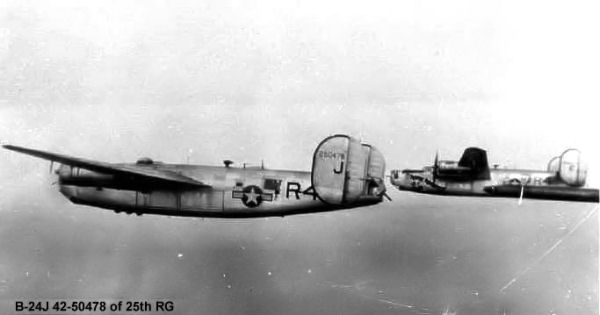
B-24 identified as assigned to 25th Bombardment Group B-24 (Note: Aircraft is Consolidated B-24J-401-CF Liberator, serial 42-50478. Although identified on the photo as a 25th Group plane, according to Baugher, this plane was assigned to the 567th Bombardment Squadron. Baugher, Joe (6 May 2023). "1942 USAF Serial Numbers". Joe Baugher. Moreover, both Freeman and Watson identify the R4 fuselage code as assigned to the Radio Countermeasures Squadron (later 36th Bombardment Squadron). Freeman, p. 292, Watson, p. 121.)

The second predecessor of the squadron was the 652d Bombardment Squadron, which conducted weather reconnaissance in the European Theater of Operations.

The 652d Bombardment Squadron replaced what began as a provisional weather reconnaissance detachment that was formed on 31 August 1943 with Boeing B-17 Flying Fortresses, then transferred to RAF St Eval on 8 September 1943 to conduct meteorological fights over the Atlantic Ocean. On 25 October 1943 this provisional unit was formalized as Detachment A of the Combat Weather Detachment, 1st Combat Crew Replacement Center at RAF Bovingdon. On 23 November 1943 the detachment joined its parent at Bovingdon. On 28 March 1944 Eighth Air Force replaced the detachment with the 8th Weather Reconnaissance Squadron (Heavy) (Provisional). The squadron was one of the three squadrons of the 8th Reconnaissance Group (Provisional) (later the 802d Reconnaissance Group, Special (Provisional).

In August 1944 Eighth Air Force replaced its provisional weather reconnaissance units with permanent ones and the 652d was activated. The 652d primarily flew B-17Gs, although at first it also had B-24Ds and B-24Hs. Its missions were long-range weather flights code named "Epicure" In which the aircraft flew a box pattern 700 miles out over the Atlantic. Weather readings were taken every 50 miles at heights varying from 50 to 30,000 feet. The average flight time for these flights was over 12 hours. For thirteen months the squadron maintained an average of 1.5 aircraft in the air over the Atlantic at all hours of the day and night, and for the last nine months of the war the average exceeded two aircraft in the air for all hours of the day and night.

When its parent 25th Bombardment Group returned to the United States after the German surrender in May 1945, the 652d was assigned to 1st Air Division and continued to fly weather missions. The squadron returned to the United States in December and was inactivated when it reached the port of embarkation.

=== Cold War ===
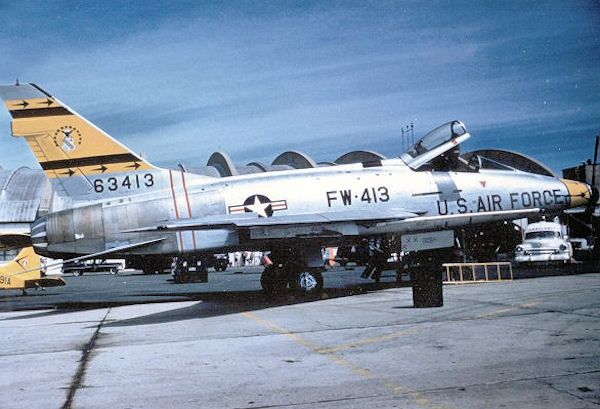
352d F-100 Super Sabre (Note: Aircraft is North American F-100D-85-NH Super Sabre, serial 56-3413. This plane was transferred to the Aerospace Maintenance and Regeneration Center on 23 September 1979. It was later converted to a QF-100D target drone and was shot down on 8 November 1990. Baugher, Joe (11 May 2023). "1956 USAF Serial Numbers". Joe Baugher.. Photo taken about 1960.)

On 25 September 1957 Tactical Air Command (TAC) activated the 352d Fighter-Day Squadron and assigned it to the 354th Fighter-Day Wing at Myrtle Beach Air Force Base, South Carolina. The squadron was equipped with the North American F-100 Super Sabre.

The 354th Wing was committed to NATO support, and the squadron frequently deployed to Europe. It deployed to Adana Air Base, Turkey in July 1958 in response to the Crisis in Lebanon, to support the pro-western government of Lebanon, which believed itself threatened by internal dissension supported by the United Arab Republic. The squadron returned in October.

After the Lebanon Crisis, TAC began to rotate combat squadrons to Incirlik Air Base, Turkey and Aviano Air Base, Italy in support of NATO alert commitments and Air Force weapons training at the Maniago Range. The 352d, along with the 354th Wing's other squadrons, periodically supported these rotations.

During the Berlin Crisis precipitated by the erection of the Berlin Wall by the German Democratic Republic in August 1961 and the subsequent face-off of American and Soviet tanks in Berlin, the squadron deployed to Hahn Air Base, German Federal Republic, in November 1961. Once tensions eased, the squadron returned in March 1962.

The squadron deployed a third time in response to a Cold War crisis, but this time the deployment was closer to home. During the Cuban Missile Crisis of 1962, the 352d deployed to McCoy Air Force Base, Florida in October where it became part of the forces attached to the Air Division, Provisional, 2d. After the crisis ended, the 352d returned home in December.

=== Vietnam War ===
As the intensity of the Viet Nam War increased in 1966, The United States Air Force began to replace its rotational units on temporary duty in Southeast Asia with permanent ones. As a result, the 352d Tactical Fighter Squadron moved to Phan Rang Air Base, South Vietnam on 15 August 1966, where it was assigned to the 366th Tactical Fighter Wing. Two months later Pacific Air Forces moved the 366th Wing to Da Nang Air Base where it became an F-4 Phantom II wing, while the 35th Tactical Fighter Wing took its place at Phan Rang, with F-100 Super Sabre squadrons in a swap of wing headquarters designations.

Squadron missions included close air support of ground forces, air interdiction, visual and armed air reconnaissance, escort, and rapid reaction alert.

During the Cambodian Campaign of 1970, the 352d struck enemy bases and supply caches in the Parrot's Beak area just inside the Cambodian border during April and May. The 352d also provided close air support and interdiction in support of South Vietnamese operations in Laos and Cambodia during January through June 1971.

In April 1971 the 352d began phasing down for inactivation and flew its last combat mission on 26 June 1971. The squadron was inactivated, along with the 35th Wing on 31 July 1971 as part of the American drawdown in Vietnam. The squadron was awarded a Presidential Unit Citation and four Air Force Outstanding Unit Awards w/Combat "V" Device for its combat performance.

=== Consolidation ===
In September 1985, the three squadrons were consolidated under the 352d Tactical Fighter Squadron designation, but have remained inactive.

== Lineage ==
372d Fighter Squadron

- Constituted on 20 December 1942 as the 372d Fighter Squadron, Two Engine

Activated on 15 January 1943
Disbanded on 31 March 1944

- Reconstituted on 19 September 1985 and consolidated with the 352d Tactical Fighter Squadron and the 652d Bombardment Squadron as the 352d Tactical Fighter Squadron

652d Bombardment Squadron

- Constituted on 17 July 1944 as the 652d Bombardment Squadron, Heavy (Weather Reconnaissance)
- Activated on 9 August 1944
- Inactivated on 19 December 1945
- Consolidated on 19 September 1985 with the 372d Fighter Squadron and the 352d Tactical Fighter Squadron as the 352d Tactical Fighter Squadron

352d Tactical Fighter Squadron

- Constituted on 20 August 1957 as the 352d Fighter-Day Squadron
- Activated on 25 September 1957
- Redesignated 352d Tactical Fighter Squadron 1 July 1958
- Inactivated on 31 July 1971
- Consolidated on 19 September 1985 with the 372d Fighter Squadron and the 652d Bombardment Squadron (remained inactive)

=== Assignments ===
- 360th Fighter Group: 15 January 1943 – 31 March 1944
- 25th Bombardment Group: 9 August 1944
- 1st Air Division: 13 June 1945
- 3d Air Division: 25 August 1945
- VIII Fighter Command: 1 November 1945 – 19 December 1945
- 354th Fighter-Day Wing (later 354th Tactical Fighter Wing), 25 September 1957 (detached 16 July 1958 – 26 October 1958; 14 April 1959 – 23 April 1959; 12 January 1960 – 14 May 1960; 30 November 1960 – 5 December 1960; 15 February 1961 – 4 March 1961;14 November 1961 – 11 March 1962; 21 October 1962 – 1 December 1962; 14 January 1963 – 21 April 1963; 7 May 1963 – 18 May 1963; 30 June 1963 – 18 September 1963; 10 December 1963 – 12 March 1964; 20 November 1964 – 18 March 1965; 14 July 1965 – 27 August 1965)
- 366th Tactical Fighter Wing, 15 August 1966
- 35th Tactical Fighter Wing, 10 October 1966 – 31 July 1971

=== Stations ===
- March Field, California, 15 January 1943
- Glendale Airport, California, 15 January 1943
- Muroc Army Air Field, California, 14 April 1943
- Salinas Army Air Base, California, 21 September 1943
- Santa Maria Army Air Field, California, 7 January 1944 – 31 March 1944
- RAF Watton (Station 376), England, 9 August 1944
- RAF Alconbury (Station 102), England, 13 July 1945
- RAF Raydon, England (Station 157), 25 October 1945 – December 1945
- Camp Kilmer, New Jersey 17 December 1945 – 19 December 1945
- Myrtle Beach Air Force Base, South Carolina, 25 September 1957 (deployed to Adana Air Base (later Incirlik Air Base), Turkey, 16 July 1958 – 26 October 1958; Aviano Air Base, Italy and Incirlik Air Base, Turkey between 1959 and 1965; Hahn Air Base, West Germany, 14 November 1961 – 11 March 1962; McCoy Air Force Base, Florida, 21 October – 1 December 1962; Palam Airport, India, 7–18 May 1963)
- Phan Rang Air Base, Republic of Viet Nam, 9 August 1966 – 31 July 1971

=== Aircraft ===
- Lockheed P-38 Lightning, 1943–1944
- Consolidated B-24D Liberator, 1944
- Consolidated B-24H Liberator, 1944
- Boeing B-17F Flying Fortress, 1944–1945
- Boeing B-17G Flying Fortress, 1944–1945
- North American F-100D Super Sabre, 1957–1971
- North American F-100F Super Sabre, 1957–1971

=== Awards and campaigns ===
Award streamer	Award	Dates	Notes
	Presidential Unit Citation	10 October 1966 – 10 April 1967	Viet Nam, 352d Tactical Fighter Squadron
	Air Force Outstanding Unit Award w/Combat "V" Device	3 September 1967 – 2 May 1968	352d Tactical Fighter Squadron
	Air Force Outstanding Unit Award w/Combat "V" Device	1 October 1968 – 13 April 1969	352d Tactical Fighter Squadron
	Air Force Outstanding Unit Award w/Combat "V" Device	14 April 1969 – 13 April 1970	352d Tactical Fighter Squadron
	Air Force Outstanding Unit Award w/Combat "V" Device	1 December 1970 – 25 June 1971	352d Tactical Fighter Squadron
	Air Force Outstanding Unit Award	1 October 1962 – 31 December 1963	352d Tactical Fighter Squadron
	Vietnamese Gallantry Cross with Palm	3 June 1966 – 30 March 1971	352d Tactical Fighter Squadron
	Vietnamese Gallantry Cross with Palm	24 February 1971 – 30 March 1971	352d Tactical Fighter Squadron

Service and Campaign Streamers	Campaign	Dates	Notes
	American Theater of World War II	15 January 1943 – 31 March 1944	372d Fighter Squadron
	Northern France	9 August 1944 – 14 September 1944	652d Bombardment Squadron
	Air Combat, EAME Theater	9 August 1944 – 11 May 1945	652d Bombardment Squadron
	Vietnam Air	3 June 1966 – 28 June 1966	352d Tactical Fighter Squadron
	Vietnam Air Offensive	29 June 1966 – 8 March 1967	352d Tactical Fighter Squadron (Note: There is a gap between 1966 and 1968 in awards registered in Volumes 1 and 2 of AFP 900-2. The squadron participated in combat during these campaigns)
	Vietnam Air Offensive, Phase II	29 June 1966 – 8 March 1967	352d Tactical Fighter Squadron
	Vietnam Air Offensive, Phase III	29 June 1966 – 8 March 1967	352d Tactical Fighter Squadron
	Vietnam Air Offensive, Phase IV	1 November 1968 – 22 February 1969	352d Tactical Fighter Squadron
	Tet 1969/Counteroffensive	23 February 1969 – 8 June 1969	352d Tactical Fighter Squadron
	Vietnam Summer-Fall 1969	9 June 1969 – 31 October 1969	352d Tactical Fighter Squadron
	Vietnam Winter-Spring 1970	3 November 1969 – 30 April 1970	352d Tactical Fighter Squadron
	Sanctuary Counteroffensive	1 May 1970 – 30 June 1970	352d Tactical Fighter Squadron
	Southwest Monsoon	1 July 1970 – 30 November 1970	352d Tactical Fighter Squadron
	Commando Hunt V	1 December 1970 – 14 May 1971	352d Tactical Fighter Squadron
	Commando Hunt VI	15 May 1971 – 31 July 1971	352d Tactical Fighter Squadron

== Bibliography ==
- Anderson, Capt. Barry (1985). Army Air Forces Stations: A Guide to the Stations Where U.S. Army Air Forces Personnel Served in the United Kingdom During World War II (PDF). Maxwell AFB, AL: Research Division, USAF Historical Research Center.
- Craven, Wesley F.; Cate, James L., eds. (1955). The Army Air Forces in World War II (PDF). Vol. VI, Men & Planes. Chicago, Illinois: University of Chicago Press. LCCN 48003657. OCLC 704158. Archived from the original (PDF) on 20 December 2016.
- Freeman, Roger A. (1970). The Mighty Eighth: Units, Men and Machines (A History of the US 8th Army Air Force). London, England, UK: Macdonald and Company. ISBN 978-0-87938-638-2.
- Maurer, Maurer, ed. (1983) [1961]. Air Force Combat Units of World War II (PDF) (reprint ed.). Washington, DC: Office of Air Force History. ISBN 0-912799-02-1. LCCN 61060979. Archived from the original (PDF) on 20 December 2016.
- Maurer, Maurer, ed. (1982) [1969]. Combat Squadrons of the Air Force, World War II (PDF) (reprint ed.). Washington, DC: Office of Air Force History. ISBN 0-405-12194-6. LCCN 70605402. OCLC 72556. Archived from the original (PDF) on 20 December 2016.
- Mueller, Robert (1989). Air Force Bases, Vol. I, Active Air Force Bases Within the United States of America on 17 September 1982 (PDF). Washington, DC: Office of Air Force History. ISBN 0-912799-53-6.
- Ravenstein, Charles A. (1984). Air Force Combat Wings, Lineage & Honors Histories 1947–1977. Washington, DC: Office of Air Force History. ISBN 0-912799-12-9.
- Robertson, Bruce, ed. (1961). United States Army and Air Force Fighters 1916-1961. Hertfordshire, England: Harleyford Publishers, Lts. OCLC 6398505.
- Watkins, Robert (2008). Battle Colors: Insignia and Markings of the Eighth Air Force in World War II. Vol. II (VIII) Fighter Command. Atglen, PA: Shiffer Publishing Ltd. ISBN 978-0-7643-2535-9.
- AF Pamphlet 900-2, Unit Decorations, Awards and Campaign Participation Credits Department of the Air Force, Washington, DC, 15 June 1971
- AF Pamphlet 900-2, Unit Decorations, Awards and Campaign Participation Credits, Vol II Department of the Air Force, Washington, DC, 30 September 1976
