= 354th Fighter Wing =

US Air Force unit

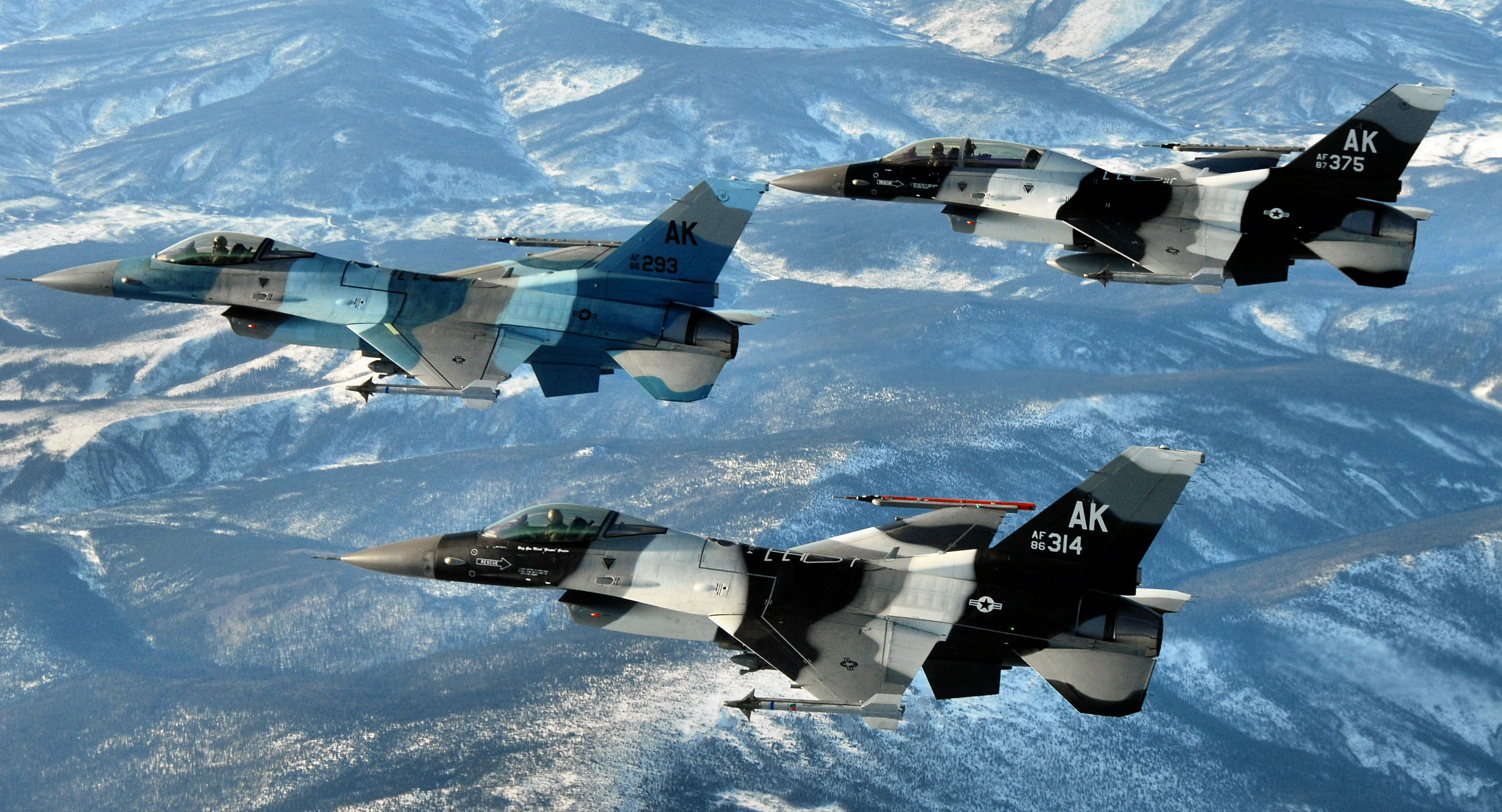
- 18th Aggressor Squadron; F-16Ds over the Alaska Range. AF Serials 86-0314 (Block 30D), 87-0375 (Block 30H) and 86-0293 (Block 30D)
- Active: 1956 – present
- Country: United States
- Branch: United States Air Force
- Type: Wing
- Role: Fighter
- Part of: Pacific Air Forces
- Garrison/HQ: Eielson Air Force Base
- Motto: Valor in Combat
- Engagements: Armed Forces Expeditionary: 1958 Lebanon crisis; Berlin Crisis of 1961; Cuban Missile Crisis; Dominican crisis; Vietnam Cease-Fire 1973–1974; Vietnam War: Vietnam Cease-Fire 1972–1973; Operation Desert Storm: Defense of Saudi Arabia; Liberation and Defense of Kuwait

- Decorations: Presidential Unit Citation; Southeast Asia, 10 Oct 1972-30 Apr 1973 Air Force Outstanding Unit Award (9x) Republic of Vietnam Gallantry Cross with Palm

Commanders
- Current commander: Colonel Matthew Johnston
- Notable commanders: Ronald Keys; William D. Curry; Francis S. "Gabby" Gabreski; Joseph J. Kruzel

Insignia
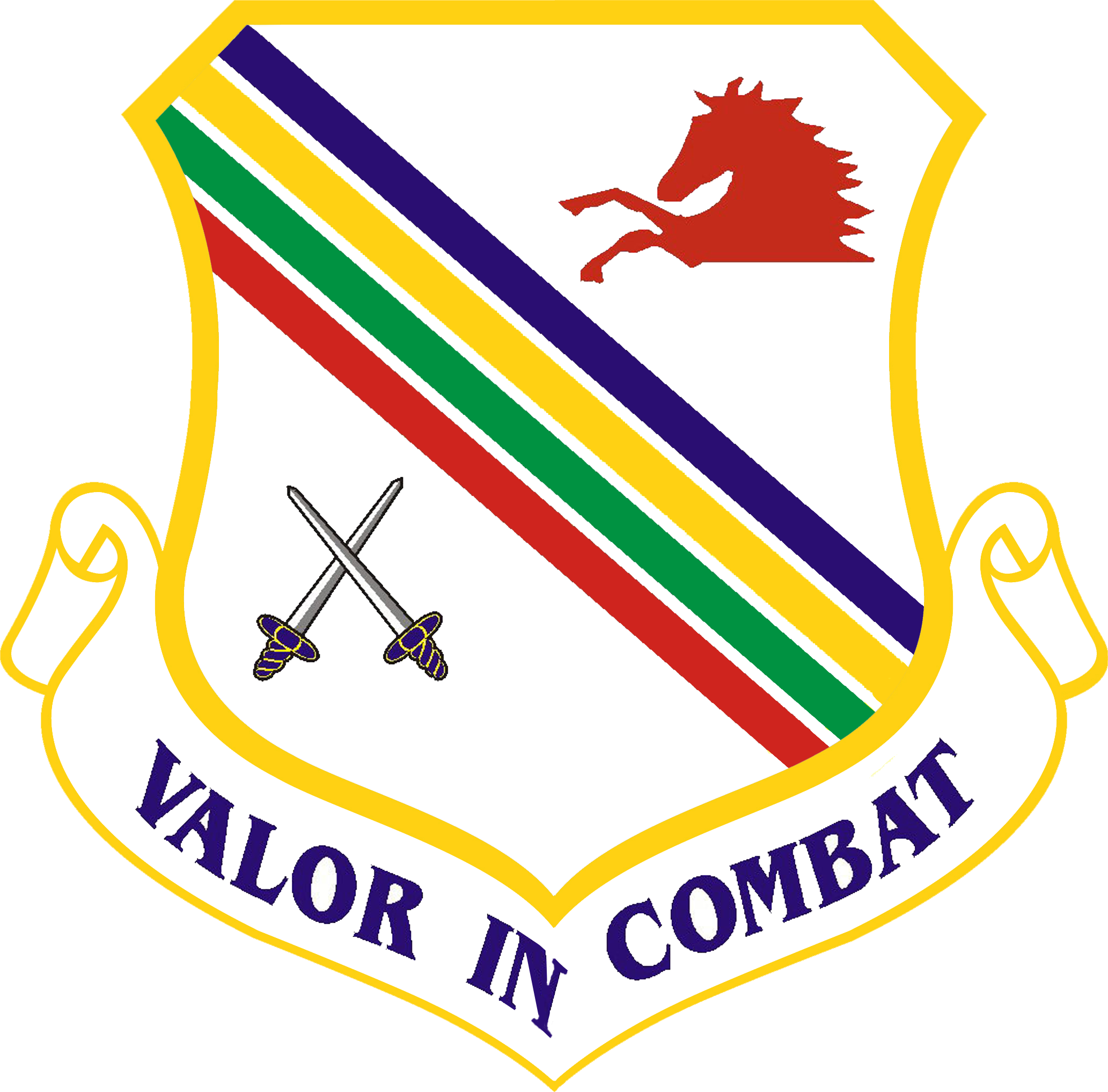
- 354th Fighter Wing Emblem

The 354th Fighter Wing is a United States Air Force wing that is part of Pacific Air Forces (PACAF). It is the host USAF wing at Eielson Air Force Base, Alaska, and is assigned to the Eleventh Air Force (11 AF).

The wing replaced the 343d Fighter Wing on 20 August 1993 as part of a service-wide effort to preserve the lineage of the Air Force's most honored wings. Prior to its inactivation, the 343d was the oldest surviving air combat unit in Alaska, with a lineage dating back to the Aleutian Campaign.

The 18th Fighter Squadron (18 FS), whose history also dated back to World War II, remained active, but the 355th Fighter Squadron (355 FS) replaced the 11 TASS.

Also changing names were the 3d Fighter Training Squadron, which became the 353d Fighter Squadron (later Combat Training Squadron). The 353 FS and 355 FS had long associations with the new host unit.

All 354th Fighter Wing Aircraft carry the tail code "AK". The 355 FS was inactivated in August 2007 as a result of Base Realignment and Closure (BRAC) 2005 action and all A-10 aircraft were reassigned to other USAF units. The 18 FS was redesignated as the 18th Aggressor Squadron (18 AGRS) and remains at Eielson, operating the F-16 in an adversary role.

Prior to its move to Alaska, the 354 FW was based for more than 35 years at the former Myrtle Beach Air Force Base, South Carolina.

== Subordinate units ==
=== 354th Operations Group ===
The 354th Operations Group directs operations, training, and standardization of F-16CG and weapon systems providing day-night combat ready forces for worldwide deployment conducting air-to-air and air-to-ground missions. Provides training and support for expeditionary combat employment of wing assigned aircraft across a full spectrum of aerospace operations. Functions as primary liaison between the Federal Aviation Administration, Army, and Air Force on all airpower applications.

- 18th Fighter Interceptor Squadron
- 353d Combat Training Squadron

The squadron's mission is RED FLAG-Alaska, 10-day air combat training exercise held up to four times a year. Each exercise is a multi-service, multi-platform coordinated, combat operations exercise and corresponds to the designed operational capability of participating units. In other words, exercises often involve several units whose military mission may differ significantly from that of other participating units.

- 354th Operations Support Squadron

Trains for and supports worldwide expeditionary combat employment for wing assigned F-16CG & F-35A. Support includes airspace and flying hour programming, life support, operations training, weapons and tactics, intelligence, operations plans, and theater battle management systems. Responsible for local air traffic control, weather service, and airfield management.

- 355th Fighter Squadron
- 356th Fighter Squadron

=== 1st Air Support Operations Group ===
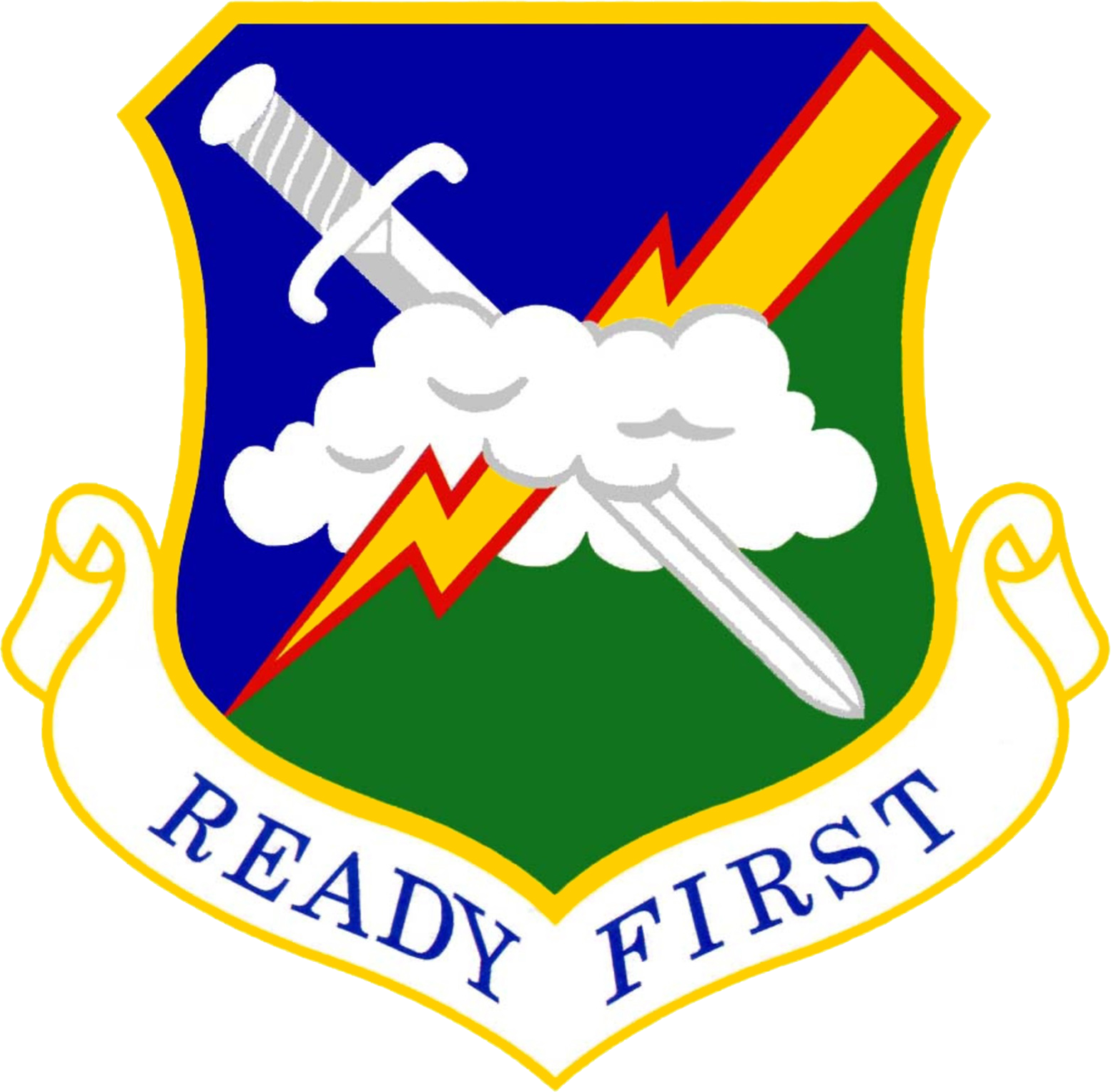
1st Air Support Operations Group

The 1st Air Support Operations Group provides combatant and operational commanders with qualified weather technicians and Joint Terminal Attack Control battlefield airmen at several geographically separated locations. The 1st ASOG itself is assigned as a Geographically Separated Unit to Fort Lewis, Joint Base Lewis-McChord, WA.

- 1st Combat Weather Squadron (Fort Lewis, WA)
- 3d Air Support Operations Squadron (Fort Wainwright, AK)
- 5th Air Support Operations Squadron (McChord Field, WA)
- 25th Air Support Operations Squadron (Wheeler Army Airfield, HI)

=== 354th Maintenance Group ===
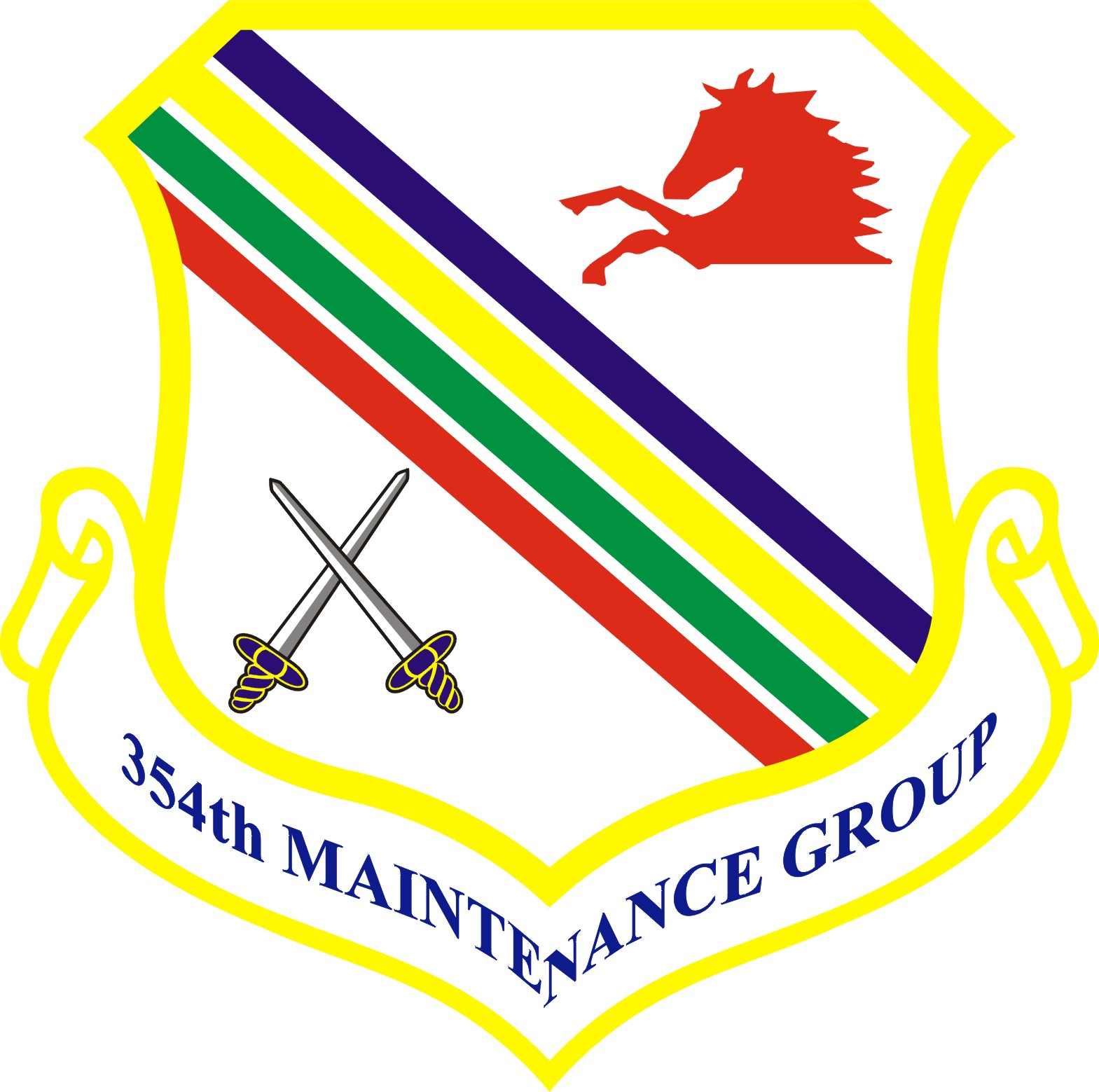

The 354th Maintenance Group provides aircraft and munitions maintenance support to the 354th Fighter Wing's F-16 Fighting Falcon aircraft as well as Red Flag - Alaska, transient and special mission aircraft operating at Eielson AFB. Aircraft maintenance in Alaskan temperatures ranging from 90 degrees in the summer to −60 degrees in the winter can be demanding, but no matter what conditions prevail in this beautiful land of extremes the men and women of the Maintenance Group "keep 'em flying". The 354th Maintenance Group staff includes command, quality assurance, information management, engineering technical services and weapons training functions. In addition, three squadrons are assigned under the group:

The 354th Aircraft Maintenance Squadron provides aircraft sortie production and weapons loading support for the Wing's aircraft. In addition to a command staff, the Aircraft Maintenance Squadron has two Aircraft Maintenance Units aligned with each of the Wing's Fighter Squadrons. The 18th Aircraft Maintenance Unit supports the 18th Fighter Squadron's F-16 aircraft. In each of these Aircraft Maintenance Units are the aircraft crew chiefs, system specialists, weapons loaders, maintenance schedulers, support personnel and production leaders who are tasked to deploy and generate aerospace power anytime and anywhere.

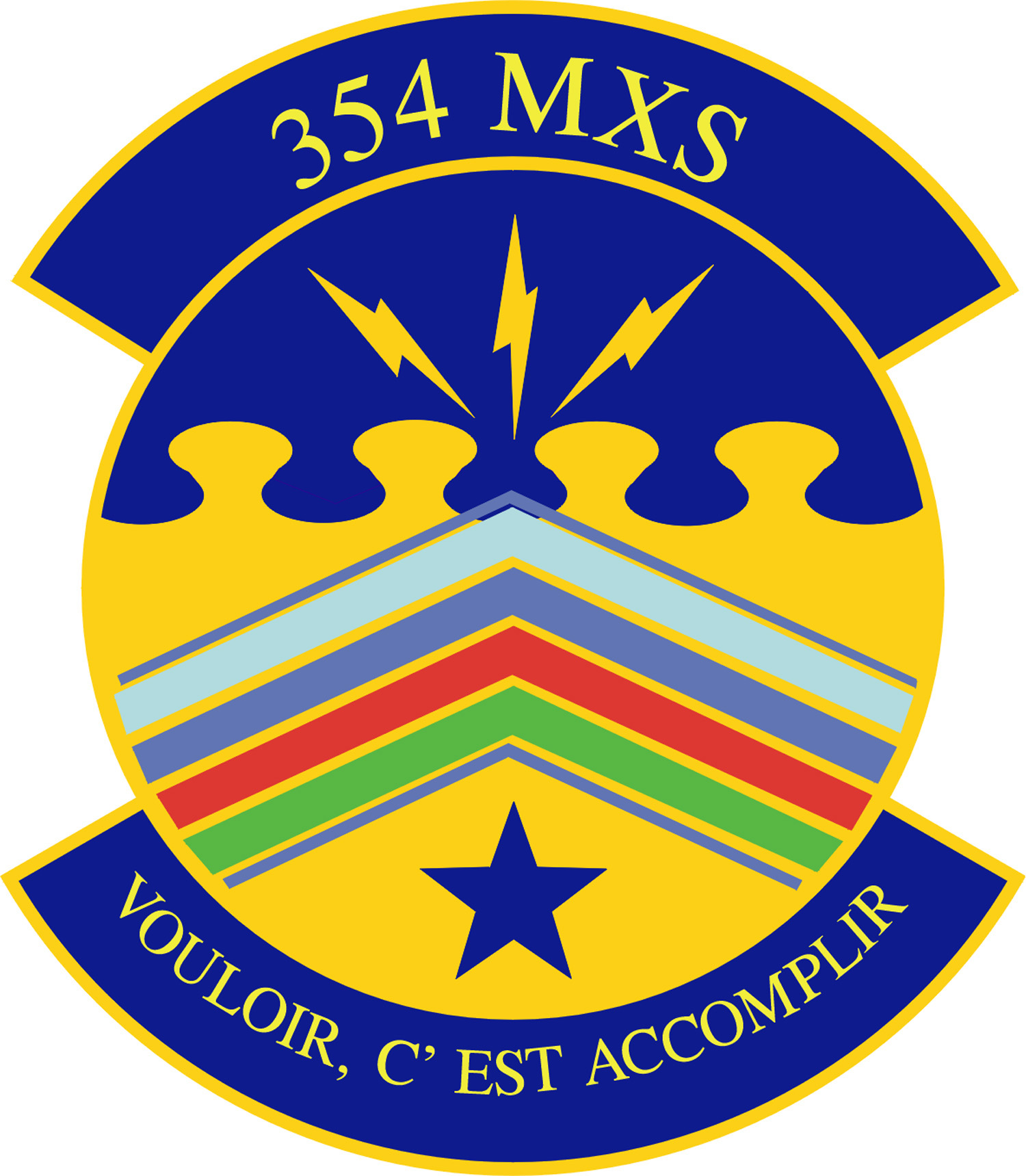

The 354th Maintenance Squadron provides heavy aircraft maintenance and munitions support for the Wing. In addition, the squadron provides aircraft maintenance and munitions support to Red Flag - Alaska (previously Cope Thunder), transient, and special mission aircraft operating at Eielson AFB. In this squadron are the command staff, avionics, propulsion, accessory maintenance, armament, fabrication, aerospace ground equipment, munitions maintenance and support personnel who are also tasked to deploy and support aerospace power anytime and anywhere.

The 354th Maintenance Operations Squadron is responsible for all of the group's maintenance training, aircraft engine data management, maintenance operations as well as maintenance plans and programs. The squadron also provides administrative support for the group staff functions and is also tasked to deploy and support aerospace power anytime and anywhere.

=== 354th Mission Support Group ===
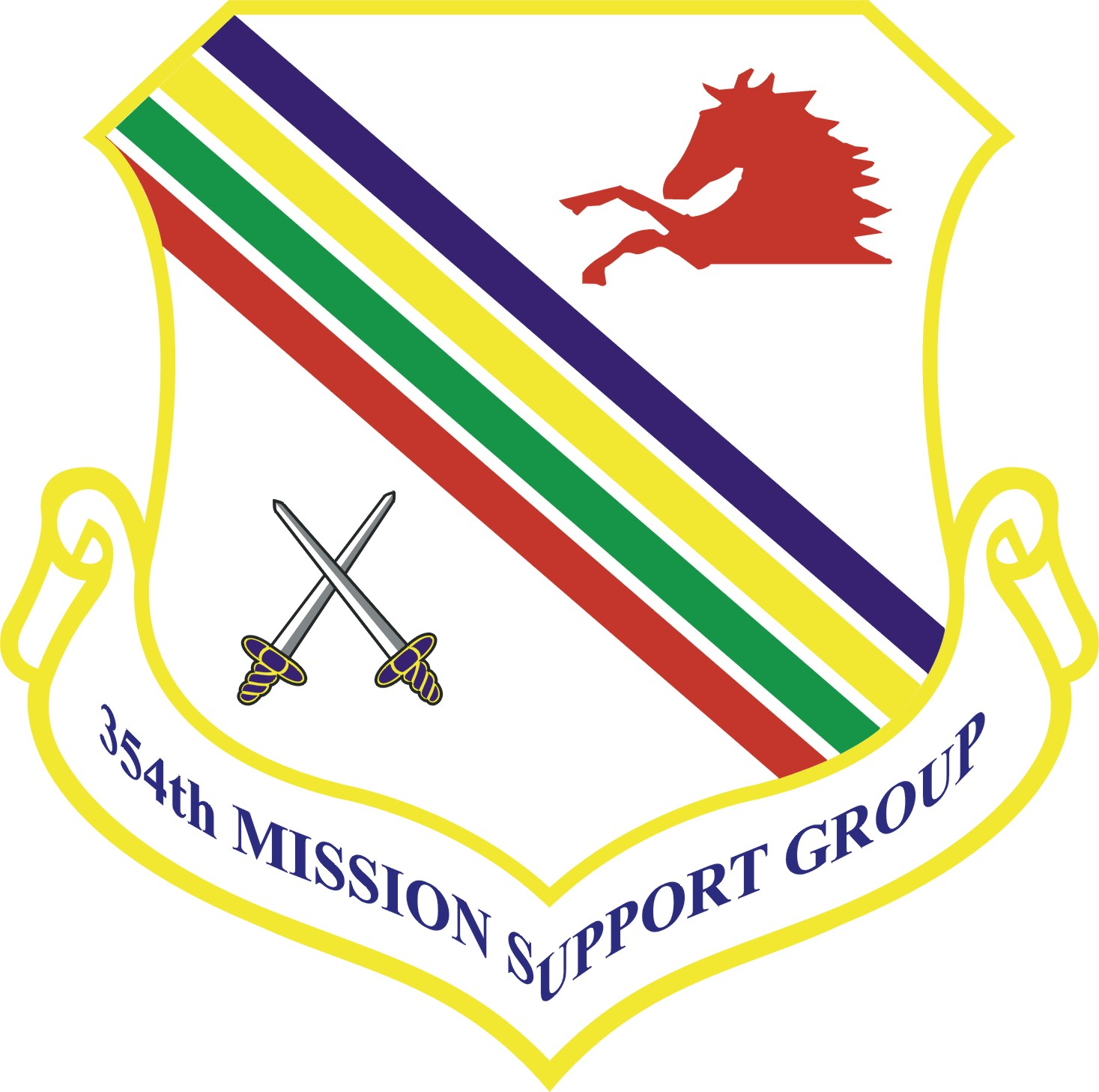

The 354th Mission Support Group supports the 354th Fighter Wing by providing combat-ready forces, equipment, and essential services while sustaining base infrastructure and providing programs to improve quality of life for the Eielson community. From family services to construction and security, the 354th Mission Support Group keeps the physical installation and its personnel performing at peak efficiency, despite the challenging Arctic weather conditions presented by interior Alaska. The group also provides a comfortable home for Eielson's associate units.

Eielson operates much like any town and boasts a population of nearly 10,000 people. Part of the 354th mission is to provide the services and facilities necessary to make Eielson safe, comfortable, and pleasant for the Iceman Team. Craftsmen operate a coal-fired heat and power plant, water plant and wastewater treatment facility, making this installation entirely self-sufficient. Security Forces and Fire Department personnel work to provide a safe environment for families.

The 354th Mission Support Group manages and maintains over 1,500 military housing units and over 400 dormitory rooms. Other activities such as the dining facility, fitness center, library, skills centers, child development center and clubs are vital to the health and morale of everyone who calls Eielson "home."

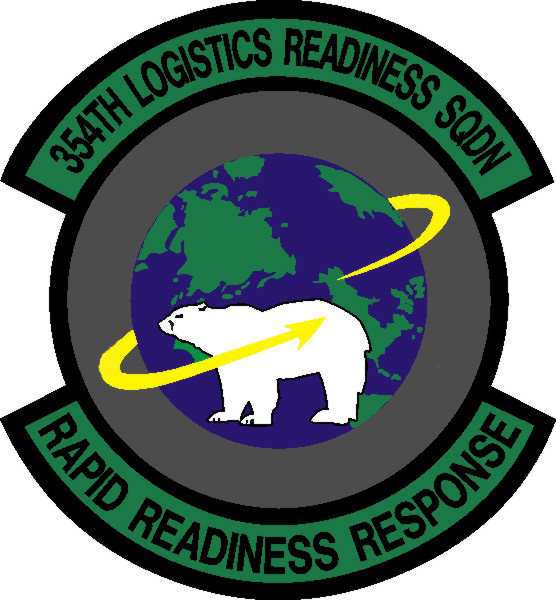

The 354th Logistics Readiness Squadron provides supplies, fuels, cryogenics, equipment, and vehicle resources for the 354th Fighter Wing's F-16, and the 168th Air Refueling Wing's KC-135 aircraft. The squadron ensures the capability to mobilize, provide operational sustainment, and receive cargo and personnel in support of the base wartime taskings.

The 354 LRS is responsible for managing and maintaining the government vehicle fleet which incorporates an immense and diverse snow fleet in addition to all the cargo, passenger and household goods movements for Eielson AFB. The squadron also conducts an extensive base-wide training program in mobility operations for personnel and cargo deployments. To support these missions, LRS stores and issues more than 80,000 line items valued at more than $120 million. LRS receives, stores and issues 28M gallons of aviation fuel, 530K gallons of ground products, and 39K gallons of cryogenic products annually in the fourth largest storage capacity system in the Air Force. Additionally, LRS operates and maintains Eielson's Joint Mobility Complex, capable of processing more than 1,000 deploying personnel per day. The 354 LRS also provides supply, fuels and vehicle support for Red Flag – Alaska exercises.

354th Contracting Squadron leads market research; provides business advice and acquisition planning for solicitation, executes award, and performs contract administration; and ensures performance management for all installation acquisition requirements relating to the alteration, repair and maintenance to existing facilities, architect-engineering design requirements, and brand new construction.

354th Mission Support Group Units

- 354th Civil Engineer Squadron
- 354th Communications Squadron
- 354th Contracting Squadron
- 354th Logistics Readiness Squadron
- 354th Mission Support Squadron
- 354th Security Forces Squadron
- 354th Force Support Squadron

=== 354th Medical Group ===
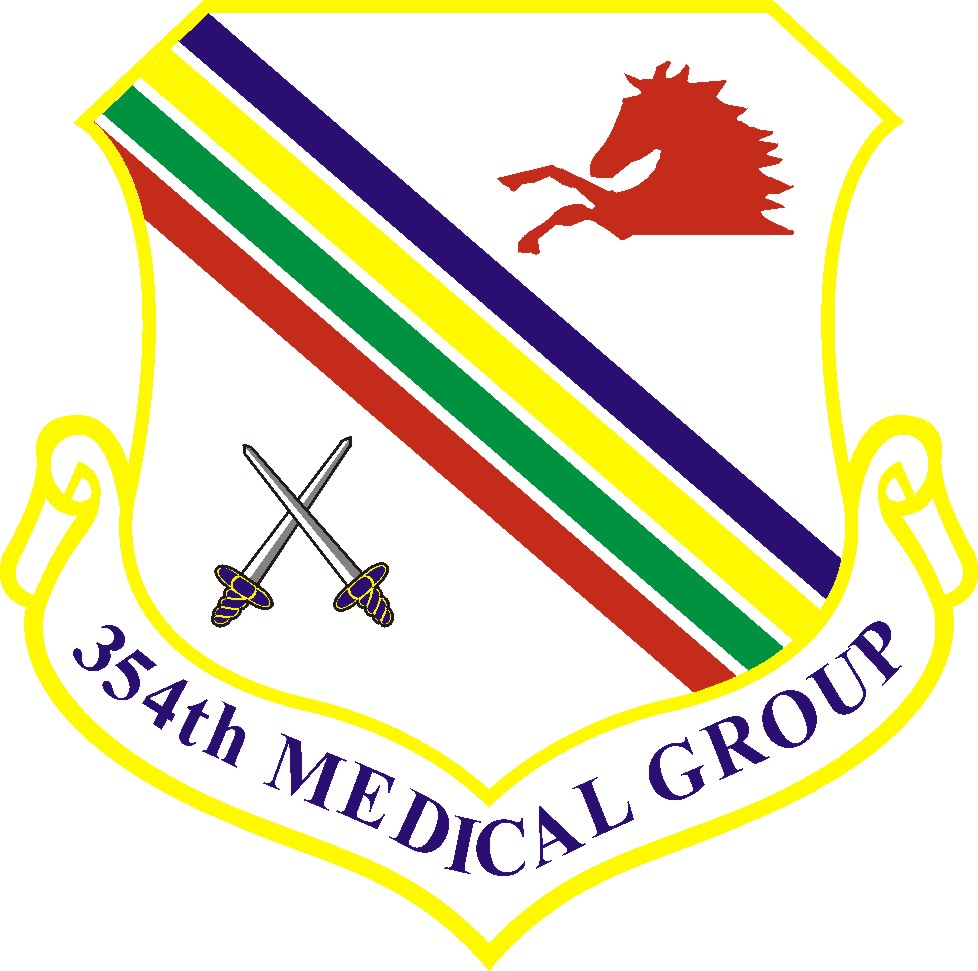

The 354th Medical Group provides outpatient managed healthcare for all active-duty military members and TRICARE eligible beneficiaries living in the Eielson area. In addition, its dental clinic provides care for all active-duty military members.

The medical clinic operates two primary care panels; one staffed by the primary care clinic and the other by the flight surgeons office. In addition, specialty clinics are available for pediatrics, optometry, physical therapy, immunizations, and life skills support. Pharmacy, laboratory and x-ray services are located in the clinic.

Bassett Army Community Hospital (BACH) on Fort Wainwright serves as the Eielson clinic's referral source for some specialty and inpatient care. Fairbanks Memorial Hospital, located twenty miles north of Eielson AFB, is a Level-II trauma center and is utilized as a local referral source for procedures beyond our scope of care. Other specialty services are available by referral to the 3d Medical Group at Elmendorf AFB in Anchorage, Alaska, Madigan Army Medical Center at Fort Lewis, Washington, or civilian care in the Anchorage area as needed.

Dental services available for active-duty members include the full spectrum of general dentistry care, including endodontics, oral surgery, periodontics, and prosthetics. The dental staff also provides educational services to base schools and assists other organizations with dental disease prevention programs. Dental care for dependents is provided through the United Concordia Dental Plan.

354th Medical Group Units

- 354th Dental Squadron
- 354th Medical Operations Squadron
- 354th Medical Support Squadron

== History ==
See 354th Operations Group for additional history and lineage information

=== Cold War ===
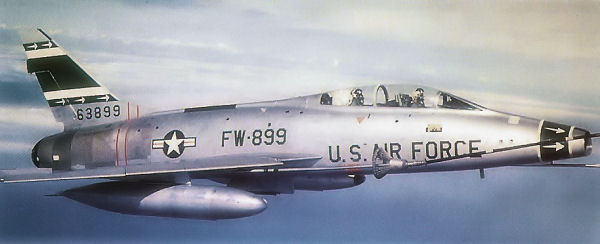
North American F-100F-10-NA Super Sabre Serial 56-3899 of the 356 TFS being aerial refueled over Aviano Italy, 1960

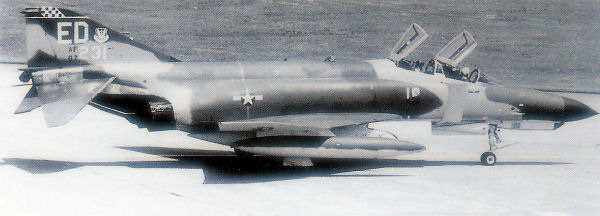
McDonnell Douglas F-4E-34-MC Phantom II, AF Ser. No. 67-0231 of the 16th Tactical Fighter Squadron on TDY from Eglin AFB Florida – Attached to 354th TFW at Kunsan AB South Korea – 1 April 1970. In 1980, this aircraft was sold to the Egyptian Air Force.

On 19 November 1956, the Air Force redesignated the 342d Fighter Day Wing at Myrtle Beach Air Force Base, South Carolina as the 354th Fighter-Day Wing. The 342d Fighter-Day Group's fighter squadrons were redesignated the 353nd, 355th and the 356th Fighter-Day Squadrons. The non-flying support elements of the wing were consolidated into the 354th Air Base Group. The total manpower force of the 354th FDW at the time of its activation was 84 Officers, 3 Warrant Officers and 911 enlisted men. The history, battle honors and colors earned during World War II by the 354th Fighter Group were bestowed on the new Fighter Wing and subordinate groups and squadrons.

On activation, the 354th had several RF-80s and one B-26 Invader aircraft for training. On 15 March 1957, F-100D/F "Super Sabre" fighters were transferred to Myrtle Beach AFB from the 31st Fighter-Bomber Wing at Turner AFB, Georgia. Squadron identification of the 354th's F-100 aircraft could be determined by the tail color of the aircraft. The 353rd was red, the 355th blue and the 356th was green. Each unit also adopted iconic designation; 353rd (red) was designated "Panther" section, the 355th (blue) "Falcon" section, and the 356th (green) "Demon" section. These monikers were incorporated into each unit's (flight, ops, and maintenance units) patches and logos. Those emblems were also emblazoned on each section's planes fuselage (right behind the cockpit, on the A-10A).

25 September 1957, a fourth fighter squadron, the 352 FDS was activated with the 354th FDW from F-100 aircraft drawn from the three existing squadrons. Aircraft of the 352nd had yellow tails.

On 8 July 1958, the 354 FDW the wing's name changed to the 354th Tactical Fighter Wing as part of a worldwide USAF naming reorganization. On 1 October 1962, the 354th Air Base Group support element was renamed the 354th Combat Support Group.

The 354th was committed to NATO, and deployed often to Europe with its F-100s. After the Lebanon Crisis, starting in July 1958, Tactical Air Command began a rotation of combat squadrons to Incirlik AB, Turkey and Aviano AB, Italy in support of NATO alert commitments and Air Force weapons training deployments to the nearby Maniago Range.

On 15 July 1958, the 355th TFS made the first deployment of the 354th TFW to Europe, deploying F-100D/Fs to Aviano AB, Italy for 100 days. The 352nd TFS deployed the next day (16 Jul 58) to stand by during a presidential overthrow in Lebanon.

On 4 September 1961, eighteen F-100 jets from Myrtle Beach were deployed to Hahn Air Base in West Germany during the crisis over Soviet construction of the Berlin Wall.

NATO deployments were made by all four squadrons on a rotating basis until 1965. A deployment was also made by the 354th TFW to Elmendorf AFB, Alaska during February–March 1963.

During the Cuban Missile Crisis in 1962, elements of all four fighter squadrons were deployed to McCoy AFB, FL. The 353rd deployed on 8 October; the 352nd, 355th and 356th deployed on 21 October. After the crisis ended, the 352nd, 355th and 356th returned to Myrtle Beach on 1 December, with the 353rd remaining at McCoy AFB until 20 January 1963.

During the Dominican Republic Crisis of April/May 1965, the 354th deployed the 353rd TFS and more than 400 people and 18 F-100s to Ramey AFB, Puerto Rico, and San Isidro AB, Dominican Republic on 2 May. The squadron returned on 28 May.

During the late 1970s, the 354th TFW's squadrons were part of a joint U.S. military force (along with Army and Marines) called the Rapid Deployment Force. Conceptually, RDF units could be deployed anywhere in the world within 24 hours or less. As part of the RDF, for a few weeks in late 1979 the 354 TFW's squadrons were placed on "alert" status for possible deployment in connection with the Iran Hostage Crisis, with departure within 12-hours of executive order.

=== Vietnam War ===
The Vietnam War drained the 354 TFW at Myrtle Beach, starting in 1965 with its flying squadrons and support personnel being deployed for several years to Spain, Japan, South Korea and South Vietnam. The 354th's first assignments to Vietnam started in July 1965 with the deployment of a sentry dog unit.

This practice of stripping away squadrons and aircraft from their home units and attaching them indefinitely to another wing was a common practice during the 1960s as squadrons (and replacement aircraft) were deployed to support Vietnam.

- The 356th Tactical Fighter Squadron was deployed to Misawa AB, Japan on 16 March 1965. At Misawa, it was attached to the 39th Air Division, whose mission was to support Misawa, Taegu AB and Kunsan AB in South Korea which all had just been reactivated.
- The 353d Tactical Fighter Squadron was deployed and permanently reassigned to the 401st Tactical Fighter Wing at Torrejon Air Force Base, Spain on 27 April 1966.
- The 352d Tactical Fighter Squadron was deployed and permanently reassigned to the 366th Tactical Fighter Wing at Phan Rang Air Base, South Vietnam on 15 August 1966.
- On 3 February 1968 the 355th Tactical Fighter Squadron was deployed to support the 37th Tactical Fighter Wing at Phu Cat Air Base, South Vietnam on 3 February 1968.

After having its fighter squadrons stripped away, the 354 TFW was reassigned on 1 July 1968 to Kunsan Air Base, South Korea. The 354th relieved the temporarily deployed 4th Tactical Fighter Wing.

At Kunsan, the 354 TFW was a composite wing, consisting of the following operational fighter squadrons on rotating temporary duty deployments:

Squadron	Assigned dates	Wing	Home base/aircraft type	Tail code
127 TFS	5 July 1968 – 10 June 1969	184 TFW	Kansas ANG F-100C	BO
166 TFS	5 July 1968 – 10 June 1969	121 TFW	Ohio ANG F-100C	BP
68 TFS	20 June – 9 December 1969	4531 TFW	Homestead AFB F-4E	ZG
560 TFS	23 June – 17 December 1969	4531 TFW	Homestead AFB F-4E	ZF
335 TFS	8 December 1969 – 23 May 1970	4 TFW	Seymour Johnson AFB F-4E	SB
334 TFS	16 December 1969 – 31 May 1970	4 TFW	Seymour Johnson AFB F-4E	SA
478 TFS	21 May – 14 June 1970	474 TFW	Takhli RTAFB F-4E	ZE
16 TFS	29 May – 14 June 1970	33 TFW	Eglin AFB F-4E	ED

Initially at Kunsan, the 354th supported two F-100C Air National Guard fighter squadrons which were deployed to replace the Regular Air Force units that had been rushed there in Operation Combat Fox, the response to the seizure of USS Pueblo. The 354th Combat Support Group at Kunsan consisted primarily of ANG and Air Force Reservists from other units, with these personnel being assigned to the headquarters, support, supply and maintenance squadrons.

In some respects, the Air Guardsmen in South Korea had much more difficult assignments than their counterparts in South Vietnam. With the exception of personnel in the two fighter squadrons, most Air Guardsmen in South Korea were individuals who had been transferred from their original units after mobilization and reassigned to new organizations. This wholesale violation of unit integrity had a severe impact on morale and required time-consuming reorganization.

Ironically, the ANG personnel assigned to the 354th at Kunsan had to rebuild the support service units that had been stripped from them in the United States after their mobilization. This caused many public complaints by disgruntled Air Guardsmen. Although these problems were gradually resolved, many Air Guardsmen believed that they could have been avoided if their original units had deployed overseas intact.

The performance of the ANG units at Kunsan in 1968 – 69 suggested the prerequisites of effective air reserve programs and paved the way for adoption of the total force policy in 1970 which exists today.

On 10 June 1969, the ANG squadrons returned to the United States after the crew of the Pueblo were released, and for 10 days in South Korea the 354 TFW was again without tactical components.

The experience of the F-100's in Korea showed the Air Force that the F-100C was not a good air defense aircraft. The F-100s were aging and clearly unsuited to the most pressing operational responsibilities in the event of an attack by the North Koreans. In addition, the F-100's were slow in attaining altitude and lacked an effective all-weather, air-to-air combat capability, essential in Korea. Consequently, the 354th transitioned from the F-100s of the ANG to F-4E Phantoms deploying from CONUS-based Regular USAF units.

On 15 April 1969, a Navy EC-121 reconnaissance plane was shot down by North Koreans about 90 miles (140 km) southeast of the North Korean port of Chongjin. U.S. radar tracked two Korean People's Air Force (KPAF) MiGs before the aircraft was shot down. They attempted to warn the aircraft, but the MiGs caught up with the slow-flying aircraft. All of its 31 crew members were killed. The bodies of only two crew members were recovered. Error was blamed on a North Korean ground-to-air controller's command and control error to the pilot.

As a result of the heightened tensions, on 23 April the 421 Tactical Fighter Squadron was established at Kunsan and attached to the 354 TFW. F-4Es from Eglin AFB were deployed to Kunsan and assigned to the 421st, with support personnel from the 4th TFS – deployed from Eglin to Da Nang Air Base South Vietnam were sent TDY to Kunsan to support the 421st.

At the end of tensions on 26 June 1969, the 421 TFS was inactivated at Kunsan, with the aircraft being sent to Da Nang as replacements along with the TDY personnel.

On 14 June 1970, the 354 TFW at Kunsan was inactivated with the new 54th Tactical Fighter Wing being activated in place. The 16th and 478th TFSs were transferred and attached to the 54th.

=== A-7D Corsair II era ===
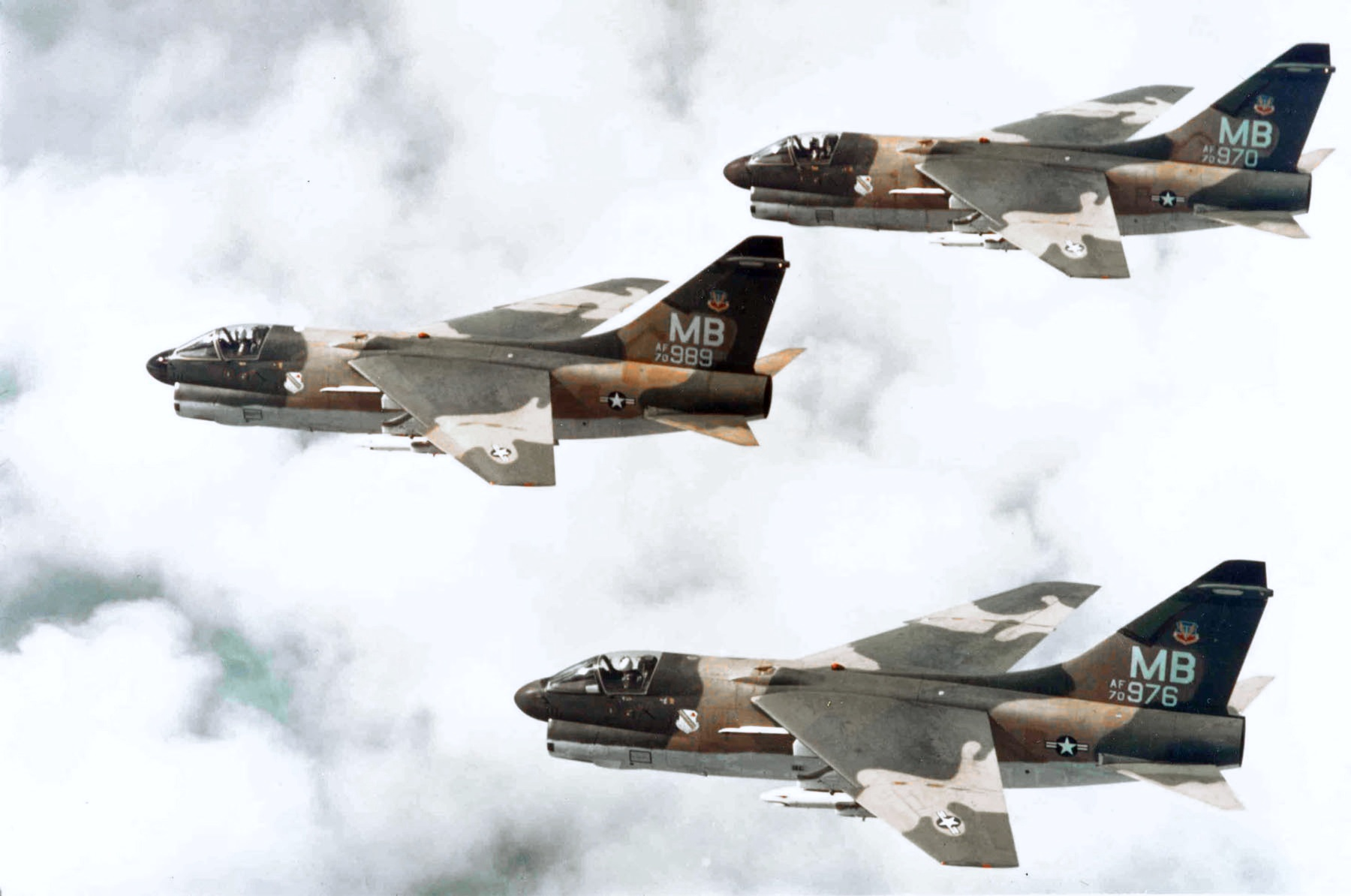
Ling-Temco-Vought A-7D-7-CV Corsair IIs 70-0976, 70-0989 and 70-0970 of the 354th Tactical Fighter Wing - 1971. 976 and 989 were retired to AMARC in 1992, 970 is on permanent display at the Museum of the United States Air Force, Wright-Patterson AFB, Ohio.

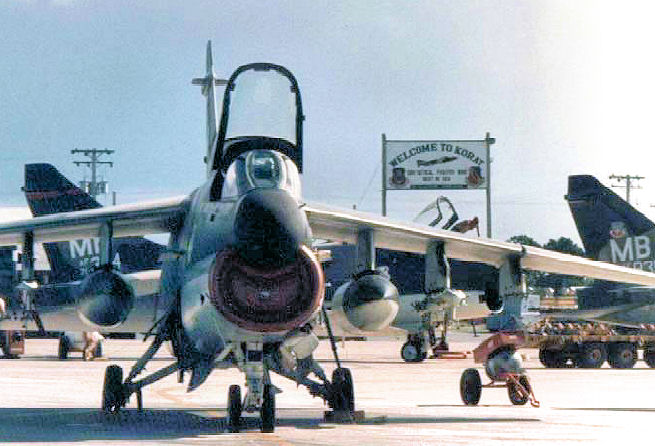
A-7Ds of the 354th Tactical Fighter Wing (Advanced) deployed at Korat Royal Thai Air Force Base, 1972

The 354th Tactical Fighter Wing was re-activated and transferred (without personnel or equipment) to Myrtle Beach AFB, SC on 15 June 1970, absorbing the resources of the 4554th TFW at Myrtle Beach AFB, SC. The 354 TFW was charged with combat crew training in T-33s and with becoming proficient in A-7D aircraft, with the first aircraft arriving in November 1970

On 1 November 1970, the 355 TFS was reactivated and was reassigned to the 354 TFW, being the first Myrtle Beach squadron to be equipped with A-7D's.

The 4456th Tactical Fighter Squadron was activated as placeholder unit on 15 January 1971 to receive new A-7D aircraft. On 15 May 1971, the 356 TFS returned from Misawa AB Japan, and was reassigned to the 354 TFW, absorbing the assets of the 4556th TFS which was inactivated.

On 15 July 1971, the 353 TFS returned from Torrejon AB, Spain, and was reassigned to the 354 TFW, receiving its complement of A-7D's. The 511th TFS was inactivated and redesignated the 354th TFS at Davis–Monthan AFB, Arizona as part of the 355th TFW's reactivation.

Initially, separate tail codes were assigned to the various squadrons of the wing. These were: 353 TFS "MR", 355 TFS "MB" and 356 TFS "MN". In 1972, the squadron tail codes were abolished and all 354 TFW standardized on "MB" for Myrtle Beach AFB. Squadrons were identified by a painted color stripe on the tail of the aircraft, red for the 353d, blue for the 355th and green for the 356th.

On 15 May 1972 the 4554th Tactical Fighter Replacement Squadron was activated as a training squadron. The T-33's and T-29 were assigned for this mission. The 4554th was inactivated on 15 October 1975 and its aircraft sent to the Aerospace Maintenance and Regeneration Center.

However, the 354 TFW did not remain long at Myrtle Beach AFB. In September 1972 the wing split into Rear and Advanced echelons. In October 1972 the 353, 355, and 356 TFSs deployed A-7D's to Korat Royal Thai AFB, Thailand.

This marked the first combat deployment of the A-7D into Southeast Asia. This operation was known as Constant Guard VI.

The 354 TFW (Advanced) commenced combat operations from Korat on 16 October 1972. In addition to the deployment to Korat, a small number of personnel from the 354th were deployed to Bien Hoa Air Base South Vietnam where they performed turnaround service on A-7Ds through 11 February 1973.

From Korat, the 354th interdicted lines of communications to halt the flow of North Vietnamese supplies to enemy units in South Vietnam, provided close air support to ground troops, and escorted surface ship convoys up the Mekong River to Phnom Penh, Cambodia. In November 1972, the 354th took over the Combat Search and Rescue role formerly assigned to the A-1 "Sandy" aircraft, and during the Linebacker II campaign assisted in 22 rescues of downed airmen while simultaneously flying over 4,000 combat sorties. The wing earned the Presidential Unit Citation for its Vietnam war service from September 1972 through January 1973.

In March 1973, A-7D aircraft drawn from the deployed Myrtle Beach squadrons were formed into the 3d Tactical Fighter Squadron and permanently assigned to the host 388 TFW at Korat. The 3 TFS's A-7D's were tail coded "JH" and remained at Korat until the base's closure. In May 1975, former Myrtle Beach A-7D's were used in the SS Mayaguez operation, the last combat action of the United States in Southeast Asia.

In addition to its Myrtle Beach squadrons, the 354 TFW (Advanced) had the following temporary A-7D squadrons attached while at Korat:

Squadron	Assigned dates	Wing	Home base
354 TFS	14 January – 5 July 1973	355 TFW	Davis–Monthan AFB, Arizona
74 TFS	5 July – 28 December 1973	23 TFW	England AFB, Louisiana
358 TFS	28 December 1973 – 15 May 1974	355 TFW	Davis–Monthan AFB, Arizona

The 354 TFW (Advanced) flew combat operations in Vietnam until mid-January 1973, in Laos until 22 February 1973, and in Cambodia until 15 August 1973.

The last shot fired in anger by United States military forces in Southeast Asia was fired by an A-7D of the deployed 353 TFS assigned to Korat RTAFB on 15 July 1973. In October the wing rotated personnel at Korat once again, but with the establishment of the 3 TFS in Thailand and the end of American combat in Southeast Asia, the mission of the 354th was ended. Some additional aircraft and equipment were transferred to the 388 TFW, and on 23 May 1974 the wing returned from Thailand and the Advanced and Rear echelons were recombined at Myrtle Beach AFB.

On 1 February 1974, the 354th began a 15-month deployment to Howard AFB in the Panama Canal Zone to support operation "Coronet Cove". This entailed rotating a contingent of aircraft, aircrews and maintenance technicians to Panama on 45-day cycles to provide close air support for US Army training exercises for the air defense of the Panama Canal.

In April 1974, A-7D's were deployed from Myrtle Beach to NAS Barbers Point, Hawaii for exercises with Army and Marine Corps units. Also T-33A aircraft were deployed to McConnell AFB, Kansas, to support the USAF Tactical Air Weapons Center's comparative flight evaluation of the A-7D and the A-10A aircraft.

354th TFW A-7D's To ANG Units			Former 354 TFW aircraft flying in the Air National Guard – 1979
State	Unit	Location	Former 354 TFW aircraft flying in the Air National Guard – 1979
Colorado	140 TFW/120 TFS	Buckley ANGB	Former 354 TFW aircraft flying in the Air National Guard – 1979
Iowa	132 TFW/124 TFS	Des Moines IAP	Former 354 TFW aircraft flying in the Air National Guard – 1979
Michigan	127 TFW/107 TFS	Selfridge ANGB	Former 354 TFW aircraft flying in the Air National Guard – 1979
Ohio	121 TFW/166 TFS	Rickenbacker ANGB	Former 354 TFW aircraft flying in the Air National Guard – 1979
Oklahoma	138 TFG/166 TFS	Tulsa IAP	Former 354 TFW aircraft flying in the Air National Guard – 1979
Pennsylvania	112 TFG/146 TFS	Greater Pittsburgh IAP	Former 354 TFW aircraft flying in the Air National Guard – 1979
South Carolina	169 TFG/157 TFS	McEntire ANGB	Former 354 TFW aircraft flying in the Air National Guard – 1979
South Dakota	114 TFG/175 TFS	Sioux Falls IAP	Former 354 TFW aircraft flying in the Air National Guard – 1979
Virginia	192 TFG/149 TFS	Richmond IAP/Byrd Field	Former 354 TFW aircraft flying in the Air National Guard – 1979

A phaseout of the A-7D at Myrtle Beach AFB started in the summer of 1974, with the A-7D's being transferred to Air National Guard units. These transfers continued until 1978, when the last A-7D was sent to the South Carolina ANG. In addition, the T-33's and VT-29 of the inactivated 4554th were retired and sent to AMARC in 1976. The former Myrtle Beach A-7D's continued service in the Air National Guard until the late 1980s, with the last at Rickenbacker ANGB (Ohio), Des Moines (Iowa), Tulsa (Oklahoma) and Springfield (Ohio) being replaced by the F-16 by mid-1993. By the end of 1998, all were disposed of by AMARC.

=== A-10A Thunderbolt II era ===
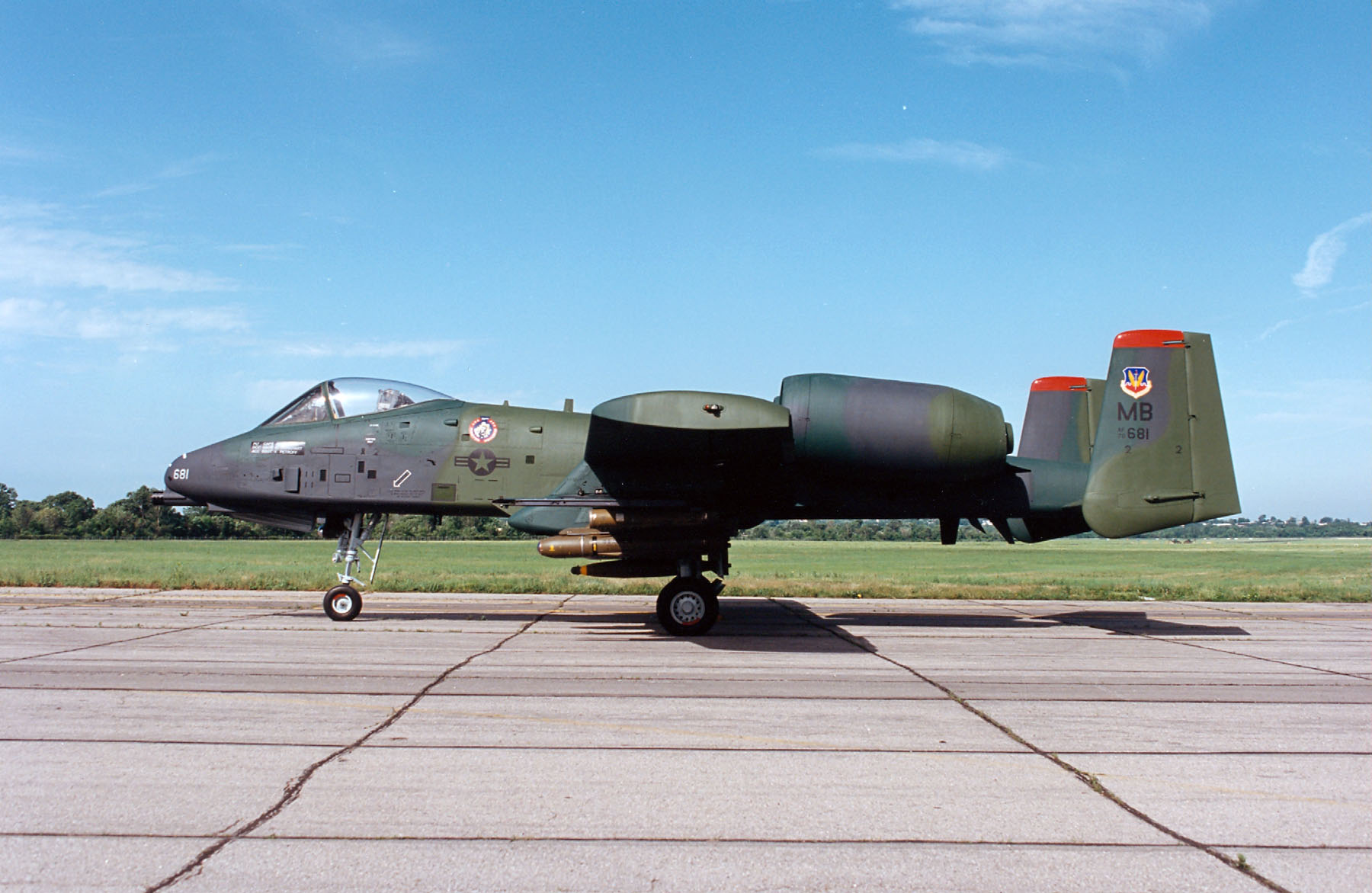
Fairchild Republic A-10A Thunderbolt II s/n 78-0681 displayed in markings of the 353rd Tactical Fighter Squadron/354th Tactical Fighter Wing at the National Museum of the United States Air Force.

On 22 March 1975, an agreement was made for joint civilian-military aviation activities at the base. Construction began of what is today known as Myrtle Beach International Airport on the northeast side of the runway on 19 July 1975. On 20 April 1977 an agreement between the City of Myrtle Beach and the United States Department of Defense was signed which incorporated the area of Myrtle Beach International Airport into the city.

The 354th converted to A-10A aircraft in 1977, with the 354th being the first operational A-10A wing in the USAF, achieving initial combat readiness with the Thunderbolt II during the summer of 1978.

With the A-10 aircraft, the 354th returned to its pre-Vietnam era North Atlantic Treaty Organization (NATO) commitment, deploying aircraft and personnel to Europe supporting the COMET, CORONET and CRESTED CAP exercises. These deployments were designed to exercise CONUS-based Air Force squadrons on long-range deployment capabilities and to familiarize the personnel with the European theater of operations.

354th TFW NATO Deployments 1970s/1980s
Squadron	Deployment dates	Deployed to station	Exercise name	Aircraft type (number)
356 TFS	August–September 1976	Lechfeld FRG	Coronet REDCOAT	A-7D (18)
355 TFS	January–February 1979	Nordholz FRG	Coronet HOOF	A-10A (18)
353 TFS	September 1980	Leck FRG	Coronet MACH	A-10A (12)
354 TFW	October 1981	Hahn FRG	Coronet FRONTIER	A-10A (8)
353 TFS	October–November 1981	Nordholz FRG	Coronet BOOT	A-10A (12)
353 TFS	August–September 1982	Leck FRG	Crested Cap	A-10A (12)
355 TFS	August–September 1984	Nordholz FRG	Crested STEELER	A-10A (12)
353 TFS	July–August 1985	RAF Woodbridge UK	Crested Comet	A-10A (12)
355 TFS	April–May 1987	RAF Bentwaters UK	Cornet DELTA	A-10A (12)
353 TFS	June–July 1989	RAF Bentwaters UK	Cornet PYTHON	A-10A (12)
356 TFS	August–September 1989	RAF Bentwaters UK	Cornet VENOM	A-10A (12)
355 TFS	April–May 1990	Verona – Villafranca IT	Coronet Rodeo	A-10A (8)

During these NATO deployments, exercises with Army infantry and armored units were conducted to enhance the Close Air Support role in Europe.

=== Desert Shield/Storm ===
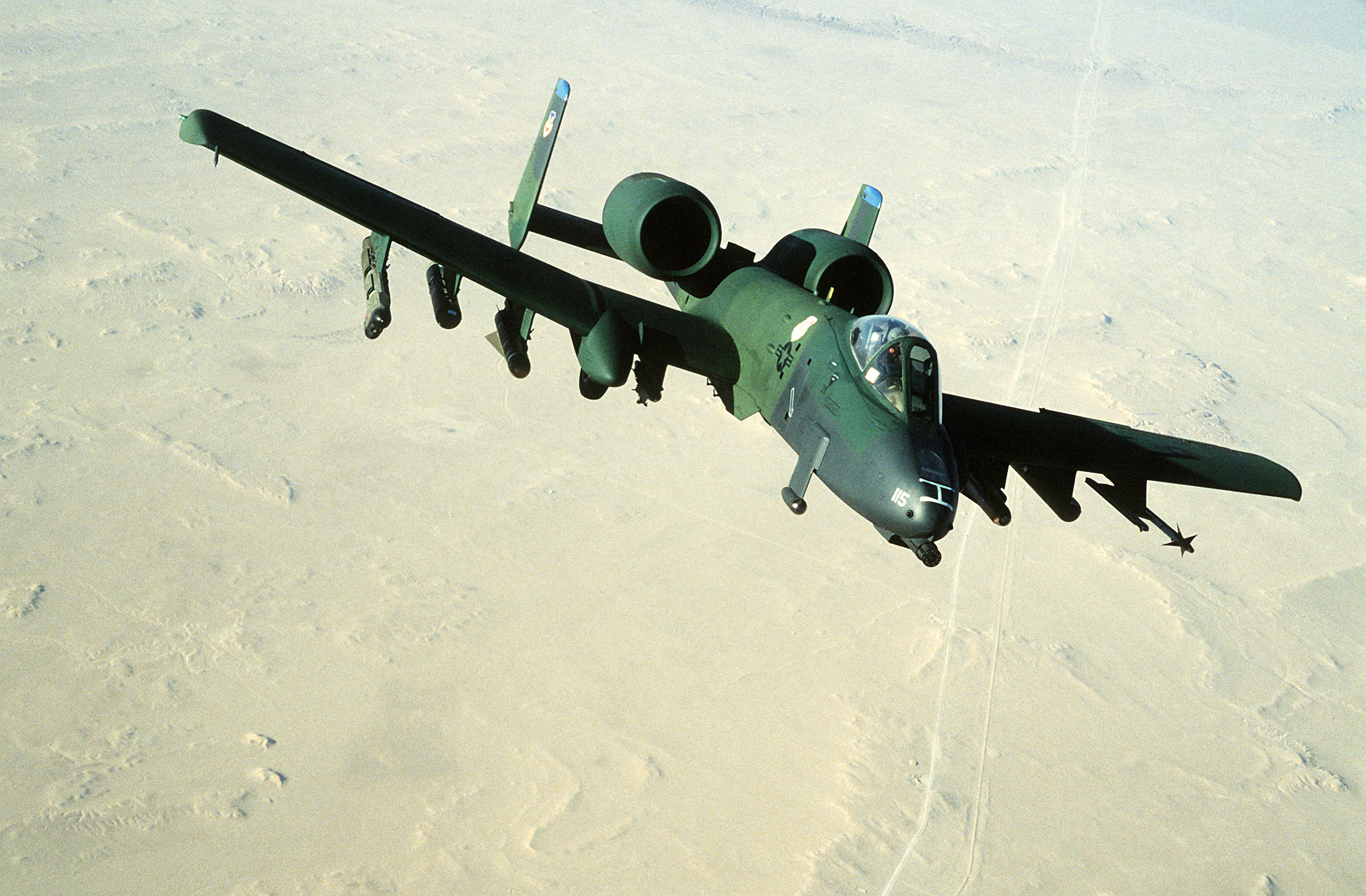
A-10A Thunderbolt II from the 355th Tactical Fighter Squadron during Operation Desert Shield.

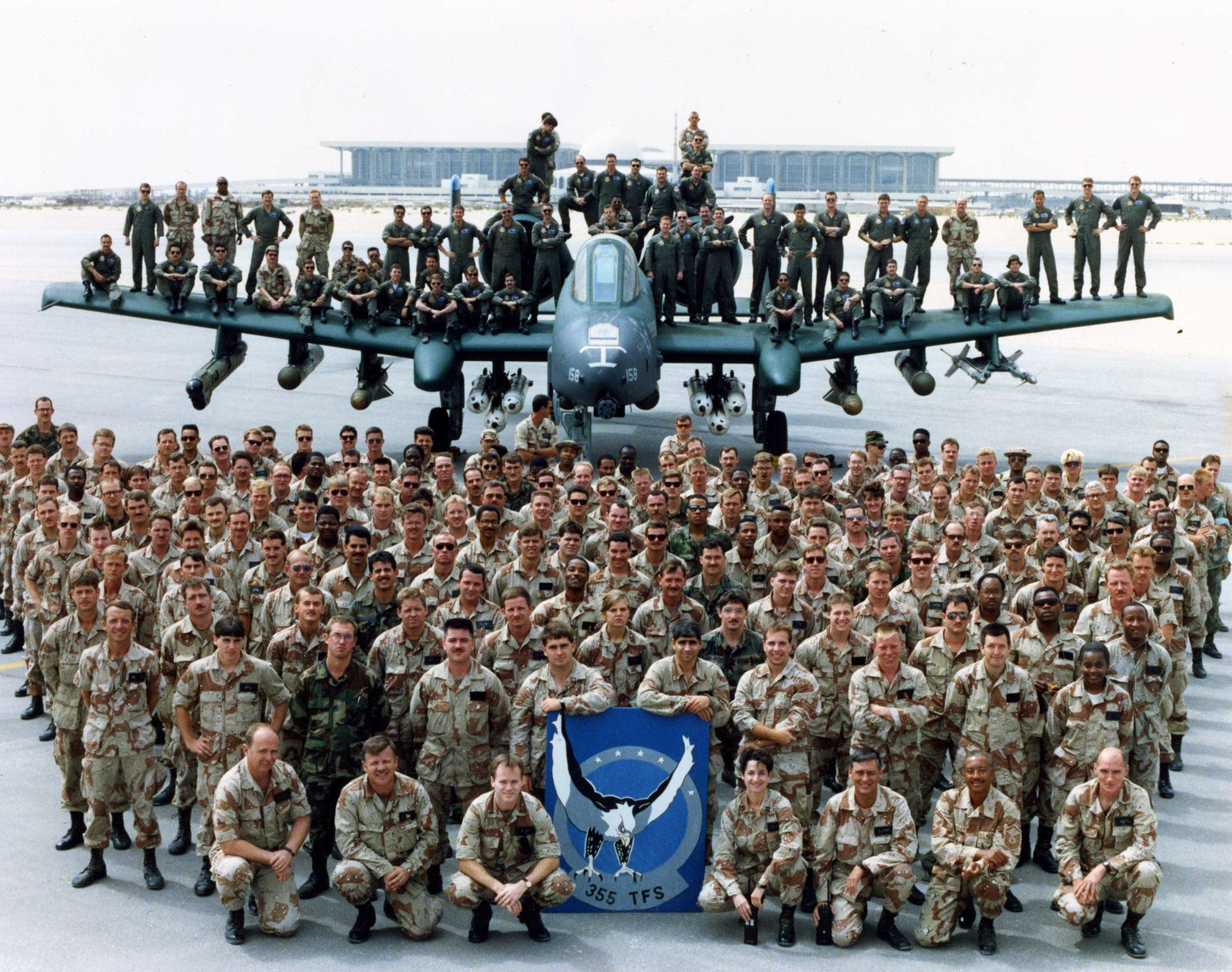
Photo of the 355th Tactical Fighter Squadron Personnel – March 1991 – King Fahd International Airport after victory in Operation Desert Storm

In 1980, the 354th was allocated to President Jimmy Carter's Rapid Deployment Force, formally known as the Rapid Deployment Joint Task Force (RDJTF). In 1983 the RDJTF became a separate unified command known as the U.S. Central Command (CENTCOM), focusing on the Middle East.

Within CENTCOM, The 354th was assigned to the United States Central Command Air Forces (USCENTAF). Starting in 1985, the 354th's A-10 aircraft and personnel were deployed to Cairo West AB, Egypt for BRIGHT STAR exercises. BRIGHT STAR deployments also occurred in 1987 and 1989 from Myrtle Beach AFB.

With the outbreak of the Kuwait crisis in August 1990, Myrtle Beach AFB deployed the 353 and 355 TFS on 15 August 1990 to King Fahd International Airport, near Dammam, Saudi Arabia. At the time of the deployment, King Fhad was under construction. At King Fahd, the 354 TFW (Provisional) was formed. The 354 TFW was one of the first USAF units deployed to the Persian Gulf for Operation Desert Shield.

During Operation Desert Storm, aircraft assigned to the 354th initially flew against early-warning radar and Scud missile sites, as well as search-and-rescue missions of downed coalition pilots. When the ground attack began in late February 1991, the 354th performed its ground support mission, inflicting heavy damage to Iraqi armor and artillery emplacements, as well as cutting off enemy supply lines.

The 354 TFW (P) consisted of 131 A/OA-10A aircraft from the following bases:

Tail code	Squadron	Wing	Home AFB
AR	511 TFS	10 TFW	RAF Alconbury UK
EL	74 TFS	23 TFW	England AFB LA
EL	76 TFS	23 TFW	England AFB LA
MB	353 TFS	354 TFW	Myrtle Beach AFB SC
MB	355 TFS	354 TFW	Myrtle Beach AFB SC
MB	356 TFS	354 TFW	Myrtle Beach AFB SC
NO	706 TFS	926 TFG	NAS New Orleans LA
NF	23 TASS	602 TACW	Davis – Monthan AFB AZ

The 354th returned home from the Gulf on 25 March 1991

On 1 October 1991, the 354 TFW was redesignated the 354th Fighter Wing with the inactivation of Tactical Air Command (TAC) and the wing's reassignment to the new Air Combat Command (ACC).

=== Inactivation ===
Inactivation Ceremony Program – 31 March 1993

After the end of the Cold War, reductions in defense spending led to the military reducing the size of the armed forces, and the number of facilities both in the United States as well as overseas. In July 1991, the Base Realignment and Closure Commission recommended the closure of Myrtle Beach Air Force Base and that the Air Force redistribute all aircraft to modernize other Active and Reserve Component units.

The disposition of the A-10 aircraft was as follows:

- 31 March 1992 – 355th Fighter Squadron inactivated. Aircraft sent to 21 TFS / 353 TFW Shaw Air Force Base, South Carolina.
- 30 June 1992 – 356th Fighter Squadron inactivated. Aircraft sent to existing A-10 Air National Guard units.
- 15 December 1992 – 353d Fighter Squadron inactivated. Aircraft sent to 75 FS / 23d Wing Pope Air Force Base, North Carolina.

The 354th Fighter Wing and all supporting groups and squadrons were inactivated on 31 March 1993. Myrtle Beach AFB was closed as scheduled, ending military control over the facility.

=== Reactivation in Alaska ===
On 20 August 1993, the 354th Fighter Wing was re-established at Eielson AFB, Alaska, with a new mission and organization. No personnel or equipment were affected by the change. This change was part of a service-wide effort to preserve the lineage of the Air Force's most honored wings. The 353d and 355th Fighter Squadrons were also reactivated at Eielson.

From 2000 to present, the wing trained for the defense of northwestern North America and for contingency operations worldwide.

On 15 August 2007, as a result of 2005 Base Realignment and Closure Commission action, the 354 FW was realigned to become strictly an F-16-equipped organization. The wing's 355th Fighter Squadron (355 FS) was inactivated and all 355 FS A-10 aircraft were redistributed to other A-10 units. The 18th Fighter Squadron was redesignated as the 18th Aggressor Squadron (18 AS) and remains equipped with the F-16.

New F-35s began arriving for the wing in April 2020.

=== Lineage ===
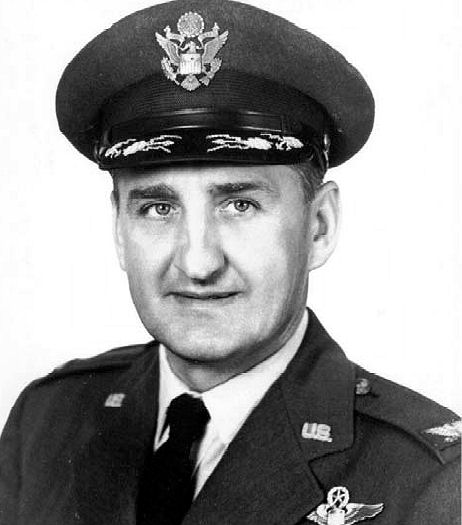
Col Francis S. Gabreski, first wing commander, 354 FDW/TFW, Myrtle Beach AFB

- Established as 354th Fighter-Day Wing on 26 September 1956

Activated on 19 November 1956 replacing the 342d Fighter Day Wing*
Redesignated: 354th Tactical Fighter Wing on 1 July 1958
Redesignated: 354th Fighter Wing on 1 October 1991
Inactivated on 31 March 1993

- Activated on 20 August 1993.

*Note: The 342d Fighter Day Wing was activated at Myrtle Beach AFB, South Carolina on 25 July 1956. The unit was redesignated as the 354th Fighter-Day Wing on 19 November 1956, absorbing all the wing's components.

=== Assignments ===
- Ninth Air Force, 19 November 1956
- Twelfth Air Force, 1 July 1960
- Ninth Air Force, l January 1962
- 833d Air Division, 1 October 1964
- Fifth Air Force, 5 July 1968

Attached to: 4th Tactical Fighter Wing, 5–24 July 1968
Attached to: Detachment 1, HQ Fifth Air Force [Fifth Air Force ADVON], 25 July 1968 – 14 June 1970

- Ninth Air Force, 15 June 1970 – 31 March 1993

Attached to: (as HQ 354 TFW (Advanced)) Pacific Air Forces Thirteenth Air Force

Further attached for control to Seventh Air Force, 14 October 1972 – 18 May 1974.

Attached to: (as HQ 354 TFW (Provisional)) United States Central Command Air Forces, 15 August 1990 – 25 March 1991

- Eleventh Air Force, 20 August 1993 – present

=== Components ===
Groups

- 354th Fighter-Day (later, 354th Operations): 19 November 1956 – 25 September 1957; 20 August 1993 – present
- 455th Fighter-Day: attached 19 November 1956 – 1 July 1957.

Assigned Squadrons

- 18th Fighter (later, 18th Aggressor): 20 August 1993 – present
- 20th Helicopter: 16 July 1959 – 8 March 1960
- 127th Tactical Fighter: 5 July 1968 – 10 June 1969
- 166th Tactical Fighter: 5 July 1968 – 10 June 1969
- 352d Fighter-Day (later, 352d Tactical Fighter): 25 September 1957 – 15 August 1966
- 353d Fighter (later, 353d Fighter-Day; 353d Tactical Fighter; 353d Fighter; 353d Combat Training)

15 November 1942 – 31 March 1946; 25 September 1957 – 27 April 1966; 15 July 1971 – 15 December 1992; 20 August 1993 – 4 September 2003; 1 October 2006 – present

- 355th Fighter (later, 355th Fighter-Day; 355th Tactical Fighter; 355th Fighter)

15 November 1942 – 31 March 1946; 25 September 1957 – 22 April 1968; 1 November 1970 – 31 March 1992; 20 August 1993 – 15 August 2007

- 356th Fighter (later, 356th Fighter-Day; 356th Tactical Fighter): 15 November 1942 – 31 March 1946; 25 September 1957 – 29 November 1965; 15 May 1971 – 30 June 1992
- 511th Tactical Fighter: 15 June 1970 – 15 July 1971.
- 4430th Combat Crew Training: 15 June 1970 – 31 July 1972
- 4456th Tactical Fighter: 15 January – 15 May 1971
- 4554th Tactical Fighter Replacement: 15 May 1972 – 15 October 1975.

=== Stations assigned ===
- Myrtle Beach Air Force Base, South Carolina (November 1956 – July 1968)

Major Deployments:

Adana AB, Turkey, 15 July – 26 October 1958 (Lebanon Crisis, "Operation Double Trouble")
Aviano AB, Italy, 19 May – 17 September 1959; 10 September 1960 – 16 January 1961; 7 July – 14 October 1962; 15 June – 28 August 1964 and 2 July – 25 September 1965
Hahn AB, West Germany, 5 September – 19 November 1961 (Berlin Crisis)
McCoy AFB, Florida, 21 October – 1 December 1962 (Cuban Missile Crisis)
Palam Afld, New Delhi, India, 7 – 18 May 1963
Dhahran Airfield, Saudi Arabia, 15 September – 16 December 1963
Incirlik AB, Turkey, 3 July – 17 September 1963; 4 December 1965 – 23 April 1966
Orland, Norway, 8–15 June 1964
San Isidro AB, Dominican Republic, 2–28 May 1965 (Dominican Crisis)
Ramey AFB, Puerto Rico, 2–28 May 1965 (Dominican Crisis)

Non-Operational, 22 April – 2 July 1968

- Kunsan AB, South Korea, (2 July 1968 – 14 June 1970)
- Myrtle Beach AFB, South Carolina (14 June 1970 – 31 March 1993)

HQ 354 TFW (Advanced), Korat Royal Thai Air Force Base, Thailand, 14 October 1972 – 18 May 1974
HQ 354 TFW (Provisional), King Fahd International Airport, Saudi Arabia, 15 August 1990 – 25 March 1991

- Eielson AFB, Alaska (20 August 1993 – present)

ALG = Advanced Landing Ground References for lineage, assignments, components and stations

=== Major aircraft flown ===
- RF-80 Shooting Star, 1956
- F-100 Super Sabre (1956–1969)
- F-4 Phantom II (1969–1970)
- A-7 Corsair II (1970–1978)
- A-10 Thunderbolt II (1977–2007)
- F-16 Fighting Falcon (1993 – present)
- F-35A Lightning II (2020 - present)
