= List of World War II aces from the United States =

This is a list of fighter aces in World War II from United States. For other countries see List of World War II flying aces by country

== Aces ==
Name	Branch	Victories	Awards	Notes
Robert W. Abernathy	USAAF	5	DFC	
Fred T. Ackerman	USN	5	SS	
Burnell W. Adams	USAAF	7	SS	
Charles E. Adams Jr.	USAAF	6	DFC	
Fletcher E. Adams	USAAF	9	DFC	KIA
Robert H. Adams	USAAF	5	DFC	MIA
John M. Ainlay	USAAF	8	SS	
Donald N. Aldrich	USMC	20	NC, DFC	KIA 3 May 1947
Richard L. Alexander	Royal Canadian Air Force, USAAF	5	SS, DFC	POW 30 May 1944
John R. Alison	USAAF	6	DSC, SS	
Calvin D. Allen Jr.	USAAF	7	SS	
David W. Allen	USAAF	8	SS	
William H. Allen	USAAF	5	DFC	"Ace in a day"
Stuart C. Alley Jr.	USMC	5	DFC	
Ernest J. Ambort	USAAF	5	DFC	
Robert H. Ammon	USAAF	5	DFC	
Dudley Moore Amoss	USAAF	5.5	SS	POW March 1945
Benjamin C. Amsden	USN	5	DFC	
Leslie E. Andersen	USAAF	5		
Alexander L. Anderson	USN	5.5	NC	"Ace in a day" 16 February 1945
Charles F. Anderson Jr.	USAAF	10	LOM	KIA 19 April 1944
Clarence E. "Bud" Anderson	USAAF	16.25	DFC (5)	
Richard H. Anderson	USAAF	5	DSC	"Ace in a day" 25 May 1945
Robert H. Anderson	USN	8.5	NC, DFC	"Ace in a day" 14 December 1944. KIFA 5 June 1945
William Y. Anderson	USAAF	7	SS	Born in Sweden, he is Sweden's only flying ace
Wyman D. Anderson	USAAF	6	SS	
Stephen W. Andrew	USAAF	9	SS	POW 2 July 1944
Stanley O. Andrews	USAAF	6	SS, DFC (2)	
Lester L. Arasmith	USAAF	6		
Lee A. Archer	USAAF	5	DFC	
David B. Archibald	USAAF	5		"Ace in a day" and POW 18 December 1944
William E. Aron	USAAF	5	DFC	MIA 22 April 1945
Robert W. Aschenbrener	USAAF	10	DSC	Shot down on 25 December 1944 and evaded capture for 27 days before rescue
Abner M. Aust	USAAF	5		
Eugene D. Axtel	USAAF	5	DFC	P-61 night fighter ace
George C. Axtell	USMC	6	NC, DFC	"Ace in a day" 22 April 1945
Donald A. Baccus	USAAF	5	SS	
Jack A. Bade	USAAF	5	DSC	KIFA 2 May 1963
Oscar C. Bailey	USN	5	SS, DFC	
Robert Baird	USMC	6	NC, SS, DFC	Only Marine night fighter ace
Douglas Baker	USN	16.33	SS (2), DFC (4)	MIA 14 December 1944
Ellis C. Baker Jr.	USAAF	6	DFC	
Robert M. Baker	USMC	7	DFC	
Fred E. Bakutis	USN	7.5	NC, LOM, DFC (2)	Shot down October 1944 and spent one week adrift before rescue
Donald L. Balch	USMC	5	DFC (2)	
Frank B. Baldwin	USMC	5	DFC (2)	
Henry W. Balsiger	USN	5.33	DFC	
Raymond M. Bank	USAAF	5	DFC	POW 2 March 1945
Ernest E. Bankey Jr.	USAAF	9.5	DSC, SS	"Ace in a day" 27 December 1944
John Lawrence Banks	USN	8.5	DFC (2)	
William M. Banks	USAAF	9	SS	
Bruce M. Barackman	USN	5	DFC (3)	
Rex T. Barber	USAAF	5	NC	
Frederic A. Bardshar	USN	7.5	SS, LOM, DFC (3)	
James D. Bare	USN	~5		
Robert M. Barkey	USAAF	5	DFC	
Lloyd G. Barnard	USN	8	NC, DFC	"Ace in a day" 15 June 1944
James M. Barnes	USN	6	NC	KIFA 2 July 1945
Truman S. Barnes	USAAF	5		
Percy R. Bartelt	American Volunteer Group	5		
William E. Bartling	American Volunteer Group	5		
John W. Bartol	USN	5	DFC (2)	
Robert L. Baseler	USAAF	6	SS	
Hugh N. Batten	USN	7	NC, DFC (2)	
Harold W. Bauer	USMC	11	MOH	MIA 14 November 1942
Aaron L. Bearden	USAAF	5	DFC	POW 3 September 1944
Paul H. N. Beaudry	USN	5	DFC	
Edward H. Beavers Jr.	USAAF	5		KIA 27 November 1944
Paul S. Bechtel	USAAF	5	DFC	5th kill claimed while temporarily assigned to USMC unit
Robert H. Becker	USAAF	7	DFC	
Walter C. Beckham	USAAF	18	DSC, SS (4)	POW 22 February 1944
Marshall U. Beebe	USN	10.5	NC, DFC (3)	"Ace in a day" 18 March 1945
Don M. Beerbower	USAAF	15.5	DSC, SS (2), DFC (3)	KIA 9 August 1944
Duane W. Beeson	USAAF	17.33	DSC, SS	POW 5 April 1944
Louis Benne	USAAF	5	SS	POW 14 June 1944
Joseph H. Bennett	USAAF	8.5	DFC	
Walter G. Benz Jr.	USAAF	8	SS	
Jack S. Berkheimer	USN	7.5	NC	MIA 16 December 1944
Norman R. Berree	USN	9	DFC (4)	
Richard L. Bertelson	USN	5	DFC (2)	
William R. Beyer	USAAF	9	SS	"Ace in a day" 27 September 1944
Carl G. Bickel	USAAF	5.5	SS	
Edward F. Bickford	USAAF	5.5	DFC	
Hipolitus T. Biel	USAAF	5.33	DFC	KIA 24 April 1944
Henry S. Bille	USAAF	6	DFC	
Walter D. Bishop	USN	5	DFC	KIFA 14 December 1944
John T. Blackburn	USN	11	NC, DFC	
Samuel V. Blair	USAAF	11	SS	
William K. Blair	USN	5	DFC	
Donald J. M. Blakeslee	Royal Canadian Air Force, USAAF	14.5	DSC (2), SS (2), DFC (8), UK DFC	
Richard Buckner Blaydes	USN	5	DFC (2)	
Wayne K. Blickenstaff	USAAF	10	DSC, SS	"Ace in a day" 24 March 1945
Laurence E. Blumer	USAAF	6	DSC, SS	"Ace in a day" 25 August 1944
Robert L. Blyth	USN	6.5	DFC (2)	
Donald H. Bochkay	USAAF	13.83	DFC	
Hampton E. Boggs	USAAF	9	DSC, SS	KIFA 1953
Alfred G. Bolduc	USN	5	SS, DFC (2)	
John F. Bolt	USMC	6	DFC (2)	Claimed 6 additional victories and was awarded NC during Korean War. Only Marine to become an ace in two different wars and only Marine ace of Korean War
John W. Bolyard	USAAF	5	DFC	
Charlie R. Bond Jr.	American Volunteer Group	7		
Richard I. Bong	USAAF	40	MOH, DSC, SS (2), DFC (7)	Top American ace in history. KIFA 6 August 1945
William J. Bonneau	USN	8	SS, DFC	KIFA 3 October 1947
Stephen J. Bonner	USAAF	5	DFC	
Robert John Booth	USAAF	8	SS	POW 8 June 1944
Clarence A. Borley	USN	5	NC, DFC (2)	Shot down in October 1944, spending 5 days adrift before rescue
Ernest O. Bostrom	USAAF	5	DFC	
George E. Bostwick	USAAF	8	SS	
Gregory "Pappy" Boyington	American Volunteer Group, USMC	28	MOH, NC	Top Marine ace in history. "Ace in a day" 16 September 1943. POW 3 January 1944
Gerald F. Boyle	USN	5.5	DFC (2)	KIFA October 1944
Jack T. Bradley	USAAF	15	DSC	
John L. Bradley	USAAF	5	SS	
Arthur J. Brassfield	USN	6.33	NC (2)	
Richard L. Braun	USMC	5	DFC (4)	
Charles W. Brewer	USN	6.5	NC, LOM, DFC (3)	"Ace in a day" and MIA 19 June 1944
Michael Brezas	USAAF	12	SS	KIFA 5 February 1954
Johnie J. Bridges	USN	6.25	DFC (3)	
John G. Bright	American Volunteer Group, USAAF	6	SS	First American ace to shoot down Japanese, German, and Italian aircraft. POW August 1943
Mark K. Bright	USN	9	NC	KIA
Joseph E. Broadhead	USAAF	8	DFC	
Samuel J. Brocato Jr.	USN	7	NC, DFC (2)	KIFA 9 June 1960
James L. Brooks	USAAF	13	SS	
Carl A. Brown Jr.	USN	10.5	NC, DFC (2)	"Ace in a day" 24 October 1944
Gerald A. Brown	USAAF	5	DFC (3)	Shot down over France in September 1944, but evaded captivity. Shot down again over Korea and captured as POW 30 November 1950
Harley L. Brown	USAAF	6	DFC	
Harry W. Brown	USAAF	6	SS	Claimed first victory on December 7, 1941, at Pearl Harbor
Henry W. Brown	USAAF	14.2	DSC	POW 3 October 1944
Meade M. Brown	USAAF	6	SS	KIA 24 August 1950
Quince L. Brown	USAAF	12.33	SS	POW and executed 6 September 1944
Robert H. Brown	USAAF	7	SS	
Samuel J. Brown	USAAF	15.5	DSC	
William P. Brown Jr.	USMC	7	NC, DFC (2)	Awarded a second NC during the Korean War. KIA 24 February 1952
James W. Browning	USAAF	7		
Lowell K. Brueland	USAAF	12.5	DSC, SS, DFC	Claimed 2 additional victories during the Korean War
Carland E. Brunmier	USN	6	NC, DFC	
Donald S. Bryan	USAAF	13.33	DSC	"Ace in a day" 2 November 1944
William E. Bryan Jr.	USAAF	7.5		Awarded DSC during Korean War
James A. Bryce	USN	5.25	DFC (2)	KIFA 10 April 1945
Robert L. Buchanan	USN	5	NC, DFC	"Ace in a day" 16 October 1944
George T. Buck Jr.	USAAF	6	SS	
Paul D. Buie	USN	9	NC, SS, DFC (3)	
William Eugene Burckhalter	USN	6	SS (2)	KIA 11 June 1944
Clinton D. Burdick	USAAF	5.5		
George T. Burgard	American Volunteer Group	10		
Franklin N. Burley	USN	7	SS	
Robert L. Burnett III	USAAF	5	DFC	
Roy O. Burnett Jr.	USN	7	DFC	
Howard M. Burriss	USN	7.5	DFC	MIA 31 January 1944
Francis X. Bushner	USN	6	DFC	
Robert L. Buttke	USAAF	5.5	DFC	
Robert J. Byrne	USAAF	6	SS	
Matthew S. Byrnes Jr.	USN	6	DFC (3)	
Robert C. Byrnes	USAAF	5	DFC	
James B. Cain	USN	8.5	SS, DFC (3)	
Raymond L. Callaway	USAAF	6	DFC	
Richard A. Campbell	USAAF	6	DFC	
Richard G. Candelaria	USAAF	6	SS	POW 13 April 1945
John B. Carder	USAAF	7	DFC	POW 12 May 1944, successfully escaped captivity. KIFA 1 October 1961
Raymond C. Care	USAAF	6	DFC	POW 15 April 1944
Henry A. Carey Jr.	USN	7	DFC (2)	
Marion E. Carl	USMC	18.5	NC (2), DFC (3)	
Kendall E. Carlson	USAAF	6	DFC	POW 25 February 1945
William A. Carlton	USMC	5	DFC	
Daniel A. Carmichael	USN	13	SS (2), DFC (5)	
George Carpenter	USAAF	13.84	DFC	POW
Bruce W. Carr	USAAF	15	DSC, SS	"Ace in a day" 2 April 1945
George R. Carr	USN	11.5	NC, DFC (4)	"Ace in a day" 19 June 1944. KIFA 1967
Charles H. Carroll	USN	6	DFC (3)	
Walter J. Carroll	USAAF	7	DFC	
Leonard K. Carson	USAAF	18.5	SS (2)	
James R. Carter	USAAF	6	SS	
William N. Case	USMC	8	DFC (4)	
Nial K. Castle	USAAF	5	DFC (3)	
Dean Caswell	USMC	7	SS (2)	
Charles J. Cesky	USAAF	8.5	DFC	
George F. Ceuleers	USAAF	10.5	DSC	
Henry K. Champion	USN	5	DFC (2)	
Frederic F. Champlin	USAAF	9	DFC	
Creighton Chandler	USMC	6	DFC (2)	
George T. Chandler	USAAF	5	DFC	
Van E. Chandler	USAAF	5	DFC	Claimed 3 more victories during the Korean War
Philip G. Chapman	USAAF	5	DFC	KIA 28 March 1945
Levi R. Chase	USAAF	12	DFC (4)	
Leonard J. Check	USN	12	NC, SS, LOM, DFC (2)	KIFA January 1945
Oscar I. Chenoweth	USN	8.5	SS, DFC	
Lewis W. Chick Jr.	USAAF	6		
Arthur Chin	Canton Provincial Air Force	8.5	DFC	Born in Oregon, first American ace of war
Frederick J. Christensen	USAAF	21.5	SS	"Ace in a day" 7 July 1944
James A. Clark	USAAF	10.5	SS	
Lawrence A. Clark	USN	7	NC, DFC (4)	
Robert A. Clark	USN	6	DFC (3)	
Walter E. Clarke	USN	7	DFC (5)	
Arthur B. Cleaveland	USAAF	5	SS	"Ace in a day" 18 April 1943
Donald C. Clements	USN	5	DFC (3)	
Robert E. Clements	USN	5	DFC (2)	
Dallas A. Clinger Jr.	USAAF	5	DFC	
Vivian A. Cloud	USAAF	5	DFC	
Robert C. Coats Jr.	USN	9.33	NC, DFC (2)	"Ace in a day" 18 March 1945
Paul R. Cochran	USAAF	5	DFC	
Oscar H. Coen	Royal Air Force, USAAF	5.5	DFC(UK), SS	Shot down over France and smuggled to Spain while with RAF
Robert L. Coffey	USAAF	6	DFC	KIFA 20 April 1949 while serving as a Congressman from Pennsylvania
Thaddeus T. Coleman	USN	10	NC, SS, DFC (3)	
Wilson M. Coleman	USN	6	DFC (3)	
Frank J. Collins	USAAF	9	SS	POW 12 July 1945
William M. Collins	USN	9	NC, DFC (4)	
J. D. Collinsworth	USAAF	6	DFC	
Philip E. Colman Jr.	USAAF	6	DFC	Claimed 4 additional victories during the Korean War
Gordon B. Compton	USAAF	5.5		
Harold E. "Bunny" Comstock	USAAF	5	DFC	
Arthur R. Conant	USMC	6	DFC (5)	
Edwin S. Conant	USN	~5		
Henry L. Condon II	USAAF	5	DFC	KIA January 1945
Jack E. Conger	USMC	10	NC, DFC (2)	
Paul A. Conger	USAAF	11.5	DSC	
Thomas J. Conroy	USN	7	NC	"Ace in a day" 24 October 1944
Walter V. Cook	USAAF	6	DFC	
Merle M. Coons	USAAF	5		
William E. Copeland	USN	6	SS	
Paul Cordray	USN	7	DFC (2)	
Richard L. Cormier	USN	8	SS, DFC (5)	
Leland B. Cornell	USN	~5		
Richard D. Cowger	USN	6	DFC (3)	
Ralph L. Cox	USAAF	5	SS	
Melvin Cozzens	USN	6.5	DFC	
Edward "Porky" Cragg	USAAF	15	DSC	MIA 26 December 1943
Clement M. Craig	USN	11.75	NC (2), DFC	"Ace in a day" 21 January 1945
Darrell S. Cramer	USAAF	7		
Niven K. Cranfill	USAAF	5	SS (2)	
Ray Crawford	USAAF	6	DFC	
Claude J. Crenshaw	USAAF	7	DSC	
Harry C. Crim	USAAF	6	SS	
William F. Crombie	USAAF	5		
Donald F. Cronin	USN	6	DFC	
John T. Crosby	USN	5.25	NC, DFC (2)	"Ace in a day" 16 April 1945
William E. Crowe	USMC	7	NC, DFC (5)	KIFA 1 April 1960
Arthur W. Cruikshank	USAAF	8		
William J. Cullerton	USAAF	5	DSC, SS	POW 5 April 1945
Donald M. Cummings	USAAF	6.5	DFC	
Arthur C. Cundy	USAAF	6	DFC	MIA 11 March 1945
Daniel G. Cunningham	USN	7	NC, DFC	
James N. Cupp	USMC	13	NC, DFC (3)	
Louis E. Curdes	USAAF	9	DFC (2)	POW 27 August 1943, escaped captivity April 1944
John H. Curry	Royal Canadian Air Force	7.33	DFC(UK)	Born in Texas
Robert C. Curtis	USAAF	14	DSC, SS, DFC (2)	
Warren D. Curton	USAAF	5	DFC	
Frank A. Cutler	USAAF	7.5	SS (2)	KIA 13 May 1944
Edward J. Czarnecki	USAAF	6	SS	Shot down 23 October 1943, evaded capture and was rescued in February 1944
Perry J. Dahl	USAAF	9	SS	
Kenneth H. Dahlberg	USAAF	14	DSC, SS, DFC (2)	POW 14 February 1945
Kenneth J. Dahms	USN	7	NC, DFC	"Ace in a day" 6 April 1945
James B. Dalglish	USAAF	9	SS	
Fernley H. Damstrom	USAAF	8	SS	KIFA 11 April 1945
William A. Daniel	USAAF	5	SS	
Jack S. Daniell	USAAF	5	DSC	"Ace in a day" 26 November 1944
Merl W. Davenport	USN	6.25	DFC (2)	
George H. Davidson	USN	5.5	DFC	
Clarence E. Davies	USN	5	SS, DFC (3)	
Barrie S. Davis	USAAF	6	SS	
Clayton E. Davis	USAAF	5	DSC	
George A. Davis Jr.	USAAF	7	SS, DFC (2)	Claimed 14 additional victories and was awarded the MOH and DSC during the Korean War. KIA 10 February 1952
Glendon V. Davis	USAAF	7.5		Evaded capture in France for 4 months before he was smuggled back to England
Leonard K. Davis	USMC	5	NC, DFC	
Ralph H. Davis	USN	7.5		
Robert H. Davis	USN	5.5	DFC (2)	
George E. Dawkins Jr.	USMC	5		
William C. Day Jr.	USAAF	5	DFC	
Gregory A. Daymond	Royal Air Force	5+	DFC(UK)	
Richard S. Deakins	USAAF	6	DFC	KIFA November 1944
Cecil O. Dean	USAAF	6	DFC	POW 2 July 1944
William A. Dean Jr.	USN	11	NC, DFC (5)	
Zach W. Dean	USAAF	7	SS	POW 21 April 1951
John W. Dear Jr.	USN	7	SS, DFC (2)	
Jefferson J. DeBlanc	USMC	9	MOH, DFC	"Ace in a day" 31 January 1943
Leslie Decew	USN	6	DFC (2)	
Edwin L. Degraffenreid	USAAF	6	SS	
Robert M. DeHaven	USAAF	14	SS	
George Della	USAAF	5	DFC	
Phillip C. DeLong	USMC	11.66	DFC (4)	Claimed 2 additional victories during the Korean War
Anthony J. Denman	USN	6	DFC (2)	
Reuben H. Denoff	USN	5	SS, DFC	
Elliott E. Dent Jr.	USAAF	6	DSC	
Richard O. Devine	USN	8	SS, DFC (4)	
Lawrence A. Dewing	USN	5.5	DFC (2)	
Robert A. M. Dibb	USN	7	NC, DFC (2)	KIFA 29 August 1944
Frederick E. Dick	USAAF	5	DFC	
Michael Dikovitsky	USAAF	5	DFC	
Joseph V. Dillard	USMC	6.3	DFC	
William J. Dillard	USAAF	6	SS	
Eugene Dillow	USMC	6	DFC	
John F. Dobbin	USMC	8	NC, DFC	
George A. Doersch	USAAF	10.5	SS, DFC (3)	
Archie G. Donahue	USMC	14	NC, DFC (3)	"Ace in a day" 12 April 1945
I.B. Donalson	USAAF	5	DSC	
Landis E. Doner	USN	8	DFC (3)	
Harry W. Dorris	USAAF	5	SS	
Jefferson D. Dorroh	USMC	6	NC, DFC	"Ace in a day" 22 April 1945
Frederick J. Dorsch Jr.	USAAF	8.5	SS	
Paul P. Douglas Jr.	USAAF	8	DSC (2)	
Cecil J. Doyle	USMC	5	NC	MIA 7 November 1943
Charles W. Drake	USMC	5	NC, DFC	
Irwin H. Dregne	USAAF	5	DSC	
Urban L. Drew	USAAF	6	Air Force Cross, DFC (2)	First pilot to shoot down 2 jet aircraft
William C. Drier	USAAF	6	DSC	
Daniel B. J. Driscoll	USN	5	DFC	
Frank C. Drury	USMC	6	NC, DFC	
Paul E. Drury	USN	6.5	DFC (2)	
Francis E. Dubisher	USAAF	5	DSC	
Charles H. DuBois	USAAF	6		
James E. Duffy Jr.	USAAF	5.5	DFC	
James E. Duffy Jr.	USN	5		
Richard E. Duffy	USAAF	5	SS	"Ace in a day" 18 April 1943
Walter F. Duke	USAAF	10	SS	MIA 6 June 1944
John S. Dunaway	USAAF	7	DSC	MIA 22 November 1944
George Chamberlain Duncan	USN	13.5	NC, SS, DFC (6)	
Glenn E. Duncan	USAAF	19.5	DSC, SS	Shot down in July 1944, evaded capture and joined the Dutch underground
Robert W. Duncan	USN	7	NC, DFC (2)	
Fred L. Dungan	USN	7	NC, DFC	
William D. Dunham	USAAF	16	DSC	
Richard W. Dunkin	USAAF	9	SS	
Bernard Dunn	USN	5.33	DFC (2)	
William R. "Poppy" Dunn	British Royal Air Force, USAAF	6		Serving in the RAF, he became the first American ace of World War II
Parker Dupouy	American Volunteer Group, USAAF	6.5		
Dewey F. Durnford	USMC	6.5	DFC (3)	
Glenn T. Eagleston	USAAF	18.5	DSC, SS	Top ace in the 9th Air Force, claimed 2 additional victories during the Korean War
Hoyt A. Eason	USAAF	6	SS	MIA 3 March 1943
Clyde B. East	USAAF	13	SS	
David B. Eastham	USAAF	12		
Richard T. Eastmond	USN	9	NC, DFC	
Byron A. Eberts	USN	6	DFC (2)	
William G. Eccles	USN	~5		
Bert Eckard	USN	7	NC, DFC (2)	"Ace in a day" 11 May 1945
Billy C. Edens	USAAF	7	SS	POW 10 September 1944
Willard E. Eder	USN	6.5	NC, DFC (2)	
Selden R. Edner	Royal Air Force	5		
Edward B. Edwards Jr.	USAAF	5.5	SS	
William C. Edwards Jr.	USN	7.5	NC, DFC (2)	"Ace in a day" 16 February 1945
Joseph L. Egan Jr.	USAAF	5	DFC	KIA 17 July 1944
Robert A. Elder	USAAF	5	SS, DFC	"Ace in a day" 24 March 1945
Ralph E. Elliott	USN	9.5	DFC (3)	
Vincent T. Elliott	USAAF	7	SS	
Hugh M. Elwood	USMC	5	DFC	
Donald R. Emerson	USAAF	7	DFC	KIA 25 December 1944
Warren S. Emerson	USAAF	6	SS	
Wallace N. Emmer	USAAF	14	DSC, SS	POW 9 August 1944, died in captivity February 1945
Benjamin H. Emmert Jr.	USAAF	7	SS	POW 1 September 1944. Claimed 1 additional victory during the Korean War
Eugene H. Emmons	USAAF	9	DFC	
James W. Empey	USAAF	5	SS	
James J. England	USAAF	10		
John B. England	USAAF	17.5	SS	KIFA 17 November 1954
Anthony J. Enman	USN	~5		
Lyle A. Erickson	USN	~5		
Andrew J. Evans	USAAF	8	DFC	POW 27 March 1953
Roy W. Evans	USAAF	6	SS	POW 14 February 1945
Eric A. Evenson	USN	8.25	DFC (3)	
Lee R. Everhart	USAAF	6	DFC	MIA 12 October 1944
Loren D. Everton	USMC	12	NC, DFC	
John W. Fair	USN	5	SS, DFC	
David C. "Foob" Fairbanks	Royal Canadian Air Force	12.5 or 13.5	DFC(UK)	Born in New York
Grover E. Fanning	USAAF	9	SS	
Charles D. Farmer	USN	7.25	NC, DFC (2)	
Robert A. Farnsworth	USN	5	DFC (2)	
William Farrell	USMC	5	NC, DFC	
Robert P. Fash	USN	6	NC, DFC (3)	
Richard D. Faxon	USAAF	5	SS	
Alfred J. Fecke	USN	7	NC, DFC	"Ace in a day" 16 October 1944
Edward L. Feightner	USN	9	DFC (4)	
Sylvan Feld	USSAF	9	SS	POW 13 August 1944, died in captivity 21 August 1944
Marion C. Felts	USSAF	5	DFC	KIFA 27 February 1963
Leopold M. Ferko	USN	5	DFC (2)	
James E. Fenex Jr.	USAAF	5	DFC	
Ernest C. Fiebelkorn	USAAF	9	SS (2)	KIA 6 July 1950
Arthur C. Fiedler Jr.	USAAF	8	SS	
William F. Fiedler Jr.	USAAF	5	DFC	Only P-39 ace in USAAF, KIFA 30 June 1943
Virgil C. Fields Jr.	USAAF	6	DSC	KIA 2 February 1944
Howard J. Finn	USMC	6	DFC (5)	
Charles R. Fischette	USAAF	5	DFC	
Don H. Fisher	USMC	6	DFC	
Edwin O. Fisher	USAAF	7	SS	KIFA 28 March 1947
Rodney W. Fisher	USAAF	5	DFC	
Harry E. Fisk	USAAF	5	SS	POW 13 January 1945
Jack A. Fisk	USAAF	7	DFC	
Nelson D. Flack Jr.	USAAF	5	DFC	
James H. Flatley	USN	6	NC, LOM, DFC (3)	
Richard H. Fleischer	USAAF	6	DFC	
Francis M. Fleming	USN	7.5	SS, DFC (2)	
Patrick D. Fleming	USN	19	NC, SS (2), DFC (3)	"Ace in a day" 16 February 1945. KIFA 1956
Kenneth A. Flinn	USN	5	DFC	POW 13 October 1944, died in captivity 24 July 1945
Frank E. Foltz	USN	~5	NC	
Ralph E. Foltz	USN	5	DFC (2)	
Paul J. Fontana	USMC	5	NC, DFC	
Kenneth M. Ford	USMC	5	DFC	
George Formanek Jr.	USN	5	DFC (2)	KIA 23 April 1944
Samuel W. Forrer	USN	~5	NC, DFC	
Joseph M. Forster	USAAF	9	SS	
Norman J. Fortier	USAAF	5.83	DFC	
Joseph J. Foss	USMC	26	MOH, DFC	First Marine "Ace in a day" 25 October 1942. Second highest scoring Marine ace of the war, later served as Governor of South Dakota
Carl C. Foster	USN	8.5	NC, DFC	"Ace in a day" 6 April 1945
William B. Foulis Jr.	USAAF	6	SS	
James M. Fowle	USAAF	8	SS	
Richard E. Fowler Jr.	USN	6.5	NC, SS, DFC (3)	
Robert W. Foy	USAAF	15	SS	KIFA 25 March 1950
Marvin J. Franger	USN	9	SS, DFC (5)	
Dwaine R. Franklin	USAAF	7	SS	
John M. Franks	USN	7	DFC (3)	
Carl M. Frantz	USAAF	11	SS	
Robert B. Fraser	USMC	6	DFC (2)	KIFA 18 June 1945
Kenneth D. Frazier	USMC	12.5	NC, DFC (2)	
Doris C. Freeman	USN	9	DFC (4)	KIA 11 May 1945
William B. Freeman	USMC	6	DFC	
James B. French	USN	11	SS, DFC (3)	
Alfred L. Frendberg	USN	6	SS, DFC (2)	
Alfred C. Froning	USAAF	6	SS	
Earl R. Fryer	USAAF	7		
Harold N. Funk	USN	6.5	NC, DFC (2)	"Ace in a day" 24 October 1944
Francis S. "Gabby" Gabreski	USAAF	28	DSC, SS (2), DFC (10)	Highest scoring American ace in Europe. POW 25 July 1944. Claimed 6.5 additional victories during the Korean War
Franklin T. Gabriel	USN	8	DFC	
Frank L. Gailer Jr.	USAAF	5.5	DFC	POW 27 November 1944
Robert E. Galer	USMC	13	MOH, DFC	
Charles S. Gallup	USAAF	6	SS	
Kenneth W. Gallup	USAAF	9	SS	
Dwight B. Galt	USN	5	DFC (2)	
John R. Galvin	USN	7	DFC (4)	
Warner F. Gardner	USAAF	5	DFC	
William A. Gardner	USAAF	8	SS	
Vermont Garrison	USAAF	7.33	SS, DFC (2)	POW 3 March 1944. Claimed 10 additional victories and was awarded the DSC during the Korean War
Frank L. Gaunt	USAAF	8	SS	
Noel A. M. Gayler	USN	5	NC (3)	
Dominic S. "Don" Gentile	Royal Canadian Air Force, USAAF	21.83	DSC (2), SS, DFC (8)	
Francis R. Gerard	USAAF	8	SS	
Steven Gerick	USAAF	5	DFC	
Grover D. Gholson	USAAF	5	SS	
Robert D. Gibb	USAAF	5	DFC (3)	MIA 16 December 1951
John T. Gildea	USN	7	SS, DFC (5)	KIA 11 May 1945
Clement D. Gile	USN	8	DFC (4)	
Roy F. Gillespie	USN	6	SS, DFC (3)	
Edward L. Gimbel	Royal Canadian Air Force	5	DFC(UK)	
William K. Giroux	USAAF	10	SS	
Cyrus R. Gladen	USAAF	5	SS	
Michael Gladych	Royal Air Force, USAAF	17		
George W. Gleason	USAAF	12	DFC	
Maxwell H. Glenn	USAAF	7.5	SS	
Fred W. Glover	USAAF	10.33		
John T. Godfrey	USAAF	16.33	SS (2), DFC (8)	POW 24 August 1944, escaped captivity
Lindley W. Godson	USN	5	SS, DFC (2)	
Robert J. Goebel	USAAF	11	SS	
Walter J. Goehausen Jr.	USAAF	10	DFC	
Robert E. Goodnight	USAAF	7.25	SS	
James A. Goodson	USAAF	15	DSC, SS, DFC (UK), DFC (9)	POW 20 June 1944
Donald "Flash" Gordon	USN	7	DFC (3)	
Edmond R. Goss	USAAF	6	DFC	
Norman D. Gould	USAAF	5		
Gordon M. Graham	USAAF	7	SS	
Lindol F. Graham	USAAF	5.5	DFC	
Robert F. Graham	USAAF	5	SS	
Vernon E. Graham	USN	5	NC	
Marvin E. Grant	USAAF	7	SS	
James S. Gray	USN	6	DFC (5)	
John F. Gray	USN	8.25	NC, DFC	KIFA 3 June 1946
Lester E. Gray	USN	5.25	DFC (2)	
Rockford V. Gray	USAAF	6.5	DFC	KIFA 4 September 1944
Herschel H. "Herky" Green	USAAF	18	DSC, SS, DFC (2)	"Ace in a day" 30 January 1944
Lee O. Gregg	USAAF	7	DFC	
Hayden A. Gregory	USN	5	SS, DFC (4)	
Billy M. Gresham	USAAF	6	DFC	KIA 2 October 1944
Joseph H. Griffin	USAAF	7	SS	
Richard J. Griffin	USN	8	DFC (3)	
Robert C. Griffith	USAAF	5	DFC	KIA 24 July 1944
Clayton Kelly Gross	USAAF	6	SS	
LeRoy V. Grosshuesch	USAAF	8	SS	
William Grosvenor Jr.	USAAF	5	SS	
Charles F. Gumm	USAAF	6	SS	KIA 1 March 1944
Cheatham W. Gupton	USAAF	5	DFC	
Harlan I. Gustafson	USN	6	DFC	
Fred E. Gutt	USMC	8	DFC (2)	
Walter A. Haas	USN	~5	NC (2)	
Roger A. Haberman	USMC	7	NC	
Albert E. Hacking Jr.	USMC	5	DFC	
Mayo A. Hadden Jr.	USN	8	SS, DFC (3)	
James P. Hagerstrom	USAAF	6	DSC, DFC	Claimed another 8.5 victories during the Korean War
George F. Hall	USAAF	6	DFC	
Sheldon O. Hall	USMC	6		
William T. Halton	USAAF	10.5	SS	Awarded DSC in Korean War. MIA 21 May 1952
Louis R. Hamblin	USN	6.5	DFC (2)	
Henry B. Hamilton	USMC	7	NC, DFC	MIA 21 October 1942
Robert M. Hamilton	USN	6	DFC (3)	
Samuel E. Hammer	USAAF	5	SS	
John F. Hampshire	USAAF	13	DFC	DOW 2 May 1943
William F. Hanes Jr.	USAAF	6	SS	
Eugene R. Hanks	USN	6	NC, DFC (3)	
Harry T. Hanna	USAAF	5	DFC	"Ace in a day" 9 October 1943
Chris J. Hanseman	USAAF	5	DFC	KIA
Herman Hansen Jr.	USMC	5.5	NC, SS (2), DFC (2)	
Robert M. Hanson	USMC	25	MOH, NC	"Ace in a day" 14 January 1944. KIA 3 February 1944
Willis E. Hardy	USN	6.5	NC, DFC	
Everett C. Hargreaves	USN	8.5	SS, DFC (3)	
Walter R. Harman	USN	5	DFC (2)	
Raymond F. Harmeyer	USAAF	6	SS	
Archibald A. Harrington	USAAF	7		
Bill Harris	USAAF	16	DFC	
Cecil E. Harris	USN	24	NC, SS (2), DFC (3)	
Ernest A. Harris	USAAF	10	SS	KIFA 1949
Frederick A. Harris	USAAF	8	SS	KIFA 31 October 1943
Leroy E. Harris	USN	9.25	SS, DFC (4)	
Thomas L. Harris	USAAF	5	DFC	POW 27 May 1944
Thomas S. Harris	USN	9	DFC (6)	
Cameron M. Hart	USAAF	6	DFC	KIFA 1946
Kenneth F. Hart	USAAF	8	SS	
Raymond E. Hartley Jr.	USAAF	5	DFC	
Paul R. Hatala	USAAF	5.5	DFC	
Herbert B. Hatch	USAAF	5	DSC	"Ace in a day" 10 June 1944
Charles D. Hauver	USAAF	5	DFC	
Charles H. Haverland Jr.	USN	6.5	SS, DFC (4)	
Fred R. Haviland Jr.	USAAF	6	DFC	
Arthur R. Hawkins	USN	14	NC (3), DFC (3)	"Ace in a day" 13 September 1944
Russell C. Haworth	USAAF	5	DFC	
Frank R. Hayde	USN	6	DFC	MIA 16 July 1944
Thomas L. Hayes Jr.	USAAF	8.5	SS	
Thomas C. Haywood	American Volunteer Group	5.25		
Cotesworth B. Head Jr.	USAAF	14	DFC	MIA 18 January 1943
Frank C. Hearrell	USN	5	DFC (2)	
Horace W. Heath	USN	7	DFC (2)	KIFA 8 July 1945
Robert Hedman	American Volunteer Group	6		
Roger R. Hedrick	USN	12	SS, DFC (4)	
Lloyd P. Heinzen	USN	6	DFC (2)	KIFA 11 November 1945
Edwin L. Heller	USAAF	5.5	DSC, SS, DFC (5)	Claimed an additional 3.5 victories during the Korean War. POW 23 January 1953
Paul M. Henderson Jr.	USN	5	SS	KIA 15 June 1944
Randall W. Hendricks	USAAF	5	DSC	
William J. Hennon	USAAF	7	SS	KIFA 1953
William E. Henry	USN	9.5	NC, DFC (3)	
John C. "Pappy" Herbst	USAAF	18	SS	KIFA 4 July 1946
Edwin J. Hernan Jr.	USMC	8	DFC (3)	MIA 19 July 1951
Samuel B. Hibbard	USN	7.33	DFC (3)	
Allen E. Hill	USAAF	9	SS	
David L. "Tex" Hill	American Volunteer Group, USAAF	18.75	DSC	
Frank A. Hill	USAAF	7	SS	
Harry E. Hill	USN	7	DFC (2)	
James E. Hill	USAAF	5	DSC	
Donald E. Hillman	USAAF	5	SS (2), DFC	POW October 1944
Hollis H. Hills	Royal Canadian Air Force, USN	5	SS, DFC	
Kenneth G. Hippe	USN	5	NC, DFC	"Ace in a day" 24 October 1944
Edwin W. Hiro	USAAF	5	DFC	MIA 19 September 1944
Howard D. Hively	USAAF	12	DSC	
Myron M. Hnatio	USAAF	5	DFC	
John B. Hoag	USN	5	DFC (3)	
John J. Hockery	USAAF	7	DFC	POW 26 November 1944. Claimed 1 additional victory during the Korean War
William R. Hodges	USAAF	5	DFC	
John H. Hoefker	USAAF	8.5	SS	
Ronald W. Hoel	USN	5	DFC (3)	
Ralph K. Hofer	USAAF	15	DFC (7)	KIA 2 July 1944
Cullen J. Hoffman	USAAF	5	DFC	
James E. Hoffman Jr.	USAAF	6.5	SS	MIA 22 August 1944
Roy B. Hogg	USAAF	6	SS	
Bruce K. Holloway	USAAF	13		
James D. Holloway	USAAF	6	DFC	MIA 2 May 1945
George L. Hollowell	USMC	8	DFC (6)	
Besby F. Holmes	USAAF		NC	
Cyril F. Homer	USAAF	15	DSC, SS	
William L. Hood	USMC	5	DFC (2)	
Wallace E. Hopkins	USAAF	5	DFC	
Francis W. Horne	USAAF	5.5	DFC (4)	
Herbert N. Houck	USN	6	NC (3), DFC (4)	
William J. Hovde	USAAF	10.5	DSC, SS	"Ace in a day" 5 December 1944. Claimed 1 additional victory during the Korean War
James H. Howard	American Volunteer Group, USAAF	8.33	MOH, DFC	
Robert L. Howard	USAAF	6	SS	
David W. Howe	USAAF	6	DFC	
Bernard H. Howes	USAAF	6	DFC	POW 3 March 1945
Edward R. Hoyt	USAAF	5	DFC	Penultimate ace of the war
Mark E. Hubbard	USAAF	6.5	SS	POW 18 March 1944
Howard R. Hudson	USN	5	SS, DFC (3)	
Charles W. Huffman	USN	7	DFC (2)	
Robert J. Humphrey	USN	5.33	DFC (2)	KIA in Korea
John C. Hundley	USMC	6	DFC (3)	
Alvaro J. Hunter	USAAF	5	DFC	
Edward E. Hunt	USAAF	6.5	DFC	KIA 8 November 1944
Richard F. Hurd	USAAF	6	DFC	Last and highest scoring American Spitfire ace
Frank D. Hurlbut	USAAF	9	DFC	
Robert Hurst	USN	6	DFC (3)	
Joe W. Icard	USAAF	5	DFC	KIA 8 March 1944
Jack M. Ilfrey	USAAF	7.5	SS	MIA 13 June 1944, evaded captivity and returned to his unit
James C. Ince	USAAF	6	SS	
Julius W. Ireland	USMC	5.5	DFC (3)	
Clayton M. Isaacson	USAAF	5		
Michael J. Jackson	USAAF	8	SS	
Willie O. Jackson Jr.	USAAF	7	SS	
Gilbert L. Jamison	USAAF	7	SS	
Bruce Donald Jaques	USN	5.5	SS, DFC (2)	
Arthur F. Jeffrey	USAAF	14	SS	
Otto D. Jenkins	USAAF	8.5	SS	KIFA 24 March 1945
Robert H. Jennings Jr.	USN	9.5	NC, SS, DFC (3)	KIFA 30 June 1954
Alvin J. Jensen	USMC	7	NC, DFC (4)	KIFA 20 May 1949
Hayden M. Jensen	USN	5	NC (2), DFC	
Verl E. Jett	USAAF	7	SS	
Arthur G. Johnson Jr.	USAAF	8.5	SS	
Byron M. Johnson	USN	8	DFC (3)	
Clarence O. Johnson	USAAF	7	SS	KIA 23 September 1944
Evan M. Johnson V	USAAF	5	DFC	
Gerald R. Johnson	USAAF	22	DSC (2), SS, LOM	KIFA 7 October 1945
Gerald W. Johnson	USAAF	16.5	DSC	POW 27 March 1944
James K. Johnson	USAAF	1		Claimed 10 additional victories during the Korean War
Robert S. Johnson	USAAF	27	DSC	
Wallace R. Johnson	USN	5	DFC (2)	
John M. Johnston	USN	8	SS, DFC (4)	
Robert D. Johnston	USAAF	6	DSC	
Charles D. Jones	USMC	6	SS, DFC (3)	KIFA 5 March 1965
Curran L. Jones	USAAF	5	SS	
Cyril W. Jones Jr.	USAAF	6	DSC	MIA 12 September 1944
Frank Cazenove Jones	USAAF	5		
James M. Jones	USN	7	SS, DFC (3)	
John L. Jones	USAAF	8	SS	
Lynn F. Jones	USAAF	5	DFC	
Ripley O. Jones	Royal Air Force	7.7		Born in New York
Warren L. Jones	USAAF	5	DFC	
Wallace R. Jordan	USAAF	6	SS	
Alwin M. Juchheim	USAAF	9	DSC	POW 28 May 1944
William H. Julian	USAAF	5	DFC	
Joseph Kaelin	USN	5	NC, DFC (2)	
William R. Kane	USN	6	NC, DFC (2)	KIFA 5 February 1957
Dale E. Karger	USAAF	7.5	DFC	3rd youngest ace of the war at 19 years old
Robert A. Karr	USAAF	6	SS	
Neel E. Kearby	USAAF	22	MOH, SS (2), DFC (4)	"Ace in a day" 11 October 1943. KIA 5 March 1944
Robert J. Keen	USAAF	7	DSC	
LeRoy W. Keith	USN	5.5	NC, DFC (2)	"Ace in a day" 16 April 1945
William T. Kemp	USAAF	6	DSC	
Charles Kendrick	USMC	5	DFC	KIA 2 October 1942
Daniel Kennedy	USAAF	5	DFC	
Ira C. Kepford	USN	16	NC (2), SS, DFC	
Leslie H. Kerr Jr.	USN	~5		
Robert R. Kidwell Jr.	USN	5	DFC (4)	
Donald D. Kienholz	USAAF	6	DFC	KIFA 1973
John R. Kincaid	USN	5		
Robert A. Kincaid	USN	5	NC, SS, DFC (2)	
Benjamin H. King	USAAF	7	SS, DFC (2)	
Charles W. King	USAAF	5	SS	
David L. King	USAAF	5	DFC	
William B. King	USAAF	5.5	SS	
William J. Kingston Jr.	USN	6	DFC (3)	
Claiborne H. Kinnard Jr.	USAAF	8	DSC	
James J. Kinsella	USN	5	DFC (3)	
Claude R. Kinsey	USAAF	7	DFC	POW 4 April 1943, escaped captivity October 1943
Marion F. Kirby	USAAF	5	SS	
George N. Kirk	USN	7	DFC (2)	
Lenton F. Kirkland Jr.	USAAF	5	SS	MIA 25 December 1944
Floyd C. Kirkpatrick	USMC	5.5	DFC (3)	
Phillip L. Kirkwood	USN	12	NC, DFC	
John A. Kirla	USAAF	11.5	SS	
George E. Kiser	USAAF	9	DSC, SS	
Frank W. Klibbe	USAAF	7		
Robert H. Knapp	USAAF	5	DFC (3)	
William M. Knight	USN	7.5	SS, DFC (2)	MIA 5 November 1944
Carroll S. Knott	USAAF	5	DFC	
Charles W. Koenig	USAAF	6.5	DSC	
Edward H. Kopsel	USAAF	5		
Walter J. Koraleski Jr.	USAAF	5.53		
William J. Kostik	USN	5	SS, DFC	
Joseph J. Kruzel	USAAF	6	SS (3)	
Henry B. Kucheman Jr.	USAAF	6		
Ward A. Kuentzel	USAAF	7	DFC	KIFA 19 June 1944
Charles M. Kunz	USMC	8	NC, DFC (3)	
Kenneth G. Ladd	USAAF	12	SS	
Dean S. Laird	USN	5.75	DFC	Only Navy ace to shoot down German and Japanese planes
Wayne W. Laird	USMC	5	DFC	KIFA 30 April 1943. Only Marine Corps ace to shoot down German and Japanese planes
Kenneth B. Lake	USN	6	DFC	
George M. Lamb	USAAF	7.5	SS (2)	
Robert A. Lamb	USAAF	7	SS	
William E. Lamb	USN	5	NC	Claimed 1 additional victory during the Korean War
William E. Lamoreaux	USN	5	DFC	
Richard C. Lampe	USAAF	5.5	DFC	
John D. Landers	USAAF	14.5	SS (3)	
John H. Lane	USAAF	6	SS	
Willis G. Laney	USN	5	SS, DFC (6)	
Joseph L. Lang	USAAF	7.83	DFC	KIA 14 October 1944
Ned W. Langdon	USN	5	NC, DFC (3)	
Thomas G. Lanphier	USAAF	5.5	NC, SS (2)	
Donald A. Larson	USAAF	6	SS, DFC (2)	KIFA 4 August 1944
Leland A. Larson	USAAF	6	DFC	
Charles W. Lasko	USAAF	7.5	SS	
Franklin C. Lathrope	USAAF	5		
Charles H. Laughlin	American Volunteer Group	5		
John B. Lawler	USAAF	11	SS	
Frank L. Lawlor	American Volunteer Group, USN	9	DFC (3)	
Earl R. Lazear Jr.	USAAF	5	SS	
Richard J. Lee	USAAF	5	SS	
Marlow J. Leikness	USAAF	5	DFC	
Charles W. Lenfest	USAAF	5.5		POW 3 October 1944
Jack Lenox Jr.	USAAF	5	SS	
Francis J. Lent	USAAF	11	SS (2)	KIFA 1 December 1944
William N. Leonard	USN	6	NC (2), DFC	
John A. Leppla	USN	5	NC (2)	MIA 26 October 1942
Alfred Lerch	USN	7	NC	"Ace in a day" 16 April 1945
Joseph J. Lesicka	USAAF	9	DFC	"Ace in a day" 15 July 1943
William L. Leverette	USAAF	11	DSC	"Ace in a day" 9 October 1943
Warren R. Lewis	USAAF	7	DFC	
William H. Lewis	USAAF	7	DFC	"Ace in a day" 5 September 1944
Lawrence P. Liebers	USAAF	7	DFC	KIFA 1946
Robert L. Liles	USAAF	5	SS	
Hugh D. Lillie	USN	5		
Elvin L. Lindsay	USN	8	NC, SS (2), DFC	
Ted E. Lines	USAAF	10	DSC	
Raymond H. Littge	USAAF	10.5	DSC	KIFA 20 May 1949
James W. Little	USAAF	7		Claimed 1 additional victory during the Korean War
Robert L. Little	American Volunteer Group	10		
Gregory. K. Loesch	USMC	8.5	NC, DFC	KIFA 27 September 1943
John S. Loisel	USAAF	11	SS	
John D. Lombard	USAAF	7	SS	KIA 30 June 1943
Charles P. London	USAAF	5	DSC	First USAAF ace in European Theater
Herbert H. Long	USAAF	10	DFC (7)	
Maurice G. Long	USAAF	5.5	SS	
Donald S. Lopez	USAAF	5	SS	
Clifford Louie				
George G. Loving Jr.	USAAF	5		
John H. Lowell	USAAF	7.5	SS (2)	
Wayne L. Lowry	USAAF	11	SS	POW 7 October 1944
Marvin W. Lubner	USAAF	6	DFC	
Paul W. Lucas	USAAF	6	DFC	KIA January 1945
Carl J. Luksic	USAAF	8.5	DSC, DFC (4)	"Ace in a day" 8 May 1944
James F. Luma	Royal Canadian Air Force, USAAF	5	DFC	
Walter A. Lundin	USN	6.5	DFC	
William M. Lundin	USMC	5.5		
Stanley J. Lustic	USAAF	6	DFC	
Lowell C. Lutton	USAAF	5	SS	MIA 2 November 1943
Joseph P. Lynch	USMC	5.5	DFC (2)	
John J. Lynch	Royal Air Force	13	DFC(UK) & Bar	Born in California
Thomas J. Lynch	USAAF	20	DSC	KIA 8 March 1944
John B. Maas Jr.	USMC	5.5	DFC (2)	
Lewin A. Maberry	USN	5	DFC (2)	
Charles H. "Mac" MacDonald	USAAF	27	DSC (2), SS (2)	
John A. MacKay	USAAF	6	DFC	
Christopher L. Magee	USMC	9	NC	
Morton D. Magoffin	USAAF	5	DSC, SS, DFC	POW 10 August 1944
William J. Maguire	USAAF	7	SS	KIFA 11 August 1945
Jackson Barrett Mahon	Royal Air Force	5		Born in California. POW 19 August 1942
Keith Mahon	USAAF	5	DFC	
Grant M. Mahony	USAAF	5	DSC, SS	
Walker M. "Bud" Mahurin	USAAF	21	DSC, DFC (5)	Claimed 3.5 additional victories during the Korean War. POW 13 May 1952
Charles M. Mallory	USN	10	DFC	
Thomas E. Maloney	USAAF	8	DFC	
Jack C. Mankin	USAAF	5	SS	
Lee P. Mankin jr.	USN	5	DFC	Only enlisted American to become an ace
Thomas H. Mann Jr.	USMC	10	NC	
Armand G. Manson	USN	7	DFC (5)	
Harry A. March Jr.	USN	5		
Gene E. Markham	USAAF	5	DFC	
William P. Marontate	USMC	13	NC	MIA 15 January 1943
Lester C. Marsh	USAAF	5	SS	
Bert W. Marshall Jr.	USAAF	7	SS	
Albert E. Martin Jr.	USN	5	NC	
Kenneth R. Martin	USAAF	5	DSC	POW 11 February 1944
Joe L. Mason	USAAF	5	DSC	
William J. Masoner Jr.	USN	12	NC, SS (2), DFC (2)	"Ace in a day" 24 October 1944
William H. Mathis	USAAF	5	DFC	
Milden E. Mathre	USAAF	5	DFC	
Joseph Z. Matte	USAAF	5	DSC	
Chester K. Maxwell	USAAF	5	SS	
William R. Maxwell	USN	7	DFC	
Earl May	USN	8	SS, DFC (2)	KIFA 22 October 1951
Richard H. May	USN	5	DFC (5)	
Ben I. Mayo Jr.	USAAF	5	DFC	
Michele A. Mazzocco	USN	5	SS, DFC (2)	
Paul G. McArthur	USAAF	5	DSC	
T. H. McArthur	USAAF	5	DFC	KIFA May 1943
David McCampbell	USN	34	MOH, NC, SS, LOM, DFC (3)	"Ace in a day" 19 June and 24 October 1944. Holds US record with most kills in a single mission at 9. Top Navy ace and highest scoring ace to survive the war.
Henry A. McCartney Jr.	USMC	5	DFC	
Frank E. McCauley	USAAF	5.5	SS	
Thomas G. McClelland	USN	7.33	SS, DFC (3)	
Robert W. McClurg	USMC	7	DFC	
Carroll W. McColpin	USAAF	11		
Edward O. McComas	USAAF	14	SS, LOM	"Ace in a day" 23 December 1944
Charles M. McCorkle	USAAF	11	SS	
William A. McCormick Jr.	USN	7	DFC (2)	
Leo B. McCuddin	USN	5	NC, SS, DFC	
Elbert S. McCuskey	USN	13.5	NC (2), DFC (5)	"Ace in a day" 4 June 1942
Gordon H. McDaniel	USAAF	6	DSC	"Ace in a day" 14 March 1945
Norman L. McDonald	USAAF	11.5	DFC	
William F. McDonough	USAAF	5	SS	KIFA 22 April 1944
Donald McDowell	USAAF	8.5		
James N. McElroy	USAAF	5	DFC	
William D. McGarry	American Volunteer Group	8		
Donald C. McGee	USAAF	6	SS (2)	
John L. McGinn	USAAF	5		
Selva E. McGinty	USMC	5	DFC (2)	
Edward C. McGowan	USN	6.5	NC, DFC (2)	
Bernard L. McGrattan	USAAF	8.5	DFC	KIA 6 June 1944
Thomas B. McGuire Jr.	USAAF	38	MOH, DSC, SS (2), DFC (6)	KIA 7 January 1945
John W. McGuyrt	USAAF	5	SS	
Pierce W. McKennon	USAAF	11	DFC	KIFA 18 June 1947
Joseph T. McKeon	USAAF	6	SS	POW
Donald J. McKinley	USN	5	DFC	
William W. McLachlin	USN	5.5		
Murray D. McLaughlin	USAAF	7	SS	
John McManus	USMC	6	SS, DFC	
George B. McMillan	American Volunteer Group, USAAF	8.5	DFC	KIA 22 February 1944
Evan D. McMinn	USAAF	5		MIA 6 June 1944
Donald M. McPherson	USN	5	DFC (3)	
Hamilton McWhorter III	USN	12	DFC (5)	
Nicholas Megura	USAAF	11.83	DSC	
Roger W. Mehle	USN	13.5	SS, DFC (3)	
Henry H. Meigs	USAAF	6	SS	
Louis A. Menard	USN	9	SS, DFC	
Adolph Mencin	USN	6	SS, DFC	
Virgil K. Meroney	USAAF	9	SS	POW 8 April 1944, later escaped captivity
George L. Merritt Jr.	USAAF	5	DFC	KIA 7 June 1944
Donald W. Meuten	USAAF	6	SS	MIA 7 May 1944
John C. Meyer	USAAF	24	DSC (3), SS (2)	Claimed 2 additional victories during the Korean War
Frederick H. Michaelis	USN	5	NC, SS, DFC	
Henry J. Miklajcyk	USAAF	7.5	SS	KIA 2 November 1944
Armour C. Miller	USAAF	6	SS	
Everett Miller	USAAF	5	DFC	
Johnnie G. Miller	USN	8	NC, DFC (2)	"Ace in a day" 6 April 1945
Joseph E. Miller Jr.	USAAF	5	DFC	
Thomas F. Miller	USAAF	5.25	DFC	
Willard W. Millikan	USAAF	13	DSC	POW
Robert C. Milliken	USAAF	5	SS	
Henry L. Mills	USAAF	6	DFC	POW 6 March 1944, later escaped captivity
Charles B. Milton	USN	5	DFC (3)	
Robert Mims	USN	6	DFC	
Leslie D. Minchew	USAAF	5.5	SS	
Harris E. Mitchell	USN	10	SS, DFC (3)	
Henry E. Mitchell	USN	6	NC, DFC (2)	"Ace in a day" 21 March 1945, KIA April 1945
John W. Mitchell	USAAF	11	DSC, NC	Claimed 4 additional victories during the Korean War
Sanford K. Moats	USAAF	8.5	DSC, DFC (2)	
Leland P. Molland	USAAF	10.5	SS	KIA 16 May 1951
Norman W. Mollard	USN	6	DFC	
Arthur P. Mollenhauer	USN	5	NC	"Ace in a day" 12 October 1944
William W. Momyer	USAAF	8	DSC	
Franklin H. Monk	USAAF	5	DFC	
John R. Montapert	USN	6	SS, DFC	
John T. Moore	USAAF	7	SS	MIA 8 October 1944
Robert W. Moore	USAAF	12	SS	
Glennon T. Moran	USAAF	13	SS	
Horace B. Moranville	USN	6	DFC	POW 12 January 1945, only Navy ace to escape captivity during the war
James B. Morehead	USAAF	7	DSC, DFC (2)	
John L. Morgan Jr.	USMC	8.5	DFC	MIA 26 March 1945
Stanley B. Morrill	USAAF	9	SS	KIFA 29 March 1944
Bert D. (Wayne) Morris Jr.	USN	7	DFC (4)	
James M. Morris	USAAF	7.33	DSC	
Paul V. Morriss	USAAF	5	DFC	
Mark L. Moseley	USAAF	6.5	DFC	
William C. Moseley	USN	5	DFC	MIA 4 July 1944
Robert C. Moss	American Volunteer Group, USAAF	7		
James D. Mugavero	USAAF	6	SS	
Douglas W. Mulcahy	USN	8		
Robert F. Mulhollem	USAAF	5		
Paul A. Mullen	USMC	6.5	DFC	KIFA 12 February 1946
Arthur H. Munson	USN	5		
Paul C. Murphey Jr.	USAAF	6	DFC	
Alva C. Murphy	USAAF	6		MIA 2 March 1945
John B. Murphy	USAAF	6.75	SS	
Robert E. Murray	USN	10.33	SS, DFC (3)	
Jennings L. Myers	USAAF	5	DFC	MIA December 1943
Raymond B. Myers	USAAF	5.5		
Joseph L. Narr	USMC	7	NC	MIA 11 November 1942
Robert H. "Bob" Neale	American Volunteer Group	13		
H. A. Nelson	USN	5.2		
Robert J. Nelson	USN	7	DFC (2)	
Robert K. Nelson	USN	6.66	NC, DFC (3)	
John V. K. Newkirk	American Volunteer Group	7		
Franklin A. Nichols	USAAF	5		
Myrvin E. Noble	USN	7	DFC (2)	
Edward M. Nollmeyer	USAAF	5	SS (2)	
Cornelius N. Nooy	USN	19	NC (3), SS (2), DFC (2)	"Ace in a day" 21 September 1944
Louis H. "Red Dog" Norley	USAAF	10.33	SS	
Marvin R. Novak	USN	~5		
George P. Novotny	USAAF	8	DFC	
Cleveland L. Null	USN	9	DFC (3)	KIFA 9 October 1952
Gilbert M. O'Brien	USAAF	7	DFC	
William R. O'Brien	USAAF	5.5	DFC	
Frank Q. O'Connor	USAAF	10.75	DSC	POW 5 November 1944
Edward H. "Butch" O'Hare	USN	7	MOH, NC	"Ace in a day" 20 February 1942. MIA 26 November 1943
Jeremiah J. O'Keefe	USMC	7	NC, DFC	"Ace in a day" 22 April 1945
Paul O'Mara Jr.	USN	7	SS, DFC (5)	
Eugene W. O'Neill	USAAF	5	SS	
John G. O'Neill	USAAF	8	SS	
Lawrence F. O'Neill	USAAF	5	DSC	
Jack J. Oberhansly	USAAF	6	DFC	
Harvey G. Odenbrett	USN	7	NC	
Fred F. Ohr	USAAF	6	SS	
Edwin L. Olander	USMC	5	DFC	
Charles H. "Chuck" Older	American Volunteer Group, USAAF	18	DFC	
Robin Olds	USAAF	13	SS (2), DFC (2)	Later claimed 4 more victories and was awarded the Air Force Cross during the Vietnam War.
Austin LeRoy Olsen	USN	5	SS, DFC	
Norman E. Olson	USAAF	6	DFC	KIA 8 April 1944
Paul E. Olson Jr.	USAAF	5		"Ace in a day" and POW 18 December 1944
John Orth	USN	6	NC	
Ernest K. Osher	USAAF	5	DFC	
Charles H. Ostrom	USN	7		
Edward C. Outlaw	USN	6	NC, LOM, DFC (3)	"Ace in a day" 29 April 1944
Robert J. Overcash	USAAF	5	DFC	
Edmund F. Overend	American Volunteer Group, USMC	8	DFC	
Lloyd J. Overfield	USAAF	11	SS	
Edward W. Overton Jr.	USN	5	NC (2), DFC (2)	
Donald C. Owen	USMC	5	DFC (3)	
Edward M. Owen	USN	5	DFC (3)	
Joel A. Owens	USAAF	5	SS	
Marion P. "Dutch" Owens	USAAF	5	DSC	
Robert G. Owens Jr.	USMC	7	NC, DFC (5)	
Melvyn R. Paisley	USAAF	8	DSC, SS (2)	Only Ace of the 366th FG
Forrest F. Parham	USAAF	5	DFC	
Joel B. Paris III	USAAF	9	SS	
Harry A. Parker	USAAF	13	SS (2)	KIA 22 April 1945
Elbert W. Parrish	USN	6	SS	
James J. Pascoe	USAAF	5.5	DFC	
Joseph J. Paskoski	USN	6	NC, SS	
Edsel Paulk	USAAF	5	DFC	
Carl W. Payne	USAAF	6	DFC	Only American ace to destroy Vichy French, German, Italian, and Japanese planes. KIFA 9 January 1956
Frederick R. Payne Jr.	USMC	5.5	NC, DFC	
James L. Pearce	USN	5.25	DFC (3)	
James E. Peck	British Royal Air Force, USAAF	6	DFC	KIFA
James G. Percy	USMC	6	NC, DFC (5)	
Oscar F. Perdomo	USAAF	5	DSC	"Ace in a day" 13 August 1945. Last American ace of the war.
Chesley G. Peterson	Royal Air Force, USAAF	10	DSC	
Richard A. Peterson	USAAF	15.5	SS	
David P. Phillips	USN	5	SS, DFC	
Edward A. Phillips	USN	5	SS, DFC (2)	
Hyde Phillips	USMC	5	DFC	KIFA 14 August 1952
Harvey P. Picken	USN	11	SS, DFC (2)	
Francis E. Pierce Jr.	USMC	6	NC, DFC	
Joseph F. Pierce	USAAF	7	DFC	POW 21 May 1943, later executed.
Sammy A. Pierce	USAAF	7	DSC	
John Pietz Jr.	USAAF	6	DFC	
George W. Pigman Jr.	USN	8.5	DFC (3)	
Spiros N. Pisanos	USAAF	10	DFC	
Jack Pittman Jr.	USMC	5	DFC (3)	KIFA 12 April 1966
Hiram Clifford Pitts	USAAF	6		
Claude W. Plant	USN	8.5	SS, DFC	MIA 12 September 1944
James N. Poindexter	USAAF	7	SS	KIFA 3 March 1945
Peter E. Pompetti	USAAF	5	DFC (4)	POW 17 March 1944
Zenneth A. Pond	USMC	6	NC	MIA 10 September 1942
Kenneth R. Pool	USAAF	5	DFC	
Tilman E. Pool	USN	6	DFC (4)	
Albert J. Pope	USN	7.25	DFC	
Edward Popek	USAAF	7	DFC	
Philip B. Porter	USAAF	5		
Robert Bruce Porter	USMC	5	DFC (2)	Only Marine pilot to score victories in F4U and F6F
George H. Poske	USMC	5	DFC	
Nathan T. Post	USMC	8	DFC (3)	
Ralston M. Pound Jr.	USN	6	DFC (2)	
Ernest A. Powell	USMC	5	NC	MIA July 1943
Joe H. Powers Jr.	USAAF	14.5	SS	MIA 18 January 1951
MacArthur Powers	Royal Air Force, USAAF	7	SS	"Ace in a day" 18 April 1943
Luther D. Prater Jr.	USN	8.5	NC, DFC	
George E. "Ratsy" Preddy Jr.	USAAF	26.83	DSC	"Ace in a day" 6 August 1944. KIA 25 December 1944
Robert W. Prescott	American Volunteer Group	5.5		
Frank H. Presley	USMC	5	NC	
Jack C. Price	USAAF	5	DFC	
Melvin M. Prichard	USN	5.25	SS, DFC (2)	
Royce W. Priest	USAAF	5	DSC	
Roger C. Pryor	USAAF	5	DFC	POW 26 March 1943, escaped captivity 1 May 1945.
John Forrest Pugh	USAAF	6	DFC	
John E. Purdy	USAAF	7	DFC	
Norwald R. Quiel	USN	6	SS	
Donald L. Quigley	USAAF	5	SS	POW 10 August 1944
Michael J. Quirk	USAAF	11	SS	POW 10 September 1944
Valentine S. Rader	USAAF	6.5	SS, DFC	KIFA 1950
Orvin H. Ramlo	USMC	7	NC, DFC	
Robert J. Rankin	USAAF	10	DSC	"Ace in a day" 12 May 1944
C. B. Ray	USAAF	5	DFC (2)	
James V. Reber Jr.	USN	11	SS, DFC (2)	
Edward F. Rector	American Volunteer Group, USAAF	7.75	SS, DFC (2)	
Eugene D. Redmond	USN	9.25	DFC (3)	KIFA 3 June 1951
William N. Reed	American Volunteer Group, USAAF	9	SS, LOM, DFC (4)	KIFA 19 December 1944
William C. Reese	USAAF	5	DFC	KIA 21 May 1944
Horace B. Reeves	USAAF	6	DFC	
Leonard R. Reeves	USAAF	6	DFC (4)	
Francis R. Register	USN	7	DFC (2)	KIFA 16 May 1943
Daniel R. Rehm Jr.	USN	13	DFC (2)	
Thomas H. Reidy	USN	10	NC, DFC (5)	
Joseph H. Reinburg	USMC	7	DFC (5)	
Russell L. Reiserer	USN	9	NC, DFC	"Ace in a day" 19 October 1944
Thomas J. Rennemo	USN	6	DFC (3)	
Joseph E. Reulet	USN	5	DFC (2)	
Glenn M. Revel	USN	5.75	DFC (2)	
Andrew J. Reynolds	USAAF	9.33	SS (2), DFC	
Robert P. Reynolds	USAAF	7	SS, DFC	POW 12 September 1944
Thomas W. Rhodes	USN	5		
Elmer W. Richardson	USAAF	8	SS, DFC (2)	
Robert H. Riddle	USAAF	11	SS, DFC	
Vincent A. Rieger	USN	5	DFC	
Alden P. Rigby	USAAF	5	SS	
James F. Rigg	USN	11	NC, DFC (6)	"Ace in a day" 12 September 1944
Elwyn G. Righetti	USAAF	7.5	DSC, SS, DFC (4)	MIA 17 April 1945
Paul S. Riley	USAAF	6.5	DFC (5)	POW 24 April 1944
Ben Rimerman	USAAF	5	SS, DFC (4)	KIFA 11 August 1945
Andrew J. Ritchey	USAAF	5	DSC, DFC (2)	
Joe D. Robbins	USN	5	DFC (2)	
Jay T. Robbins	USAAF	22	DSC (2), SS, DFC (4)	
Arval J. Roberson	USAAF	6	DFC (4)	
Daniel T. Roberts Jr.	USAAF	14	DSC, DFC (3)	KIA 9 November 1943
Eugene P. Roberts	USAAF	9	DSC, SS, DFC (4)	
Newell O. Roberts	USAAF	5	DFC	
LeRoy W. Robinson	USN	5	DFC (5)	
Ross F. Robinson	USN	5	DFC (2)	KIFA 29 September 1946
Edward F. Roddy	USAAF	8	SS, DFC	
F. Michael Rogers	USAAF	7	SS, DFC	
Franklin Rose Jr.	USAAF	5	SS (2), DFC (2)	
Ralph J. Rosen	USN	6	DFC (3)	
Herbert E. Ross	USAAF	7	SS, DFC	
Robert P. Ross	USN	5.5	NC, SS	
Herman J. Rossi Jr.	USN	6	NC (2)	
John R. Rossi	American Volunteer Group	6	DFC	
Gerald L. Rounds	USAAF	5	SS, DFC (2)	
Robert R. Rowland	USAAF	8	DFC	
LeRoy A. Ruder	USAAF	5.5	DFC (2)	KIA 6 June 1944
Henry S. Rudolph	USAAF	5	SS, DFC	
John W. Ruhsam	USMC	7	NC, DFC	
Donald E. Runyon	USN	11	NC, DFC	
Roy W. Rushing	USN	13	NC, DFC (4)	"Ace in a day" 24 October 1944
William A. Rynne	USAAF	5	DFC	POW 28 March 1944
Robert J. Sandell	American Volunteer Group	5		
Philip Sangermano	USAAF	8	SS, DFC	
Donald H. Sapp	USMC	10	NC, DFC (2)	
John J. Sargent	USN	5.25	DFC (2)	KIA 11 May 1945 aboard USS Bunker Hill
Jimmie E. Savage	USN	7	DFC (3)	
Charles W. Sawyer	American Volunteer Group, USAAF	8		
Harrell H. Scales	USN	6.25	DFC (3)	
Hartwell V. Scarborough Jr.	USMC	5	DFC (6)	
Thomas D. Schank	USAAF	5	SS, DFC	
Gordon E. Schecter	USN	5	SS	MIA 18 March 1945
Wilbur R. Scheible	USAAF	6	SS, DFC	
John L. Schell	USN	5	DFC (2)	
Frank Schiel	American Volunteer Group	7		
William J. Schildt	USAAF	6	DFC	
James E. Schiller	USN	5	DFC	
David C. Schilling	USAAF	22.5	DSC (2), SS (2), DFC (9)	"Ace in a day" 23 December 1944
Glenn D. Schiltz Jr.	USAAF	8	DSC, SS, DFC (4)	MIA in Korea
Robert G. Schimanski	USAAF	6	DFC	
Albert L. Schlegel	Royal Air Force, USAAF	8.5	DFC (5)	KIA 28 August 1944
Leroy A. Schreiber	USAAF	12	DSC, DFC (5)	KIA 15 April 1944
Louis Schriber	USAAF	5	DFC (2)	
Duerr H. Schuh	USAAF	5	DFC	
Robert B. Schultz (Shoals)	USAAF	5	SS, DFC (3)	
Robert L. Scott Jr.	USAAF	10	SS	
Alexander F. Sears	USAAF	5	DFC (2)	KIFA 22 October 1951
Meldrum L. Sears	USAAF	7	DFC (2)	
Albert Seckel Jr.	USN	6	NC, SS, DFC	
Robert B. See	USMC	5	DFC (3)	
Harold E. Segal	USMC	12	DFC (3)	
Robert K. Seidman	USAAF	5	SS, DFC	KIA 14 April 1944
Larry R. Self	USN	8.5	NC, DFC (2)	
Robert W. Shackford	USN	5	DFC (5)	
Dale E. Shafer	USAAF	7	DFC (3)	
Courtney Shands	USN	6	NC	"Ace in a day" 7 August 1942
Edward O. Shaw	USMC	14.5	DFC (2)	KIFA 1944
Robert M. Shaw	USAAF	8	DFC (2)	
Hugh V. Sherrill	USN	5.5	NC, DFC	
Charles A. Shields	USN	5		
Ernest Shipman	USAAF	7	SS, DFC	POW 30 July 1944
James A. Shirley	USN	12.5	NC, DFC	"Ace in a day" 24 October 1944
William A. Shomo	USAAF	8	MOH, DFC	"Ace in a day" 11 January 1945
Robert L. Shoup	USAAF	5.5	DFC	POW 20 May 1944
Murray J. Shubin	USAAF	11	DSC, DFC (2)	"Ace in a day" 16 June 1943
Lucien B. Shuler	USAAF	7	DFC (3)	
Perry L. Shuman	USMC	6	DFC (8)	
Wallace E. Sigler	USMC	5	DFC	
Sam L. Silber	USN	7	LOM, DFC (4)	
John M. Simmons	USAAF	7	SS, DFC	KIFA 18 January 1961
William J. Simmons	USAAF	6	SS	MIA 25 April 1944
Arthur Singer Jr.	USN	10	DFC (5)	
Lester H. Sipes	USN	5	DFC (2)	
Frank Sistrunk	USN	5	DFC (3)	MIA 3 September 1951
Norman C. Skogstad	USAAF	12	SS, DFC	
Warren A. Skon	USN	7	NC, DFC (4)	
Albert C. Slack	USN	6.5	SS	
William J. Sloan	USAAF	12	Air Force Cross, DFC	
Armistead B. Smith Jr.	USN	10	SS, DFC (4)	
Carl E. Smith	USN	5	DFC (4)	
Carroll C. Smith	USAAF	7	SS	Top night fighter ace
Clinton L. Smith	USN	6	DFC (2)	
Cornelius M. Smith Jr.	USAAF	11	SS, DFC (4)	
Daniel F. Smith Jr.	USN	6	NC, SS, LOM, DFC (4)	
Donovan F. Smith	USAAF	5.5	DSC, DFC (4)	
Jack R. Smith	USAAF	5	DFC (2)	
John C. Smith	USAAF	6	DFC	KIA 9 November 1943
John L. Smith	USMC	19	MOH, LOM, DFC	
John M. Smith	USN	10	SS, DFC (5)	
Kenneth Darwin Smith	USN	5		
Kenneth G. Smith	USAAF	5	DFC (3)	POW 21 March 1944. KIFA 20 October 1947
Leslie C. Smith	USAAF	7	DFC (5)	
Meryl M. Smith	USAAF	9	SS, DFC (3)	MIA 7 December 1944
Nicholas J. Smith	USN	6	DFC (2)	
Paul A. Smith	USAAF	5	DFC (2)	
Richard E. "Snuffy" Smith	USAAF	7	SS, DFC (2)	
Robert H. Smith	American Volunteer Group	5		
Robert T. Smith	American Volunteer Group, USAAF	9	SS, DFC	
Virgil H. Smith	USAAF	6	DFC (3)	KIA 1 January 1943
William N. Snider	USMC	11	SS, DFC (3)	
Irl V. Sonner Jr.	USN	5	SS, DFC	KIFA 22 March 1945
James J. "Pug" Southerland	USN	5	SS, DFC (2)	KIFA 12 October 1949
Kenneth C. Sparks	USAAF	11	SS, DFC (4)	KIFA 5 September 1944
Harold L. Spears	USMC	15	DFC	KIFA 6 December 1944
Dale F. Spencer	USAAF	9.5	DSC, DFC (4)	
Clyde P. Spitler	USN	5	SS, DFC	
Richard E. Stambook	USN	10	SS, DFC (2)	
Paul M. Stanch	USAAF	10	SS, DFC (5)	
William J. Stangel	USAAF	5	DFC	
Gordon A. Stanley	USN	8	SS, DFC (4)	KIFA 19 April 1956
Morris A. Stanley	USAAF	5	DFC (2)	
Arland Stanton	USAAF	8	SS, DFC (3)	
Walter E. Starck	USAAF	7	DFC (4)	POW 27 November 1944
Carlton B. Starkes	USN	6	NC, DFC (2)	
James R. Starnes	USAAF	6	DFC (2)	
Edgar E. Stebbins	USN	5		
Robert W. Stephens	USAAF	13	SS, DFC	KIFA 1960
Everett W. Stewart	USAAF	7.83	SS, DFC (4)	
James C. Stewart	USAAF	11.5	DSC, DFC (5)	
James S. Stewart	USN	10	NC, DFC (2)	
John S. Stewart	USAAF	9	SS, DFC (2)	
Charles R. Stimpson	USN	16	NC, DFC (3)	"Ace in a day" 14 October 1944
John D. Stokes	USN	6.5	SS, DFC	
Carl V. Stone	USN	5	DFC (3)	KIFA 13 March 1967
Robert J. Stone	USAAF	7		"Ace in a day" 10 June 1945
John A. Storch	USAAF	10.5	SS, DFC (3)	
Robert F. Stout	USMC	6	NC, DFC	KIA 4 March 1945
Donald J. Strait	USAAF	13.5	SS, DFC (3)	
William H. Strand	USAAF	7	SS (2), DFC (6)	
John R. Strane	USN	13	SS, DFC (7)	
Johnnie C. Strange	USN	5	DFC	
Frederick J. Streig	USN	5.5	DFC (3)	
Harvey W. Sturdevant	USN	6	DFC (4)	
John L. Sublett	USAAF	8	DFC	
Richard C. Suehr	USAAF	5	SS, DFC (2)	
Charles P. Sullivan	USAAF	5	SS, DFC	
Elliot Summer	USAAF	10	SS, DFC (2)	
Robert C. Sutcliffe	USAAF	5	DFC (3)	
John F. Sutherland	USN	6.5	DFC (2)	
James E. Swett	USMC	15.5	MOH, DFC (6)	"Ace in a day" 7 April 1943
Harryn W. Swinburne	USN	5	DFC (2)	First pilot to fly a helicopter in combat
James S. Swope	USN	9.66	DFC (2)	
William J. Sykes	USAAF	5	DFC	POW 25 December 1944
John C. C. Symmes	USN	11	NC (2), DFC (2)	
Stanley T. Synar	USMC	5	DFC	
Gilbert F. Talbot	USAAF	5	DFC (2)	
William F. Tanner	USAAF	5.5	DFC (4)	
James B. Tapp	USAAF	8	DSC, DFC	
Kenneth M. Taylor	USAAF	6	DSC	First Army Air Forces pilot to be awarded DSC during war. Is officially only credited with 3 victories.
Oliver B. Taylor	USAAF	5	SS	
Ralph G. Taylor Jr.	USAAF	6	DFC	
Ray A. Taylor Jr.	USN	6.5	DFC (2)	
Will W. Taylor	USN	6	SS, DFC	
Francis A. Terrill	USMC	6.5	DFC (2)	KIFA 12 January 1946
John S. "Jimmy" Thach	USN	6	NC (2), SS, LOM	
W. Paul Thayer	USN	6.5	DFC (3)	
Robert H. Thelen	USN	6.5	DFC	
Franklin C. Thomas Jr.	USMC	9	NC	
Robert F. Thomas	USN	5.25	NC, DFC	
Wilbur J. Thomas	USMC	18.5	NC, DFC (2)	KIFA 28 January 1947
Robert D. Thompson	USAAF	5	DFC	
John F. Thornell Jr.	USAAF	17.25	DSC, DFC (6)	
David F. Thwaites	USAAF	6	DFC (3)	
Harrison R. Thyng	USAAF	5	SS	5 additional victories during the Korean War
Robert E. Tierney	USAAF	5		
John A. Tilley	USAAF	5	DFC	
Reade F. Tilley	Royal Canadian Air Force	7	DFC (UK)	Born in Florida.
Edward W. Toaspern	USN	7	DFC (4)	
John W. Topliff	USN	5	DFC (3)	
Harrison B. "Bud" Tordoff	USAAF	5	DFC	
Ross E. Torkelson	USN	5	DFC	
Philip E. Tovrea Jr.	USAAF	8	SS, DFC	
Eugene P. Townsend	USN	5	NC	"Ace in a day" 24 October 1944
Frederick W. Tracey	USN	5	NC, SS	
Frederick O. Trafton Jr.	USAAF	5	SS, DFC	
Franklin W. Troup	USN	7	DFC (2)	
Eugene A. Trowbridge	USMC	6	NC	
Clifton H. Troxell	USAAF	5	SS, DFC (3)	
Myron M. Truax	USN	7	NC (2), DFC	
John H. Truluck	USAAF	7	DSC, DFC (4)	
Grant M. Turley	USAAF	6	SS, DFC	KIA
Charles H. Turner	USN	6	DFC (2)	
Edward B. Turner	USN	7	NC	"Ace in a day" 18 October 1944
Richard E. Turner	USAAF	11	DFC (2)	
William L. Turner	USAAF	8	DSC, SS, DFC (3)	
Wendell V. Twelves	USN	13	NC, SS, DFC (6)	
Gerald E. Tyler	USAAF	7	DFC (2)	
James O. Tyler	USAAF	8	DFC (2)	
Vernon R. Ude	USN	5	DFC (3)	
Donald E. Umphres	USN	6	DFC (3)	KIFA 4 June 1947
Eugene A. Valencia Jr.	USN	23	NC, DFC (6)	"Ace in a day" 17 April 1945
Herbert J. Valentine	USMC	6	NC, DFC (2)	"Ace in a day" 25 May 1945
Rudolph D. Van Dyke	USN	5	SS, DFC	KIFA 1 June 1953
Peter J. Van der Linden Jr.	USN	5	DFC (2)	
Arthur Van Haren Jr.	USN	9	DFC (3)	
George R. Vanden Heuvel	USAAF	5.5	DFC (2)	
James S. Varnell Jr.	USAAF	17	SS, DFC (3)	KIFA 9 April 1945
Harley C. Vaughn	USAAF	7	DFC (2)	
Robert H. Vaught	USAAF	5	SS	
Milton N. Vedder	USMC	6	DFC (2)	KIA 11 February 1944
Stanley W. "Swede" Vejtasa	USN	10.25	NC (3)	"Ace in a day" 26 October 1942
Clinton D. Vincent	USAAF	6	SS, LOM, DFC (3)	
Merriwell W. Vineyard	USN	6	DFC (6)	Also flew in Royal Canadian Air Force
Arnold E. Vinson	USAAF	5.3	DFC (3)	MIA 3 April 1943
Herman W. Visscher	USAAF	5	DFC	Shot down a sixth plane in Korean War
Harold E. Vita	USN	6	SS (2), DFC (2)	
John E. Vogt	USAAF	5	DSC	"Ace in a day" 28 May 1945
John W. Vogt Jr.	USAAF	8	DFC (5)	
John J. Voll	USAAF	21	DSC, SS, DFC (2)	"Ace in a day" 16 November 1944
Roy M. Voris	USN	7	DFC	
Albert O. Vorse Jr.	USN	11.5	NC, SS, DFC (2)	
Alexander Vraciu	USN	19	NC, DFC (3)	"Ace in a day" 19 June 1944
Lance C. "Wildcat" Wade	Royal Air Force	23	DFC(UK) & Bar	Born in Texas. KIFA 12 January 1944
Robert Wade	USMC	7	NC, DFC (2)	
Horace Q. Waggoner	USAAF	5	DFC (2)	
Boyd D. "Buzz" Wagner	USAAF	8	DSC, DFC	First Army Air Force ace of World War II. KIFA 29 November 1942
John W. Wainwright Jr.	USAAF	6	DSC	"Ace in a day" 28 September 1944. KIFA 7 July 1945
Joe W. Waits	USAAF	5.5	DFC	
Thomas H. Walker	USAAF	6	DFC	
Walter B. Walker Jr.	USAAF	5	DFC	
Kenneth A. Walsh	USMC	21	MOH, DFC (7)	First F4U Corsair ace
Ralph H. Wandrey	USAAF	6	DFC (2)	
Lyttleton T. Ward	USN	5	NC, SS, DFC	
Victor E. Warford	USAAF	8	SS (2)	POW 11 October 1944
Arthur T. Warner	USMC	8	NC, DFC	
Jack R. Warren	USAAF	5	DFC	MIA March 1944
Edward T. Waters	USAAF	7	DFC	
James A. Watkins	USAAF	12	DSC	
Ralph J. Watson	USAAF	5	LOM, DFC (4)	
Charles E. Watts	USN	8.75	NC, DFC (3)	
Oran S. Watts	USAAF	5	DFC (2)	
Sidney W. Weatherford	USAAF	5	DFC (2)	MIA 11 August 1952
Charles E. Weaver	USAAF	8		
Claude Weaver III	Royal Canadian Air Force	12.5	DFC (UK)	Born in Oklahoma. Youngest Allied ace of the war. POW 9 September 1942, later escaped captivity. DOW 28 January 1944.
Wilbur B. Webb	USN	7	NC, DFC (2)	
Willard J. Webb	USAAF	5	DFC (3)	
Gregory J. Weissenberger	USMC	5	DFC (3)	
Darrell G. Welch	USAAF	5	SS, DFC	
George S. Welch	USAAF	16	DSC, DFC (3)	First Army Air Force pilot to shoot down an enemy plane during the war. KIFA 12 October 1954
Robert E. Welch	USAAF	6	SS, DFC	KIFA 23 March 1951
Robert D. Welden	USAAF	6.25	DFC	
Albert P. Wells	USMC	5	DFC (2)	
Edward G. Wendorf	USN	5	DFC (3)	
Arthur E. Wenige	USAAF	6	SS, DFC (2)	
John M. Wesolowski	USN	7	DFC (2)	
Warren M. Wesson	USAAF	5	DFC	
Richard L. West	USAAF	14	DSC, SS, DFC (3)	
Robert G. West	USN	5	DFC (3)	
Robert B. Westbrook	USAAF	20	DSC, DFC (2)	MIA 22 November 1944
Raymond S. Wetmore	USAAF	21.25	DSC (2), SS, DFC (5)	KIFA 14 February 1951
William E. Whalen	USAAF	6	SS, DFC	
Elmer M. Wheadon	USAAF	7	SS, DFC	"Ace in a day" 1 July 1943
William T. Whisner	USAAF	15.5	DSC (2), SS, DFC (3)	"Ace in a day" 21 November 1944. Scored 6.5 additional victories with U.S. Air Force and award third DSC during Korean War.
Henry S. White	USN	5	DFC (2)	
John H. White	USAAF	5	DFC (2)	KIFA 5 October 1945
Robert H. White	USAAF	9	SS, DFC (4)	
Thomas A. White	USAAF	6	DFC (2)	
Roy E. Whittaker	USAAF	7	DFC (4)	
Samuel J. Wicker	USAAF	7	SS, DFC	
David C. Wilhelm	USAAF	6	DFC (2)	
Paul H. Wilkins	USAAF	5	DFC (3)	
James W. Wilkinson	USAAF	6	DSC, DFC (3)	KIFA 4 June 1944
Bruce W. Williams	USN	7	NC, DFC (3)	
Gerard M. H. Williams	USMC	7	DFC (2)	
James M. Williams	USAAF	6	DFC	
Russell D. Williams	USAAF	5	DFC (3)	
Felix D. Williamson	USAAF	13	DSC, DFC (4)	"Ace in a day" 14 January 1945. KIFA 24 February 1947
Robert C. Wilson	USN	6	DFC (2)	
William F. Wilson	USAAF	5	SS, DFC	KIFA 12 November 1947
Murray Winfield	USN	8	SS, DFC (3)	
Robert P. Winks	USAAF	5.5	DFC (2)	
Robert A. Winston	USN	5	DFC	
Theodore H. Winters Jr.	USN	8	NC (2), SS (3), DFC	
Calvin C. Wire	USAAF	7	DFC (4)	
Ralph L. Wire	USAAF	5	DFC (2)	
John L. Wirth	USN	14	NC, SS (2), DFC	KIFA 13 April 1945
Lee V. Wiseman	USAAF	5	SS	
Lynn E. Witt Jr.	USAAF	6	DSC, SS, DFC (3)	
John T. Wolf	USN	7	DFC (2)	
Judge E. Wolfe	USAAF	9	SS, DFC (2)	KIFA 24 November 1948
John L. Wolford	USAAF	5	DFC	MIA 20 May 1943
Walter A. Wood	USN	5.5	SS	
Sidney S. Woods	USAAF	7	DSC, SS, DFC (3)	"Ace in a day" 22 March 1945. POW 16 April 1945
Robert E. Woody	USAAF	7	DSC, DFC	
Millard Wooley Jr.	USN	5	DFC (2)	
Robert C. Woolverton	USN	6	DFC (3)	
Malcolm T. Wordell	USN	7	NC (2), DFC (3)	
George L. Wrenn	USN	5.25	NC, DFC	
Ellis W. Wright Jr.	USAAF	6	DSC	
Max J. Wright	USAAF	5	SS	
Robert R. Yaeger Jr.	USAAF	5	SS, DFC (4)	
Charles Elwood Yeager	USAAF	13	SS, DFC	"Ace in a day" 12 October 1944. First man to break the sound barrier 14 October 1947
Harold Yeremain	USN	6	DFC (3)	KIFA 13 August 1951
Robert M. York	USAAF	5	SS	
Donald K. Yost	USMC	8	SS, DFC	
Michael R. Yunck	USMC	5	SS, DFC	
Earling W. Zaeske	USN	5	DFC (2)	
Hubert "Hub" Zemke	USAAF	17.75	DSC, SS, DFC (8)	POW 30 October 1944
John A. Zink	USN	5	DFC	
Daniel J. Zoerb	USAAF	7	SS, DFC (3)	
Charles J. Zubarik	USAAF	8	DFC	POW 24 May 1943

== Notes ==
=== Abbreviations ===
- "DOW" in Notes means Died of Wounds which, in some cases, may have occurred months later.
- "KIA" in Notes means Killed in action (dates are included where possible).
- "KIFA" in Notes means Killed in Flying Accident.
- "MIA" in Notes means Missing in action.
- "POW" in Notes means Prisoner of War.
- "USAAF" means United States Army Air Forces
- "USMC" means United States Marine Corps
- "USN" means United States Navy

=== Awards ===
Award	Title	Notes
DFC	Distinguished Flying Cross	The Distinguished Flying Cross is a medal awarded to any officer or enlisted member of the United States armed forces who distinguishes himself or herself in support of operations by "heroism or extraordinary achievement while participating in an aerial flight".
DFC(UK)	Distinguished Flying Cross (United Kingdom)	Awarded to Royal Air Force commissioned officers and Warrant Officers for "an act or acts of valour, courage or devotion to duty whilst flying in active operations against the enemy".
DSC	Distinguished Service Cross	The Distinguished Service Cross is the second highest medal for gallantry awarded to any member of the Army and Army Air Force for "extraordinary heroism not justifying the Medal of Honor".
LOM	Legion of Merit	The Legion of Merit is a medal awarded to members of the Uniformed Services of the United States and members of allied armed forces for "exceptionally meritorious conduct in the performance of outstanding services and achievements".
MOH	Medal of Honor	The Medal of Honor is the highest and most prestigious military decoration awarded to any member of the US Armed Forces for "conspicuous gallantry and intrepidity at the risk of life above and beyond the call of duty".
NC	Navy Cross	The Navy Cross is the second highest medal for gallantry awarded to any member of the Navy and the Marine Corps who "distinguishes himself or herself in action by extraordinary heroism in combat not justifying the Medal of Honor."
SS	Silver Star	The Silver Star is a medal awarded to any officer or enlisted member of the United States armed forces who distinguishes himself or herself by "gallantry in action against an enemy of the United States"
