= List of World War II aces credited with 6 victories =

Fighter aces in World War II had tremendously varying kill scores, affected as they were by many factors: the pilot's skill level, the performance of the airplane the pilot flew and the planes they flew against, how long they served, their opportunity to meet the enemy in the air (Allied to Axis disproportion), whether they were the formation's leader or a wingman, the standards their air service brought to the awarding of victory credits, et cetera.

== Aces ==
This background, along with the symbol "†", indicates that the pilot was killed in action, missing in action, died of wounds, or was killed in a flying accident during World War II.

Name	Country	Service(s)	Aerial victories	Other aerial victories	Notes
Karol Pniak	Poland	Polish Air Force; Royal Air Force	6.75		
Basil Gerald "Stapme" Stapleton	South Africa	Royal Air Force	6.66		
Richard Edward Fowler	United States	U.S. Navy	6.5		
Howard Peter Blatchford †	Canada	Royal Canadian Air Force	6.5		
Lloyd Chadburn †	Canada	Royal Canadian Air Force	6.5		
James Douglas Lindsay	Canada	Royal Canadian Air Force	6.5		+2 in Korean War
Willard Eder	United States	U.S. Navy	6.5		
Russell Foskett	Australia	Royal Australian Air Force	6.5		
Wacław Łapkowski	Poland	Polish Air Force; Royal Air Force	6.33		
Alan Peart	New Zealand	Royal New Zealand Air Force	6.33		
Horia Agarici	Kingdom of Romania	Royal Romanian Air Force	6		
Florin Alexiu	Kingdom of Romania	Royal Romanian Air Force	6		
Andreas Antoniou	Greece	Royal Hellenic Air Force	6		
GianLino Baschirotto	Kingdom of Italy	Regia Aeronautica	6	+5 in Spanish Civil War	Ace in each of two wars
Livio Bassi	Kingdom of Italy	Regia Aeronautica	6		
Wolfrath Bauer †	Germany	Luftwaffe	6		Night fighter ace
Henry S. Bille	United States	U.S. Army Air Forces	6		(+4 ground kills)
Scrappy Blumer	United States	U.S. Army Air Forces	6		Ace in a day (fifteen minutes)
Yekaterina Budanova	Soviet Union	Soviet Air Force	6		possibly 11, +5 shared
Harry C. Crim	United States	U.S. Army Air Forces	6		(+5.25 damage) 531st Fighter Squadron, PTO
James B. Dalglish	United States	U.S. Army Air Forces	6		(+3 V-1 flying bombs)
Edward Darling †	United Kingdom	Royal Air Force Volunteer Reserve	6		
František Doležal	Czechoslovakia	Royal Air Force	6		
Bryan Draper †	United Kingdom	Royal Air Force Volunteer Reserve	6		
Urban L. Drew	United States	U.S. Army Air Forces	6		
Josef Dygrýn-Ligotický †	Czechoslovakia	Royal Air Force	6		
Stanislav Fejfar †	Czechoslovakia	Royal Air Force	6		
Guido Fibbia	Kingdom of Italy	Regia Aeronautica	6	+3 in Spanish Civil War	
Carlos Faustinos	Mexico	Mexican Air Force	6		Also known as Charlie Foster.
Ervin Flóznik †	Hungary	Royal Hungarian Air Force	6		
Andrew J. Evans Jr.	United States	U.S. Army Air Forces	6		
James W. Griffis	United States	U.S. Army Air Forces	6	3 probable all with 1st FG, 94th SQ, 15th AF	
Clayton Kelly Gross	United States	U.S. Army Air Forces	6		355th FS, 354th FG, ETO
Fred R. Haviland Jr.	United States	U.S. Army Air Forces	6		(+6 ground kills)
Michael Herrick †	New Zealand	Royal Air Force	6		
Horace B. Moranville	United States	U.S. Navy	6		
James P. Hagerstrom	United States	U.S. Army Air Forces	6		
Stefan Janus	Poland	Polish Air Force; Royal Air Force	6		
Oskar Köstler †	Germany	Luftwaffe	6		
Fritz Kruse †	Germany	Luftwaffe	6		Night fighter ace
Kenneth Lake	United States	U.S. Navy	6		
Mihály Karátsonyi	Hungary	Royal Hungarian Air Force	6		
Lajos Kracsenics	Hungary	Royal Hungarian Air Force	6		
Raymond Lallemant	Belgium	Royal Air Force	6		
Joseph Larichelière †	Canada	Royal Air Force	6		
Mátyás Lőrincz †	Hungary	Royal Hungarian Air Force	6		
János Mátyás	Hungary	Royal Hungarian Air Force	6		
Robert Mcwherter	United States	U.S. Army Air Forces	6		First Three kill with 17th PS in the PTO, other three with 363rd FS in ETO
György Michna	Hungary	Royal Hungarian Air Force	6		
Norman W. Mollard, Jr.	United States	U.S. Navy	6		
Kálmán Nánási †	Hungary	Royal Hungarian Air Force	6		
Norman E. Olson	United States	U.S. Army Air Forces	6		(+2 ground kills)
Theo Osterkamp	Germany	Luftwaffe	6	+32 in World War I	Ace in each of two wars
Edward Cobb Outlaw	United States	U.S. Navy	6		Ace in a day
Imre Pánczél †	Hungary	Royal Hungarian Air Force	6		
Ludwik Witold Paszkiewicz	Poland	Polish Air Force; Royal Air Force	6		
Jacques Philippart †	Belgium	Royal Air Force	6		
Eduard M. Prchal	Czechoslovakia	Royal Air Force	6		
John F. Pugh	United States	U.S. Army Air Forces	6		357th FG, 362nd Fighter Squadron, ETO
Leonard R. Reeves	United States	U.S. Army Air Forces	6		DFC, 530th Fighter Squadron, CBI
Radu Reinek	Kingdom of Romania	Royal Romanian Air Force	6		
Thomas J. Rennemo	United States	U.S. Navy	6		
W. R. Scheible	United States	U.S. Army Air Forces	6		(+3 ground kills)
Pál Szikora	Hungary	Royal Hungarian Air Force	6		
Harry Steere †	United Kingdom	Royal Air Force	6		(+5 shared)
Hugh Tamblyn †	Canada	Royal Air Force	6		
Raymond Thorold-Smith †	Australia	Royal Australian Air Force	6		(+1 shared)
Owen Tracey †	New Zealand	Royal Air Force	6		
Gheorghe Tutuianu	Kingdom of Romania	Royal Romanian Air Force	6		
Constantin Ursachi	Kingdom of Romania	Royal Romanian Air Force	6		
Bram van der Stok	Netherlands	Royal Netherlands Air Force; Royal Air Force	6		
Remy Van Lierde	Belgium	Royal Air Force	6		(+44 V-1 flying bombs)
Ioan Vornica	Kingdom of Romania	Royal Romanian Air Force	6		
Ralph Wandrey	United States	U.S. Army Air Forces	6		49th FG, 9th Fighter Squadron, PTO
James Henry Whalen †	Canada	Royal Canadian Air Force	6		
William E. Whalen	United States	U.S. Army Air Forces	6		(+2 ground kills)
Lynn E. Witt, Jr.	United States	U.S. Army Air Forces	6		
Yue Yi-Chin / Yue Yiqin	China	Chinese Nationalist Air Force	6		
Yoshio Yoshida	Japan	Imperial Japanese Army	6	(+1 probable)	
