= R. H. Anderson =

R. H. Anderson may refer to the following people:

- Robert Henry Anderson, botanist
- Richard H. Anderson (general), Confederate general
- Robert H. Anderson (officer), Confederate general
- Rob Anderson (politician), Canadian politician
- Robert H. Anderson (politician), American politician
- Richard H. Anderson (pilot), United States Air Force pilot in World War II
- Richard H. Anderson (businessman), American lawyer and airline executive

== See also ==
- Anderson (surname)
- Richard Anderson (disambiguation)
- Robert Anderson (disambiguation)
