= Carl Brown =

Carl Brown may refer to:

- Carl Brown (discus thrower) (born 1970), American discus thrower
- Carl Robert Brown (1930–1982), American teacher and mass murderer
- Carl Brown (footballer) (born 1950), Jamaican football player and manager
- L. Carl Brown (1928–2020), American professor of history
- Carl A. Brown Jr. (1917–1998), United States Navy fighter ace

== See also ==
- Karl Brown (disambiguation)
