= Ernest Shipman (pilot) =

WWII Ace Fighter Pilot

Major Ernest Shipman
- Born: Ernest Shipman; April 6, 1923; Jackson Heights, Long Island, New York
- Education: Columbia College, New York
- Military career
- Allegiance: United States
- Branch: U.S. Army Air Force
- Service years: 1944-1957
- Rank: Major
- Nickname: Ernie
- Unit: 307th FS 31st FG
- Awards: Congressional Gold Medal; Air Force Longevity Service Award with 4 oak leaf clusters; Air Medal with 11 oak leaf clusters (2 silver, 1 bronze); American Campaign Medal; American Defense Medal; Armed Forces Reserve Medal; Distinguished Flying Cross; National Defense Service Medal; Prisoner of War Medal; Silver Star; World War II Victory Medal; Air Force Commendation Medal; European-African-Middle Eastern Campaign Medal with 4 bronze stars

Maj Ernest Shipman U.S. Army Air Force (April 6, 1923 - ) from Saginaw, Michigan was an American World War II Ace pilot who shot down seven aircraft in the Mediterranean theatre of World War II.

== Career ==
P-51D 44-13510 MX-A ''Angel III'' 307th FS

On May 5, 1944, Shipman shot down his first enemy aircraft: an Italian Air Force Fiat G50 over Ploesti, Romania. On June 13, 1944, he shot down a Me-210 twin engine over Landshut, Austria. He shot down several more planes in June and July 1944, and reached Ace status on July 21, 1944, when he destroyed an Bf 109 over Budapest. Shipman was flying a P-51 when he was shot down on July 30, 1944, Budapest by a P-38 and captured. He became a prisoner of was until the end of World War II.

After the war he earned a Bachelor's degree (1948) and Master's degree from Columbia College, New York (1950). Shipman stayed in service with the New York Air National Guard until he retired as a Major in 1957.

== Awards ==
- Air Force Longevity Service Award with 4 oak leaf clusters
- Air Medal with 11 oak leaf clusters (2 silver, 1 bronze)
- American Campaign Medal
- American Defense Medal
- Armed Forces Reserve Medal
- Congressional Gold Medal (2015)
- Distinguished Flying Cross
- National Defense Service Medal
- Prisoner of War Medal
- Silver Star (Note: His Silver Star citation cites his bravery as a fighter pilot of the 307th Squadron. His in air combat without regard for his own life.)
- World War II Victory Medal
- Air Force Commendation Medal
- European-African-Middle Eastern Campaign Medal with 4 bronze stars

== See also ==
- List of World War II aces from the United States
- List of World War II flying aces
