= Ernest C. Fiebelkorn =

WWII and Korean War Ace Pilot

Ernest Charles Fiebelkorn
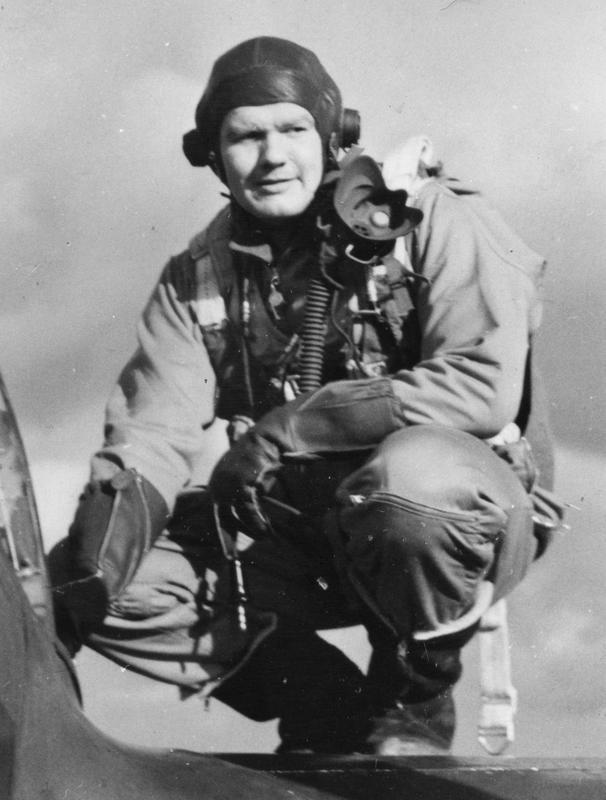
- Born: December 12, 1922; Pontiac, Michigan, U.S.
- Died: July 6, 1950 (aged 27); Chongmong-ni, Gapyeong County, Gyeonggi, Korean Peninsula (now South Korea)
- Burial place: Arlington National Cemetery
- Relatives: June Allyn (wife)
- Military career
- Allegiance: United States of America
- Branch: United States Army Air Forces (1942-1947); United States Air Force (1947-1950)
- Service years: 1942–1950
- Rank: Major
- Nicknames: "Red", "Feeb"
- Units: 77th Fighter Squadron, 20th Fighter Group; 4th Fighter Squadron, 51st Fighter Group
- Conflicts: World War II; Korean War
- Awards: Silver Star (2); Distinguished Flying Cross (3); Purple Heart; Air Medal (6)

Ernest Charles Fiebelkorn (December 12, 1922 – July 6, 1950) was a United States Army Air Force fighter ace who was credited with shooting down 9 aircraft during World War II, making him the highest scoring fighter ace of the 20th Fighter Group. He was killed in action in 1950, during the Korean War.

== Early life ==
A grandson of German immigrants, he grew up in Lake Orion, Michigan and his father died when he was 14 years old, leaving Fiebelkorn and his four siblings to be raised by their mother. His mother did not allow him to join the U.S. Army Air Forces and instead she encouraged him to go to college. In 1941 he attended Michigan State College.

== Military career ==
In May 1942, he left college and promptly enlisted in the reserves of the U.S. Army Air Corps on May 21, 1942, and entered the Aviation Cadet Program of the U.S. Army Air Forces on November 8, 1942. Fiebelkorn was commissioned a second lieutenant and awarded his pilot wings at Williams Army Air Field, Arizona, on August 30, 1943.

=== World War II ===
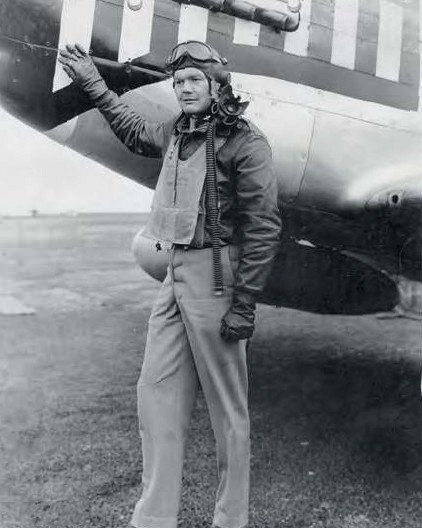
Fiebelkorn with his P-51D 'June Nite'

After completing P-38 Lightning training, he was assigned to the 79th and then the 77th Fighter Squadron of the 20th Fighter Group in the European Theater of Operations, in January 1944. Flying missions from RAF Kings Cliffe, he was promoted to first lieutenant in May 1944. He was credited with a shared aerial victory of a Focke-Wulf Fw 190 over Reims, France on July 14, 1944.

In July 1944, the 20th FG converted to P-51 Mustangs. Fiebelkorn shot down a Messerschmitt Bf 109 over Hamburg, Germany on August 5, his first solo victory. On September 28, Fiebelkorn shot down three Bf 109s and one Fw 190 over Magdeburg. For his actions, he was awarded the Silver Star. On October 6, he was sent to London to participate, alongside Countess Mountbatten on a radio broadcast of the American Broadcasting System, where he recounted his experiences in combat.

On November 2, during a bomber escort mission over Leipzig, Germany, he shot down three Bf 109s and was awarded a second Silver Star for the mission. On November 8, he shared in the destruction of a jet-powered Me 262, along with 1st Lieutenant Edward "Buddy" Haydon of the 357th Fighter Group. It was later discovered that the Me 262 had been piloted by German flying ace Major Walter Nowotny, who was credited with 258 aerial victories and was commander of Jagdgeschwader 7, the first operational jet fighter unit in the world.

During World War II, Fiebelkorn was credited with destroying 9 enemy aircraft in aerial combat plus 1 damaged, as well as 2 enemy aircraft on the ground while strafing enemy airfields. His younger brother Roger was killed in action during the war while serving with the 100th Infantry Division in France.

While serving with the 20th FG, he flew P-38J and P-51D bearing the name "June Nite", which were named after his wife June.

=== Post-war and Korea ===
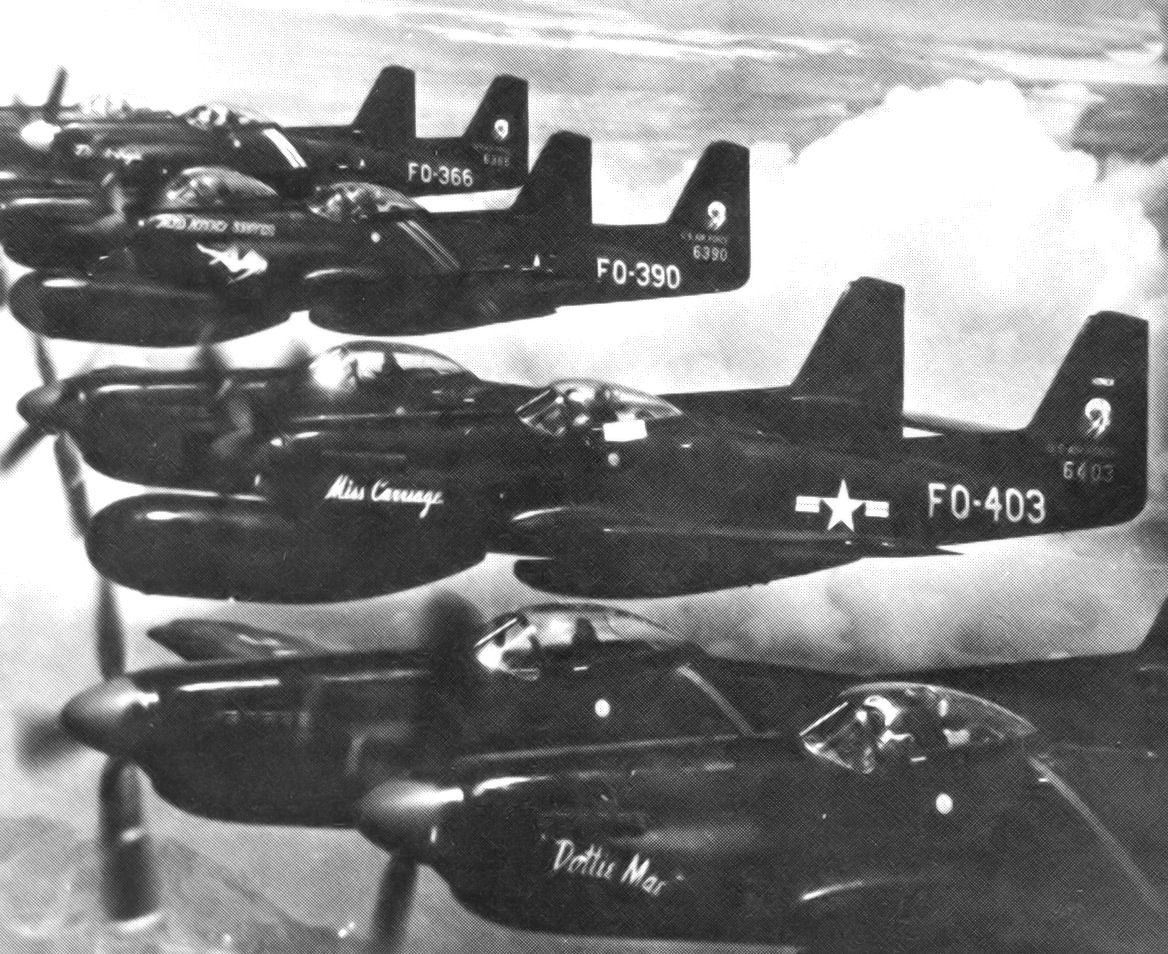
The type of plane that Fiebelkorn was flying when he crashed near Suwon-Seoul area, Korea. Photo shows a flight of 339th FS F-82Gs heading to Korea in June 1950.

After returning to the United States, Fiebelkorn served in airfields in California, Arizona, Washington and Oregon, from February 1945 until he left active duty on February 9, 1947.

He was recalled to active duty with the U.S. Air Force on December 2, 1947, and served with the 2nd Fighter Squadron of the 52nd Fighter Group at Mitchel Field, New York, from December 1947 to December 1948. Fiebelkorn was next assigned to the 82d Fighter Squadron at Hamilton Air Force Base, California, where he served from December 1948 to February 1949.

Fiebelkorn joined the 4th Fighter Squadron of the 51st Fighter Group at Naha Air Base, Japan, in April 1949. Following the outbreak of the Korean War in June 1950, he began flying missions in the F-82 Twin Mustang. On July 6, 1950, Fiebelkorn was flying as part of a four-ship element sent to locate and strafe advancing enemy ground forces through heavy low overcast at the Suwon-Seoul area. After hours of searching with no results, he reported that he was going to descend lower in the mountainous terrain hoping to find an opening in the dense cloud cover. Fiebelkorn and his radar operator Captain John J. Higgins were listed MIA when they failed to return to base.

In 1953, Fiebelkorn and Higgins' remains were found by UN troops on a mountainside approximately 40 miles north of Seoul. Fiebelkorn was buried with full military honors at Arlington National Cemetery. He was also posthumously awarded a third Distinguished Flying Cross with Valor device. Fiebelkorn was survived by his wife June and son Eric.

== Aerial victory credits ==
| Date | # | Type | Location | Aircraft flown | Unit Assigned |
|---|---|---|---|---|---|
| July 14, 1944 | 0.5 | Focke-Wulf Fw 190 | Reims, France | P-38J Lightning | 77 FS, 20 FG |
| August 5, 1944 | 1 | Messerschmitt Bf 109 | Hamburg, Germany | P-51D Mustang | 77 FS, 20 FG |
| September 28, 1944 | 3 | Bf 109 | Magdeburg, Germany | P-51D Mustang | 77 FS, 20 FG |
| September 28, 1944 | 1 | Fw 190 | Magdeburg, Germany | P-51D Mustang | 77 FS, 20 FG |
| November 2, 1944 | 3 | Bf 109 | Leipzig, Germany | P-51D Mustang | 77 FS, 20 FG |
| November 8, 1944 | 0.5 | Messerschmitt Me 262 | Dümmer Lake, Germany | P-51D Mustang | 77 FS, 20 FG |

SOURCES: Air Force Historical Study 85: USAF Credits for the Destruction of Enemy Aircraft, World War II

== Awards and decorations ==
His awards include:

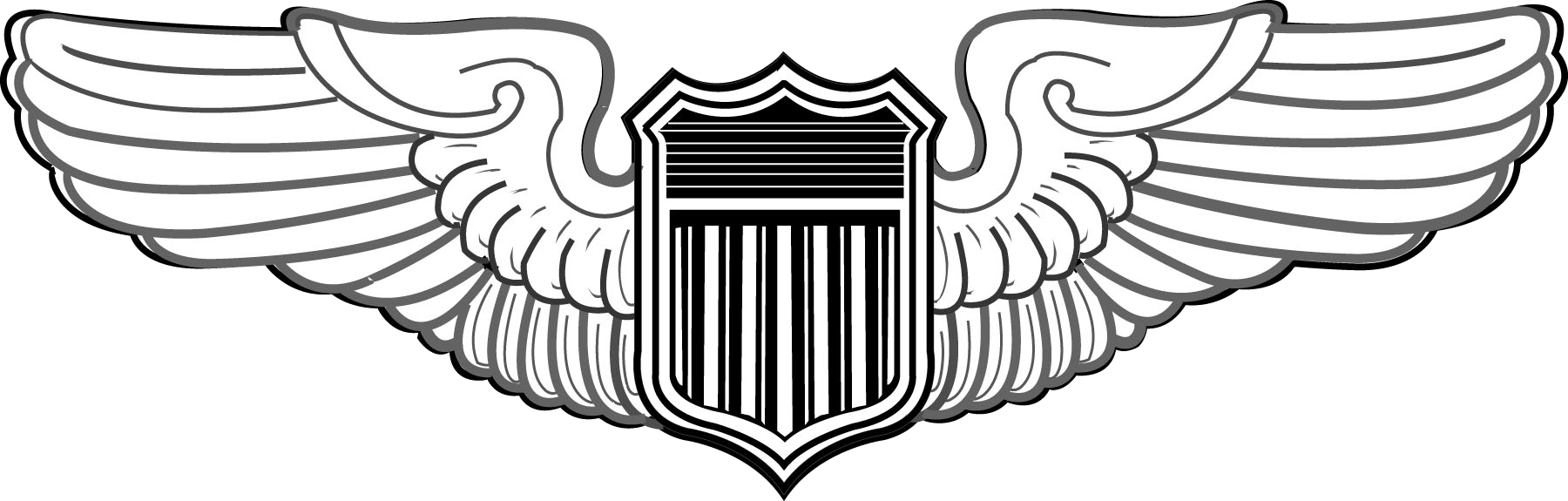
USAF Pilot Badge
| Silver Star with bronze oak leaf cluster |
| Distinguished Flying Cross with 'V' device and two bronze oak leaf clusters (Note: His third flying Cross citation states he displayed heroism in aerial combat while at the controls of an F-82 July 6, 1950. His mission was to strafe enemy tanks which had breached the line. He had to fly under the poor weather and attempt to engage the enemy. He and his aircraft went missing on the mission.) |
| Purple Heart |
| Air Medal with silver oak leaf cluster |
| Air Force Presidential Unit Citation |
| American Campaign Medal |
| European-African-Middle Eastern Campaign Medal with four bronze campaign stars |
| World War II Victory Medal |
| Army of Occupation Medal with 'Japan' clasp |
| National Defense Service Medal |
| Korean Service Medal |
| Air Force Longevity Service Award |
| French Croix de Guerre with silver star |
| Republic of Korea Presidential Unit Citation |
| United Nations Service Medal for Korea |
| Korean War Service Medal (Note: In 2000 this award was made retroactive to all U.S. military personnel who served in the Korean War.) |

- Congressional Gold Medal (2015)

== See also ==
- List of World War II aces from the United States
- List of World War II flying aces
