= Frank B. Baldwin =

WWII Ace US Marine Pilot

Major Frank B. Baldwin
- Frank B. Baldwin
- Born: Frank Bernard Baldwin; February 20, 1920; Flint, Michigan
- Died: April 17, 2004 (aged 84); Akron, Ohio
- Burial place: Rose Hill Burial Park, Ohio
- Spouse: Margaret "Reb"
- Relatives: 4 children
- Military career
- Allegiance: United States
- Branch: United States Marine Corps
- Service years: 1942-1950
- Rank: Major
- Nickname: Yank
- Unit: Marine Fighting Squadron 221
- Commands: Commander South Pacific
- Awards: Congressional Gold Medal; Distinguished Flying Cross; 6 Air Medals; Purple Heart; Navy Cross

Mjr Frank Bernard Baldwin (February 20, 1920 – April 17, 2004) from Pittsburg, Michigan was a United States Marine Corps World War II Ace pilot who shot down 10 enemy aircraft in combat. He was the recipient of the Distinguished Flying Cross.

== Career ==
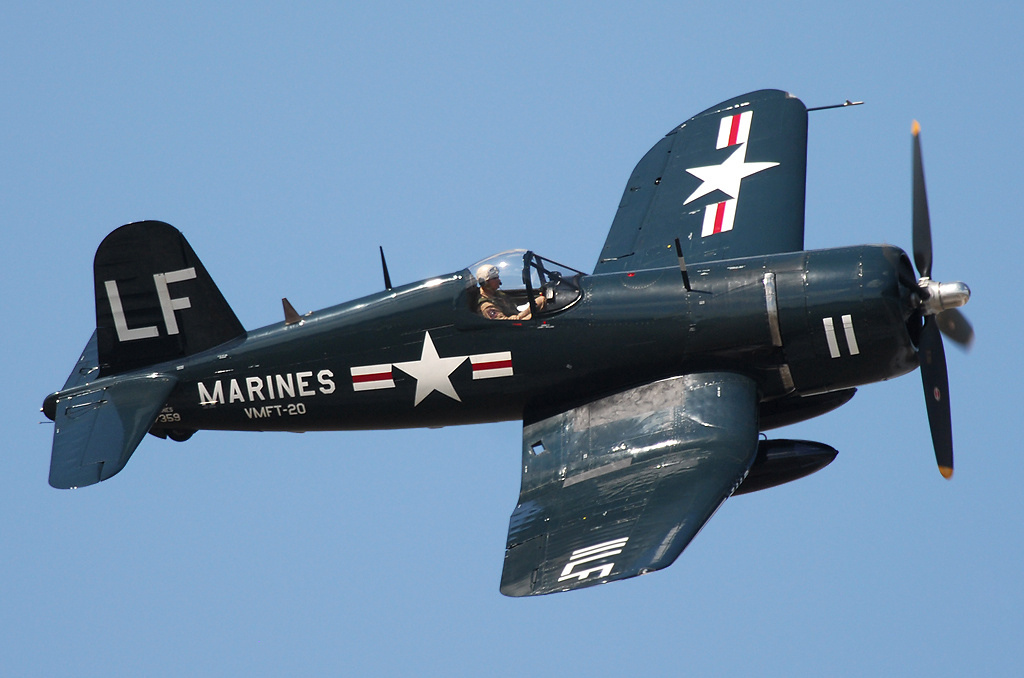
F4U Corsair: The type of plane that Baldwin was flying when he earned his Distinguished Cross Medal escorting B-25 bombers.

Baldwin enlisted in 1942 and flew in over 186 missions in the Pacific Theatre of World War II. In one reconnaissance mission over Kyushu April 6, 1944, Baldwin shot down four Japanese enemy aircraft.

== Awards ==
- 6 Air Medals
- Congressional Gold Medal (2015)
- Distinguished Flying Cross (Note: His Distinguished Flying cross citation cites his bravery in leading a mission escorting B-25 bombers to bomb Buka and Bonis airfields. The bombers destroyed 21 of the 25 aircraft on the ground. Baldwin flew his aircraft through flak and managed to shoot down an enemy Japanese plane. The mission also succeeded in destroying two enemy ships, and 2 barges.)
- Purple Heart
- Navy Cross
- United States Marine corps Hall of Fame

== Death ==
In 2004 Baldwin died in Hospice after struggling with cancer for several years.

== See also ==
- List of World War II aces from the United States
- List of World War II flying aces
