= David Thwaites (flying ace) =

David F. Thwaites
- Born: September 8, 1921; Conshohocken, Pennsylvania
- Died: December 15, 2015 (aged 94); Annapolis, Maryland
- Military career
- Allegiance: United States
- Branch: United States Army Air Forces; United States Air Force
- Service years: 1939–1965
- Rank: Lieutenant colonel
- Nickname: Frank
- Conflicts: World War II
- Awards: Distinguished Flying Cross (3); Air Medal (4)

David Franklin Thwaites (September 8, 1921 – December 15, 2015) was a fighter pilot and flying ace of the United States Army Air Forces during World War II. He became an ace piloting the P-47 Thunderbolt as a member of the 361st Fighter Squadron of the 356th Fighter Group. Thwaites, based out of RAF Martlesham Heath in England, was the second highest scoring pilot in his squadron with six confirmed victories, and the only pilot of the 356th FG to score all of his victories while serving with the group. He scored his victories using three different P-47s, however, he nicknamed them all Polly. Following the completion of his tour in September 1944, he returned to the United States and became an instructor.

Following the surrender of Germany, Thwaites was stationed in Germany and on August 19, 1946, while a member of the 396th Fighter Squadron/368th Fighter Group, his P-47 Thunderbolt was involved in an aerial collision in the vicinity of Borkum.

== See also ==
- List of United States Air Force squadrons
- List of World War II aces from United States
