= Karl Brown =

Karl Brown may refer to:

- Karl Brown (cricketer) (born 1988), English cricketer
- Karl Brown (cinematographer) (1896–1990), pioneer American cinematographer
- Karl Brown, member of the 1980s music group Automatic Pilot
- Karl 'Tuff Enuff' Brown, UK garage DJ from Double Trouble and Tuff Jam

== See also ==
- Carl Brown (disambiguation)
