= Norman E. Olson =

WWII Ace Fighter Pilot

Captain Norman E. Olson
- Born: Norman E. Olson; March 19, 1915; Winnipeg, Canada
- Died: April 8, 1944 (aged 29)
- Burial place: Fort Snelling National Cemetery, Minneapolis, Minnesota
- Spouse: Frances
- Military career
- Allegiance: United States
- Branch: U.S. Army Air Force
- Rank: Captain
- Units: 355th Fighter Group *357th Fighter Squadron
- Awards: Air Medal; American Campaign Medal; Army Good Conduct Medal; Congressional Gold Medal; Distinguished Flying Cross for extraordinary achievement; European-African-Middle Eastern Campaign; Army Presidential Unit Citation; Purple Heart; United States Aviator Badge Army; World War II Victory Medal

Norman E. Olson (March 19, 1915 – April 8, 1944) was a U.S. Army Air Forces World War II flying ace. He shot down seven enemy aircraft in the European theatre of World War II. Olson died in aerial combat on April 8, 1944. He was the first Ace pilot of the 355th Fighter Group.

== Early life ==
He was born in Winnipeg, Canada and lived in Fargo, North Dakota. He graduated from Fargo High School. He spent two years in Milwaukee, Wisconsin attending Marquette university. Before moving to Fargo, Olson spent time as a commercial photographer in Eau Claire, Wisconsin. In 1941 Olson enlisted in the United States Army.

== Career ==
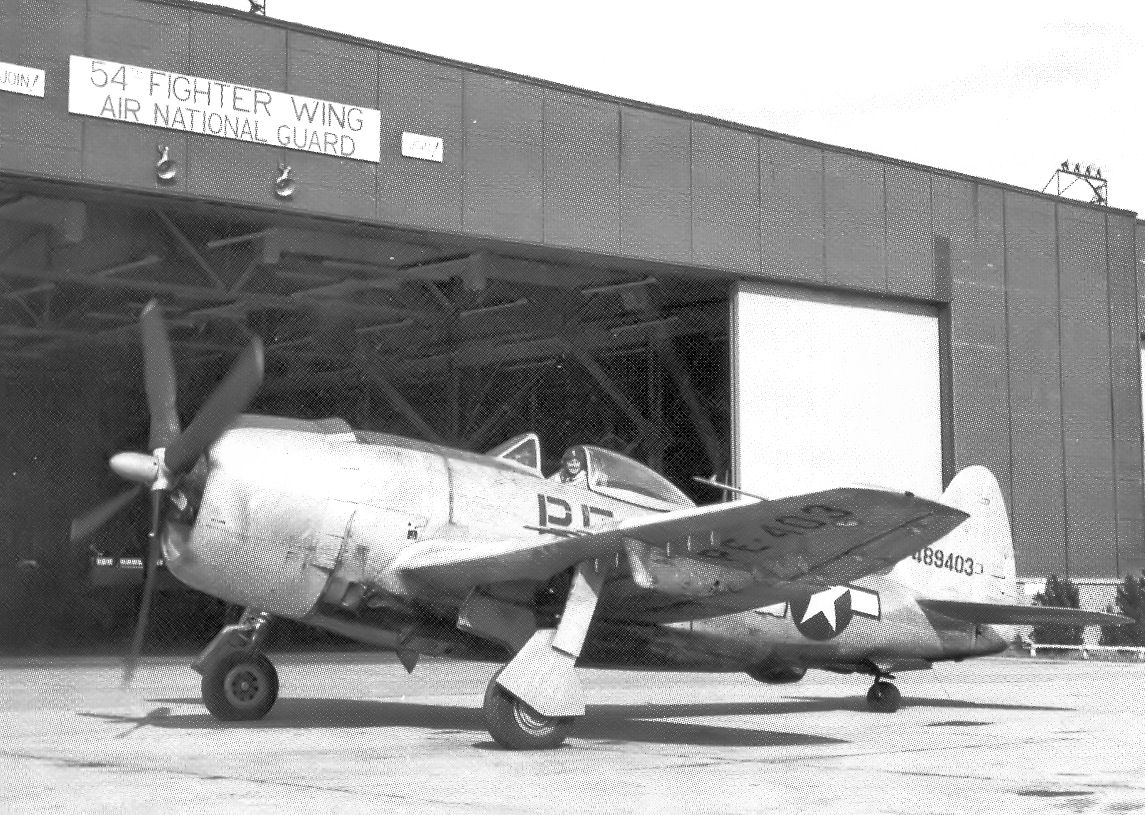
Olson flew a P-47N Thunderbolt during his time in WWII. The P-47N Thunderbolt was primarily used in the Pacific Theatre.

Olson enlisted in the Army in 1941 and was stationed in Europe in 1943. Olson was flying a P-47 when he destroyed an enemy aircraft Bf 109 in aerial combat over Siegen on February 20, 1944. Olson and his unit were returning from a mission over a Nazi airdome Brunswick, Germany, when Olson was shot down by ground fire. The other fighters in Olson's unit only made one pass, but Olson made three.

== Awards ==
- Air Medal
- American Campaign Medal
- Army Good Conduct Medal
- Congressional Gold Medal (2015)
- Distinguished Flying Cross for extraordinary achievement (Note: His flying Cross citation was given for his aerial combat as a fighter pilot in the 357th.)
- European-African-Middle Eastern Campaign
- Army Presidential Unit Citation
- Purple Heart
- United States Aviator Badge Army
- World War II Victory Medal

== See also ==
- List of World War II aces from the United States
- List of World War II flying aces
