= Theodore H. Winters Jr. =

Navy captain

Theodore Hugh Winters Jr.
- Born: March 11, 1913; Society Hill, South Carolina, U.S.
- Died: April 25, 2008 (aged 95) Lynchburg, Virginia, U.S.
- Buried: Arlington National Cemetery
- Allegiance: United States of America
- Branch: United States Navy
- Service years: 1935–1961
- Rank: Captain
- Conflicts: World War II: Operation Torch; Battle of Leyte Gulf
- Awards: Navy Cross (2); Silver Star (3); Distinguished Flying Cross; Air Medal; Purple Heart

Theodore Hugh Winters Jr. (March 11, 1913 – April 25, 2008) was a highly decorated United States Navy captain. He was a flying ace credited with eight aerial victories and was awarded two Navy Crosses during the battle of Leyte Gulf in World War II.

== Early life and career ==
Theodore H. Winters was born on March 11, 1913, in Society Hill, South Carolina. Upon graduating high school in 1931, Winters entered the United States Naval Academy at Annapolis, Maryland. On June 6, 1935, he graduated from the academy and was commissioned as an ensign in the Navy.

Ensign Winters was assigned to the USS Pennsylvania for one year as a gunnery officer, followed by one year aboard the USS Hamilton as a gunnery and communications officer. In June 1937, Winters was sent to Naval Air Station Pensacola, Florida, where he attended flight training. The following June, Lieutenant Junior Grade Winters graduated from the course and was designated as a Naval aviator. Winters was assigned to VB-5 aboard the USS Yorktown until June 1940. He then returned to Pensacola where he served as a flight instructor.

== World War II ==
From February to March 1942, Lieutenant Winters was assigned to the seaplane tender USS Matagorda. Afterwards, he was attached to Fighting Squadron 9 (VF-9) as the executive officer aboard the USS Ranger.

=== North Africa ===
In November 1942, Lieutenant Commander Winters took part in Operation Torch in French Morocco. In one day, he led three combat missions, destroying 14 Vichy French bombers on the ground at Rabat-Sale Airdrome, followed by destroying more enemy planes at Port Lyautey and then attacking an enemy position at El Hank.

Although his aircraft was hit by enemy fire and he was wounded, Winters continued to lead his men throughout the next few days and destroyed 20 planes on the ground at Médiouna Airdrome. He then bombed enemy vehicles at Fedala and then attacked enemy destroyers in Casablanca Harbor. For his actions during the operation, Lieutenant Commander Winters was awarded his first Silver Star.

=== Pacific War ===
Winters and his squadron returned to the United States by the end of November. In April 1943, VF-9 was attached to the USS Essex and set out for the Pacific. By August 1943, Winters was promoted to commander and was made the commanding officer of Fighting Squadron 19 (VF-19) aboard the USS Lexington.

By September 1944, VF-19 and other squadrons were flying combat missions over the Philippines in preparation for the invasion in October. On September 12, Commander Winters shot down three Japanese planes. Winters claimed ace status and was awarded a second Silver Star by mid-October, shooting down three more enemy aircraft and probably downing a fourth.

On October 24, during the battle of Leyte Gulf, Commander Winters led his squadron through a barrage of anti-aircraft fire to inflict severe damage on two Japanese battleships and four cruisers. The next day, Winters continued leading his planes through barrages of anti-aircraft fire even though his own plane was damaged. His squadron assisted in the sinking of one fleet carrier and two light carriers. Commander Winters was awarded two Navy Crosses during this two day period.

On November 5, Commander Winters again led his squadron in attacking a Japanese cruiser and a destroyer in Manila Bay. Upon assisting in sinking the two ships, Winters shot down an enemy aircraft. Winters was awarded his third Silver Star and finished the war with a total of eight aerial victories.

== Post-war career ==
In January 1945, Winters was assigned to the training unit at Naval Air Station Jacksonville, Florida. He would stay there until the summer of 1947, when he attended the Armed Forces Staff College in Norfolk, Virginia. Upon graduating in January 1948, he was attached to the USS Midway. From July 1949 to February 1951, Winters was assigned as a faculty member at the Naval Academy, followed by an assignment aboard the USS Franklin D. Roosevelt.

He began attending the Naval War College in Newport, Rhode Island, in July 1953, graduating in February 1954. From 1959 to 1960, he served as the commanding officer of the USS Franklin D. Roosevelt. Captain Winters retired from the Navy on July 1, 1961.

Theodore H. Winters died from a stroke on April 25, 2008, in Lynchburg, Virginia. He was buried in Arlington National Cemetery.

== Awards and decorations ==
CAPT Winters' awards include the following:

| Badge | U.S. Naval Aviator Badge | | |
| 1st Row | Navy Cross with 1 5/16 gold inch star (2 awards) | Silver Star with 2 5/16 gold inch stars (3 awards) | Distinguished Flying Cross |
| 2nd Row | Purple Heart | Air Medal | U.S. Navy Presidential Unit Citation with 1 Service star |
| 3rd Row | American Defense Service Medal with 1 Campaign star | American Campaign Medal | European-African-Middle Eastern Campaign Medal with 1 Campaign star |
| 4th Row | Asiatic-Pacific Campaign Medal with 4 Campaign stars | World War II Victory Medal | Army of Occupation Medal |
| 5th Row | National Defense Service Medal with 1 Service star | Philippine Republic Presidential Unit Citation | Philippine Liberation Medal with 1 Campaign star |
