= Clayton Kelly Gross =

American World War II flying ace

- Clayton Kelly Gross 1944 in his P-51 "Live Bait"
- Born: Clayton Kelly Gross; November 30, 1920; Walla Walla, Washington
- Died: January 10, 2016 (aged 95); Sparks, Nevada
- Relatives: Wife: Ramona
- Military career
- Allegiance: United States
- Branch: Army Air Forces Corps
- Service years: 1941-1945
- Rank: Captain
- Nickname: "Kelly"
- Unit: 354th Fighter Group
- Conflicts: D-Day
- Awards: Congressional Gold Medal; Distinguished Flying Cross; Silver Star

Clayton Kelly Gross (November 30, 1920 – January 10, 2016), from Walla Walla, Washington, was an Army Air Forces World War II Ace who shot down 6 enemy planes over Europe. Gross also flew planes in the D-Day invasion of Normandy, France both on June 5 and 6, 1944. He was a recipient of the American Fighter Aces Congressional Gold Medal, the Distinguished Flying Cross and the Silver Star. He flew in 105 combat missions during WWII.

== Education ==
- Lewis & Clark High School (1938)
- Gonzaga Prep (1938–1941)
- Aviation Cadet January (1941–1942)
- University of Southern California and Loyola University, B. S. 1954
- University of Oregon, D.M.D. 1958

== Career ==
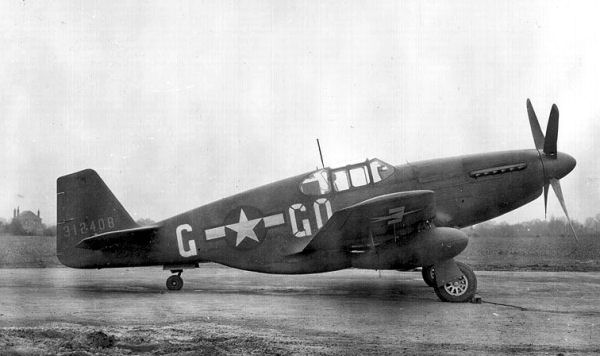
Photo of a WWII P-51 from the 354th Fighter Group

In 1941, Clayton Kelly Gross was a 20-year-old aviation cadet with the Army Air Forces. He received his commission and the rank of second lieutenant in September 1942.

In 1943 Gross was assigned to the 354th Fighter Group and began flying P-51 Mustangs. from Britain. He became an ace with six confirmed aerial kills, including a jet-powered Me 262.

== D-Day ==
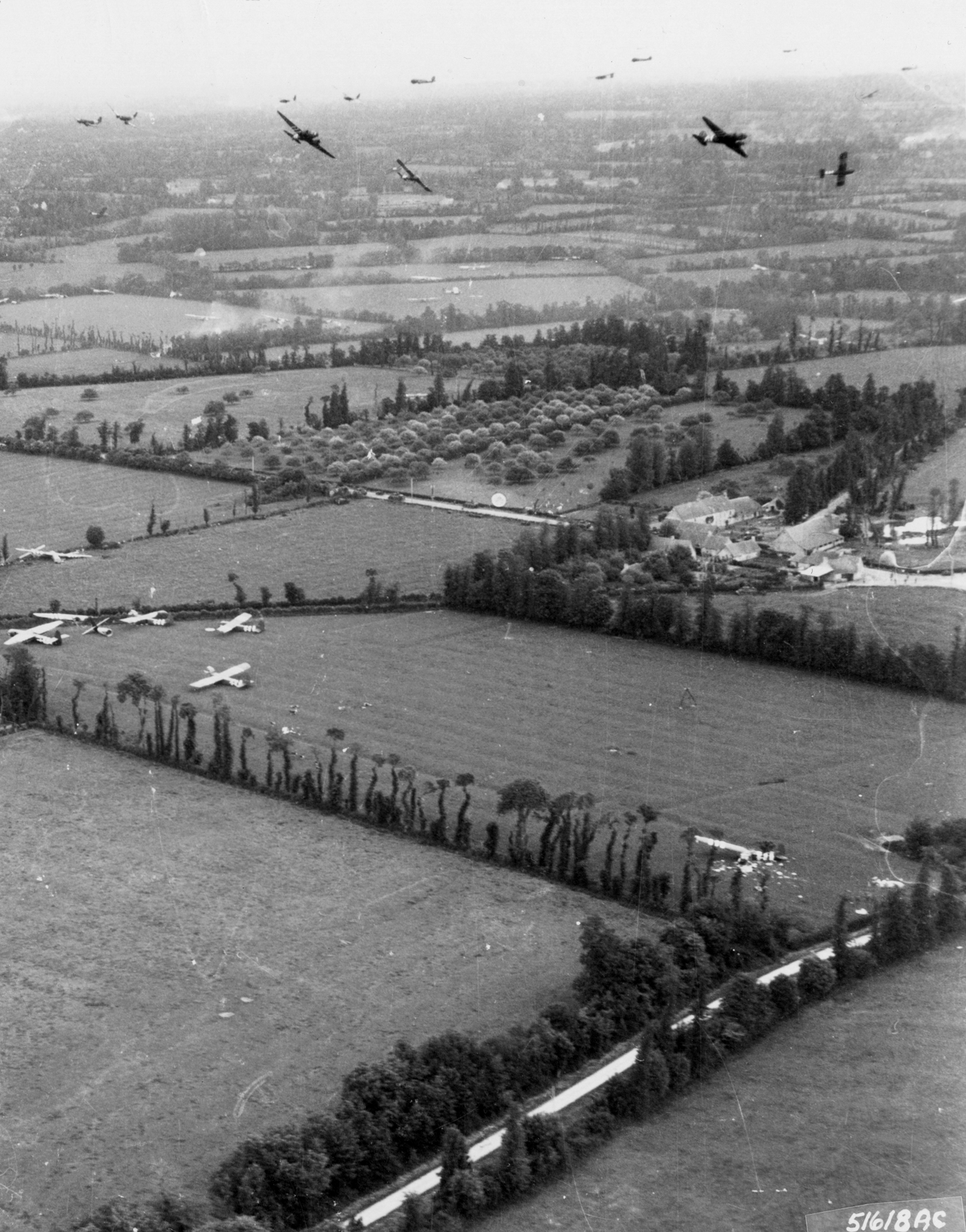
US glider reinforcements arrive on D-Day 1944.

On the night of June 5, 1944, the night before the D-Day Invasion of France, Gross participated in a secret mission escorting gliders behind enemy lines at Normandy, France. On June 6, 1944, the date of D-Day, Gross flew a P-51 Mustang he named "Live Bait". His superior told him to fly low and attract enemy fire. Gross joked that he would be live bait.

In 1944 Gross was on a bombing mission over Berlin when he engaged Bf 109. An allied P-47 Accidentally shot Gross's P-51 and the 50 caliber bullet pushed the back of the cockpit into Gross's head. He flew 105 combat missions.

In 2006 he wrote and published his memoirs entitled: Live Bait: WWII Memoirs of an "Undefeated Fighter Ace".

In 2014 Gross was one of a handful of Aces who attended a White House ceremony with President Barack Obama to sign the H.R. 685, the American Fighter Aces Congressional Gold Medal Act, into law.

== Affiliations ==
- President of the American Fighter Aces Association (2015)

== Awards ==
- Congressional Gold Medal (2015)
- Silver Star (Note: "Silver Star for gallantry in action against the enemy as a P-51 Mustang Fighter Pilot of the 355th Fighter Squadron, 354th Fighter Group, NINTH Air Force, in action against the enemy in aerial combat in the European Theater of Operations during World War II. His gallant actions and dedicated devotion to duty, without regard for his own life, were in keeping with the highest traditions of military service and reflect great credit upon himself, his unit, and the United States Army Air Forces.")
- Distinguished Flying Cross
- Air Medal
- Distinguished Units Citation

== Personal ==
Gross was born in Walla Walla, Washington, on Jan. 20, 1920, and he attended high school and was raised in Spokane, Washington. His first wife was named Gwendolyn Yeo, and together they had two children—a son, Mike; and a daughter, Mary. After Gwen's death, Gross married Ramona Bettendorf. Gross was a career dentist in Vancouver, Washington. He retired in 1998. He died in Sparks, Nevada, on Jan. 10, 2016.

== See also ==
- List of World War II aces from the United States
- List of World War II flying aces

== Bibliography ==
- Gross, Kelly (2006). Live Bait: WWII Memoirs of an "Undefeated Fighter Ace". Fallbrook, California: Inkwater Press. ISBN 978-1592991860.
