= Fred R. Haviland Jr. =

American flying ace (1922–2008)

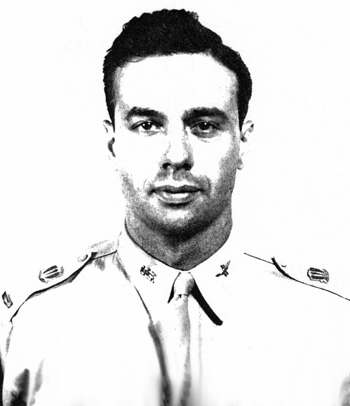
- Born: March 24, 1915; Tampa, Florida, U.S.
- Died: March 17, 1989 (aged 73); Winter Park, Florida, U.S.
- Burial place: Orange Grove Cemetery; Lake Charles, Louisiana, U.S.
- Military career
- Allegiance: United States of America
- Branch: United States Army Air Forces
- Service years: 1941–1945
- Rank: Major
- Units: 357th Fighter Squadron, 355th Fighter Group
- Conflicts: World War II
- Awards: Distinguished Flying Cross (5); Air Medal (7)

Fred Russ Haviland Jr. (March 24, 1915 – March 17, 1989) was an American flying ace in the 355th Fighter Group during World War II, who was credited with 6 aerial victories.

== Early life ==
Haviland was born in 1915 in Tampa.

== Military career ==
On November 5, 1941, he entered the Aviation Cadet Program of the U.S. Army Air Forces and on May 20, 1942, he was commissioned a second lieutenant and awarded his pilot wings on May 20, 1942.

=== World War II ===
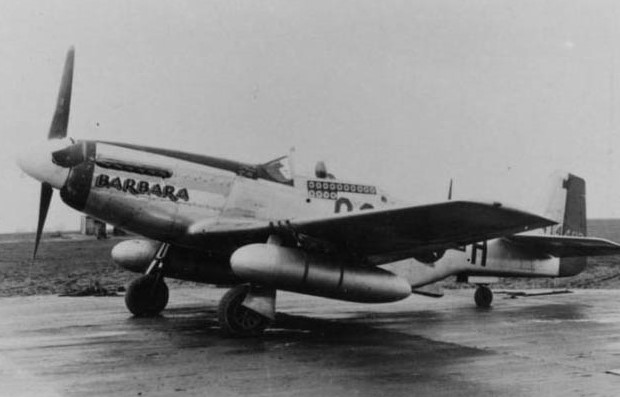
Haviland's P-51D Mustang 'Barbara'

After receiving his pilot wings, he was assigned as an instructor pilot with the Army Air Forces Training Command from 1942 to 1943. After completing his training in the North American P-51 Mustang, he was deployed as a P-51 pilot with 357th Fighter Squadron of the 355th Fighter Group in RAF Steeple Morden in England, in May 1944. Flying missions in the European theater of World War II, he was credited with his first aerial victory, when he shot a Messerschmitt Bf 109 north of Magdeburg, Germany on June 21, 1944. On June 24, he received his first Distinguished Flying Cross, when he led a flight of P-51s to attack a German airfield in east of Angers, France, where he destroyed three aircraft on the ground and other vital ground targets.

On July 7, 1944, Haviland shot down two Messerschmitt Bf 110s, while en route to Halle, Germany and on August 3, he shot down another Fw 190, his fourth aerial victory. On September 12, he led the 357th FS in attacking a German airfield in Brüx, Czechoslovakia, where he personally destroyed three enemy aircraft on the ground. He finally became a flying ace on November 26, 1944, when he shot down a Fw 190 and Bf 109, while defending 2nd Air Division's B-24 Liberator bombers over Hanover and Gardelegen from German aerial attacks, which were also his last aerial victories of the war.

In February 1945, he was transferred to the 65th Fighter Wing, before returning to the United States on the same month. Following the end of World War II, he left active duty on August 31, 1945.

During World War II, Haviland was credited with the destruction of 6 enemy aircraft in aerial combat plus 2 damaged, and 6 destroyed plus 3 damaged on the ground while strafing enemy airfields. While serving with the 355th FG, he flew P-51s bearing the name "Barbara".

== Later life ==
After leaving military service, he worked as a lecturer and adjunct professor at Northwestern University, University of Minnesota, University of Wisconsin, Rollins College and University of Central Florida. He later worked as an executive vice president of Joseph Schlitz Brewing Company in Wisconsin. After his retirement in 1975, he resided at Winter Park, Florida. He was an Episcopalian.

He died on March 17, 1989, and was buried at Orange Grove Cemetery in Lake Charles, Louisiana.

== Aerial victory credits ==
Date	#	Type	Location	Aircraft flown	Unit Assigned
June 21, 1944	1	Messerschmitt Bf 109	Magdeburg, Germany	P-51B Mustang	357 FS, 355 FG
July 7, 1944	2	Messerschmitt Bf 110	Halle, Germany	P-51B	357 FS, 355 FG
August 3, 1944	1	Focke-Wulf Fw 190	Saarburg, Germany	P-51B	357 FS, 355 FG
November 26, 1944	1	Fw 190	Gardelegen, Germany	P-51D Mustang	357 FS, 355 FG
November 26, 1944	1	Bf 109	Gardelegen, Germany	P-51D	357 FS, 355 FG

SOURCES: Air Force Historical Study 85: USAF Credits for the Destruction of Enemy Aircraft, World War II

== Awards and decorations ==
United States Army Air Forces pilot badge
Distinguished Flying Cross with four bronze oak leaf clusters
Air Medal with silver and bronze oak leaf clusters
American Defense Service Medal
American Campaign Medal
European-African-Middle Eastern Campaign Medal with three bronze campaign stars
World War II Victory Medal
