= Carl A. Brown Jr. =

American WWII flying ace (1916–1998)

Carl Allen Brown Jr. was a United States Navy double-fighter ace during the Second World War. Born in Texarkana, Texas, he scored 10.5 aerial victories against the enemy and participated in the Battle of Leyte Gulf, where he shot down five enemy aircraft in one day, earning the title "Ace in a Day" and the Navy Cross.

== Early life ==
Brown was born on July 24, 1917, to Carl Allen Brown Sr. and Golda Allen Garner Brown. He has two siblings, an older sister named Lola Marion Brown Chiles and a younger brother named Jack Morris Brown. The Texarkana that Brown and his siblings grew up in was a railroad hub for the Cotton Belt that had a population of over 20,000 and was home to many businesses related to timber and agriculture. By the time he was in his early teenage years, Brown was interested in aviation.

== War service ==
While not clear when and where Brown entered military service, he held the rank of lieutenant by 1944. In June 1944, he served as division flight leader of the Fighter Squadron 27 (VF-27) aboard the light cruiser USS Princeton (CVL-23). Brown and his squadron participated in the Marianas operations from June 11 to June 19, where he shot down two enemy planes and strafed ground positions. He earned the Distinguished Flying Cross for his actions in these operations.

On September 21, 1944, while part of a fighter sweep over the Philippines, he destroyed another two enemy aircraft while his unit would score another eight aircraft for a total of ten. He was awarded a second Distinguished Flying Cross for his actions over the Philippines.

By October 1944, Brown had achieved the rank of Lieutenant Commander. While in command of VF 27, the Princeton would be added to Carrier Task Force 38 which was operating in the Sibuyan Sea. On the morning of October 24, the Task Force was rapidly approached by a massive Japanese strike force aimed at destroying the carrier convoy. Brown and his squad, flying F6F Hellcats, launched to intercept the fast-approaching enemy. Brown shot down five of these attacking enemy aircraft while damaging another before they could reach the Allied task force.

Later that day at roughly 0930, the Princeton came under direct attack, with VF 27 again launching against the enemy. Brown and his fighters were quickly engaged in combat directly over the Princeton when a D4Y "Judy" Dive Bomber penetrated the fighter cover and scored a direct hit on the ship. The bomb pierced the flight deck and detonated near the hangar, causing an intense fire. While the crew tried to save the vessel, a secondary explosion sealed her fate and Brown's squadron soon found themselves without a place to land. Eventually all planes in his squadron were able to land on other carriers in the task force. Brown was awarded the Navy Cross for his actions at Leyte Gulf.

Brown continued flying for the rest of the war, eventually reaching the rank of Commander. He participated in the Korean War and Vietnam War in advisory and command roles. He died on September 4, 1998, at the age of 81 and is buried at Barrancas National Cemetery at NAS Pensacola, Escambia County, Florida.
