= Richard H. Anderson (pilot) =

American Flying Ace (1921–1995)

First Lieutenant Richard Hinman Anderson (19 December 1921 – 18 March 1995) was a U.S. Army Air Force pilot who became an ace in a day. Flying Republic P-47N Thunderbolts with the 19th Fighter Squadron, 318th Fighter Group, from Ie Shima Airfield, Okinawa, he downed five Japanese fighters in a single action on 25 May 1945.

== Biography ==
Richard Hinman Anderson was born on 19 December 1921 in New York City, New York. He died on 18 March 1995 at the age of 73.

== Action ==
On 25 May 1945, Anderson, and his wingman, Second Lieutenant Donald E. Kennedy, of San Antonio, Texas, spotted 30 Mitsubishi A6M Zero fighters headed towards Okinawa at 2,000 feet, and both attacked despite odds of 15 to one.

"The first four were easy since I was on their tail," Anderson said. "I got the fifth on a deflection shot as he was turning away. When I was pressed the trigger with the sixth in my sights, I found I only had one bullet left and he got away."

"Kennedy sent three enemy planes crashing into the sea before other Thunderbolts closed in and drove off or shot down the remainder. Thunderbolts were credited with 34 planes that day," said an official announcement released on 3 June 1945.
