= Don M. Beerbower =

American World War II flying ace

Don Merril Beerbower
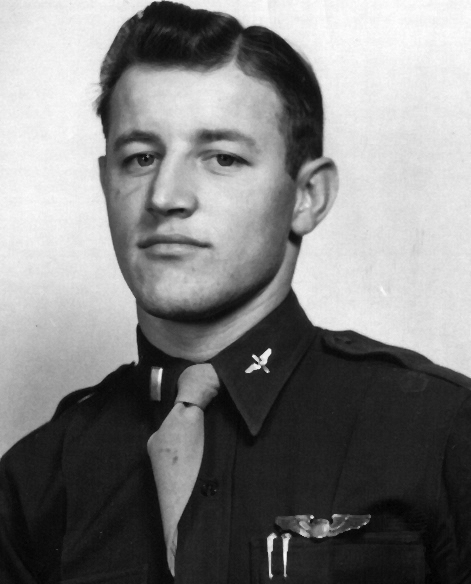
- Don Beerbower
- Born: August 26, 1921; Davidson, Saskatchewan, Canada
- Died: August 9, 1944 (aged 22); Saint-Thierry, France
- Burial place: Epinal American Cemetery and Memorial; Epinal, France
- Military career
- Allegiance: United States of America
- Branch: United States Army Air Forces
- Service years: 1942–1944
- Rank: Major
- Nickname: "Buzz”
- Units: 353rd Fighter Squadron; 354th Fighter Group
- Commands: 353rd Fighter Squadron
- Conflicts: World War II
- Awards: Distinguished Service Cross; Silver Star (2); Distinguished Flying Cross (3); Purple Heart; Air Medal (26)

Don Merrill Beerbower (August 26, 1921 – August 9, 1944) was a United States Army Air Force fighter ace who was credited with shooting down 15.5 aircraft during World War II.

== Early life ==
Beerbower was born on August 26, 1921, to Clarence W. Beerbower and Josephine F. (Carson) Beerbower in Davidson, Saskatchewan. He had two siblings, a sister named Lavaun and a brother named Darrel.

=== World War II ===
Beerbower was assigned to 353rd Fighter Squadron of the 354th Fighter Group on January 18, 1943, at Hamilton Field, California. In March 1943, Beerbower was promoted to 1st lieutenant.

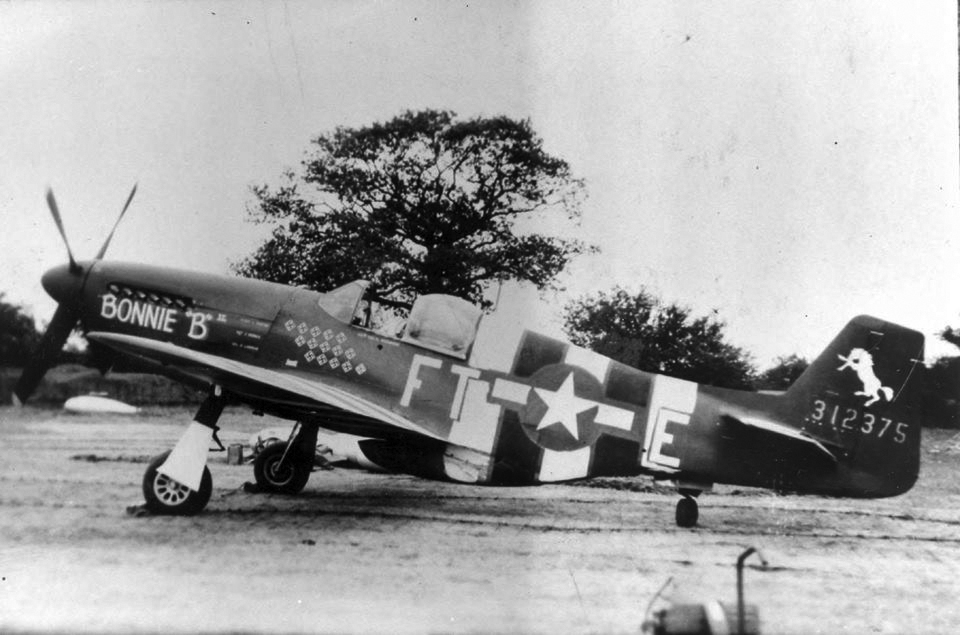
Beerbower's P-51 Mustang Bonnie B

On October 21, 1943, Beerbower left with his unit for England. They were initially stationed at RAF Greenham Common in November 1943, before moving to RAF Boxted where they flew their missions from. They flew the North American P-51B Mustangs. Beerbower flew his first combat mission on December 1, 1943, and scored his first victory, a Messerschmitt Bf 109 on January 5, 1944. Beerbower named his P-51B 'Bonnie B', in honor of his daughter, Bonnie.

Beerbower began scoring additional victories in January 1944 and was promoted to captain on January 15, 1944. He finally achieved the flying ace status on February 20, 1944, by shooting down a Bf 109, his fifth victory. On April 8, 1944, Beerbower destroyed three German planes and damaged two others out of a numerically superior force which attacked the bomber formation he was escorting.

The 354th FG moved to RAF Lashenden on April 17, 1944. Following the Invasion of Normandy in June 1944, the unit moved to Cricqueville Airfield, an Advanced Landing Ground in the Normandy region of northern France. Beerbower became a double ace on August 8, 1944, by scoring his tenth victory. He was awarded the Silver Star by Lewis H. Brereton, the commanding officer of the Ninth Air Force in ceremonies in France. Though fellow pilots were transitioning to the newer P-51D, Beerbower chose to retain his B-model as it had 4 50 cal machine guns and was lighter as a result, with better speed, climb and maneuver characteristics.

Beerbower scored his final victory, a Focke-Wulf Fw 190 on July 7, 1944, bringing his total aerial victories to 15 and 2 aircraft destroyed on ground.

== Death ==
Beerbower destroyed one enemy plane, gun emplacement and aimed for a second. On their second pass, his plane took hits in the wing and fuselage, then went into a straight vertical climb, stalled and dove straight down into the ground. Beerbower jettisoned the canopy during these maneuvers and managed to get out of the aircraft, only to hit the tail. He never opened his chute. The plane crashed and he was killed. He was posthumously awarded the Distinguished Service Cross for his final mission and the Silver Star for his April 8 mission.

Beerbower was initially buried in Temporary American Military Cemetery in Champigneul, France, before being buried at Epinal American Cemetery.

== Legacy ==
A memorial plate/marker in English and French honoring Beerbower was placed near the entrance to the village's 12th-century church, Mont d’Hor in Saint-Thierry, France in 2014. He was also inducted to the Minnesota Aviation Hall of Fame in 2000.

=== Don Beerbower Veterans Memorial Park ===
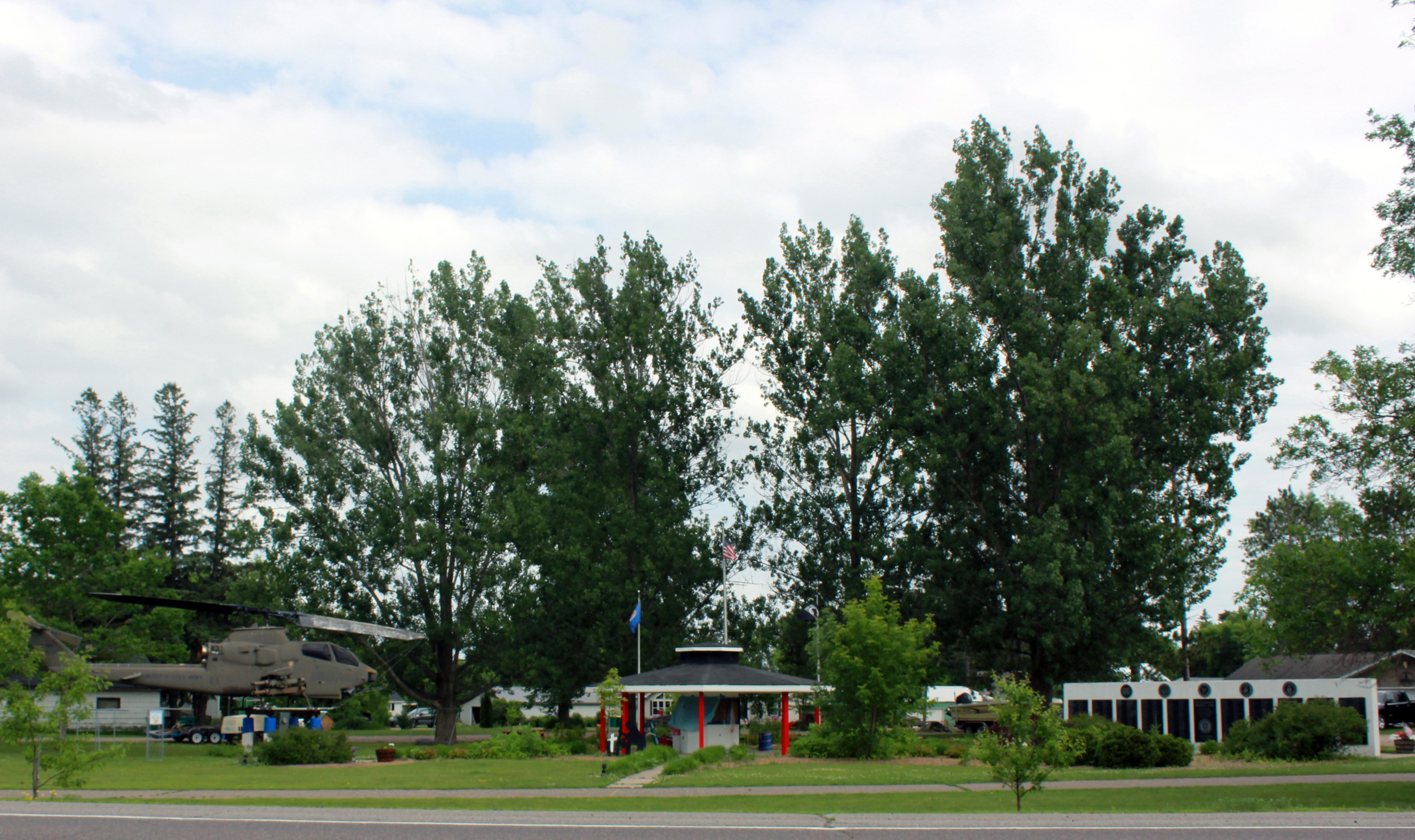
Don Beerbower Veterans Memorial Park, Hill City, MN

Don Beerbower Veterans Memorial Park, which officially opened 2004 in Hill City, Minnesota just prior to Memorial Day, is a tribute to veterans from Aiktins County resulting from years of planning and community effort. The initiative for the park originated with Hill City School students involved in the F.E.L.L.O.W.S. project, who interviewed local veterans and compiled their stories into a memorial book, while also envisioning the creation of a commemorative park. The park features public amenities such as picnic tables and a fountain, as well as military tributes including a Cobra helicopter and a memorial listing the names of Aitkin County veterans.

== Awards and decorations ==
Beerbower's decorations include:

Army Air Forces Pilot Badge
Distinguished Service Cross		Silver Star w/ 1 bronze oak leaf cluster
Distinguished Flying Cross w/ 2 bronze oak leaf cluster	Purple Heart	Air Medal w/ 4 silver oak leaf clusters
Air Medal w/ 4 bronze oak leaf clusters (second ribbon required for accouterment spacing)	American Campaign Medal	European-African-Middle Eastern Campaign Medal w/ 4 bronze campaign stars
World War II Victory Medal	Distinguished Flying Cross (United Kingdom)	Croix de Guerre with Palm (France)

Army Presidential Unit Citation

=== Distinguished Service Cross citation ===

The President of the United States of America, authorized by Act of Congress, July 9, 1918, takes pride in presenting the Distinguished Service Cross (Posthumously) to Major (Air Corps) Don Merril Beerbower, United States Army Air Forces, for extraordinary heroism in connection with military operations against an armed enemy while serving as Pilot of a P-51 Fighter Airplane in the 353rd Fighter Squadron, 354th Fighter Group, Ninth Air Force, in aerial combat against enemy forces on 9 August 1944, while leading his squadron on an armed reconnaissance mission in the European Theater of Operations. On that date, Major Beerbower located an enemy airfield on which many aircraft were parked. In order to test the ground defenses, Major Beerbower made an experimental pass at the field destroying an enemy plane and a gun emplacement. Then, while his squadron swept over the field from one direction, he fearlessly attacked from another quarter, boldly exposing himself to concentrated fire from all sides of the field and effectively screening his comrades from the intense ground fire. Major Beerbower's airplane was struck repeatedly and crashed into the ground. The outstanding heroism and devotion to duty displayed by Major Beerbower on this occasion reflect highest credit upon himself and the Armed Forces of the United States.

== See also ==
- RAF Boxted
- Kenneth H. Dahlberg
- Wah Kau Kong
- Glenn T. Eagleston
- Jack T. Bradley
