= Wallace N. Emmer =

American flying ace

Wallace Nathan Emmer
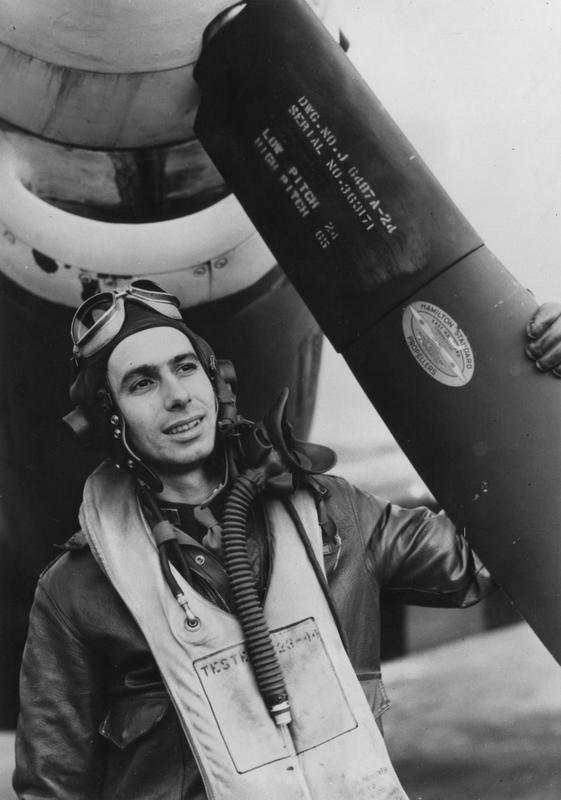
- Born: November 18, 1917; Omaha, Nebraska, U.S.
- Died: February 15, 1945 (aged 27); Wetzlar, Nazi Germany
- Burial place: New Mount Sinai Cemetery; Affton, Missouri
- Military career
- Allegiance: United States
- Branch: United States Army Air Forces
- Service years: 1942–1945
- Rank: Captain
- Nicknames: "Wally", "Bud"
- Unit: 354th Fighter Group
- Commands: 353rd Fighter Squadron
- Conflicts: World War II
- Awards: Distinguished Service Cross; Silver Star; Distinguished Flying Cross (3); Purple Heart; Air Medal (25)

Wallace Nathan Emmer (November 18, 1917 – February 15, 1945) was a United States Army Air Force fighter ace who was credited with shooting down 14 aircraft during World War II. He was also one of the first pilots to fly a combat mission in the P-51 Mustang.

== Early life ==
Emmer was born on November 18, 1917, to Vivien and Blanche Nathan Emmer, in Omaha. His family was Jewish. He grew up with a younger brother, Raymond, in St Louis, Missouri.

== Military career ==
Emmer enlisted in the U.S. Army Reserve in 1941. He joined the Aviation Cadet Program of the U.S. Army Air Forces in January 1942, and was commissioned a Second Lieutenant and awarded his pilot wings at Luke Field, Arizona, on September 29, 1942. He became a Pilot Officer at Luke Field, on September 29, 1942. Emmer served with the 20th Fighter Group at Paine Field, Washington, from September 1942 to January 1943. He was then assigned as a P-39 Airacobra pilot with the 353rd Fighter Squadron of the 354th Fighter Group in the U.S. from January to November 1943.

=== World War II ===
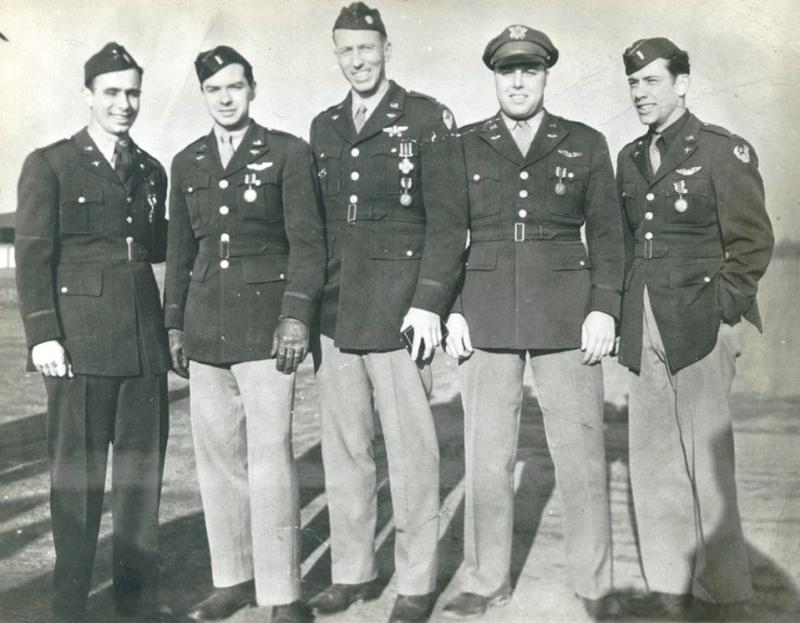
Pilots of the 354th FG. Emmer is at far left.

The 354th FG was deployed to England in November 1943 where they became the first American unit to operate the P-51. The unit was initially stationed at RAF Greenham Common in Berkshire, before moving to RAF Boxted in Colchester on November 13, 1944. Emmer flew his first combat mission on the P-51B Mustang over Europe on December 1, 1943. He was promoted to Captain on January 15, 1944. Emmer named his P-51 Mustang 'Peaceful Penguin' because he had so many mechanical troubles with his P-51.

Emmer scored his first aerial victory on February 20, 1944, when he shot down a Messerschmitt Bf 109 over Oschersleben. He scored his second and third aerial victories on March 16. On April 17, the 354th moved to RAF Lashenden. Emmer finally became a flying ace when he shot down two Bf 109s over Pölitz on May 13. On May 28, Emmer shot down three enemy aircraft over Neuhaldensleben

Following the invasion of Normandy on June 6, the 354th FG moved to Cricqueville Airfield, an Advanced Landing Ground in the Normandy region of northern France. On July 26, Emmer's flight was attacked by a group of 35 Bf 109s over the forest in St. Sever. He managed to shoot down 2.5 Bf 109s, including one shared with Lt. Carl Bickel. His flight managed to destroy nine enemy aircraft in total. For his actions, he was awarded the Distinguished Service Cross.

Emmer scored his final aerial victory on August 7. Following the death of 353rd FS commander Don M. Beerbower on August 9, Emmer was appointed as the acting commander of the squadron.

He was credited with the destruction of 14 enemy aircraft, which includes two shared destructions, one probable, and two damaged in aerial combat.

=== Final mission and death ===
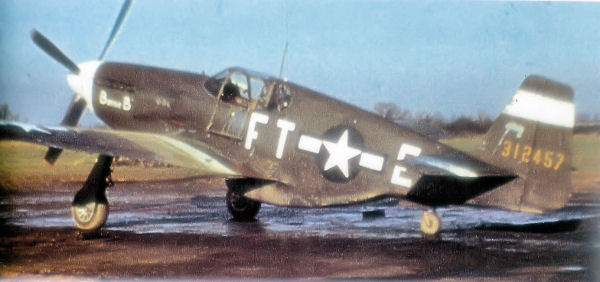
P-51B of 353 FS

On August 9, exactly on the same day he was appointed as the squadron commander, Emmer's P-51 was shot down by German flak. He was badly burned, but managed to bail out near the Seine River in the vicinity of Rouen. He was taken prisoner by the Germans and taken to a hospital where he was seen by a fellow American airman from the St. Louis area. He was first held in Stalag XII-A in Bad Orb before being interned at Stalag IX-B in Limburg an der Lahn, before being finally transferred to Dulag Luft Wetzlar.

The effects of the severe burns Emmer received included myocarditis, greatly weakening his heart. As a result, he was due to be released to the Red Cross on February 18, 1945. While awaiting transfer on that day, as he stood next to an air raid siren, it sounded an alarm; he collapsed into the arms of fellow POW F/O Leonard A. Walker of the RAAF and died, the result of a heart attack. He was buried at an Allied section at a cemetery in Büblingshausen.

Emmer's brother Raymond Phillip (born 1925) served in the U.S. Army's 394th Infantry Regiment and was killed in action in Germany on November 18, 1944.

After the end of World War II, Emmer's father managed to repatriate Emmer's remains and those of his brother, from Europe to St. Louis, Missouri.

== Aerial victory credits ==
Chronicle of aerial victories
Date	#	Type	Location	Aircraft flown	Unit Assigned
February 22, 1944	1	Messerschmitt Bf 109	Oschersleben, Germany	P-51B	353 FS, 354 FG
March 16, 1944	1	Bf 109	Nördlingen, Germany	P-51B	353 FS, 354 FG
March 16, 1944	1	Focke-Wulf Fw 190	Darmstadt, Germany	P-51B	353 FS, 354 FG
May 13, 1944	2	Bf 109	Pölitz, Germany	P-51B	353 FS, 354 FG
May 28, 1944	2	Bf 109	Neuhaldensleben, Germany	P-51B	353 FS, 354 FG
May 28, 1944	1	Fw 190	Neuhaldensleben, Germany	P-51B	353 FS, 354 FG
June 12, 1944	1	Fw 190	Bonn, Germany	P-51B	353 FS, 354 FG
June 14, 1944	1	Bf 109	Caen, France	P-51B	353 FS, 354 FG
June 29, 1944	0.5	Fw 190	Barbechat, France	P-51B	353 FS, 354 FG
July 26, 1944	2.5	Bf 109	St. Sever, France	P-51B	353 FS, 354 FG
August 7, 1944	1	Bf 109	Mayenne, France	P-51B	353 FS, 354 FG

SOURCES: Air Force Historical Study 85: USAF Credits for the Destruction of Enemy Aircraft, World War II

== Awards and decorations ==
His awards include:

USAAF Pilot Badge
Distinguished Service Cross
Silver Star
Distinguished Flying Cross with two bronze oak leaf clusters
Purple Heart
Air Medal with four silver oak leaf clusters
Air Medal with three bronze oak leaf clusters (second ribbon required for accouterment spacing)
Prisoner of War Medal
American Campaign Medal
European-African-Middle Eastern Campaign Medal with four bronze campaign stars
World War II Victory Medal
French Croix de Guerre with Palm

=== Distinguished Service Cross citation ===

Emmer, Wallace N.
Captain, U.S. Army Air Forces
353rd Fighter Squadron, 354th Fighter Group, 9th Air Force
Date of Action: July 26, 1944

Citation:

The President of the United States of America, authorized by Act of Congress July 9, 1918, takes pleasure in presenting the Distinguished Service Cross to Captain (Air Corps) Wallace Nathan Emmer, United States Army Air Forces, for extraordinary heroism in connection with military operations against an armed enemy while serving as Pilot of a P-51 Fighter Airplane in the 353d Fighter Squadron, 354th Fighter Group, Ninth Air Force, in aerial combat against enemy forces on July 26, 1944, in the European Theater of Operations. While leading eight P-51 fighter planes of the Pioneer Mustang group on a fighter sweep of the St. Lo area, just prior to the breakthrough there, Captain Emmer fearlessly led his squadron in a superb attack on 40 enemy fighters heading for the clouds below to attack our ground troops. The intercepting maneuver created confusion among the enemy and prevented them from attacking our ground forces. Captain Emmer destroyed two enemy aircraft and assisted in destruction of a third. Captain Emmer's unquestionable valor in aerial combat is in keeping with the highest traditions of the military service and reflects great credit upon himself, the 9th Air Force, and the United States Army Air Forces.
