= 354th Fighter Group =

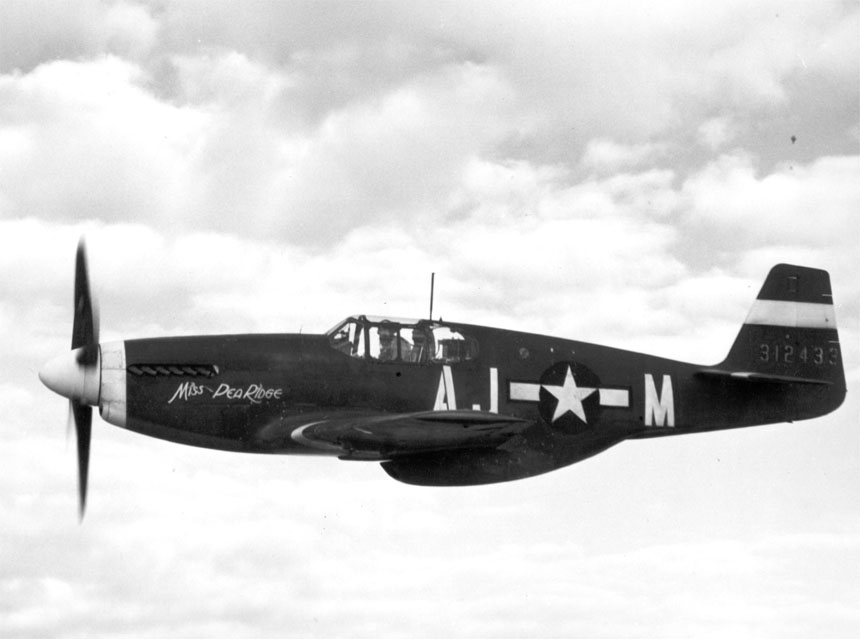
- P-51B Mustang of the 356th Fighter Squadron, 354th Fighter Group
- Active: 15 November 1942 – 31 March 1946
- Country: United States
- Branch: United States Army Air Forces
- Type: Fighter group
- Part of: 100th Fighter Wing; Ninth Air Force
- Nickname: Pioneer Mustang Group
- Motto: Valor in Combat
- Engagements: Air Offensive, Europe; Normandy; Market Garden; Battle of the Bulge; Invasion of Germany
- Decorations: Distinguished Unit Citation (2); Croix de Guerre with Palm

Insignia
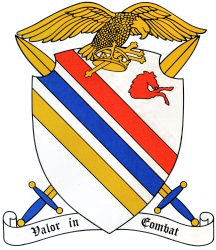
- 354th Fighter Group Emblem
- 353rd Fighter Squadron: FT
- 355th Fighter Squadron: GQ
- 356th Fighter Squadron: AJ

Aircraft flown
- Fighter: Republic P-47 Thunderbolt 1944–1945; North American P-51 Mustang 1943–1945

The 354th Fighter Group was an element of the United States Army Air Forces (USAAF) Ninth Air Force during World War II. The unit was known as the Pioneer Mustang Group and was the first to fly the P-51B Mustang in combat. The group served as bomber escort in the European theater of operations until D-Day, then moved to France to support the drive to Germany.

== Training in the United States ==
The 354th Fighter Group was constituted on 12 November and activated on 15 November 1942, at Hamilton Army Airfield in California. The Group trained with the Bell P-39 Airacobra, one of the principal fighter aircraft in service at the time. The group transferred to Tonopah Army Air Field, Nevada in January 1943, Santa Rosa Army Air Field, California in March 1943, and Portland Army Air Base, Oregon, in June 1943

== Deployment to Europe ==
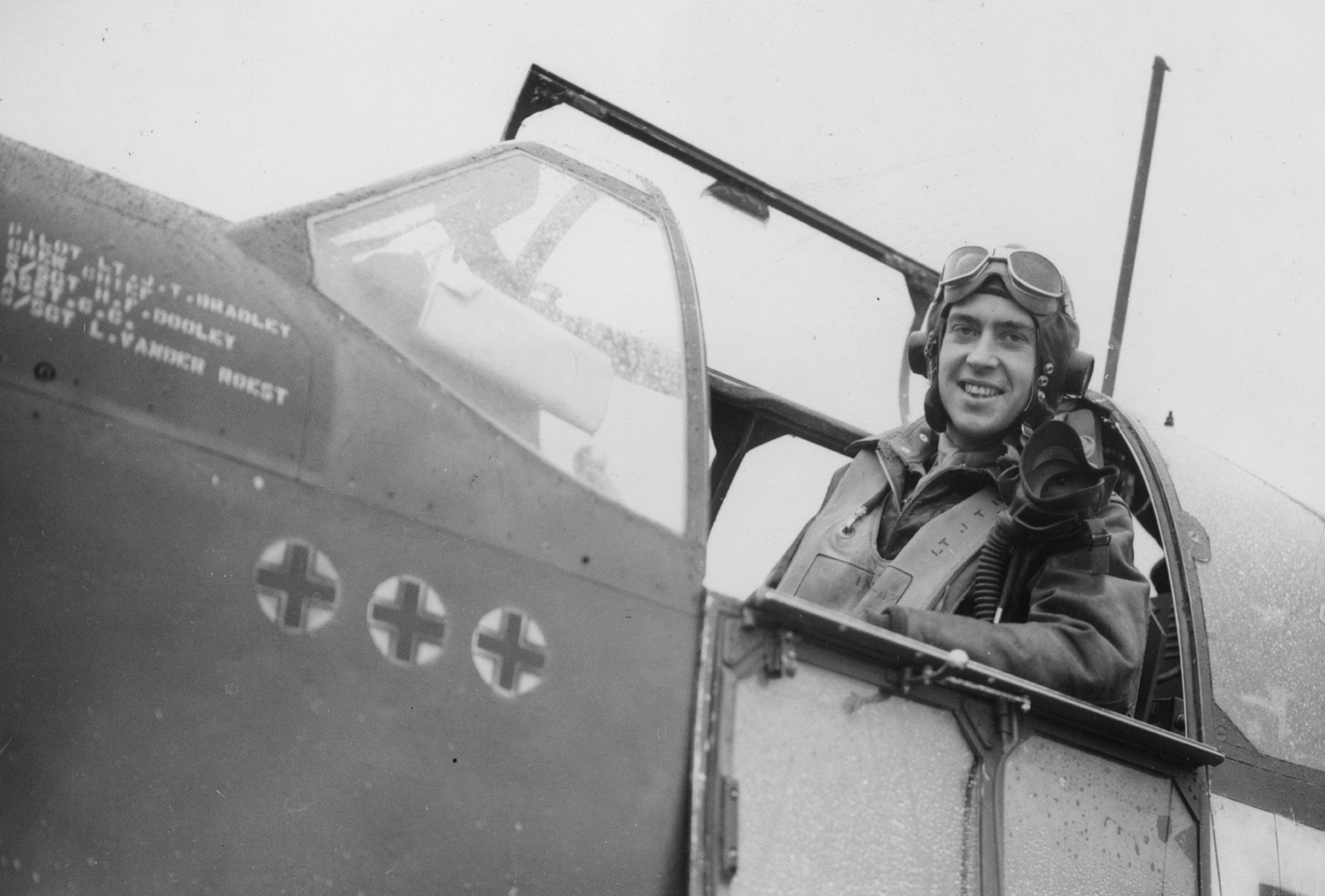
Jack T. Bradley, triple ace and commander of the 353rd Fighter Squadron

The Group moved to RAF Boxted in England between October and November 1943 and was attached to the Ninth Air Force. The group was issued the new P-51B Mustang aircraft and was the first to use them in combat. These aircraft were used by the group throughout the war except for the period between November 1944 and February 1945 when they used the Republic P-47 Thunderbolt.

Although the group was intended for ground attack as the P51B had the high altitude performance Merlin, the 354th was ordered to fly as escort for long-range heavy bombers of the Eighth Air Force while remaining within 9th AF command structure. The Group received a Distinguished Unit Citation for its activities up to May 1944.

The Group moved to RAF Lashenden in April 1944.

Major James H. Howard commander of the 356th Fighter Squadron received the Medal of Honor for single-handedly defending a formation of Boeing B-17 Flying Fortress bombers of the 401st Bomb Group against 30 German fighters on 11 January 1944. Howard was the only fighter pilot in the European Theater of Operations in World War II to receive the Medal of Honor.

The Group supported the Normandy invasion in Jun 1944 by escorting gliders on D-Day and attacking ground targets such as bridges, railways, and German gun positions in northern France

The Group moved to Cricqueville Airfield in France in June 1944, to Gael Airfield in August 1944, Orconte Airfield, in September 1944, and Rosieres En Haye Airfield, in November 1944.

The 354th received a second Distinguished Unit Citation for destroying a large number of enemy aircraft on the ground and in the air in support of the airborne attack on Holland in September 1944.

The Group participated in the Battle of the Bulge from December 1944 to January 1945 supporting ground forces and supported the crossing of the Rhine between February and May 1945. The Group moved into Germany in April 1945 to Ober Olm Airfield (Y-64) then to Ansbach Airfield and to AAF Station Herzogenaurach in May 1945.

== Return to the United States ==
The Group returned to Bolling Field, Washington, D.C., in February 1946 and was inactivated on 31 Mar 1946.

The 354th Fighter Group was redesignated 117th Fighter Group and assigned to the Alabama Air National Guard on 24 May 1946. However, on 26 Sep 1956, the group returned to the Air Force where 354th lineage is now held by the 354th Operations Group. The 117th Fighter Group lineage is held by the 117th Operations Group of the Alabama Air National Guard.

== Notable pilots ==
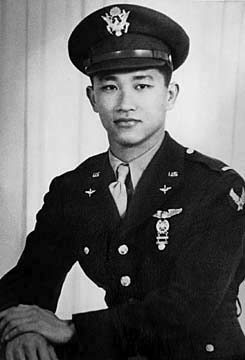
Wau Kau Kong of the 353rd Fighter Squadron was the first Chinese American fighter pilot

- Glenn T. Eagleston was the leading ace of the 354th Fighter Group and a commander of the 353rd Fighter Squadron. Eagleston was credited with 18.5 aerial victories, two probable, seven damaged, and five aircraft destroyed on the ground.
- Don M. Beerbower was the second leading ace with 15.5 victories. He was shot down and killed on 9 August 1944. near Reims, France.
- James H. Howard was the commander of 356th Fighter Squadron. As a Flying Tiger, he scored 6 kills in the Pacific Theater before joining the Army Air Corps in 1943. He received the Medal of Honor for single-handedly defending a bomber formation from more than 30 attackers for more than 30 minutes, confirmedly shooting down 2 and probably shooting down 2 more. He damaged an additional 2. He was transferred to the Air Force Reserve in 1947, and retired in 1965 as a brigadier general.
- Jack T. Bradley was a commanding officer of the 353rd Fighter Squadron and the third leading ace in the 354th Fighter Group.
- Kenneth H. Dahlberg of the 353rd Fighter Squadron was credited with 14 aerial victories. Dahlberg was shot down three times and was able to return to the 354th twice. On 14 February 1945, Dahlberg was downed for the third time, near Bitburg, and became a prisoner of war until May 1945.
- Wallace N. Emmer was credited with 14 aerial victories. He was shot down on 9 August 1944, and later died in a German prisoner of war camp on 18 February 1945.
- Wah Kau Kong was born in Honolulu, Hawaii, and was America's first Chinese American fighter pilot. He was killed in action over Blomberg, Germany, on 22 February 1944.
- Charles F. Gumm Jr. was a pilot with 355th Fighter Squadron. He became the first pilot to shoot down an enemy plane in the P-51 Mustang and was the first flying ace of the 354th Fighter Group.
- Mike Rogers was a pilot with the 353rd Fighter Squadron, with claims of 12 enemy aircraft destroyed. He remained in the Air Force and retired in 1978 in the grade of general and commander of Air Force Logistics Command.
