= Hackler =

Hackler is an English and German surname. Notable people with the surname include:

- Heinz Hackler (1918–1945), German fighter pilot
- James F. Hackler (1920–2007), US Air Force general
