= Jack T. Bradley =

American World War II flying ace

Jack Tarleton Bradley
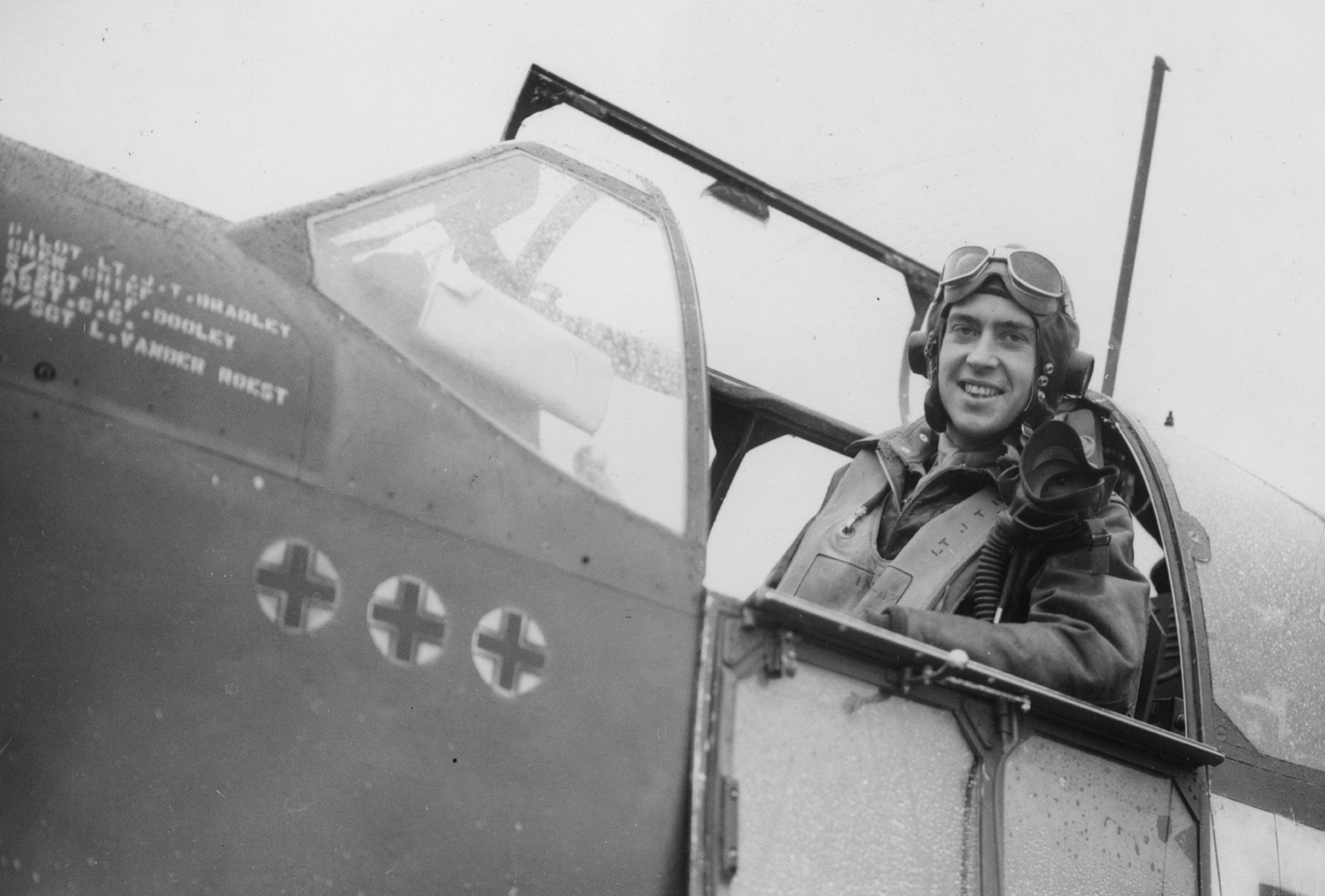
- Bradley in the cockpit of his P-51 Mustang
- Born: June 6, 1918; Brownwood, Texas
- Died: July 4, 2000 (aged 82); Brown County, Texas
- Burial place: Eastlawn Memorial Park Cemetery; Early, Texas
- Military career
- Allegiance: United States of America
- Branch: United States Army Air Forces; United States Air Force
- Service years: 1942–1962
- Rank: Colonel
- Service number: O-36537
- Unit: 354th Fighter Group
- Commands: 353rd Fighter Squadron
- Conflicts: World War II
- Awards: Distinguished Service Cross; Silver Star; Distinguished Flying Cross (2); Air Medal (22)

Jack Tarleton Bradley (June 6, 1918 – July 4, 2000) was a United States Army Air Forces flying ace who was credited with shooting down 15 aircraft during World War II, being awarded the Distinguished Service Cross and the Distinguished Flying Cross for his actions. He served as commanding officer of the 353rd Fighter Squadron.

Bradley's combat experiences during World War II were notably documented through film, and he recorded several minutes of footage produced by his P-51 Mustang's gun camera.

== Early life ==
Bradley was born in Brownwood, Texas, on June 6, 1918. He attended Howard Payne College in Brownwood and joined its pilot training program.

== Military career ==
In 1941, Bradley joined the United States Army Air Corps Flying Cadet Program in Dallas, and was commissioned with the rank of Second Lieutenant. Following the start of American involvement in World War II, Bradley was assigned to 353rd Fighter Squadron, 354th Fighter Group, part of the USAAF's Ninth Air Force.

Bradley's experiences during the war were recorded on film, mostly through the gun camera of his P-51 Mustang, which recorded silent films of his strafes and dogfights while serving in the European theatre. He is also believed to have recorded footage of a destroyed German airfield captured by the Allies.

On May 28, 1944, then-Major Bradley was leading the 353rd Fighter Squadron during an escort of a large bomber formation, which was conducting an attack deep within Germany. Observing a large group of Luftwaffe fighters about to attack the bombers, Bradley directed his squadron to protect the bombers and led them to combat. Bradley shot down two fighters, while his squadron accounted for ten downed enemy fighters. The bombers were unscathed. For his actions, Bradley was awarded the Distinguished Service Cross, the second highest medal given to members of the United States Army, of which the USAAF was a branch.

Following the war, Bradley remained in the United States Air Force. He acted as a technical advisor for the 1950 Humphrey Bogart film Chain Lightning. He retired from the Air Force in 1962 at the rank of colonel.

== Later life and death ==
Bradley died on July 4, 2000, in his birthplace of Brown County, Texas. He was buried at Eastlawn Memorial Park Cemetery in Early, Texas.

== Awards and decorations ==
USAF Command pilot badge
| Distinguished Service Cross |
| Silver Star |
| Distinguished Flying Cross with bronze oak leaf cluster |
| Air Medal with four silver oak leaf clusters |
| Air Medal with bronze oak leaf cluster (second ribbon required for accoutrement spacing) |
| Air Force Presidential Unit Citation |
| American Campaign Medal |
| European-African-Middle Eastern Campaign Medal with three bronze campaign stars |
| World War II Victory Medal |
| National Defense Service Medal with service star |
| Air Force Longevity Service Award with four bronze oak leaf clusters |
| Croix de Guerre with Palm (France) |
| Distinguished Flying Cross (United Kingdom) |

=== Distinguished Service Cross citation ===
The President of the United States of America, authorized by Act of Congress, July 9, 1918, takes pleasure in presenting the Distinguished Service Cross to Major (Air Corps) Jack T. Bradley, United States Army Air Forces, for extraordinary heroism in connection with military operations against an armed enemy while serving as Pilot of a P-51 Fighter Airplane in the 353rd Fighter Squadron, 354th Fighter Group, NINTH Air Force, in aerial combat against enemy forces on 28 May 1944, during an air mission over Germany. On this date while leading his squadron of fighter airplanes in escort of a large bomber formation attacking a highly important and exceedingly well defended target deep within Germany, Major Bradley observed a large group of enemy fighters about to attack the bombers. Without hesitation he directed his forces to give maximum protection to the bombers and, although under repeated attack himself, dived fearlessly into the midst of the enemy formation and personally destroyed two enemy airplanes while his squadron accounted for ten. The enemy attack was so completely disorganized, that not a single enemy airplane reached the bombers. The outstanding heroism and skill displayed by Major Bradley on this occasion reflect highest credit upon himself, the 9th Air Force, and the United States Army Air Forces.

== See also ==
- Glenn T. Eagleston
- Wah Kau Kong
- RAF Boxted
- Headcorn Aerodrome
