= 354th Operations Group =

354th Operations Group

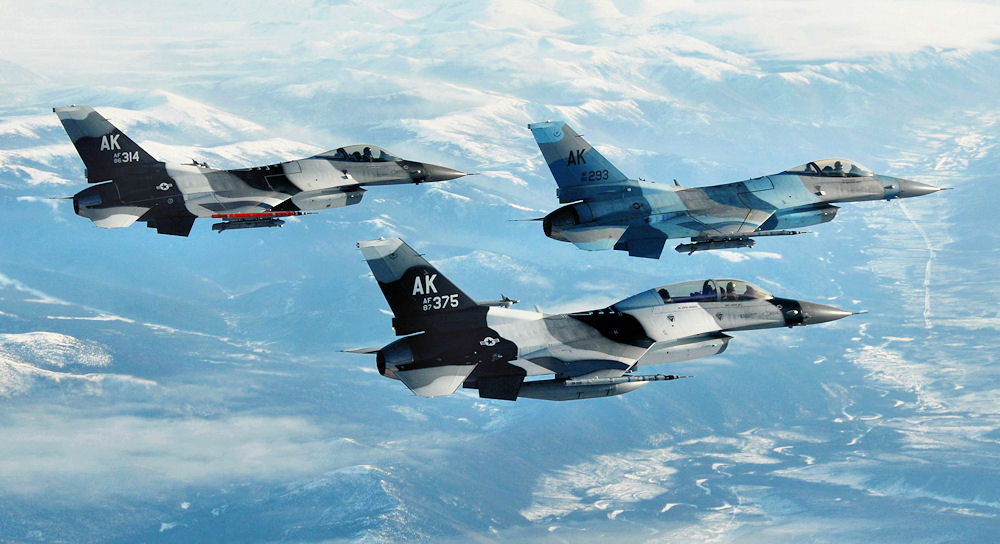
- 18th Aggressor Squadron Block 30D F-16Cs, 86–314; 86–293 and 87–375 in Arctic color scheme.
- Active: 1942–1946; 1956–1957; 1993–present
- Country: United States
- Branch: United States Air Force
- Type: Operations Group
- Role: Aggressor Training
- Part of: 354th Fighter Wing; Pacific Air Forces
- Garrison/HQ: Eielson Air Force Base, Alaska
- Motto(s): Valor in Combat
- Engagements: World War II (EAME Theater): Normandy Campaign; Northern France Campaign; Rhineland Campaign; Ardennes-Alsace Campaign; Central Europe Campaign; Air Combat, EAME Theater

- Decorations: Distinguished Unit Citation: European Theater of Operations, December 1943 – 15 May 1944; France, 25 August 1944; Air Force Outstanding Unit Award (4x) French Croix de Guerre with Palm: 1 Dec 1943 – 31 Dec 1944

Insignia
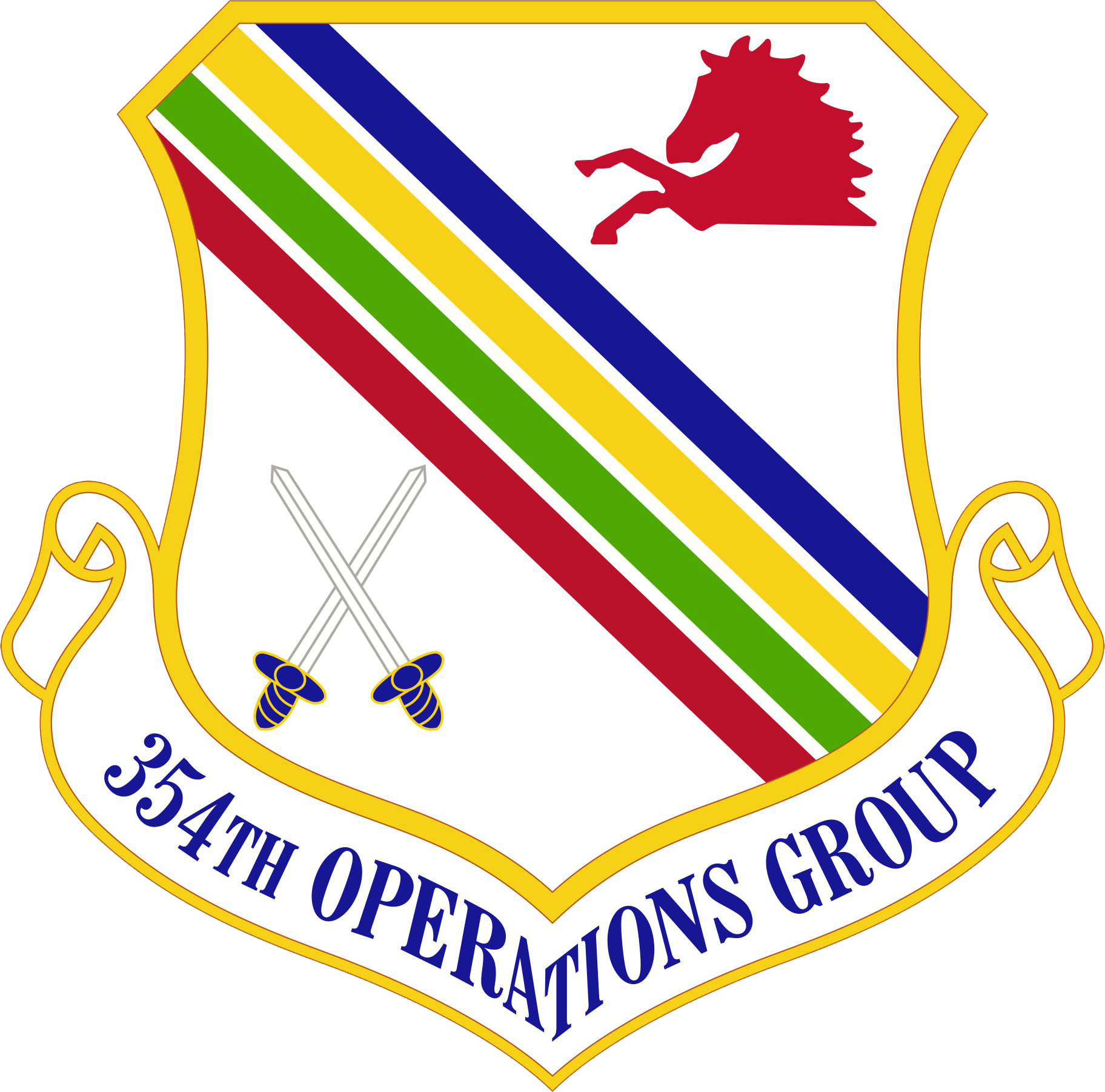
- 354th Operations Group emblem (approved 24 November 2020)

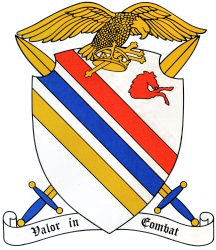
- 354th Fighter Group emblem
- Tail code: AK

The 354th Operations Group is a component of the 354th Fighter Wing, assigned to the United States Air Force Pacific Air Forces. The group is stationed at Eielson Air Force Base, Alaska.

== Overview ==
The 354th Operations Group provides air-bridge support and realistic combat flying training in support of 354th Fighter Wing, Air Force and national objectives.

The Group's major mission is RED FLAG-Alaska, 10-day air combat training exercise held up to four times a year. Each exercise is a multi-service, multi-platform coordinated, combat operations exercise and corresponds to the designed operational capability of participating units. In other words, exercises often involve several units whose military mission may differ significantly from that of other participating units.

RED FLAG-Alaska planners take those factors into consideration when designing exercises so participants get the maximum training possible without being placed at an unfair advantage during simulated combat scenarios.

== Assigned units ==
The 354 OG (Tail Code: AK) is the flying component of the 354th Fighter Wing. Its component units are:

- 18th Fighter Interceptor Squadron (18 FIS) (Block 30 F-16C Falcon)

Aircraft are painted in a grey, black and white aggressor color scheme. About three or four aircraft wear a unique Arctic aggressor scheme which uses black, white and grey. "AK" tail codes.

- 355th Fighter Squadron (F-35A Lightning II)
- 356th Fighter Squadron (F-35A Lightning II)
- 354th Operations Support Squadron
- 353d Combat Training Squadron

== History ==
=== World War II ===
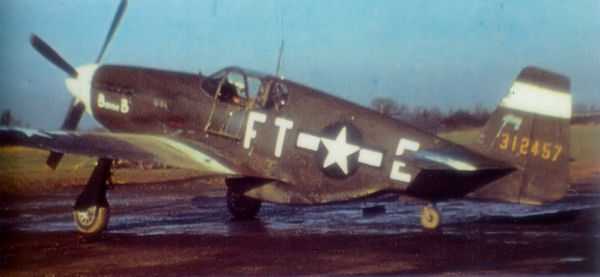
North American P-51B-1-NA Mustang 43-12457 of the 353d Fighter Squadron 354th Fighter Group at RAF Lashenden in 1944.

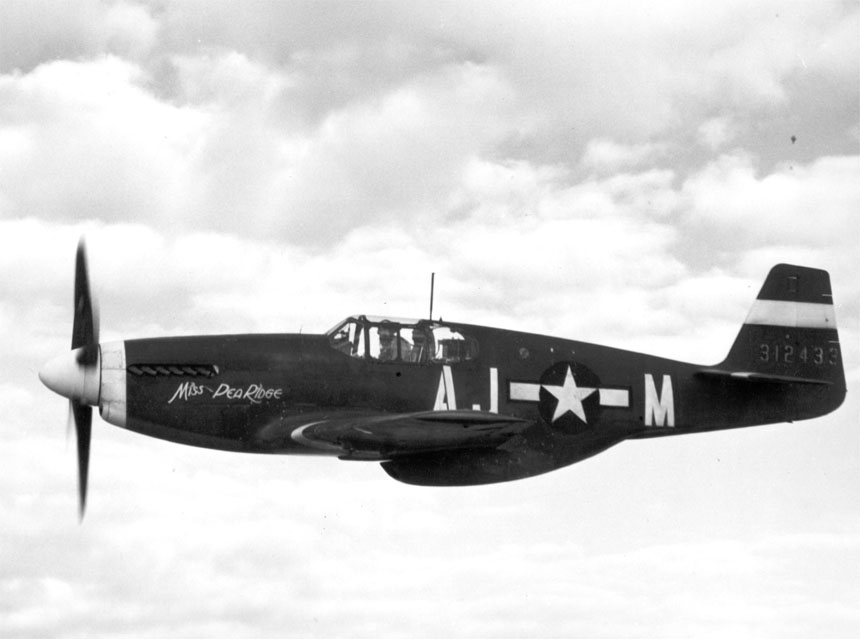
North American P-51B-1-NA 43-12433 "Miss Pea Ridge" AJ-M flown by Capt Mack Tyner in the 356th FS 354th FG 9th AF in 1944 (later transferred to the 362nd FS 357th FG and re-badged as "G4-L").

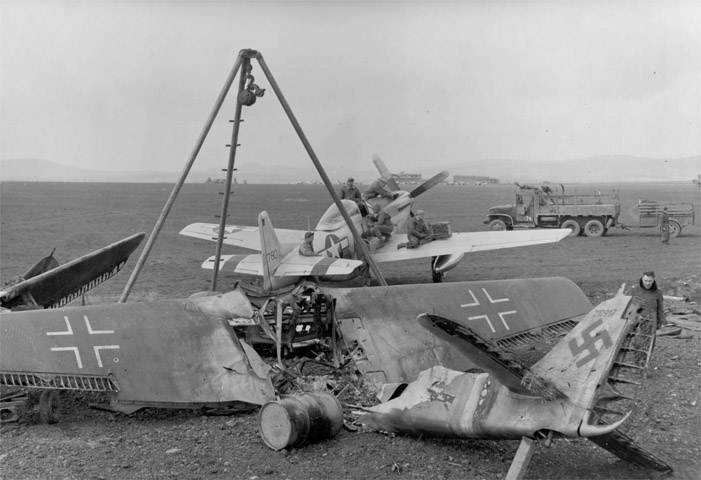
A 354th FG P-51D at Ober-Olm, Germany, in April 1945.

see also: Colonel James H. Howard, Medal of Honor recipient

The 354th Fighter Group was constituted on 12 November 1942 and activated on 15 November 1942. They trained on the Bell P-39 Airacobra and served as part of the Western Air Defense Force. The three operational squadrons of the group were the 353rd FS ("FT"), the 355th FS ("GQ") and the 356th FS ("AJ") Fighter Squadrons.

On 4 November 1943, the group was moved to Portland AAF, Oregon and were informed that they were to fly the brand new North American P-51B Mustang. This was a big change of equipment for the Fighter Group—the Mustang being a more capable aircraft with excellent high-altitude performance that would be required for escorting heavy bomber groups of the Eighth Air Force against Germany.

The 354th FG was then transferred to RAF Greenham Common in England, but only remained at that base for a few days, next being transferred to RAF Boxted in Essex on 13 November 1943.

At RAF Boxted, the 354th provided long-range escort for USAAF heavy bombers and received a Distinguished Unit Citation for its activities up to mid-May 1944, during which the 354th was instrumental in the development of the P-51 for use in long-range missions to escort heavy bombers on raids deep into enemy territory. As a result, priority for the Mustang was shifted from the Ninth to the Eighth Air Force, which eventually converted 14 of its 15 Fighter Groups to the P-51. The 354th also gained the distinction of destroying more enemy aircraft in aerial combat than any other USAAF fighter group (701 enemy aircraft).

During that same period, Colonel James H. Howard won the Medal of Honor for his single-handed efforts defending a bomber formation that was attacked by a large force of enemy planes while on a mission to Oschersleben, Germany on 11 January 1944. Colonel Howard single-handedly attacked a formation of thirty German aircraft. Pressing home the attack for more than thirty minutes, he destroyed three aircraft, and even when he was low on fuel and his ammunition was exhausted, he continued his aggressive tactics to protect the bombers.

In mid-April 1944, the 354th flew south to RAF Lashenden in Kent prior to moving to the continent after the invasion of Normandy.

Although assigned to Ninth Air Force, the 354th was under the operational control of the Eighth Fighter Command and many missions flown by the 354th in April and May were long-range escorts of Eighth Air Force heavy B-17 and B-24 bombers. It was on these occasions that the group displayed its expertise in air fighting.

On 25 April on an escort to Mannheim. The group returned to RAF Lashenden with claims of 18 destroyed, five probably destroyed and 31 damaged. all for the loss of two Mustangs. On 11 May, claims of 11 Luftwaffe aircraft destroyed on another long-range escort included the 354th's 100th victory. Yet another high score resulted from an air battle near Magdeburg on 28 May when 19 1/2 enemy aircraft were credited as shot down.

An increasing number of dive-bombing missions were flown during the weeks prior to the invasion, each Mustang carrying two 250 or 500 pound bombs on wing racks, the targets being frequently rail installations.

When D-Day arrived, the 354th's pilots were disappointed to be kept on the ground until 21:00 hours, when they took off to escort Douglas C-47 Skytrains towing gliders for a landing on the Cotentin Peninsula near Cherbourg Naval Base. Following the invasion, the group's Mustangs found their primary tasks were patrols over the battlefield areas. These were often uneventful as far as contact with enemy aircraft was concerned.

The 354th group headquarters had learned that they would probably be one of the first Ninth Air Force flying units to move to one of the advanced landing strips being prepared in the Normandy bridgehead, and the advance party left Lashenden for Criqueville, France (ALG A-2) on 13 June 1944. The main party moved on 17 June, although the group's P-51s continued to return to RAF Lashenden throughout the following week.

During its stay at RAF Lashenden, the 354th FG lost 23 aircraft, but was credited with destroying 68 of the enemy. The group's operations from France assisted the Allied drive across France by flying close-support, armed-reconnaissance, fighter-sweep, dive-bombing, strafing, and escort missions. The 354th Fighter Group received a Distinguished Unit Citation for a series of fighter sweeps in which the group destroyed a large number of enemy aircraft in the air and on the ground on 25 August.

The unit flew missions to support the airborne attack on the Netherlands in September, and it attacked and destroyed many enemy barges, locomotives, vehicles, buildings, and troops to assist the Allied assault on the Siegfried Line.

The group participated in the Battle of the Bulge by supporting ground forces and by conducting armed reconnaissance operations to destroy enemy troops, tank artillery, and rail lines. Assisted ground forces in their advance to and across the Rhine and was based at Herzogenaurach, Germany (ALG R-29) when V-E Day arrived.

By war's end, the 354th FG was officially credited by USAAF Command with the highest number of enemy aircraft destroyed in the air (701 confirmed kills) of any U.S. Fighter Group in the ETO during World War II. (Note: By counting aircraft destroyed both in the air and on the ground, the 56th Fighter Group claimed the highest number of kills in the ETO during World War II.) After hostilities ended, the 354th Fighter Group served with United States Air Forces in Europe army of occupation until February 1946, being returned to the United States and inactivated on 31 March 1946.

=== Cold War ===
see also: Brigadier General James F. Hackler, commander of the 354th Fighter-Day Group (1956–1957)

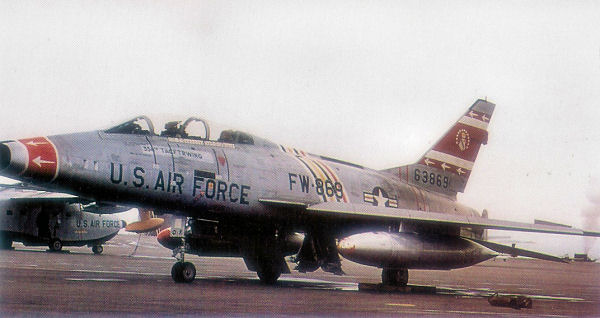
North American F-100F-10-NA Super Sabre serial 56-3869 of the 353d Tactical Fighter Squadron

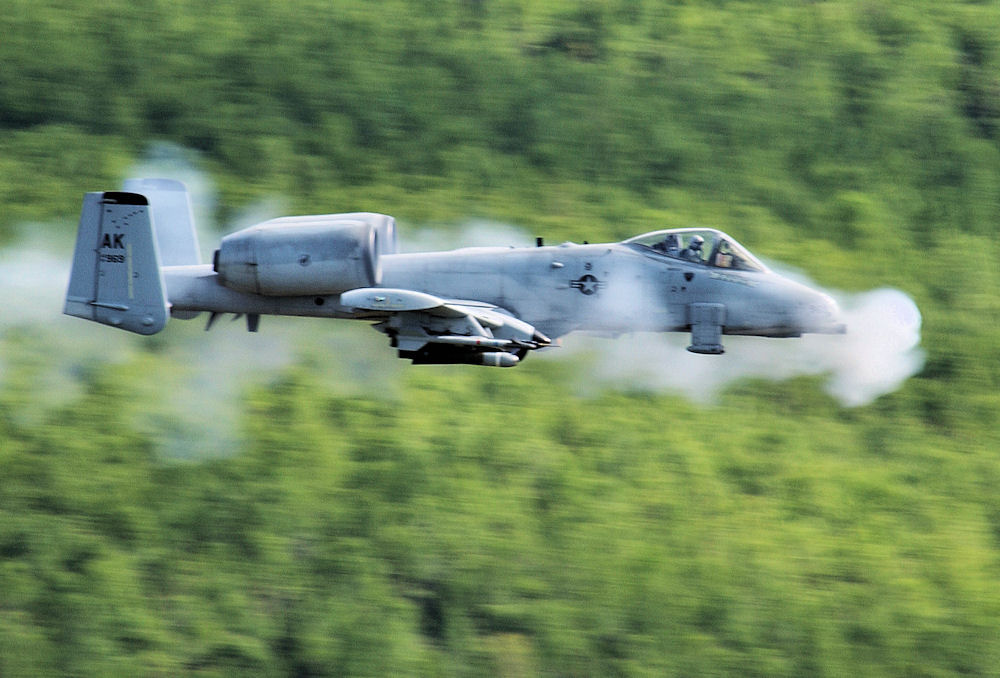
355th Fighter Squadron Fairchild Republic A-10A Thunderbolt II 81–0969. Sent to Moody AFB in 2007 now part of 23d OG

On 19 November 1956 the Air Force replaced the 342d Fighter-Day Wing at Myrtle Beach Air Force Base, South Carolina with the 354th Fighter-Day Wing. The 342d Fighter-Day Group's fighter squadrons (33d, 572d and 573d) were replaced by the 353d, 355th and 356th Fighter-Day Squadrons and assigned to the 354th Fighter-Day Group. In addition, the 352d Fighter-Day Squadron was activated and assigned to the Group. Upon activation the new group was assigned to the wing.

The group was active for a brief period training in fighter operations. It was inactivated on 25 September 1957 and its components assigned directly the wing when the Air Force reorganized its wings into the dual deputate system.

=== Modern era ===
On 20 August 1993, the 354th Operations Group was activated as part of the 354th Fighter Wing's activation at Eielson Air Force Base, Alaska, replacing the organization and components of the 343d Wing. This change was part of a service-wide effort to preserve the lineage of the Air Force's most honored wings. Upon activation, the 354th OG was bestowed the history, lineage and honors of the 354th Fighter Group from the 354 FW. The 353d and 355th Fighter Squadrons were also reactivated at Eielson and assigned to the 354 OG under the objective wing structure. The group trained for close air support, battlefield air interdiction, and anti-maritime operations.

In 1994, the 353d was redesignated as a Combat Training Squadron. Its assigned mission was to coordinate and direct PACAF's premier training exercise, COPE THUNDER. Additionally, it was given oversight and management of the largest air training complex in the world, the 67,000-square-mile (170,000 km^{2}) Pacific Alaska Range Complex. Though the exercise has been renamed RED FLAG-Alaska, the 353 CTS mission remains unchanged. In 2003 it was reassigned to the 3d Wing at Elmendorf AFB.

Under BRAC 2005 the 354th's 355th Fighter Squadron was inactivated on 24 August 2007, and its Fairchild Republic A-10 Thunderbolt II aircraft sent to Moody Air Force Base, Georgia, becoming part of the 23d Fighter Group. The same day, the 18th Fighter Squadron became the 18th Aggressor Squadron and reequipped with Block 30 General Dynamics F-16 Fighting Falcon aircraft, sending its newer Block 40s to Kunsan Air Base, South Korea and becoming part of Red Flag - Alaska.

== Lineage ==
- Established as the 354th Fighter Group on 12 November 1942

Activated on 15 November 1942
Redesignated 354th Fighter Group, Single Engine on 20 August 1943
Inactivated on 31 March 1946 (Note: The group was redesignated 117th Fighter Group, Single Engine and allotted to the National Guard on 24 May 1946. On 28 September 1956, the designation and allotment of the group to the National Guard were revoked. The 117th Fighter Group was simultaneously constituted retroactive to 24 May 1946 and allotted to the National Guard. All organizational actions between 1946 and 1956 pertaining to the 117th Group then applied to the "new" 117th, which is not related to the 354th. Maurer, p. 235.)

- Redesignated 354th Fighter-Day Group on 28 September 1956

Activated on 19 November 1956
Inactivated on 25 September 1957

- Redesignated 354th Tactical Fighter Group on 31 July 1985 (Remained inactive)
- Redesignated 354th Operations Group on 1 August 1993

Activated on 20 August 1993

=== Assignments ===
- IV Fighter Command, 15 November 1942
- Ninth Air Force, c. 3 November 1943
- IX Fighter Command, November 1943
- 100th Fighter Wing, 27 November 1943
- 70th Fighter Wing, 2 December 1943
- 100th Fighter Wing, 15 April 1944 (under operational control of 70th Fighter Wing, c. 22 June–19 August 1944)
- XII Tactical Air Command, 4 July 1945
- Continental Air Forces (later Strategic Air Command), 15 February 1946 – 31 March 1946
- 354th Fighter-Day Wing, 19 November 1956 – 25 September 1957
- 354th Fighter Wing, 20 August 1993 – present

=== Components ===
- 3d Air Support Operations Squadron, 20 August 1993 – 1 July 1994, 14 February 2003 – 1 October 2008
- 18th Fighter Squadron (later 18th Aggressor Squadron): 20 August 1993–present
- 352d Fighter-Day Squadron, 19 November 1956 – 25 September 1957
- 353d Fighter Squadron (later 353d Fighter-Day Squadron, 353d Fighter Squadron, 353d Combat Training Squadron): 15 November 1942 – 31 March 1946; 19 November 1956 – 25 September 1957; 20 August 1993 – present
- 355th Fighter Squadron (later 355th Fighter-Day Squadron, 355th Fighter Squadron): 15 November 1942 – 31 March 1946; 19 November 1956 – 25 September 1957; 20 August 1993 – 15 August 2007
- 356th Fighter Squadron (later 356th Fighter-Day Squadron): 15 November 1942 – 31 March 1946; 19 November 1956 – 25 September 1957; 10 October 2019 – present
- 354th Operations Support Squadron: 20 August 1993 – present

=== Stations ===
- Hamilton Field, California, 15 November 1942
- Tonopah Army Air Field, Nevada, 19 January 1943
- Santa Rosa Army Air Field, California, 2 March 1943
- Portland Army Air Base, Oregon, 2 June – 5 October 1943
- RAF Greenham Common (AAF-486), England, 4 November 1943
- RAF Boxted (AAF-150), England, 13 November 1943
- RAF Lashenden (AAF-410), England, 17 April 1944
- Cricqueville Airfield (A-2), France, c. 22 June 1944
- Gael Airfield (A-31), France, 13 August 1944
- Orconte Airfield, France (A-66), 17 September 1944
- Rosieres En Haye Airfield, France (A-98), c.1 December 1944
- Ober Olm Airfield (Y-64), Germany, 8 April 1945
- Ansbach Airfield (R-45), Germany, 30 April 1945
- AAF Station Herzogenaurach, Germany, 18 May 1945 – 15 February 1946
- Bolling Field, Washington, DC, 15 February 1931 March 1946
- Myrtle Beach Air Force Base, South Carolina, 19 November 1956 – 25 September 1957
- Eielson Air Force Base, Alaska, 20 August 1993 – present

=== Aircraft ===
- Bell P-39 Airacobra, 1943
- North American P-51B Mustang, 1943
- North American P-51C Mustang, 1944, 1945–1946
- North American P-51D Mustang, 1944, 1945–1946
- Republic P-47D Thunderbolt, 1944–1945
- North American F-100D Super Sabre, 1956–1957
- North American F-100F Super Sabre, 1956–1957
- Fairchild Republic A/OA-10 Thunderbolt II, 1993–2007
- Block 40 F-16C/D Fighting Falcon, 1993–2007
- Block 30 F-16C/D Fighting Falcon, 2007–present
