= Charles F. Gumm Jr. =

American flying ace (1920–1944)

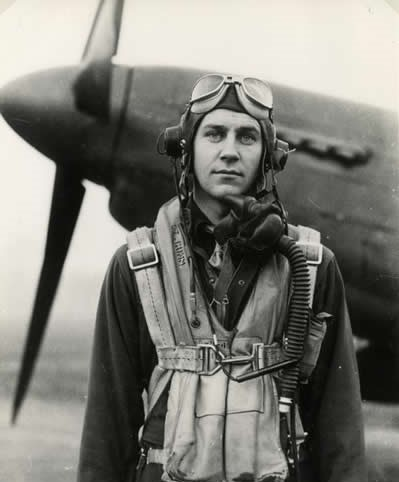
- Gumm, c. 1942–1944
- Born: Charles Francis Gumm Jr. October 29, 1920; Spokane, Washington, U.S.
- Died: March 1, 1944 (aged 23); Suffolk, England
- Burial place: Greenwood Memorial Terrace, Spokane
- Military career
- Allegiance: United States
- Branch: United States Army Air Forces
- Service years: 1942–1944
- Rank: First lieutenant
- Nickname: Chuck
- Units: 355th Fighter Squadron; 354th Fighter Group
- Conflicts: World War II
- Awards: Silver Star; Distinguished Flying Cross; Soldier's Medal; Air Medal (4)

Charles Francis Gumm Jr. (October 29, 1920 – March 1, 1944) was an American flying ace in the 354th Fighter Group and the first pilot to score an aerial victory in the North American P-51 Mustang.

== Early life ==
Gumm was born in 1920 in Spokane, Washington. He was a relative of actress Judy Garland. After graduating from John R. Rogers High School in 1939, he attended Gonzaga University for higher studies.

== Military career ==
After the entry of United States into World War II after the Japanese attack on Pearl Harbor on December 7, 1941, Gumm dropped out of his studies at Gonzaga and enlisted in the Aviation Cadet Program of the United States Army Air Forces in January 1942. He earned his wings and commission as second lieutenant in September 1942. In the same year, he married Muriel Wiley with whom he would have a daughter.

=== World War II ===
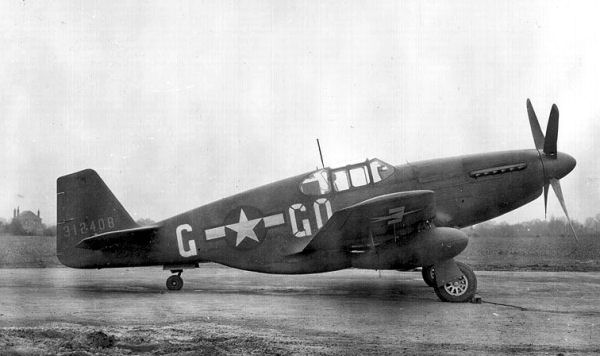
P-51B Mustang of the 355th Fighter Squadron

Gumm was assigned to the 355th Fighter Squadron of the 354th Fighter Group. In November 1943, the 354th FG arrived in the United Kingdom, and was assigned to RAF Boxted, where the group received the P-51B Mustangs, becoming the first fighter group to fly P-51s in aerial combat on December 11, when they flew a long-range bomber escort mission over Bremen, Germany. On December 16, 1943, the 354th FG again flew a bomber escort mission over Bremen. During the mission, Gumm and his flight encountered four Messerschmitt Bf 110s attempting to attack the bombers. Gumm closed on the Bf 110s and shot down one of them, becoming the first pilot to score an aerial victory in the P-51. He also damaged a Junkers Ju 88 on the same mission.

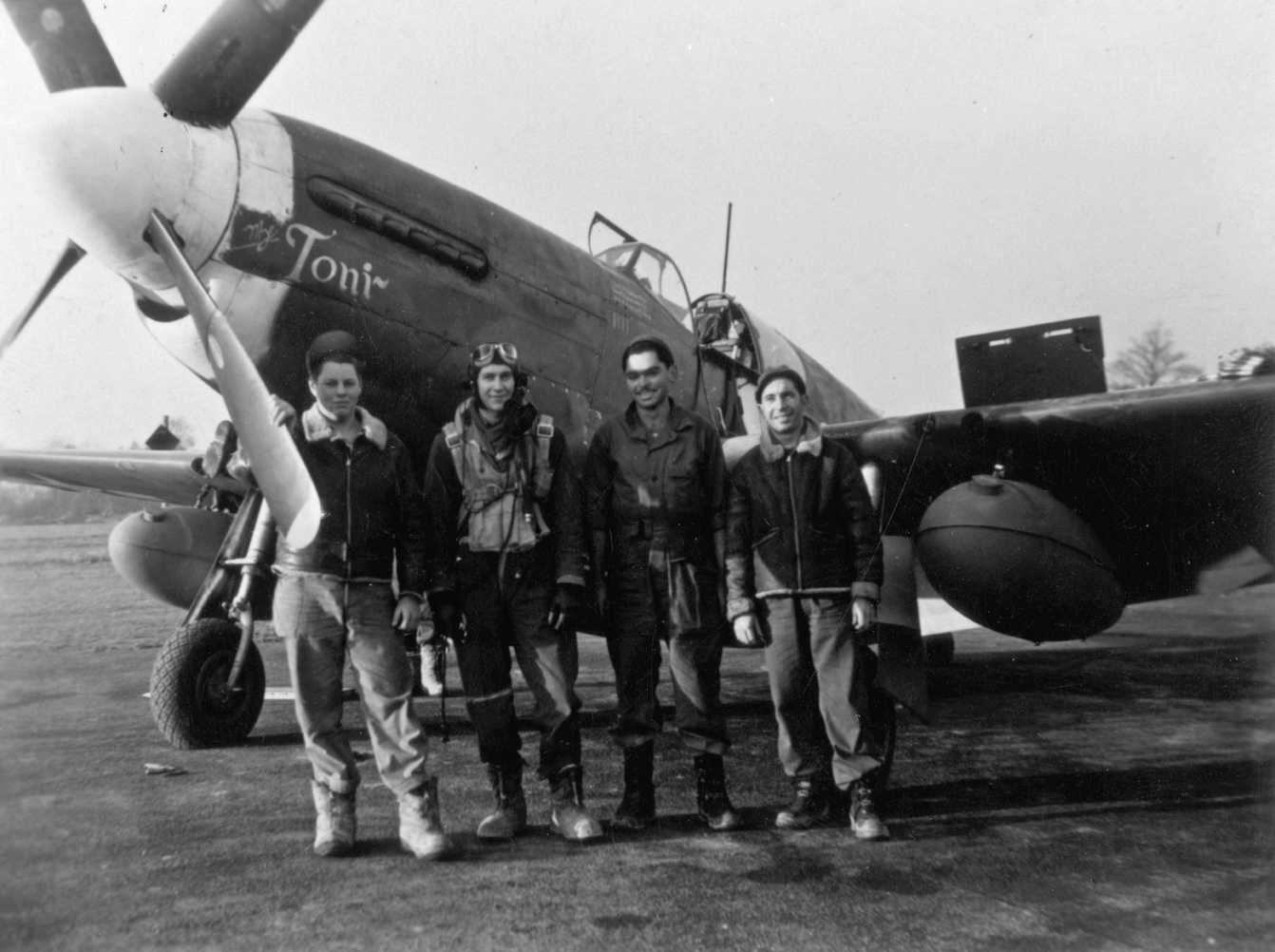
Gumm (second from left) and his crew chiefs standing next to his P-51B 'My Toni'

On January 29, 1944, Gumm shot down a Messerschmitt Bf 109 over Frankfurt, Germany, his second aerial victory. On February 11, he shot down a Messerschmitt Me 410 and Ju 88 over Frankfurt, bringing his total to four aerial victories. On February 21, during a bomber escort over Brunswick, Germany, Gumm shot down a Bf 110, his fifth aerial victory and became the first flying ace of the 354th FG and in the P-51. On February 25, he shot down a Bf 109 over Munich, his sixth and last aerial victory.

Gumm was credited with the destruction of 6 enemy aircraft in aerial combat plus 2 probable, and 8 damaged in aerial combat. While serving with the 354th FG, his P-51 was named after his wife and daughter, bearing the name "My Toni".

=== Death ===
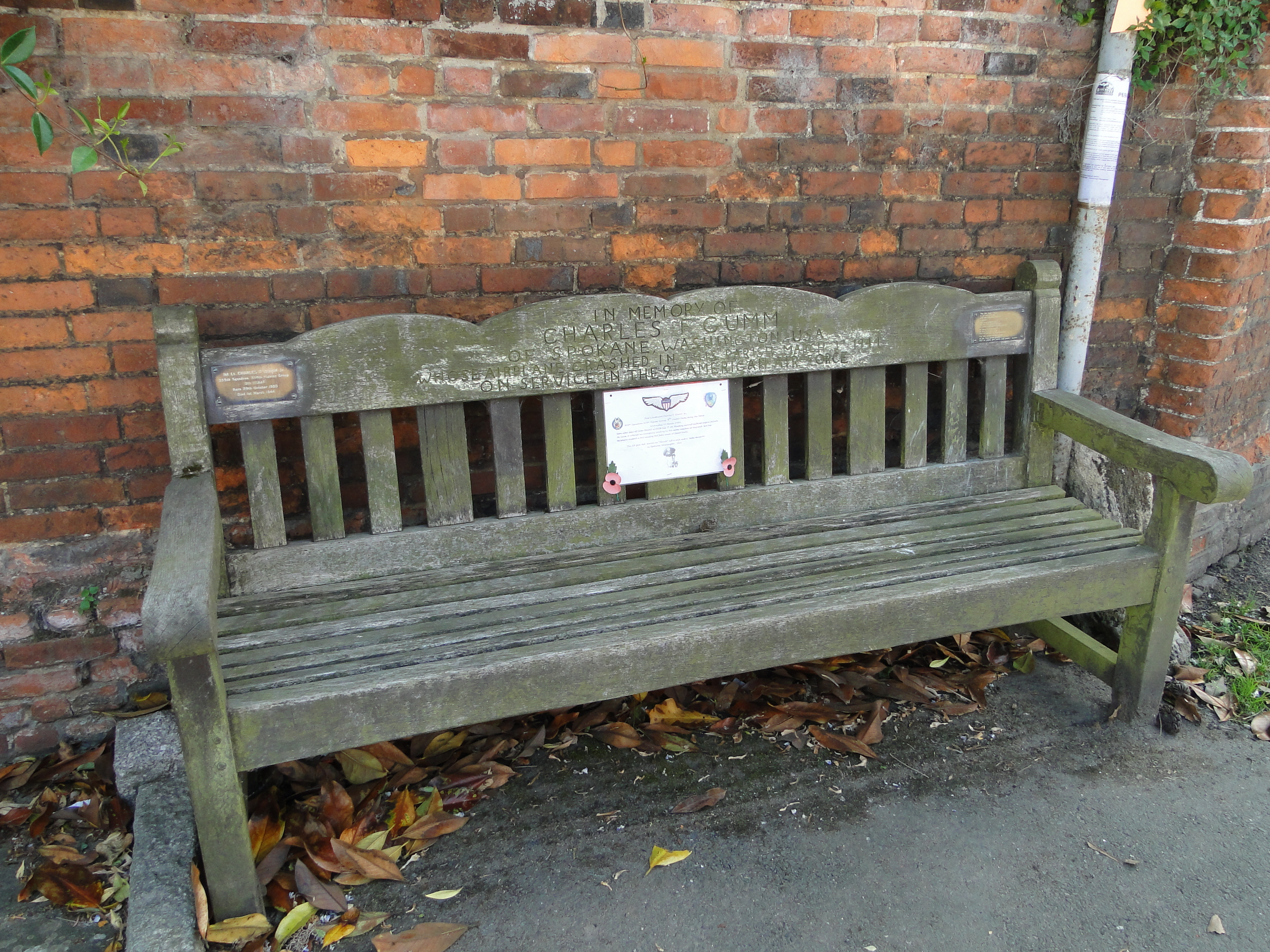
Memorial bench honoring Gumm at the courtyard of St. James Church in Nayland-with-Wissington

On March 1, 1944, Gumm took off from RAF Boxted for a training flight in his P-51. Moments later his aircraft encountered engine trouble. Gumm had the chance to bail out but as he was flying over the English town of Nayland, he did not want to be responsible for any civilian casualties if his P-51 were to crash. He remained in his stricken aircraft and while guiding it down to an open field, flew too low and struck a tree. The P-51 cartwheeled, throwing Gumm from the cockpit and killing him. He was buried at Greenwood Memorial Terrace in Spokane, Washington. In honor of Gumm's gallantry, the residents of Nayland installed a bench honoring Gumm. The bench consists of two brass plates with poem "The Life That I Have" by Leo Marks at the courtyard of St. James Church in Nayland-with-Wissington. In 2001, on the 57th anniversary of Gumm's death, a new bench honoring him was erected near the war memorial in the center of Nayland.

On March 1, 2024, the 80th anniversary of Gumm's death, the Royal British Legion joined villagers at Nayland war memorial to remember his heroism and gallantry. A wreath was laid and the legion standard was presented and lowered. A two-minute silence was observed to honour the young man who gave his life to save the village.

== Awards and decorations ==

Army Air Forces Pilot Badge
Silver Star		Distinguished Flying Cross
Soldier's Medal	Air Medal with three bronze oak leaf clusters	American Campaign Medal
European-African-Middle Eastern Campaign Medal with bronze campaign star	World War II Victory Medal	Croix de Guerre with Palm (France)

Army Presidential Unit Citation

== Aerial victory credits ==
Date	#	Type	Aircraft flown	Location	Unit assigned
December 16, 1943	1	Bf 110	P-51B	Bremen	355 FS, 354 FG
January 29, 1944	1	Bf 109	P-51B	Frankfurt	355 FS, 354 FG
February 11, 1944	1	Me 410	P-51B	Frankfurt	355 FS, 354 FG
February 11, 1944	1	Ju 88	P-51B	Frankfurt	355 FS, 354 FG
February 21, 1944	1	Bf 110	P-51B	Brunswick	355 FS, 354 FG
February 25, 1944	1	Bf 109	P-51B	Munich	355 FS, 354 FG
