= James H. Howard =

American fighter pilot in World War II

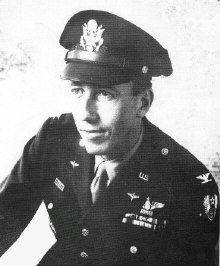
- Col. James H. Howard in 1945
- Born: April 8, 1913; Canton, Republic of China (now Guangzhou, Guangdong, China)
- Died: March 18, 1995 (aged 81); Bay Pines, Florida, U.S.
- Burial place: Arlington National Cemetery
- Alma mater: Pomona College
- Military career
- Allegiance: United States
- Branch: United States Air Force; United States Army Air Forces; American Volunteer Group; United States Navy
- Service years: 1938–1941 (USN); 1941–1942 (AVG); 1942–1966 (USAAF/USAF)
- Rank: Ensign (Navy); Brigadier General (Air Force)
- Commands: 356th Fighter Squadron; 354th Fighter Group; 96th Bombardment Wing
- Conflicts: World War II
- Awards: Medal of Honor; Distinguished Flying Cross (2); Bronze Star; Air Medal (10)

James Howell Howard (April 8, 1913 – March 18, 1995) was a general in the United States Air Force and one of just two fighter pilots in the European Theater of Operations in World War II to receive the Medal of Honor—the United States military's highest decoration. Howard was an ace in two operational theaters during World War II, with six kills over Asia with the Flying Tigers of the American Volunteer Group (AVG) in the Pacific, and six kills over Europe with the United States Army Air Forces. CBS commentator Andy Rooney, then a wartime reporter for Stars and Stripes, called Howard's exploits "the greatest fighter pilot story of World War II". In later life, Howard was a successful businessman, author, and airport director.

== Early life ==
Born on April 8, 1913, in Canton, China, where his American parents lived at the time while his ophthalmologist father was teaching eye surgery there, Howard returned with his family to St. Louis, Missouri, in 1927. After graduating from John Burroughs School in St. Louis, he earned a Bachelor of Arts degree from Pomona College in Claremont, California, in 1937, intending to follow his father into medicine. Shortly before graduation, however, Howard decided that the life of a Naval Aviator was more appealing than six years of medical school and internship, and he entered the United States Navy as a naval aviation cadet.

== Military career ==
=== United States Navy ===
Howard began his flight training in January 1938 at Naval Air Station Pensacola, earning his wings a year later. In 1939, he was assigned as a U.S. Navy pilot aboard the aircraft carrier USS Enterprise, based at Pearl Harbor, Hawaii.

=== Flying Tigers ===
In June 1941, he left the Navy to become a P-40 fighter pilot with the American Volunteer Group (AVG), the Flying Tigers, in Burma. Howard was assigned to the group's 2nd Squadron ("Panda Bears"). On January 3, 1942, Howard was part of a flight led by squadron leader Jack Newkirk, who led an attack on a Japanese-held Tak airfield near Raheng, Thailand. Upon arriving over the airfield, the flight saw three Nakajima Ki-27s on the ground and three in a landing pattern. Howard led a strafing run on the airfield, destroying the three Ki-27s, while his wingman Tex Hill shot down a Ki-27 that was attacking Howard. As Howard prepared to conduct a second strafing run, his P-40 was hit by enemy anti-aircraft fire. Howard managed to fly his aircraft with the rest of the flight to Rangoon, Burma. This mission was described in a 2006 episode of the History Channel series Dogfights.

On January 19, Howard and two other pilots were credited with shared destruction of a Mitsubishi Ki-21 bomber performing reconnaissance over Burma. On January 24, he shot down a Ki-27 over Rangoon. On July 4, Howard shot down a Ki-27 over Hengyang, China, while other AVG pilots shot down three more Ki-27s with no losses. The aerial battle over Hengyang was the last combat action of Flying Tigers before it was disbanded. In total, Howard flew 56 missions and shot down six Japanese warplanes. (Note: According to the USAAF, Howard officially is credited with 2.33 aerial victories and 3 ground victories during his time with the Flying Tigers. After the war, ground victories were not to be recognized by the USAAF.)

=== United States Army Air Forces ===
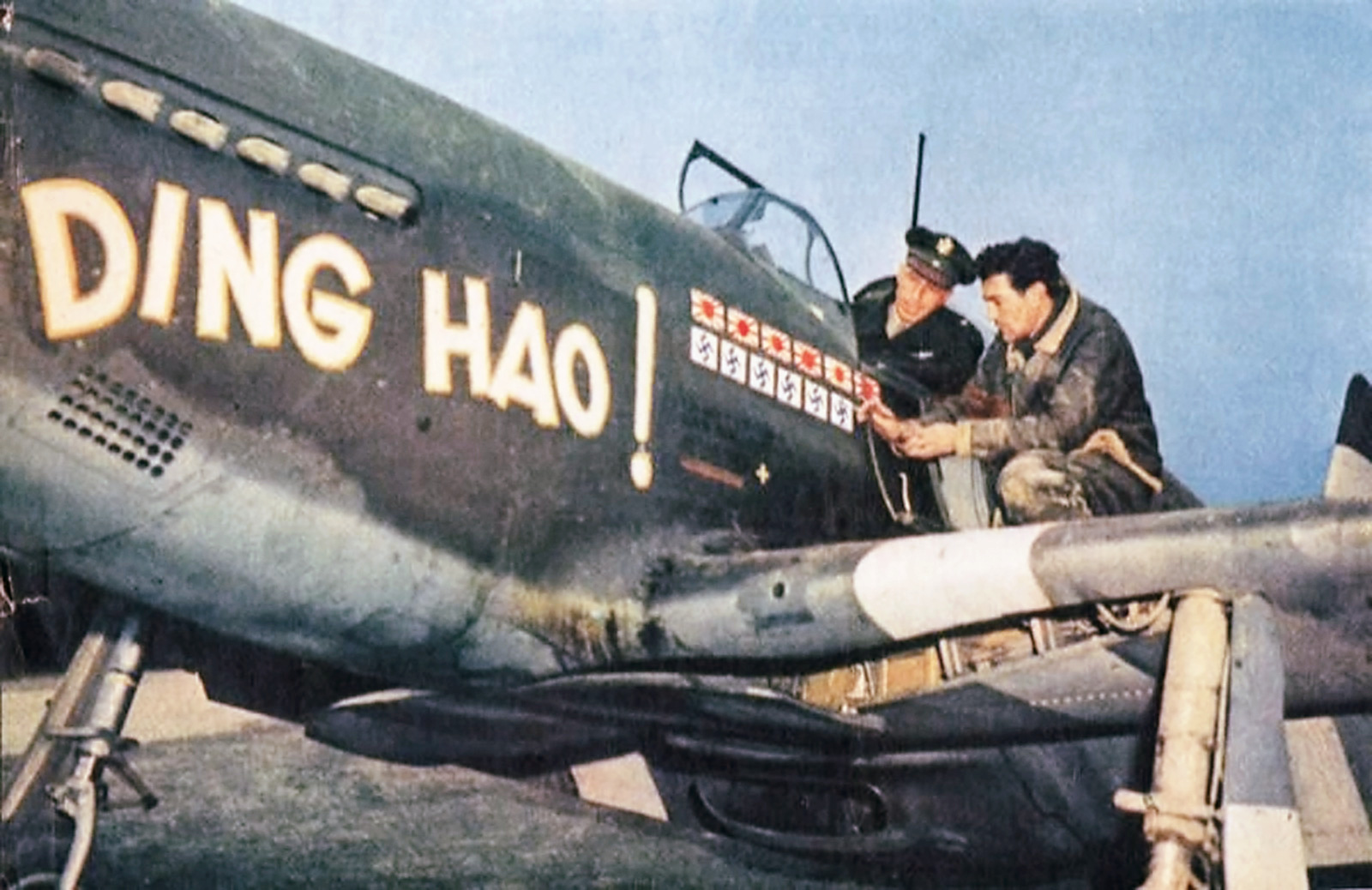
North American P-51B-5 Mustang (serial 43–6315) Ding Hao!, with James H. Howard, 1944 RAF Boxted, England

After the Flying Tigers were disbanded on July 4, 1942, Howard returned to the U.S. and was commissioned a captain in the Army Air Forces. In 1943, he was promoted to the rank of major and given command of the 356th Fighter Squadron in the 354th Fighter Group, based in the United Kingdom, flying North American P-51 Mustangs. On December 20, 1943, during an escort of American bombers over Bremen, Howard shot down a Messerschmitt Bf 109, his first aerial victory over Europe.

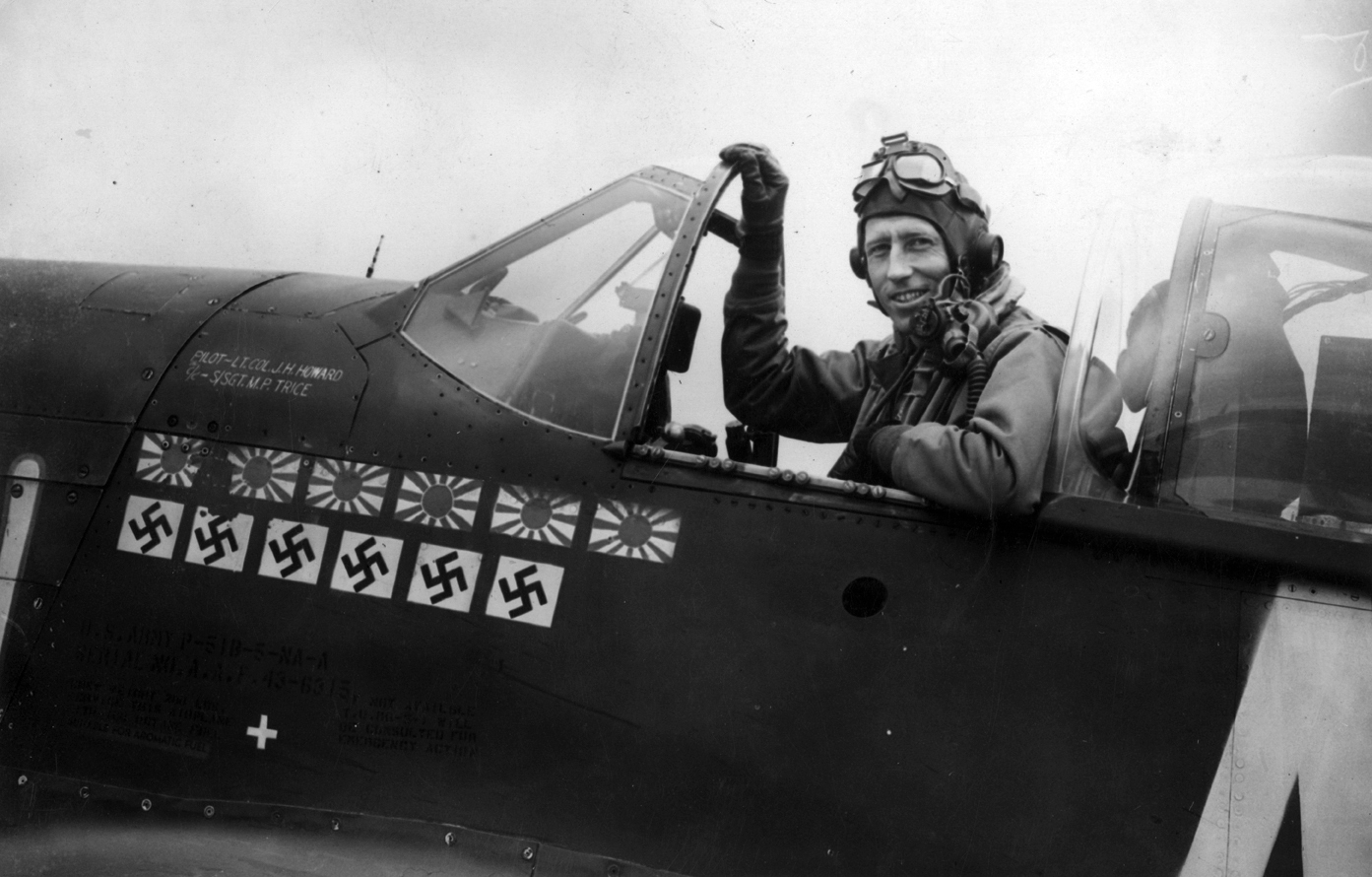
Howard with markings showing aerial victories

On January 11, 1944, Howard led three squadrons of 354th FG P-51s on an escort mission to support bombers on the target leg at Oschersleben, Germany. The bombers had completed their target run and were already in trouble when Howard spotted them. After sending the other two squadrons to protect middle and rearward bomber formations, Howard's squadron flew towards the lead formation and broke up into flights.

After the initial contact, Howard became separated from his flight and then from his wingman and flew unaccompanied into more than 30 Luftwaffe fighters that were attacking a formation of American Boeing B-17 Flying Fortress bombers. For more than a half-hour, Howard defended the heavy bombers of the 401st Bomb Group against the swarm of Luftwaffe fighters, repeatedly attacking the enemy and shooting down as many as six. Even after three of his four guns were out of action, he continued to dive on enemy airplanes. The leader of the bomber formation later reported, "For sheer determination and guts, it was the greatest exhibition I've ever seen. It was a case of one lone American against what seemed to be the entire Luftwaffe. He was all over the wing, across and around it. They can't give that boy a big enough award." However, none of this has ever been confirmed against German records and according to Air Force Historical Study 85, Howard was credited in destroying three enemy aircraft during the mission, which includes two twin-engine Messerschmitt Bf 110s and one Focke-Wulf Fw 190.

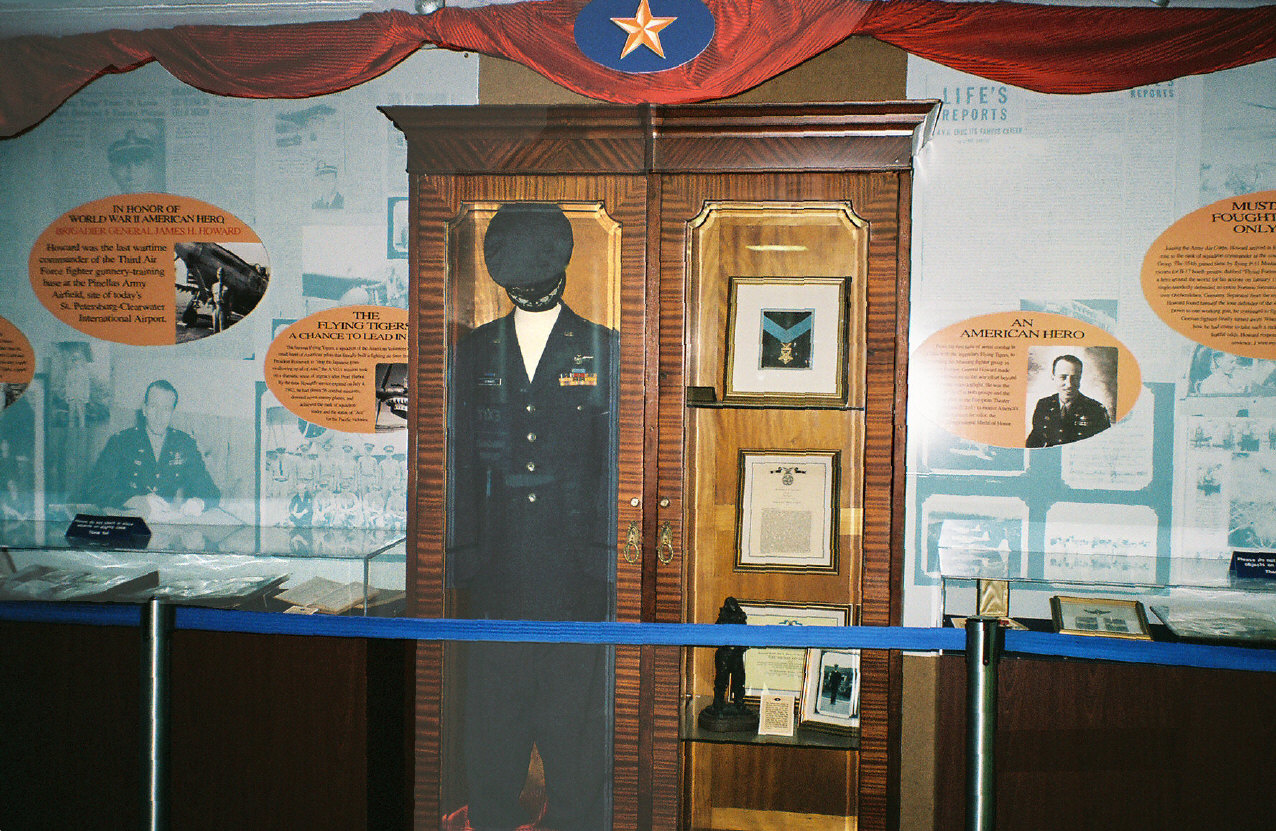
The Gen. Howard exhibit, including his Medal of Honor, at St. Petersburg-Clearwater International Airport

The following week, the Army Air Forces held a press conference in London at which Major Howard described the attack to reporters, including the BBC, the Associated Press, CBS reporter Walter Cronkite, and Andy Rooney (for Stars and Stripes). The story was a media sensation, prompting articles such as "Mustang Whip" in the Saturday Evening Post, "Fighting at 425 Miles Per Hour" in Popular Science, and "One Man Air Force" in True magazine. "An attack by a single fighter on four or five times his own number wasn't uncommon", wrote a fellow World War II fighter pilot in his postwar memoirs of Howard's performance, "but a deliberate attack by a single fighter against thirty-plus enemy fighters without tactical advantage of height or surprise is rare almost to the point of extinction." The following month, Howard was promoted to lieutenant colonel. On January 30, during a mission over Brunswick, he shot down another Bf 110 and on April 8, 1944, he shot down a Fw 190 over Brunswick, his last aerial victory of the war. In June 1944, he was presented the Medal of Honor by General Carl Spaatz for his January 11 valor. That same month, Howard helped direct fighter cover for the Allies' Normandy landings on D-Day. During the war, Howard was credited with eight aerial victories (2.33 over Asia and 6 over Europe) and three ground victories (in Asia), thus making him a flying ace. During his time with the 354th FG, he flew a P-51B Mustang, serial number 43-6315 nicknamed "Ding Hao". (Note: Chinese: 顶好; pinyin: Dǐng hǎo meaning "well done" or "very good", and was often used by Flying Tiger pilots in China.) In January 1945, Howard was promoted to colonel and assigned as base commander of Pinellas Army Airfield (now St. Petersburg-Clearwater International Airport) in Florida.

=== United States Air Force ===
With the establishment of the United States Air Force as a separate service in 1947, then-Colonel Howard was transferred to it. In 1948, he was promoted to the rank of brigadier general in the U.S. Air Force Reserve, commanding the Air Force Reserve's 96th Bombardment Group. He retired from the Air Forces Reserves in October 1966.

== Later years ==
Roar of the Tiger (1991) by James H. Howard

As a civilian after the war, Howard was Director of Aeronautics for St. Louis, Missouri, managing Lambert Field while maintaining his military status as a brigadier general in the United States Air Force Reserve. He later founded Howard Research, a systems engineering business, which he eventually sold to Control Data Corporation. He married Mary Balles in 1948 in a military wedding ceremony. They later divorced, and Howard then married Florence Buteau.

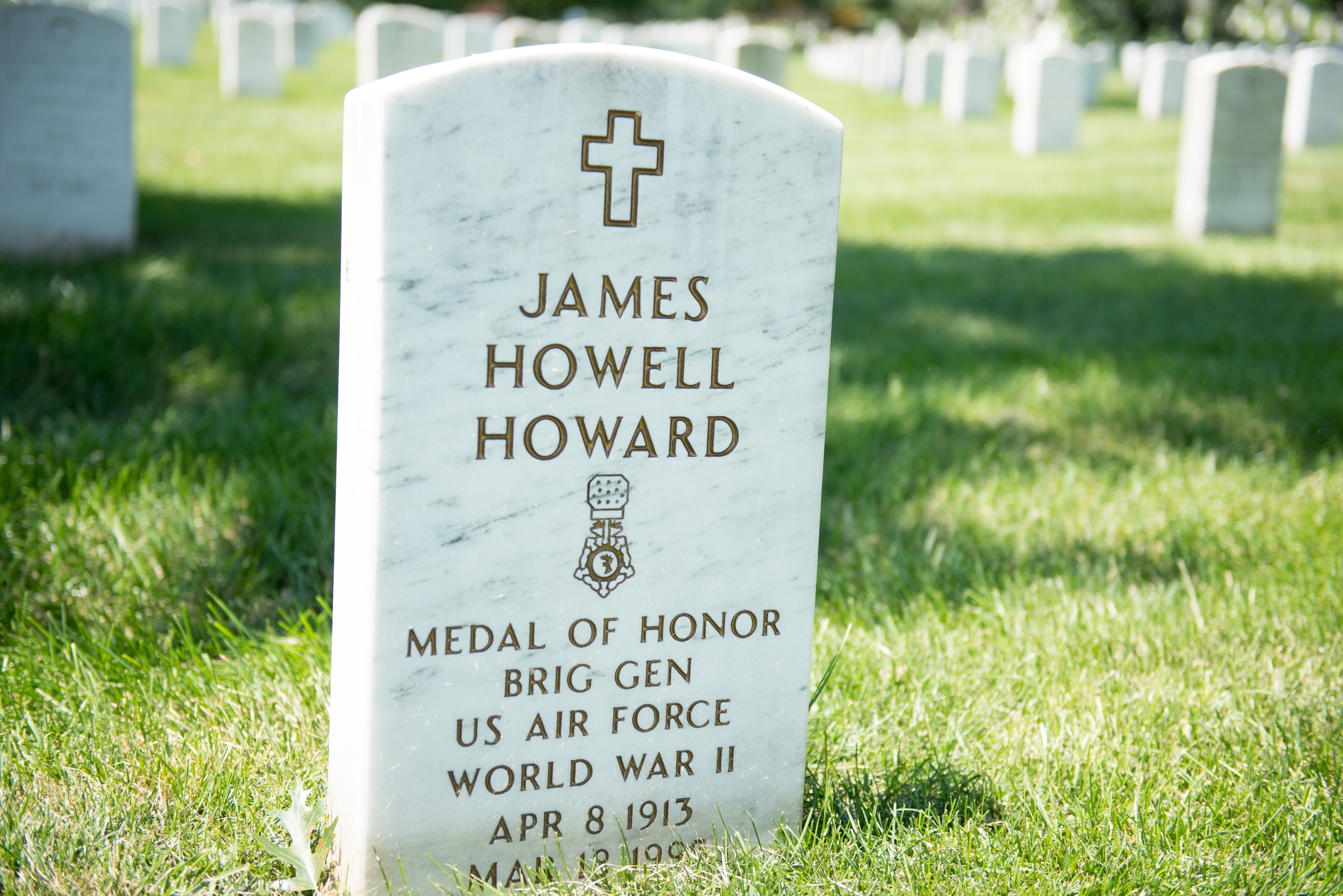
Grave at Arlington National Cemetery

In the 1970s, Howard retired to Belleair Bluffs in Pinellas County, Florida. In 1991, he wrote an autobiography, Roar of the Tiger, chiefly devoted to his wartime experiences. On January 11, 1994, the 50th anniversary of the Oschlersleben attack, the Board of County Commissioners in Pinellas County proclaimed "General Howard Day" and presented him with a plaque. A permanent exhibit honoring General Howard was also unveiled in the terminal building of the county's St. Petersburg-Clearwater International Airport. Another exhibit paying tribute to Howard was subsequently dedicated at his high school alma mater, John Burroughs School in St. Louis.

On January 27, 1995, Howard made his last public appearance when he was guest of honor at the annual banquet of the West Central Florida Council of the Boy Scouts of America, in Clearwater, Florida. He died six weeks later at the nearby Bay Pines Veterans Hospital, survived by two sisters. He is buried at Arlington National Cemetery.

== Honors ==
Howard Avenue in the Market Common District of Myrtle Beach, South Carolina, is named in tribute to Howard, who was a commander of the relocated 354th Fighter-Day Group at nearby Myrtle Beach Air Force Base. There is a memorial marker with photos and an inscription in Market Common Valor Memorial Garden at the intersection of Hackler Street and Howard Avenue: 33°40.062′N 78°56.368′W.

== Summary of aircraft destroyed ==
Aircraft destroyed:
Date	#	Type	Location	Aircraft flown	Unit assigned	Air/Ground
January 3, 1942	3	Nakajima Ki-27	Raheng, Thailand	P-40C	2 PS, AVG	Ground
January 19, 1942	0.15	Mitsubishi Ki-21	Mesoht, Burma	P-40C	AVG	Air
January 24, 1942	1	Ki-27	Yangon, Burma	P-40C	AVG	Air
July 4, 1942	1	Ki-27	Hengyang, China	P-40E	AVG	Air
December 20, 1943	1	Messerschmitt Bf 109	Bremen, Germany	P-51B Mustang	356 FS, 354 FG	Air
January 11, 1944	2; 1	Messerschmitt Bf 110; Focke-Wulf Fw 190	Oschersleben, Germany	P-51B	356 FS, 354 FG	Air
January 30, 1944	1	Bf 110	Brunswick, Germany	P-51B	356 FS, 354 FG	Air
April 8, 1944	1	Fw 190	Brunswick, Germany	P-51B	354 FG	Air

== Military awards ==
Howard received the following awards:

Badge	U.S. Air Force Command pilot badge		
1st row	Medal of Honor		Distinguished Flying Cross with oak leaf cluster
2nd row	Bronze Star Medal	Air Medal with eight oak leaf clusters	Air Medal
3rd row	Air Force Presidential Unit Citation	American Defense Service Medal with service star	American Campaign Medal
4th row	Asiatic-Pacific Campaign Medal with two campaign stars	European–African–Middle Eastern Campaign Medal with two campaign stars	World War II Victory Medal
5th row	National Defense Service Medal with service star	Air Force Longevity Service Award with four bronze oak leaf clusters	Armed Forces Reserve Medal with silver hourglass device

Foreign Awards	Order of the Sacred Tripod; 6th Grade (Republic of China)	Order of the Cloud and Banner; 6th Grade (Republic of China)	China War Memorial Medal (Republic of China)

=== Medal of Honor citation ===
The citation accompanying the Medal of Honor awarded to Lieutenant Colonel James H. Howard on 5 June 1944, by Lieutenant General Carl Spaatz reads:

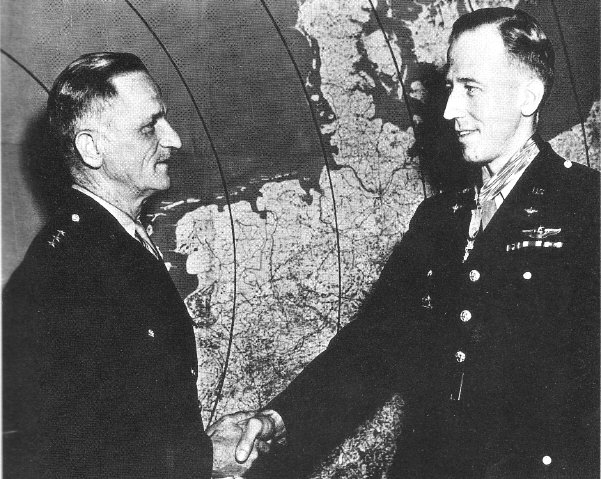
Howard receiving the Medal of Honor from Lieutenant General Carl Spaatz

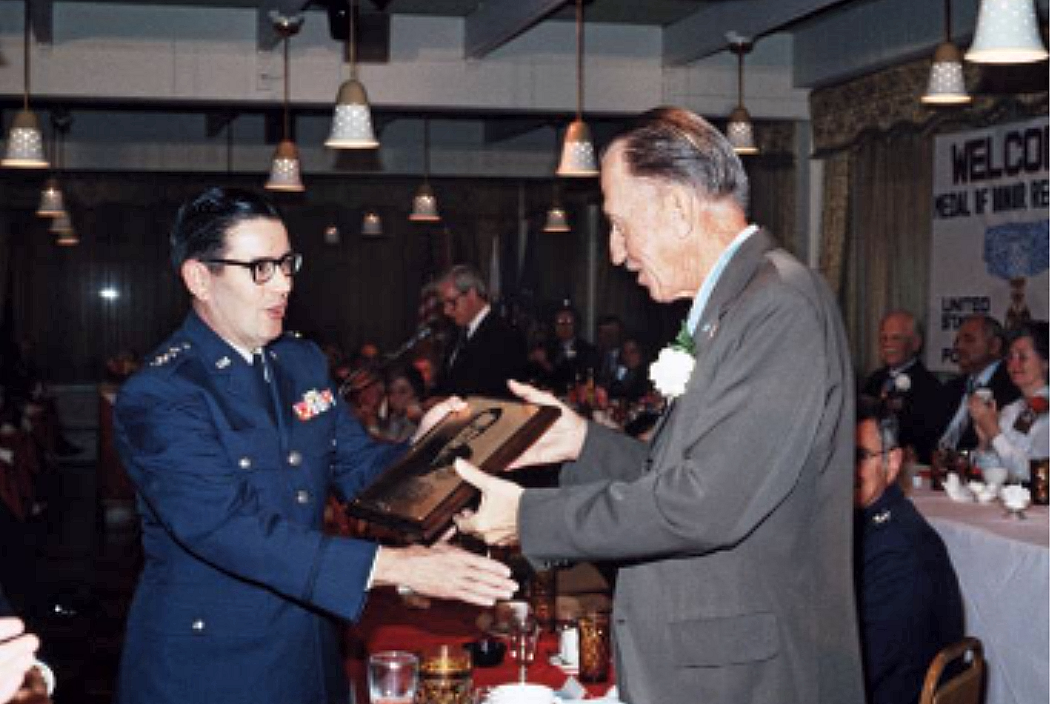
Howard presented with a plaque at a 1982 reunion of Air Force Medal of Honor recipients

For conspicuous gallantry and intrepidity above and beyond the call of duty in action with the enemy near Oschersleben, Germany, on 11 January 1944. On that day Col. Howard was the leader of a group of P-51 aircraft providing support for a heavy bomber formation on a long-range mission deep in enemy territory. As Col. Howard's group met the bombers in the target area the bomber force was attacked by numerous enemy fighters. Col. Howard, with his group, at once engaged the enemy and himself destroyed a German ME. 110. As a result of this attack Col. Howard lost contact with his group, and at once returned to the level of the bomber formation. He then saw that the bombers were being heavily attacked by enemy airplanes and that no other friendly fighters were at hand. While Col. Howard could have waited to attempt to assemble his group before engaging the enemy, he chose instead to attack single-handed a formation of more than 30 German airplanes. With utter disregard for his own safety he immediately pressed home determined attacks for some 30 minutes, during which time he destroyed 3 enemy airplanes and probably destroyed and damaged others. Toward the end of this engagement 3 of his guns went out of action and his fuel supply was becoming dangerously low. Despite these handicaps and the almost insuperable odds against him, Col. Howard continued his aggressive action in an attempt to protect the bombers from the numerous fighters. His skill, courage, and intrepidity on this occasion set an example of heroism which will be an inspiration to the U.S. Armed Forces.

== See also ==
- List of Medal of Honor recipients
- List of Medal of Honor recipients for World War II
