= James F. Hackler =

United States Air Force general

James F. Hackler, Jr.
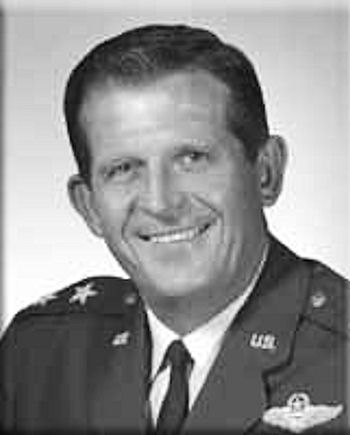
- Major General James F Hackler Jr
- Born: September 8, 1920; Marion, Virginia
- Died: November 22, 2007 (aged 87); Myrtle Beach, South Carolina
- Military career
- Allegiance: United States
- Branch: United States Army Air Forces; United States Air Force
- Service years: 1943–1969
- Rank: Major General
- Awards: Silver Star Legion of Merit Distinguished Flying Cross with oak leaf cluster Air Medal with 20 oak leaf clusters Army Commendation Medal Air Force Commendation Medal French Croix de Guerre with Silver Gilt Star.

Major General James Franklin Hackler Jr. (September 8, 1920 – November 22, 2007) was a United States Air Force general.

He graduated from New Hanover High School, Wilmington, North Carolina, in 1937; attended Riverside Military Academy, Gainesville, Georgia, during 1937–1938, and the University of North Carolina, Chapel Hill, North Carolina, during 1938–1939. He graduated from the United States Military Academy in 1943, with the first class in which some members received both a commission and pilot wings.

His first assignment was to Spence Field, Ga., for additional fighter-pursuit training. He then was assigned to the 358th Fighter Group and in 1943 went with it to the European Theater of Operations, where he served as pilot, squadron commander and then group operations officer in England, France and Germany. In 1945 he became an operations staff officer for the XII Tactical Air Command in Germany, He remained in Europe after World War II as a P-51 Mustang squadron commander with the 357th Fighter Group stationed at Neubiberg, Germany.

In 1947, he was assigned to the Pentagon for duty with the Deputy Chief of Staff, Personnel, Headquarters U.S. Air Force. In 1950, he went to Headquarters, Ninth Air Force, at Pope Air Force Base, N.C., where he served as chief of the Fighter Training Division and then as executive to the Deputy Chief of Staff, Operations. The following year, he went to the 50th Tactical Fighter Wing, Clovis Air Force Base, New Mexico, as commander of an F-86 Sabre squadron.

General Hackler returned to Europe in 1953, where he served in West Germany as commander of the 50th Tactical Fighter Group, and then director of operations and training, Headquarters, Twelfth Air Force. He next attended the NATO Defense College in Paris, France.

In September 1956, he returned to the United States and went to Myrtle Beach Air Force Base, South Carolina, where as commander of the 354th Fighter-Day Group he delivered the first F-100 Super Sabre to the group in October 1956. A year later, he became director of operations for the 354th Tactical Fighter Wing, and in this position was instrumental in the development of a worldwide deployment capability as part of Tactical Air Command's Composite Air Strike Force.

General Hackler returned to Washington, D.C., and in 1960 graduated from the National War College, and was assigned to the Directorate of Operational Requirements in Headquarters, U.S. Air Force. From January 1962 to April 1964, he served in the Office of the Secretary of Defense, working on research and development of tactical warfare programs.

After completion of F-105D Thunderchief pilot training at Nellis Air Force Base, Nevada, General Hackler returned to West Germany in August 1964 and assumed command of the 36th Tactical Fighter Wing at Bitburg Air Base. The wing converted to F-4D Phantom II aircraft during his command. Two years later, he was appointed assistant deputy chief of staff, operations, for U.S. Air Forces in Europe with headquarters at Wiesbaden Air Base.

In June 1967, General Hackler became deputy director of information, Office of the Secretary of the Air Force. His duties included internal information, public information, community relations and related activities.

General Hackler retired from the United States Air Force on April 1, 1969. He died living in Myrtle Beach, South Carolina on November 22, 2007.
