= Herzogenaurach Airport =

Regional airport in Germany

Herzogenaurach Airport Advanced Landing Ground R-29
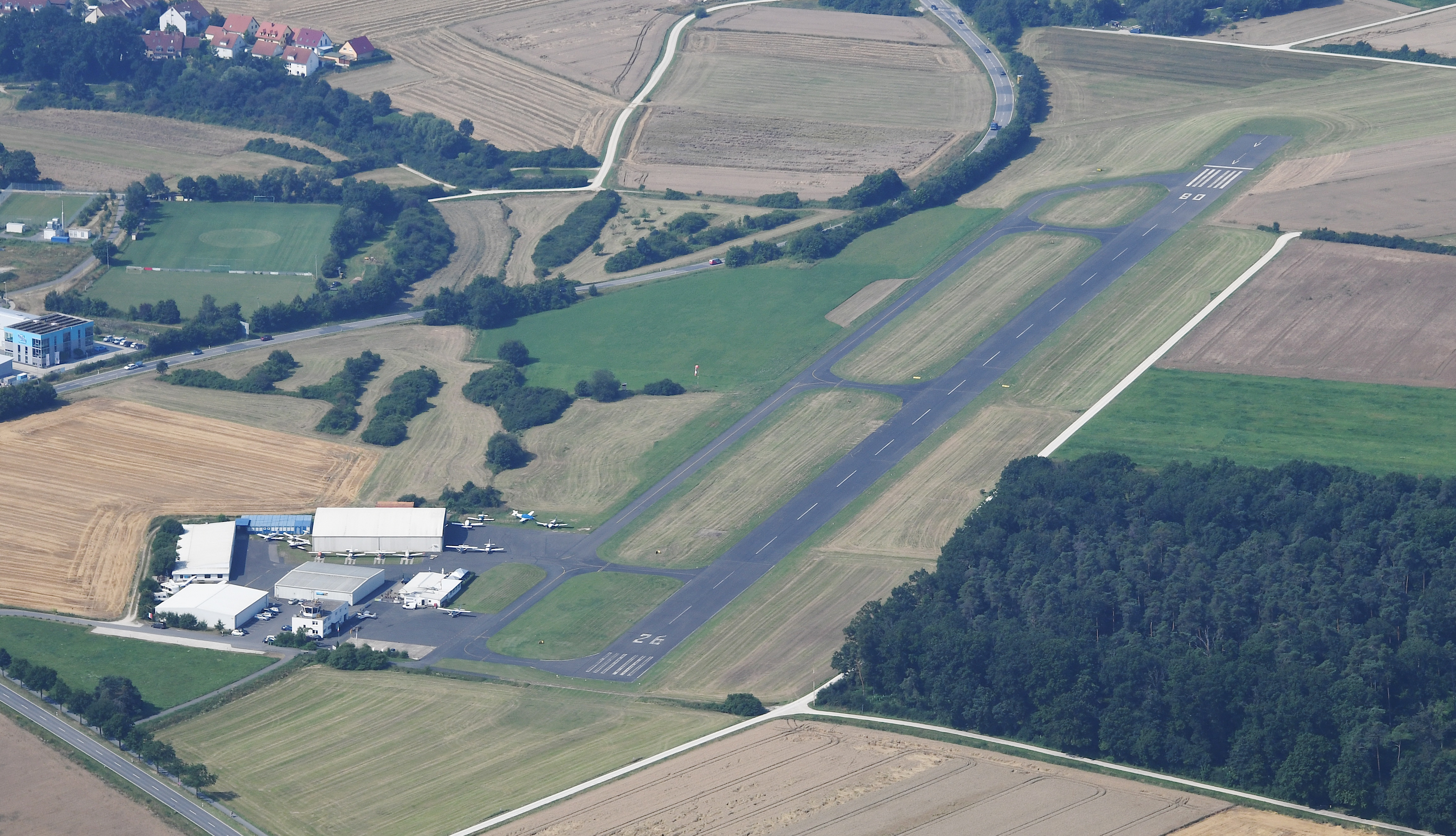
- IATA: none; ICAO: EDQH

Summary
- Airport type: Public
- Location: Herzogenaurach, Germany
- Elevation AMSL: 1,070 ft / 326 m
- Coordinates: 49°34′57″N 010°52′42″E

Map

Runways
| Direction | Length | | Surface |
| Direction | ft | m | Surface |
|---|---|---|---|
| 07/25 | 2,296 | 700 | Asphalt |

Herzogenaurach Airport (ICAO: EDQH) is a regional airport in Germany, about 3 miles (5 km) north of Herzogenaurach (Bavaria); about 230 miles (370 km) southwest of Berlin

It supports general aviation with no commercial airline service scheduled.

== History ==
The Luftwaffe opened a fighter airfield in Herzogenaurach in 1936, the facility primarily an organizational and equipping facility, with the units moving out after being formed to their operational bases. During World War II, the airfield was assigned to the Defense of the Reich campaign in 1943, with several Messerschmitt Bf 109 day and night interceptor units being assigned to the airfield.

American Army units moved into the Herzogenaurach area in mid-April 1945 during the Western Allied Invasion of Germany and seized the airfield on 18 April 1945 with little or no opposition. Combat engineers from the IX Engineering Command cleared wreckage and mines left by the retreating German forces and opened the airfield the next day as Advanced Landing Ground "R-29". C-47 Skytrain transports immediately began using the airfield to fly in supplies to the advancing ground forces and to evacuate wounded to the rear areas. Eventually a pierced steel planking runway was laid down to support combat operations, however the war ended before any operations were flown from the field.

With the German Capitulation on 7 May, the airfield was redesignated as Army Air Force Station Herzogenaurach and for the next year was used by the 354th Fighter Group as an occupation Garrison, being joined in June by the 320th Bombardment Group also performing occupation duty. The Air Force units moved out in February 1946, the facility being turned over to the United States Army as part of their garrison in the Nürnberg Military Area. The airfield was renamed as Herzo-Base and until 1992, used the facility primarily as a radar station.

The American forces pulled out of Herzogenaurach in 1992 as part of the drawdown of forces after the end of the Cold War, and the facility was returned to the German Government. After the pullout, a new civil airport was built primarily for use by Adidas, which moved its headquarters back into Herzogenaurach. The vacant military facilities were torn down and redeveloped into an extension of the company's headquarters.
