= Orconte Airfield =

World War II military airfield in Marne, France

Orconte Airfield Advanced Landing Ground (ALG) A-66

- Champagne-Ardenne Region, France Orconte Airfield (France)

Site information
- Type: Military airfield
- Controlled by: United States Army Air Forces

Location
- Coordinates: 48°40′14″N 004°44′10″E

Site history
- Built by: IX Engineering Command
- In use: September–December 1944
- Materials: Prefabricated Hessian Surfacing (PHS)

Orconte Airfield is an abandoned World War II military airfield, which is located near the commune of Orconte in the Marne department of northern France.

Located probably north of the commune, it was a United States Army Air Force temporary airfield established during the Northern France Campaign in September 1944. Its primary use was for P-47 Thunderbolt fighters of the Ninth Air Force 354th Fighter Group.

== History ==
Known as Advanced Landing Ground "A-66", the airfield consisted of a single 5000' Prefabricated Hessian Surfacing (PHS) runway aligned 11/29. In addition, with tents were used for billeting and also for support facilities; an access road was built to the existing road infrastructure; a dump for supplies, ammunition, and gasoline drums, along with a drinkable water and minimal electrical grid for communications and station lighting.

Combat units stationed at the airfield were the 354th Fighter Group, between 14 September-16 October 1944 which flew support missions during the Allied invasion of Normandy, patrolling roads in front of the beachhead; strafing German military vehicles and dropping bombs on gun emplacements, anti-aircraft artillery and concentrations of German troops when spotted.

After the Americans moved east with the advancing Allied Armies, the airfield was used for transport of supplies and evacuating combat casualties. It was closed on 1 December 1944, and the land was returned to its owners. Today there is little or no physical evidence of its existence or its location.

== See also ==
- Advanced Landing Ground
