= Glenn T. Eagleston =

United States Air Force officer

Glenn Todd Eagleston
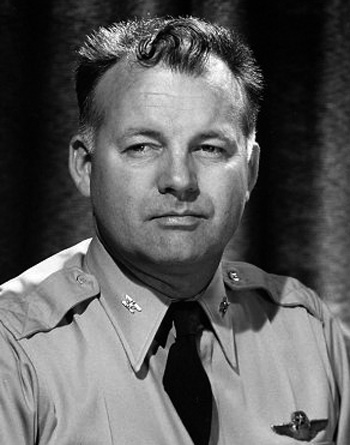
- Colonel Glenn T. Eagleston in the 1960s
- Born: March 12, 1921; Farmington, Utah, U.S.
- Died: May 7, 1991 (aged 70)
- Burial place: Arlington National Cemetery
- Military career
- Allegiance: United States of America
- Branch: United States Air Force
- Service years: 1940–1967
- Rank: Colonel
- Units: 354th Fighter Group; 4th Fighter Interceptor Group
- Commands: 353rd Fighter Squadron; Dow Field; 334th Fighter-Interceptor Squadron; 4th Fighter-Interceptor Group; 103rd Fighter-Interceptor Group; 4750th Training Group; 6313th Air Base Wing; 4756th Air Defense Group; 2478th AFRS
- Conflicts: World War II; Korean War
- Awards: Distinguished Service Cross; Silver Star; Legion of Merit; Distinguished Flying Cross (4); Bronze Star Medal; Air Medal (27)

Glenn Todd Eagleston (March 12, 1921 – May 7, 1991) was a career officer in the United States Air Force and the leading ace of Ninth Air Force in Europe in World War II. Eagleston was credited with 18 1/2 victories, two probable victories, and seven damaged German aircraft. He also destroyed at least five enemy aircraft on the ground, while flying P-51 Mustangs with the 354th Fighter Group.

Eagleston was known as a "fighter pilot's fighter pilot." He flew almost 100 combat missions in the P-51 Mustangs and P-47 Thunderbolts in Europe, some as a 22-year-old Squadron Commander. He also flew in Korea; he was assigned there as Squadron and Group Commander, flying F-86s for 84 combat missions and being credited with two MiG-15s destroyed, one probable, and seven damaged.

== Early life ==
He was born in Farmington, Utah on March 12, 1921, and joined the US Army Air Corps as an enlisted man in 1940. He became an aviation cadet in 1942, graduating at Luke Field in September and assigned as a second lieutenant.

== Military career ==
=== World War II ===
After a brief stint with the 79th Fighter Squadron of the 20th Fighter Group flying the P-39 Airacobra from September 1942 to January 1943, he was transferred to the 353rd Fighter Squadron of the 354th Fighter Group and deployed with that group to England in October 1943, flying P-51 Mustangs.

The 354th Fighter Group, dubbed "Pioneers," were equipped with the P-51B Mustangs in November 1943 and was loaned to the Eighth Air Force for bomber escort duty, where Donald Blakeslee served as the temporary commanding officer of the group. On December, the 354th FG began flying missions over France. The 354th flew through the bad winter weather of 1943–44, typically dividing its three squadrons into four color-coded flights of four planes each.

On January 5, 1944, the 354th was covering bomber withdrawal from Kiel when they engaged a formation of Luftwaffe fighters. Eagleston shot down an Fw 190 with a short burst, at 45 degrees of deflection. The aircraft crashed into the ground, crediting Eagleston with his first aerial victory. On the same mission, the 354th FG shot down 18 enemy aircraft. Eagleston flew escort missions regularly, and his score increased: a Bf 110 on January 30, single Bf 110's on both February 21 and 22, and a Bf 109 on March 6, making him a flying ace.

The 354th resumed its original tactical role in Spring 1944, in preparation for D-Day. In mid-June, following the Allied invasion of Normandy, the 354th FG moved to Cricqueville-en-Bessin, an advanced base in Normandy and simultaneously returned to the Ninth Air Force command. By this time Eagleston had 8 1/2 kills and had been promoted to captain. Finishing his first combat, he was sent for back to the US for shore leave and returned to active duty in the fall 1944. His biggest day was on October 29, 1944, when he destroyed three Bf 109s in a half-hour dogfight, for which he received the Distinguished Service Cross.

In October 1944, Eagleston took command of the 353rd Fighter Squadron, now equipped with P-47D Thunderbolts and flew their first mission on November 26, 1944, and continued to fly close-support, armed-reconnaissance, fighter-sweep, dive-bombing, strafing, and escort missions. On February 16, 1945, the 353rd Fighter Squadron began flying the P-51 Mustangs again.

Eagleston was credited with 18 1/2 victories, two probable victories, and seven damaged German aircraft. He also destroyed at least five enemy aircraft on the ground. During his time in the 354th FG, he flew P-51 Mustang named "Feeble Eagle".

=== Post-war ===
He served as assistant director of operations and training at Dover Field from February to June 1946, and then as commander of Dow Field from July to September 1946. Eagleston completed Jet Fighter Pilot School at Williams Field in January 1947, and then served at Newark, until February 1949.

He served as Operations Officer for the 33rd Fighter Group at Otis Air Base from February to July 1949, and then attended Air Command and Staff School at Maxwell Air Force Base, from July 1949 to January 1950. He was then made commander of the 60th Fighter Squadron at Otis Air Base, where he served until November 1950.

=== Korean War ===
Eagleston became commander of the 334th Fighter Interceptor Squadron in Korea. He became commander of the 4th Fighter Interceptor Group in May 1951. During the Korean War, he was credited with destroying two MiG-15s, bringing his two-war total to 20.5 enemy aircraft destroyed in aerial combat.

He flew 84 missions and damaged seven and one probable. On December 22, 1950, he downed his first MiG-15 over the Yalu River, wounding the pilot. On 22 April 1951, he claimed his second MiG-15 which, in fact, probably survived.

Eagleston's F-86A was badly damaged by a MiG-15 flown by Sergei Kramarenko on June 17, 1951, and he belly-landed at Kimpo Air Base. The jet was damaged beyond repair and was written off. The leader of the two Sabres who came to assist Eagleston was also a notable combat pilot: Lt.Col. Bruce Hinton, the first Sabre pilot to shoot down a MiG-15 on December 17, 1950. Eagleston returned to the United States in September 1951.

=== Post-Korean War ===
He next served as commander of the 103rd Fighter-Interceptor Group and then Deputy Base Commander at Suffolk County Air Base, from September 1951 to April 1952. He was Director of Operations and Training at Headquarters Eastern Air Defense Force at Stewart Air Base, from April 1952 to October 1953, when he became commander of the 4750th Training Group at Vincent Air Base.

Eagleston became Deputy Commander of the 4750th Air Defense Wing, also at Vincent AFB, in June 1955, and then served as Director of Operations of the 313th Air Division followed by duty as commander of the 6313th Air Base Wing, both at Kadena Air Base, until July 1960. He was next made Base Commander for the 4756th Air Defense Group at Tyndall Air Base, where he served from July 1960 to April 1962.

This was followed by duty as Deputy Commander and then Commander of the 2478th AFRS at Long Beach Municipal Airport from April 1962 to July 1965, when he was made Director of Maintenance for the 25th Air Division at McChord Air Base. His final assignment was as Director of Material for Seattle Air Defense Sector at McChord Air Base, from February 1966 until his retirement from the Air Force on February 28, 1967.

== Later life ==
Eagleston died on May 7, 1991. He is buried at Arlington National Cemetery.

== Awards and decorations ==
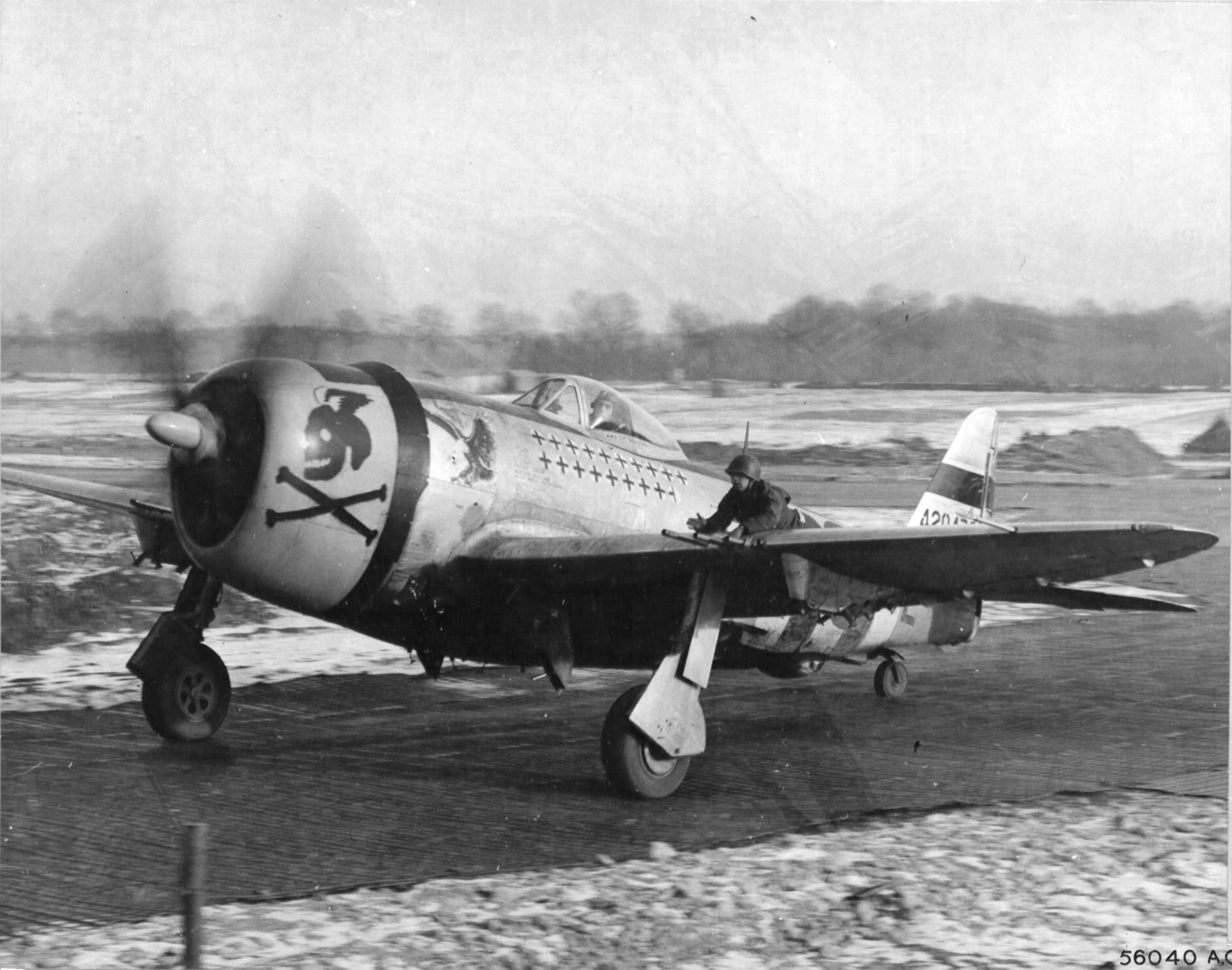
P-47D Thunderbolt of the 353rd Fighter Squadron flown by Maj Glenn T Eagleston, Squadron Commanding Officer and top ace of 9th Air Force with 18.5 kills, Rosieres en Haye Airbase, France, Feb 1945. United States National Archives.

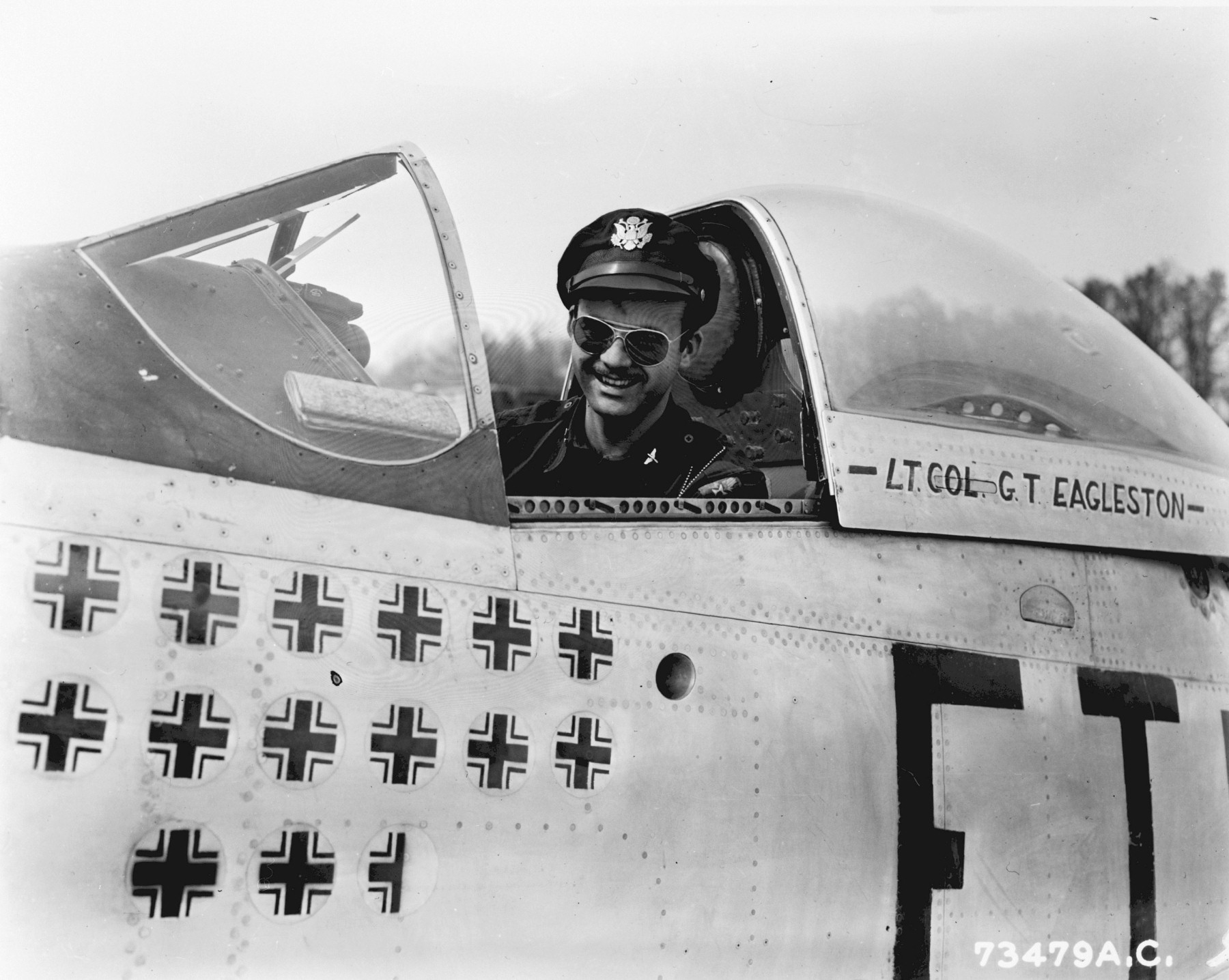
Eagleston in his P-51 Mustang

Command Pilot

Distinguished Service Cross
Silver Star
Legion of Merit
Distinguished Flying Cross with three bronze oak leaf clusters
Bronze Star Medal
Air Medal with four silver oak leaf clusters
Air Medal with silver oak leaf cluster (second ribbon required for accouterment spacing)
Air Force Commendation Medal with one oak leaf cluster
Air Force Presidential Unit Citation with silver oak leaf cluster
Air Force Outstanding Unit Award
Army Good Conduct Medal
American Defense Service Medal
American Campaign Medal
European-African-Middle Eastern Campaign Medal with one silver and three bronze campaign stars
World War II Victory Medal
Army of Occupation Medal
National Defense Service Medal with one bronze service star
Korean War Service Medal with one silver campaign star

Air Force Longevity Service Award with silver oak leaf cluster

Small Arms Expert Marksmanship Ribbon

Croix de Guerre with Palm (France)

Republic of Korea Presidential Unit Citation

United Nations Service Medal

Korean War Service Medal

=== Distinguished Service Cross citation ===

Eagleston, Glenn
Captain, U.S Army Air Forces
353rd Fighter Squadron, 354th Fighter Group, 9th Air Force
Date of Action: October 29, 1944
Headquarters, U.S. Strategic Forces in Europe: General Orders No. 13 (1945)
Citation:

Captain (Air Corps) Glenn T. Eagleston, United States Army Air Forces, was awarded the Distinguished Service Cross for extraordinary heroism in connection with military operations against an armed enemy while serving as Pilot of a P-51 Fighter Airplane in the 353d Fighter Squadron, 354th Fighter Group, Ninth Air Force, in aerial combat against enemy forces on 29 October 1944, in the European Theater of Operations. On this date Captain Eagleston shot down three enemy aircraft in a single mission. Captain Eagleston's unquestionable valor in aerial combat is in keeping with the highest traditions of the military service and reflects great credit upon himself, the 9th Air Force, and the United States Army Air Forces.
