= Headcorn Aerodrome =

Headcorn Aerodrome (RAF Lashenden) (USAAF Station AAF-410)
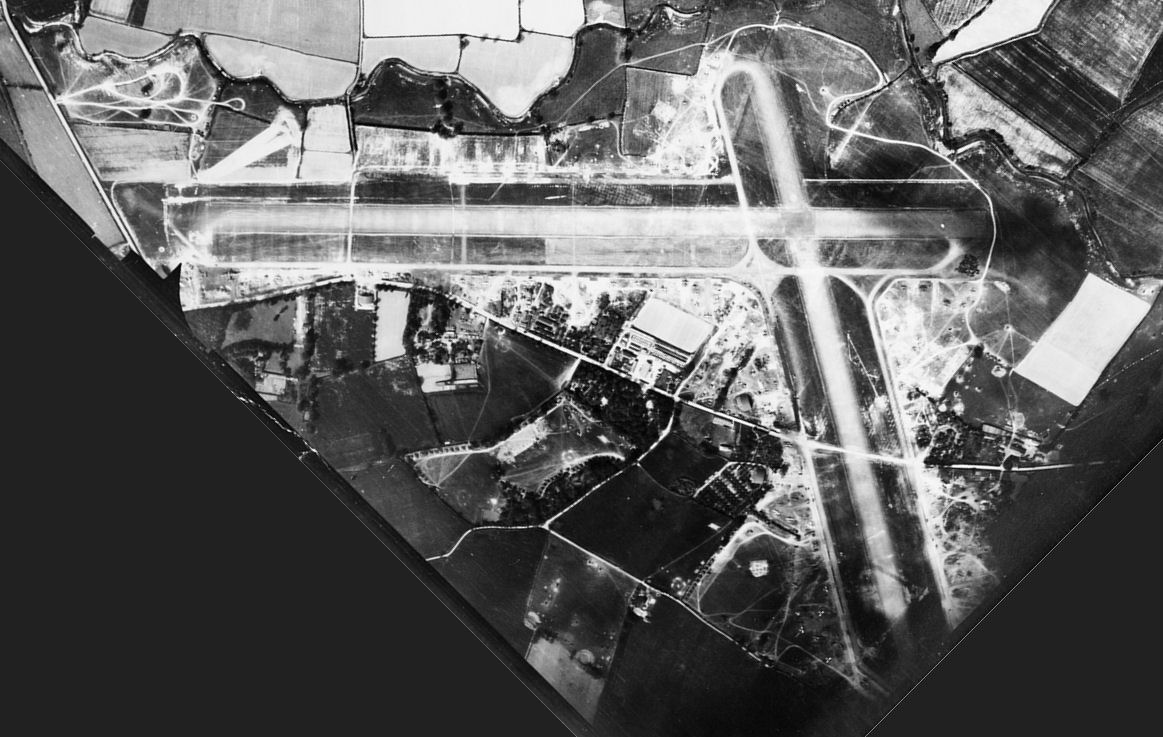
- Aerial photograph of RAF Lashenden (Headcorn) ALG Airfield oriented north, P-51 Mustangs of the 354th Fighter Group are parked on grass around the perimeter, 22 May 1944.
- IATA: none; ICAO: EGKH

Summary
- Airport type: Private
- Operator: Mr. J.P.A. Freeman
- Location: Ashford, Kent
- Elevation AMSL: 70 ft / 21 m
- Coordinates: 51°09′24″N 000°38′33″E

Map
- Location in Kent

Runways
Direction	Length		Surface
Direction	m	ft	Surface
10/28	1,100	2,621	Grass
03/21; Unlicensed	n/a	n/a	n/a
- Sources: UK AIP at NATS

Headcorn Aerodrome (ICAO: EGKH) is a private airfield in Kent, England. The airfield is located 8 NM (15 km; 9.2 mi) south of Maidstone; about 32 miles (51 km) southeast of London.

Opened in 1943 during the Second World War, it was named RAF Lashenden. It became a prototype for the temporary Advanced Landing Ground airfields that were built in France after D-Day, when the need for advanced landing fields became urgent as the Allied forces moved east across France and Germany. RAF Lashenden was used by the Royal Air Force, Royal Canadian Air Force and United States Army Air Forces before closing in September 1945.

After the war, the airfield reverted to farmland until the present private grass airfield was opened in the late 1960s.

== History ==
It was originally farmland, called Shenley Farm. Headcorn Aerodrome was first used for general aviation in 1927 when the local landowner flew with a group of friends.

In 1942 it was requisitioned by the Airfields Board. It was named RAF Lashenden in an attempt to confuse the enemy (Lashenden is to the southwest of the field). Flying started in 1943.

The USAAF Ninth Air Force required several temporary Advanced Landing Grounds (ALG) along the channel coast prior to the June 1944 Normandy Landings to provide tactical air support for the ground forces landing in France.

The following units were here at some point:

- No. 17 (Fighter) Wing RAF (August 1943)
- No. 127 Airfield Headquarters RAF (June - August 1943)
- No. 403 Squadron RCAF (1943)
- No. 421 Squadron RCAF (1943)
- 354th Fighter Group
  - 353rd Fighter Squadron
  - 355th Fighter Squadron
  - 356th Fighter Squadron
  - 362nd Fighter Squadron

With the Americans having left, farming resumed in 1945 but this was not the end of the land's association with aircraft. In the late 1960s, the landowners started using part of the former wartime east-west runway site adjacent to the A274, for private flying. A grass airstrip was built aligned 10/28 with a grass parking area for light aircraft. This led to the formation of Weald Air Services Limited, a small charter company, and later a flying school was set up and the airfield became a busy centre for light flying in the area.

== Current use ==
The airfield is host to Headcorn Parachute Club, the only skydiving club in Kent. The club operates a Cessna Caravan and regularly flies to altitudes between 10,000 and 12,000 ft (3,000 and 3,700 m) AGL. The club offers introductory training (tandem, static line/RAPs and AFF).

Aero Legends is also present offering Supermarine Spitfire experiences.

The Tiger Club was also based at the airfield after moving from Redhill Aerodrome in 1990 before moving onto Damyns Hall Aerodrome

A small museum of aviation relics was established on the site, the Lashenden Air Warfare Museum.

Headcorn Aerodrome has a CAA Ordinary Licence (Number P838) that allows flights for the public transport of passengers or for flying instruction as authorised by the licensee. It is still also sometimes known as Lashenden Aerodrome (the non-directional beacon identifier is "LSH"). PPR (Prior Permission Required) is required to land.

== See also ==
- List of former Royal Air Force stations
