= Wienerwald =

Wienerwald may refer to:

- The Vienna Woods, forested highlands in the Northern Limestone Alps
- Wienerwald (restaurant), a chain of fast-food restaurants
- Wienerwald, Austria, a town in Bezirk Mödling, Lower Austria, Austria

== See also ==
- "Tales from the Vienna Woods" (German: Geschichten aus dem Wienerwald), a waltz by Johann Strauss II
