= F. Michael Rogers =

United States Air Force general

Felix Michael Rogers
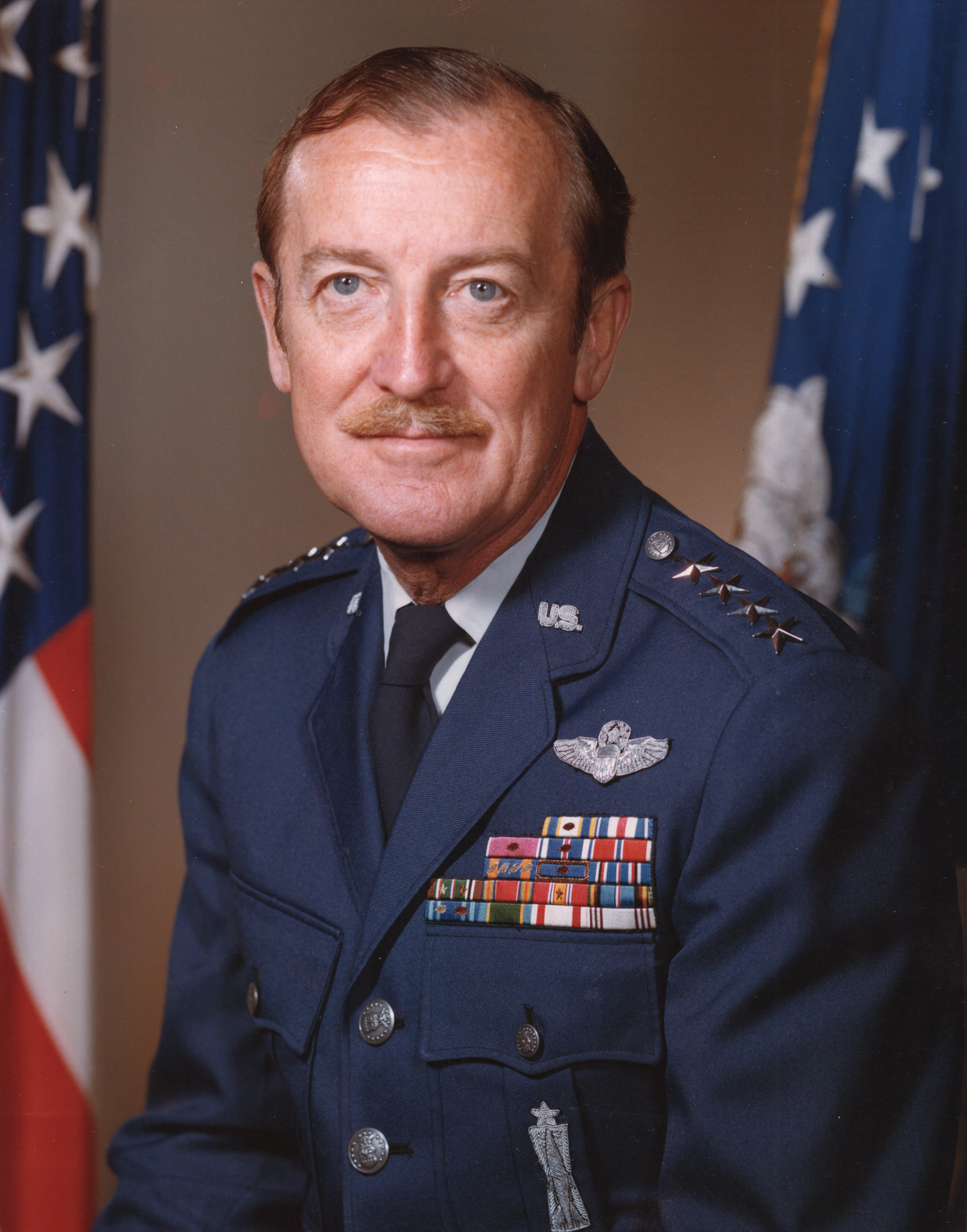
- Born: July 6, 1921; Somerville, Massachusetts, US
- Died: April 23, 2014 (aged 92); Walter Reed National Military Medical Center, Bethesda, Maryland, US
- Burial place: Arlington National Cemetery
- Military career
- Allegiance: United States
- Branch: United States Air Force
- Service years: 1942–1978
- Rank: General
- Commands: 353rd Fighter Squadron; 77th Fighter Squadron; Vice Commander Air Training Command; Air University; Air Force Logistics Command
- Conflicts: World War II; Cold War; Korean War; Vietnam War

Felix Michael Rogers (July 6, 1921 – April 23, 2014), usually known as Michael Rogers, was a general in the United States Air Force and the former commander of the Air Force Logistics Command, with headquarters at Wright-Patterson Air Force Base, Ohio. The command mission is to provide worldwide technical logistics support to all Air Force active and Reserve force activities, Military Assistance Program countries, and designated United States Government agencies. He is a graduate of the National War College.

== Biography ==
=== Early life ===
Rogers was born in Somerville, Massachusetts, in 1921. He graduated from Newton North High School in Newtonville in 1939. He enlisted as a private in April 1942, became an aviation cadet in August 1942, and completed pilot training and received a commission as a second lieutenant at Yuma, Arizona in 1943. During World War II, Rogers served as a P-39 Airacobra pilot with the 353rd Fighter Squadron at Hamilton Field, California He moved with the squadron to the European Theater of Operations, flew P-51 Mustang aircraft and became squadron commander. He is a fighter ace, credited with 12 enemy aircraft while flying from bases in England, Italy and France. He returned to the United States in January 1945 and was assigned to flying duties in fighter aircraft until November 1945 when he became commandant of troops at Hunter Field, Georgia. Between September 1946 and June 1947, he served as flight commander, operations officer, and commander of the 77th Fighter Squadron, 20th Fighter Group, at Shaw Air Force Base, South Carolina. He next was a student at the University of Virginia under the Air Force Institute of Technology program from July 1947 to August 1949. In August 1949 Rogers was transferred to Headquarters United States Air Force as an intelligence staff officer in the Directorate of Intelligence. He attended the language course at Lacaze Academy in Washington D.C., from October 1952 to June 1953, in preparation for attaché duties. He received a bachelor of science degree in military science from the University of Maryland in 1952. Rogers served as assistant air attach in Madrid, Spain from June 1953 to February 1957. He then returned to Headquarters United States Air Force as chief of the Current Intelligence Branch in the Office of the Deputy Chief of Staff, Operations. In 1958 he was transferred to the Organization of the Joint Chiefs of Staff as director of current intelligence, J-2, and in August 1960 entered the National War College. In July 1961 he was assigned to the Office of the Assistant Secretary of Defense with duty station at the State Department.

=== Later career ===
Rogers served as secretary of the Air Force Council in the Office of the Vice Chief of Staff from May 1962 until February 1963, and then as director of the secretariat, Air Force Council Designated Systems Management Group, Air Staff Board. He was assigned to Air Force Systems Command as assistant deputy chief of staff, development plans in September 1966, and became deputy chief of staff, development plans in August 1968. Rogers served as senior member, United Nations Command, Military Armistice Commission, Korea, from July 1970 to August 1971. He assumed the position of deputy chief of staff for technical training at Air Training Command Headquarters in August 1971. He became vice commander of Air Training Command in November 1972. In November 1973 Rogers was appointed commander of the Air University at Maxwell Air Force Base, Alabama. In this position, he directed the professional military education programs for both officers and noncommissioned officers to meet the requirements of the Air Force. He became commander of the Air Force Logistics Command in August 1975. Rogers was promoted to the grade of general effective September 1, 1975. He retired on January 31, 1978. After retirement, he helped to co-found and was CEO of two luxury airlines, Regent Air and MGM Grand Air. In retirement, Rogers resided in Santa Barbara, California until his death from complications of Parkinson's disease in 2014 and is buried at Arlington National Cemetery.

== Awards ==
Awards earned during his career:

USAF Command pilot badge
Air Force Distinguished Service Medal with three bronze oak leaf clusters
Silver Star
Legion of Merit with bronze oak leaf cluster
Distinguished Flying Cross with bronze oak leaf cluster
Bronze Star Medal
Air Medal with four silver oak leaf clusters
Air Force Presidential Unit Citation with bronze oak leaf cluster
American Campaign Medal
European-African-Middle Eastern Campaign Medal with silver and bronze campaign stars
World War II Victory Medal
National Defense Service Medal with bronze service star
Armed Forces Expeditionary Medal
Korea Defense Service Medal
Air Force Longevity Service Award with one silver and two bronze oak leaf clusters
Small Arms Expert Marksmanship Ribbon
Order of Aeronautical Merit (Spain)
Order of National Security Merit, 3rd class (South Korea)
