= Regent Air =

"All-frills" US luxury air carrier (1983–1986)

- 727-100 Los Angeles October 1985
| IATA | ICAO | Call sign |
|---|---|---|
| 4R | — | — |
- Founded: February 2, 1982 incorporated in Delaware
- Commenced operations: October 14, 1983
- Ceased operations: March 3, 1986
- Fleet size: 3
- Destinations: Los Angeles; New York
- Parent company: Regent Tours International
- Headquarters: Los Angeles, California, United States
- Key people: Clifford S. Perlman (owner, 1982–1984); F. Michael Rogers (CEO, 1982–1984)

Regent Air was an "all-frills" airline based in Los Angeles, California that operated luxury service with customized Boeing 727-100s at super-low seating density from New York to Los Angeles in the mid-1980s. The airline suffered from regulatory issues that for much of its life prevented it from operating its own flights. After it failed, its aircraft and some of its management re-appeared the next year in the guise of MGM Grand Air, another New York to Los Angeles luxury airline.

== History ==
Regent was originally incorporated as Firstair Corp. but changed name to Regent Air Corp. to avoid a conflict with Canadian carrier First Air. The airline initially had only 30 seats on a Boeing 727-100, and included private rooms, a dining salon and on board barber and secretarial services. The airline's initial tag-line was "The sky is no longer the limit." The airline offered complimentary limousine as well as connecting helicopter service for their flights, but fares were 50% higher than their competition's prices. The airline initially aimed to offer scheduled service from New York to Los Angeles and San Francisco, with weekend service from the west coast to Hawaii. However, it scrapped all but Los Angeles to New York.

The airline was initially unable to achieve certification in its own right. The Civil Aeronautics Board (CAB) withheld authority based on doubts about the corporation's "compliance disposition." Casino operators Clifford S. Perlman and his brother Stuart held 2/3 of Regent's equity. The CAB noted past Perlman issues with the Securities Exchange Commission, the Nevada Gaming Commission and the New Jersey Casino Control Commission. Some of these related to alleged ties to organized crime. The interim solution was that Regent aircraft were operated by a contract airline, International Air Service Company (IASCO). In 1983 Regent agreed to acquire Ocean Airways, a defunct commuter airline that had been called Monmouth Airlines until 1979 and had come out of bankruptcy with almost no assets, for Regent stock valued at $2.4 million. In 1984, the Perlmans sold their equity, but remained the main debt-holders. Regent was able to get temporary authority effective 14 March 1985 (the government still concerned about possible Perlman influence) but IASCO's contract expired 28 February, so the airline did not operate for two weeks. Full authority came only in June 1985.

Regent was deeply unprofitable. As of January 1986, when the airline was sold again, accumulated losses reached $38 million (over $115 million in 2026 terms). Operations ceased March 3, 1986, by which time the airline had been selling tickets on future Boeing 747 flights to Hawaii. The New York attorney general forced the airline to escrow such advance sales, eliminating the ability to fund the flights from future ticket sales and ending any hope of resuming service. The Federal Aviation Administration revoked Regent's operating certificate in July.

== Legacy ==
All three Regent aircraft, and Regent's 1982–1984 president, F. Michael Rogers, resurfaced in 1987 at MGM Grand Air, also a luxury airline flying from Los Angeles to New York (Kennedy Airport this time), working for another casino operator, Kirk Kerkorian.

== Fleet ==
March 1985:

- 3 Boeing 727-191

== See also ==
- List of defunct airlines of the United States
- International Air Service Company
- MGM Grand Air
