= Clifford S. Perlman =

American entrepreneur

- Born: March 30, 1926; Philadelphia, Pennsylvania, U.S.
- Died: September 4, 2016 (aged 90); Bel Air, California, U.S.
- Occupation: Entrepreneur
- Spouses: Nancy Hutson Perlman; Cynthia Rubin Perlman; Eileen Eleanor Perlman; Evelyn Perlman
- Children: 5

Clifford "Cliff" S. Perlman (March 30, 1926 – September 4, 2016) was an American entrepreneur and president and CEO of the Caesars Palace casino in Las Vegas for over a decade. During his ownership he built thousands of additional rooms to what is the current Caesars Palace. Most notably, Perlman first introduced live sports and boxing to Las Vegas. With his brother Stuart, they founded the international fast food franchise Lum's and bought, sold, and operated an airline.

Perlman, prior to his death, spent his time between his residences in Beverly Hills and Miami.

== Early years ==
Perlman was born March 30, 1926, in Philadelphia, Pennsylvania, where he attended primary and secondary school. In 1943, he joined the U.S. Army, stationed at Camp Blanding, Florida, and subsequently joined the 86th Infantry Division, Perlman was shipped to the European Theater, 1944, and served through the end of the war. Perlman was awarded the Combat Infantryman Badge, three Battle Stars and the Bronze Star.

Returning from the war, Perlman enrolled at the University of Miami in 1947, and the University of Miami School of Law, 1948. He was the founding member of the Bar and Gavel Legal Society and editor of the first law school newspaper, The Barrister. He was admitted to federal and state bars in 1951. He practiced law for nine years under the firm name Perlman, Litman and Sponder.

== Lum's ==
In 1956, Perlman and his brother Stuart founded the first store of fast-food chain Lum's Inc. in Miami Beach, Florida. Lum's was founded for $12,000. With Clifford commanding and Stuart executing, they had within a couple of years established a 389-unit franchise chain that spanned Canada, Puerto Rico, and 29 American states.

Perlman and his brother also owned Dirr's Gold Seal Meats; a business large enough to supply the Lum's chain with 25 percent of its packed meat products while keeping other eateries stocked as well. Their third subsidiary, Dade Wholesale Products, was their only concern outside the food industry. Dade owned an 86-unit string of Eagle Army-Navy Discount Stores, which grew to 111 stores under Perlman stewardship.

The three businesses combined to bring Lum's sales for 1969 totaling $23.2 million, yielding a net income of $2.8 million—too small a bankroll to meet the $60 million purchase price of Caesars Palace. Clifford Perlman then sold both Dade and Dirr's in 1970, raising $8.5 million and $5 million respectively. This was more than enough to supply the $2 million escrow that was part of the deal between their company and Jay Sarno.

The Perlmans sold the company in 1971 to John Brown of Kentucky Fried Chicken. At the time of sale, the company owned and franchised over 400 stores in the U.S., Hawaii, Puerto Rico, and Europe.

== Cliff Perlman and the gaming industry ==
In 1969, under the ownership of Perlman and his brother, Lum's, Inc. purchased Caesars Palace, a 500-room hotel casino on the famous Las Vegas Strip, for $60 million. They renamed the casino Caesar's World. This was the first publicly held company to enter the casino industry in Las Vegas. The transaction was approved by the Nevada Gaming Commission in August 1969. The terms of agreement also stipulated that $30 million would be paid to Sarno during the first year, that the $28 million outstanding would be whittled down by a $9.5 million payment in 1971, and that the rest, at 5.5 percent interest, was to be paid in equal installments over the next three years.

In his 13 years as president and CEO of Caesars Palace, Perlman established his casino as Las Vegas's most prominent and himself as a gaming innovator. He oversaw the business's expansion from a hotel with 550 rooms and pre-tax revenues of $5.8 million to a conglomerate with 1,750 rooms and more than $82 million in pre-tax revenue. While in charge at Caesars Palace, it became known as one of the great entertainment and casino gaming hotels in the world. Caesars Palace was the first Las Vegas casino to implement an organized overseas marketing strategy, opening offices in Mexico City, Mexico, Caracas, Venezuela, and Hong Kong, as well as marketing efforts in Australia and Japan.

During Perlman's tenure the vastly popular entertainer Frank Sinatra played at the casino for over 10 years, the longest continuous engagement of his career. In association with fight promoter Don King, Caesars Palace Las Vegas also hosted major boxing events from 1975 to 1982, including some of history's most famous. Perlman once instructed "If there is no room to host it the event set it up in the parking lot". Over 25,000 people attended boxing events in the parking lot at Caesars in 1979, an unheard-of figure for those times. Caesars Palace Las Vegas Hotel & Casino also acquired a Formula One Racing event, hosted by Paul Newman, that was held in Las Vegas for five years and initiated the Alan King Tennis Classic.

Perlman also developed and built Caesar's Tahoe, a 400-room hotel casino on the south shore of Lake Tahoe; Caesar's Palace Atlantic City, a 500-room hotel/100,000-square-foot casino complex; and Cove Haven and Paradise Stream in the Poconos, a hotel complex specializing in honeymoon suites with heart-shaped pools, bathtubs, and beds. Under Perlman's ownership, Cove Haven's pre-tax profit increased from $1 million in 1972 to $32 million in 1982.

In 1972 Perlman also, through Caesar's World, purchased the Thunderbird resort; he resold it to Major Riddle in 1977.

Perlman was appointed the first chairman of MGM Grand, Inc. on the Las Vegas Strip and oversaw the project's financing and construction. He left the project in 1990 to attend to personal issues.

Perlman and his brother bought First Air and created luxury transcontinental carrier Regent Air Corporation in 1983. They had numerous issues, including difficulties obtaining a license from the Civil Aeronautics Board for the airline to fly. The airline continued to suffer financially, and the Perlmans sold their shares a few years later.

For a few years in the early 2000s, Perlman was acting chairman for Multi Capital, an investment banking firm in NYC.

Perlman also served as a trustee at Mt. Sinai Hospital in Miami Beach, and at the University of North Las Vegas.

In 2007 Perlman was inducted into the Gaming Hall of Fame. He died on September 4, 2016, at the age of 90.
