= Spirit of America Airlines =

US contract passenger and freight airline (1978–1989)

Spirit of America Airlines International Air Service Company (IASCO)
- L-188F Tucson 1988 w/underlying CAM Air livery (CAM Air photo in External links)
IATA	ICAO	Call sign
IM	IAS	STARFLEET
- Founded: October 1959 incorporated in California
- Commenced operations: May 1978 as IASCO; May 1985 as Spirit of America
- Ceased operations: 1989
- Fleet size: See Fleet
- Parent company: International Air Service Company (IASCO)
- Headquarters: Burlingame, California, United States
- Key people: James C. Jack, Jr.

Spirit of America Airlines (Spirit) was originally the airline operation of International Air Service Company (IASCO), a pilot-supply and training company, which started flying for package express companies like Emery Air Freight in 1978. It also flew for pre-certification passenger airlines such as Regent Air. IASCO created Spirit as a separate airline subsidiary in 1985, still targeting contract flying, and bought freight airline CAM Air International the same year. CAM was the former Fleming International Airways, which had flown freight since 1973. Both CAM and Spirit also flew on behalf of the US Air Force Logair freight network. The late 1980s saw a substantial disruption in contract flying demand as United Parcel Service brought most flying in-house and Emery, Purolator and CF AirFreight consolidated. By early 1989, Spirit was flying just one aircraft for Casino Express Airlines. It ceased operations the same year.

== History ==
=== International Air Service Company ===
In October 1959, former Transocean Air Lines pilots created IASCO to provide contract pilots to Japan Air Lines (JAL). Over time, IASCO expanded its business to include pilot training, aircraft leasing, maintenance, sales and some non-aviation activities but by the late 1970s JAL was still by far its dominant customer. For three years ending 1979, IASCO tried to take control of Aloha Airlines. By then almost all IASCO stock was owned by James C. Jack, Jr., CEO since 1963.

In May 1978, IASCO started air taxi operations, flying Cessna 404 Titans and a Dassault Falcon 20 for Purolator and Emery. In February 1980, the Civil Aeronautics Board (CAB) gave IASCO temporary all-cargo certification in order to fly Aloha Boeing 737s for Purolator, made permanent on April 16. The CAB gave IASCO scheduled passenger authority in January 1983. By 1984, IASCO had a dozen 727 freighters operating for Emery and Purolator. From October 1983 through February 1985 IASCO flew three Boeing 727s for luxury airline Regent Air between New York and Los Angeles as a result of Regent's difficulty obtaining a certificate of its own. In 1984–1985, it also flew two Lockheed L-1011 aircraft on behalf of Five Star Airlines in advance of Five Star getting its own certificate (photo in External links).

727-191 operated by IASCO for Regent Air 1984 Newark

727-100F operated by Spirit of America for CF AirFreight 1988 Newark

737-200 operated by Spirit of America for Casino Express 1988 Phoenix

=== Spirit of America Airlines ===
IASCO announced Spirit of America Airlines April 1985, launching May 6 with two Douglas DC-8 freighters flown on transcontinental service. See External links for a photo. IASCO believed exit of American and United Airlines from all-freighter service left an opening for Spirit to serve air freight forwarders and expected to upgrade to Boeing 747s. Also in 1985, Spirit bought CAM Air International (history provided below). However, in 1987, Spirit's business looked much like that of IASCO earlier in the decade, namely flying 727s for package express/freight airlines, with the addition of flying for Logair. And similar to how IASCO had flown for Regent and Five Star, in 1987 Spirit started flying a Boeing 737 for Casino Express Airlines to Elko, Nevada.

The late 1980s saw substantial changes in contract flying demand. In 1987, United Parcel Service (UPS) announced it was transitioning most flying in-house. By the late 1980s, Purolator, Emery and CF Airfreight consolidated with CF after heavy losses.. This resulted in turbulence among contract freight companies. For instance, UPS-contractor Interstate declared bankruptcy upon UPS's announcement, and it contributed to another contractor, Ryan, becoming moribund for a time. In particular, while Orion Air lost its UPS aircraft, it gained 10 727s that Spirit was flying for Emery. (Note: 10 727s in Spirit's fleet flying for Emery in 1987 were in Orion's fleet in 1989 also flying for Emery: N329QS, N355QS, N356QS, N357QS, N358QS, N359QS, N427EX, N429EX, N430EX, N431EX) By April 1989, Spirit was flying only the Boeing 737 Casino Express with the rest of its remaining fleet (six Electras and four 727s) stored and available for sale. Later that year, Casino Express got its own certificate and took over the flying. By year-end, Spirit was no longer operating.

CAM Air International Fleming International Airways
IATA	ICAO	Call sign
OX -	FLM; FLM	BOX HAULER; FLEMING
- Founded: March 9, 1973 incorporated in Massachusetts
- Commenced operations: 1973 as Fleming International Airways; 30 August 1983 as CAM Air International
- Ceased operations: 1986
- Parent company: Micale Management Group (from 1974)
- Headquarters: Fort Lauderdale, Florida; Miami, Florida; United States
- Key people: Charles A. Micale
- Founder: Robert P. Fleming

=== Fleming International Airways/CAM Air International ===
Robert Fleming founded Fleming International Airways (FIA) in March 1973 in Massachusetts. Initially, FIA's main business was flying auto parts with Douglas DC-7s, one of many small so-called commercial operators (also known as uncertificated carriers) flying auto parts for Air Transport Services Corp., one of two organizations (the other was Zantop International Airlines) arranging air transport of auto parts for the Big Three automakers in the mid-1970s. In 1974 Charles A. Micale, a fast-food restaurant entrepreneur, acquired control of FIA. Micale Management Group provided management and financing to the airline. In 1977, FIA was said to carry "electronic equipment, textiles, automotive parts and medical and laboratory supplies." In December 1979, following 1977 air cargo deregulation, the airline gained an air cargo certificate. At the time the airline had five Lockheed L-188 Electras.

Thereafter the airline grew quickly, with a fleet of 12 by 1983 and 18 by 1985. Its fleet of nine Lockheed Electras in 1984 gave it the largest Electra fleet in the US after Zantop and third in the world. On 30 August 1983, the airline changed its name to CAM Air International, after its owner, Charles A. Micale. Robert Fleming had continued as president as late as 1982, but the name change filing shows Micale as president. As of 2026, the Charles A. Micale Foundation, dba CAM Family Foundation, uses the same CAM monogram that CAM Air had in its livery (see External links for a picture of that livery). The airline's business included flying for the Air Force's Logair domestic air freight system.

The airlines' headquarters was at different times given as Pompano Beach, Florida, Miami and Fort Launderdale.

== Fleet ==
=== Fleming International Airways ===
World Airline Fleets 1979 (copyright 1979) shows Fleming with:

- 5 Lockheed L-188F Electra

March 1983:

- 3 Boeing 727-100C
- 1 Douglas DC-8-33F
- 8 Lockheed L-188F Electra

=== CAM Air ===
March 1985:

- 9 Boeing 727-100C
- 9 Lockheed L-188F Electra

=== IASCO ===
March 1982: (client in parentheses)

- 8 Boeing 727-100C (Emery)
- 2 Dassault Falcon 20D/E

March 1984: (client in parentheses)

- 12 Boeing 727-100C (2 Purolator, 10 Emery)
- 3 Boeing 727-191 (Regent Air)

=== Spirit of America Airlines ===
1987-88 World Airline Fleets (copyright 1987) shows Spirit of America with:

- 11 Boeing 727-100C/F (10 at Emery)
- 1 Douglas DC-8-73F
- 8 Lockheed L-188F Electra

April 1989:

- 1 Boeing 737-200

== Accidents ==
- 6 July 1977: Fleming International Airways L-188F N280F crashed on takeoff from St Louis Lambert Airport killing all three crew. The crew was cited for improperly trying to operate an aircraft with known problems.

== See also ==
- List of defunct airlines of the United States
- Transocean Air Lines
- Aloha Airlines
- Regent Air
- Emery Air Freight
- CF AirFreight
- Purolator
- Casino Express Airlines
