= 353rd Combat Training Squadron =

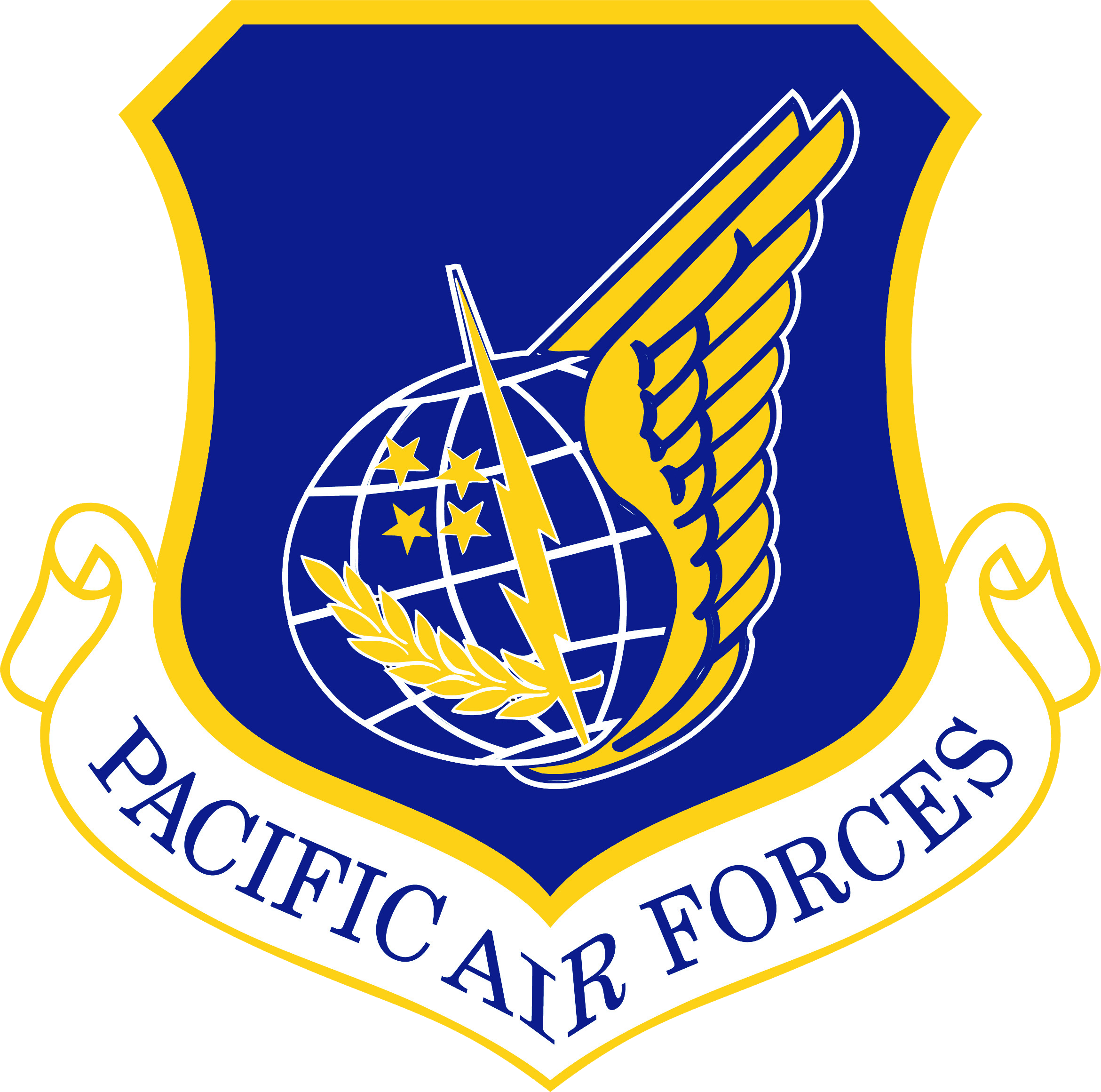
353rd Combat Training Squadron

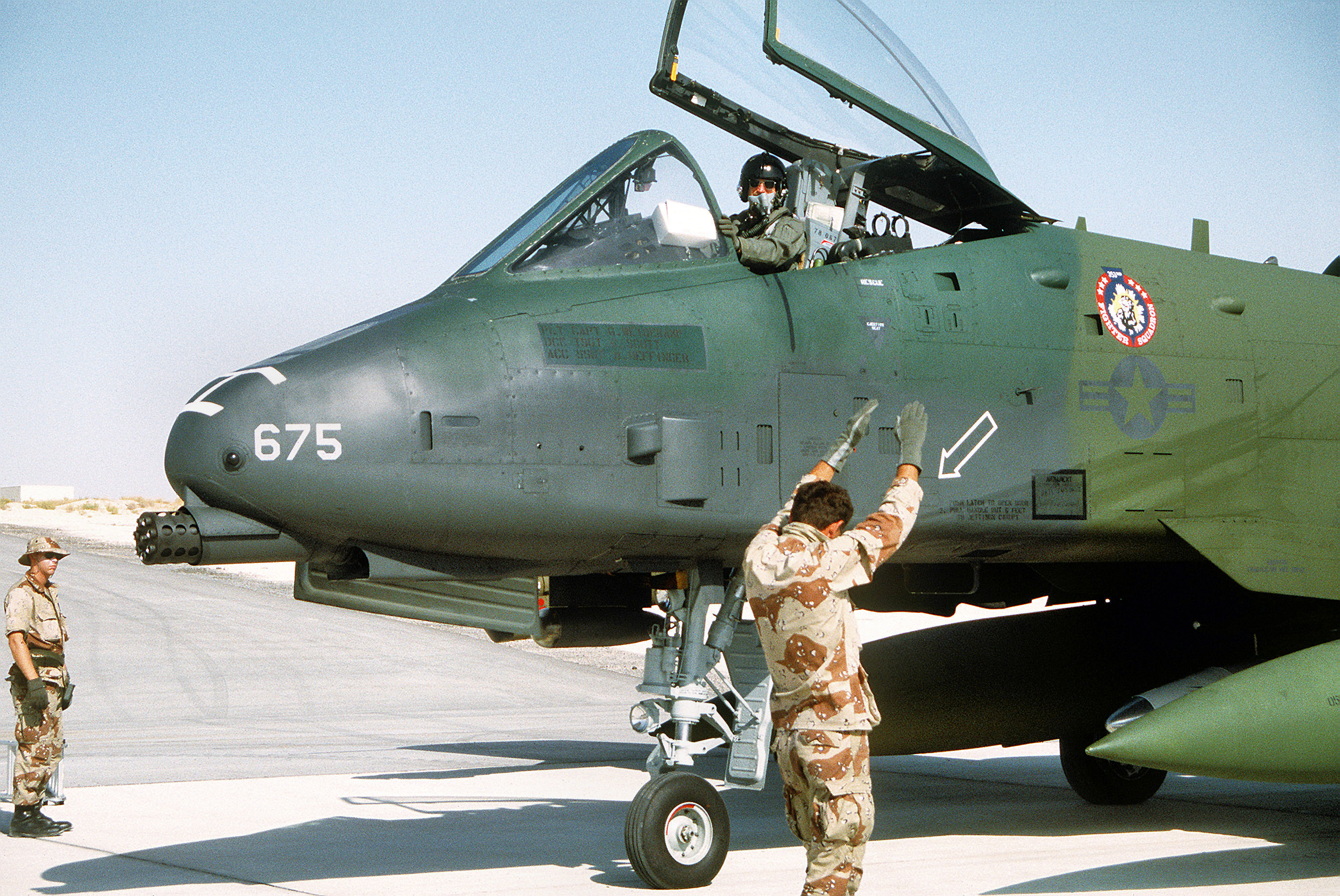
- A ground crewman signals a squadron A-10 Thunderbolt II to a stop at King Fahd International Airport for Operation Desert Shield
- Active: 1942–1946; 1956–1992; 1993–present
- Country: United States
- Branch: United States Air Force
- Role: Training
- Part of: Pacific Air Forces
- Garrison/HQ: Eielson Air Force Base
- Engagements: World War II; 1958 Lebanon crisis Dominican Civil War; Vietnam War; Gulf War

Commanders
- Notable commanders: F. Michael Rogers

Insignia
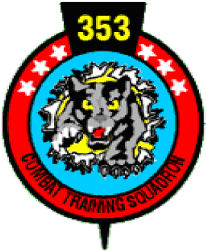
- 353rd Combat Training Squadron emblem (Note: Approved 27 August 1957. Description: Over a red disc a black wedge pointing downward surmounted by a sky blue disc edged black; springing through the blue disc from a yellow field behind it, a ferocious black panther, pupils of eyes black, tongue red, eyeballs yellow, claws, teeth, and highlights white; jagged broken parts of disc turned back, lined white; on upper edge of red disc six white stars, three on either side of the wedge.)

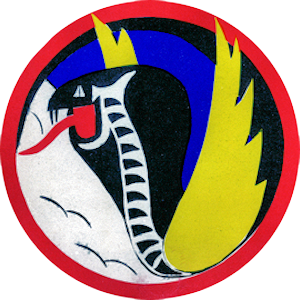
- 353rd Fighter Squadron emblem (World War II)

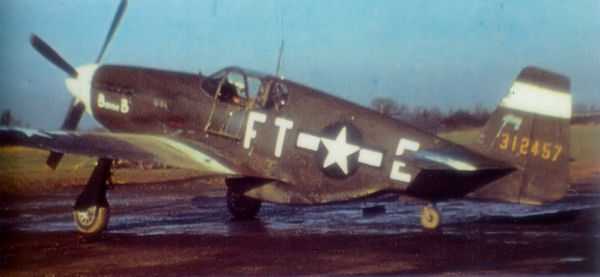
Squadron P-51 Mustang, probably at RAF Boxted, early 1944 (Note: Aircraft is North American P-51B-1-NA Mustang, serial 43-12457.)

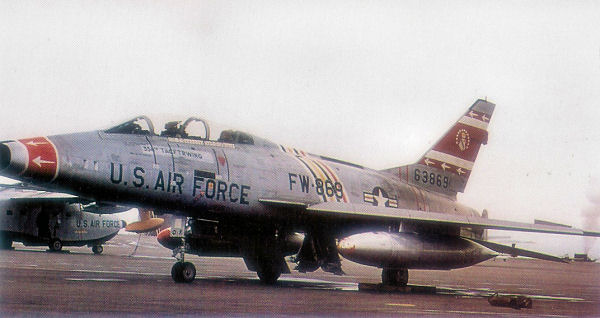
Squadron F-100F Super Sabre, marked as Col. Gabreski's Wing Commander's aircraft (Note: Aircraft is North American F-100F-10-NA Super Sabre, serial 56-3869.)

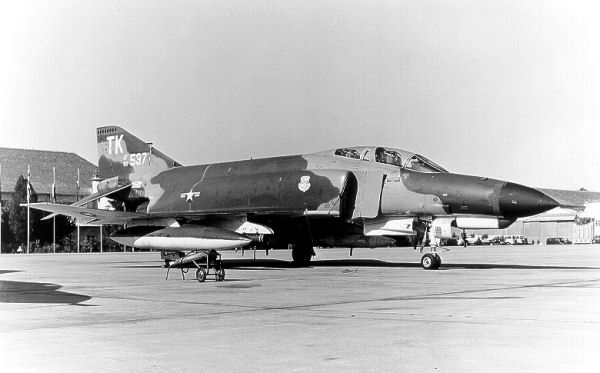
Squadron F-4E Phantom II at Torrejon Air Base Spain, June 1970 (Note: Aircraft is McDonnell F-4E-41-MC Phantom, serial 68-0537.)

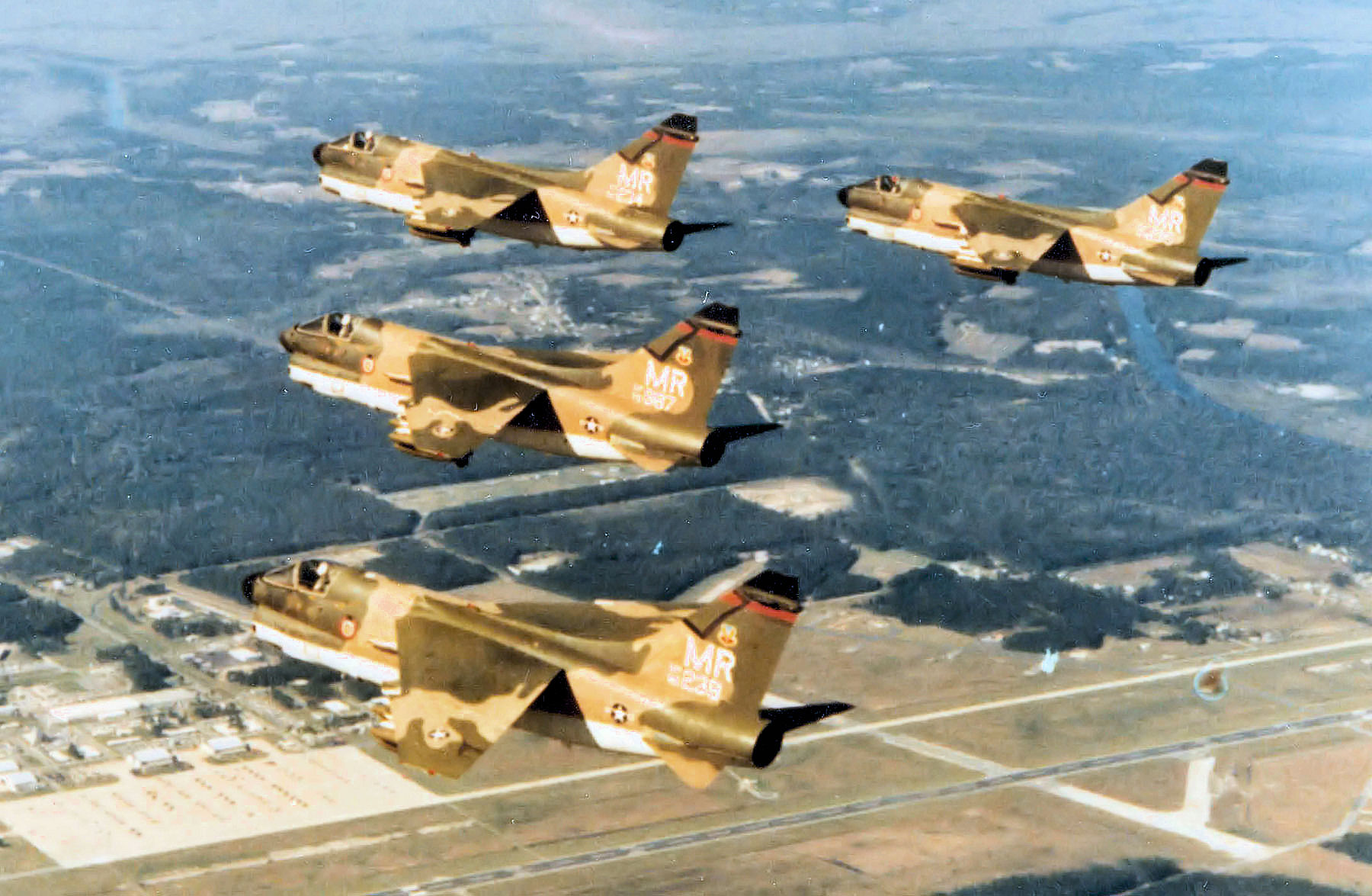
Formation of squadron A-7Ds over Myrtle Beach Air Force Base, September 1971 (Note: Aircraft are Ling-Temco-Vought A-7D-CV Corsair IIs, serials 71–0234, 70–0987, 71–0239 and 71–0235.)

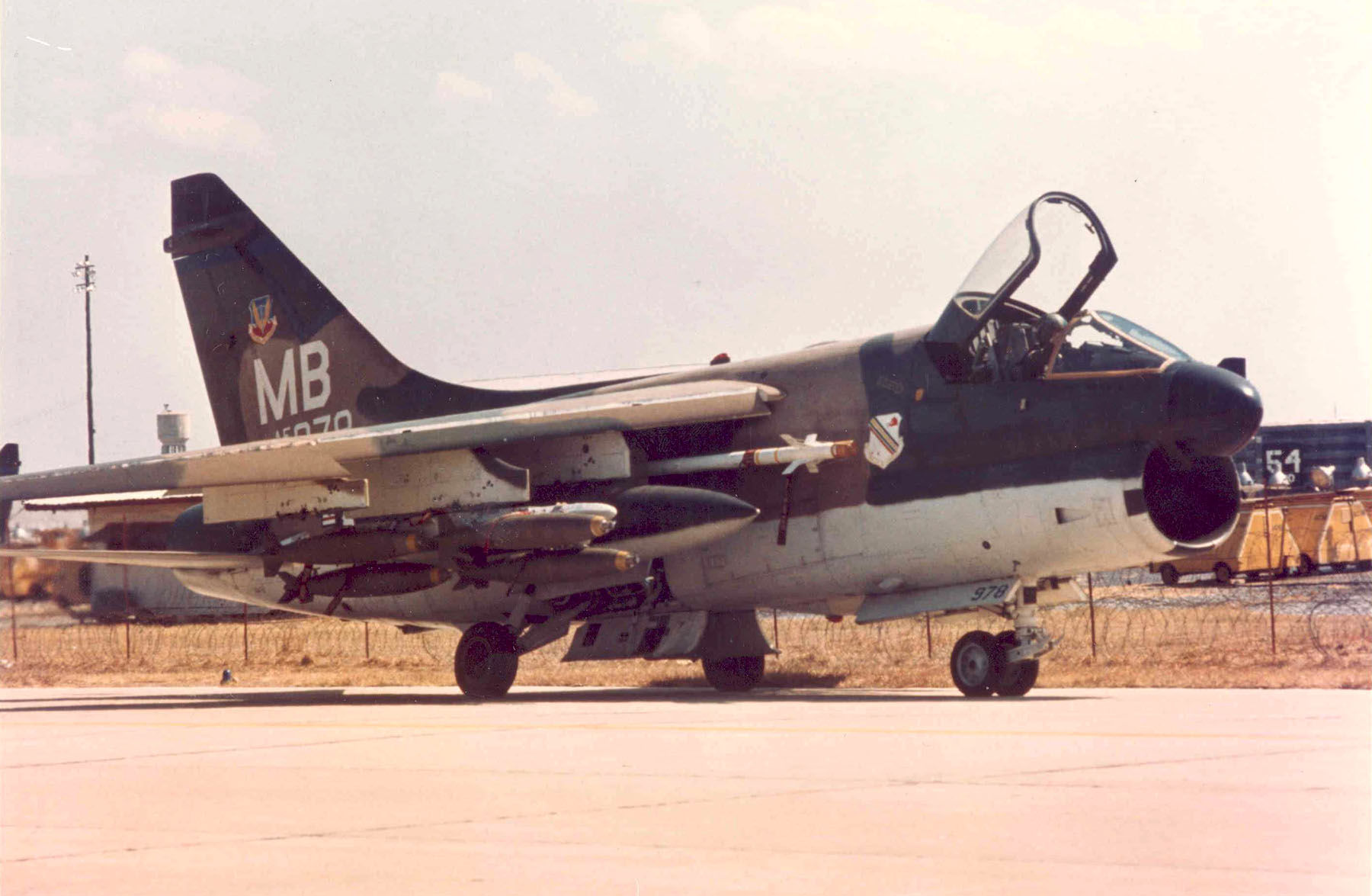
Squadron A-7D Corsair II, deployed to Korat Royal Thai Air Force Base, Thailand (Note: Aircraft is Ling-Temco-Vought A-7D-8-CV Corsair II, serial 70-0978. The photo was probably taken in late 1972 prior to takeoff on a combat mission over Indochina.)

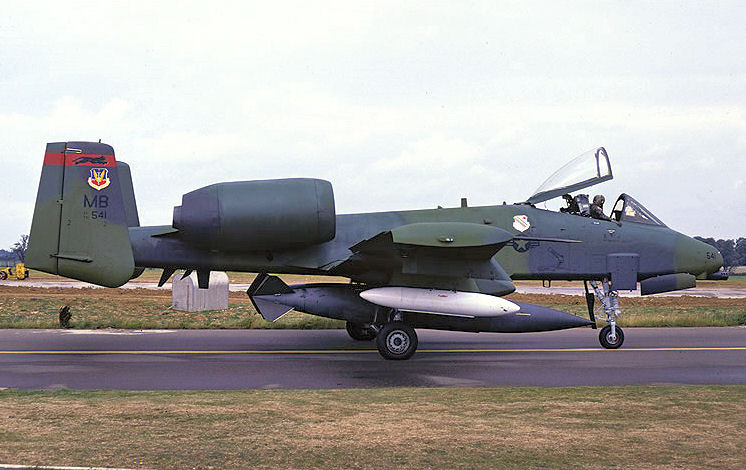
Squadron A-10A Thunderbolt II during an operational deployment to USAFE, 1981 (Note: Aircraft is Fairchild Republic A-10A Thunderbolt II, serial 76-0541.)

The 353rd Combat Training Squadron is a United States Air Force training squadron responsible for Exercise RED FLAG – ALASKA held annually in Alaska.

== Overview ==
All the activities on Alaska's three weapons training ranges – incorporating more than 68,000 square miles (180,000 km^{2}) of airspace, 28 threat systems, and 225 targets for range and exercise operations – are planned and controlled by 353rd CTS personnel.

The three tactical ranges supervised by the squadron's range division are Blair Lakes, Yukon and Oklahoma. The Blair Lakes Conventional Range is located about 26 miles southwest of Eielson AFB. Isolated in a sub-Arctic tundra environment, this range is staffed continuously and is normally accessible only by helicopter.

The Yukon Tactical and Electronic Warfare Range is 15 miles (24 km) east of Eielson. Accessible most of the year, this mountainous complex is only staffed as necessary to provide electronic warfare training.

The Oklahoma Tactical Range is located within the U.S. Army's Cold Region Test Center at Fort Greely, Alaska, and is the largest of the three ranges, encompassing more than 900,000 acres (3,600 km^{2}) of relatively flat, open terrain.

Cope Thunder exercises take place over Alaskan and Canadian airspace. The airspace – 17 permanent military operations areas and high-altitude training areas, plus two restricted areas – total more than 68,000 square miles (180,000 km^{2}).

Cope Thunder's economic impact on the communities surrounding Eielson and Elmendorf AFBs have been large and should continue to be so. In 2001 alone, military members taking part in the exercises poured more than $2 million into the local economies. Eielson AFB building projects resulting all or in part from Cope Thunder include a $23 million transient personnel facility, a $13 million Cope Thunder operations building, a $35 million air-to-air tracking system; eight two-bay all-weather aircraft shelters valued at $25 million, and a $2 million range microwave link. Additionally, the number of threat emitters on Cope Thunder ranges was doubled from 14 to 28 and several of the communication systems between ranges and Eielson have been upgraded.

== History ==
=== World War II ===
Activated on 15 November 1942 at Hamilton Field, California, initially equipped with Bell P-39 Airacobras and assigned to IV Fighter Command for training. Moved to several bases in California and Nevada then to Portland Army Air Base, Oregon in June 1943 and re-equipped with new North American P-51B Mustangs. Transitioned to the Mustang throughout the summer of 1943 the deployed to the European Theater of Operations, being assigned to IX Fighter Command in England.

In late 1943, the strategic bombardment campaign over Occupied Europe and Nazi Germany being conducted by VIII Bomber Command was taking heavy losses in aircraft and flight crews as the VIII Fighter Command's Lockheed P-38 Lightnings and Republic P-47 Thunderbolts lacked the range to escort the heavy Boeing B-17 Flying Fortress and Consolidated B-24 Liberator bombers deep into Germany to attack industrial and military targets. The P-51 had the range to perform the escort duties and the unit's operational control was transferred to Eighth Air Force to perform escort missions. From its base at RAF Boxted, the unit flew long-range strategic escort missions with VIII Bomber Command groups, escorting the heavy bombers to targets such as Frankfurt, Leipzig, Augsburg, and Schweinfurt, engaging Luftwaffe day interceptors frequently, with the P-51s outperforming the German Messerschmitt Bf 109 and Focke-Wulf Fw 190 interceptors, causing heavy losses to the Luftwaffe. Remained under operational control of Eighth Air Force until April 1944, when sufficient numbers of P-51D Mustangs and arrived from the United States and were assigned to VIII Fighter Command units for escort duty.

Was relieved from escort duty and was re-equipped with Republic P-47D Thunderbolts, and moved to RAF Lashenden on the southern coast of England. Mission was redefined to provide tactical air support for the forthcoming invasion of France, to support the Third, and later Ninth United States Armies. Flew fighter sweeps over Normandy and along the English Channel coast of France and the Low Countries, April–June 1944, then engaged in heavy tactical bombing of enemy military targets as well as roads, railroads and bridges in the Normandy area to support ground forces in the immediate aftermath of D-Day.

Moved to Advanced Landing Grounds in France beginning at the end of June 1944, moving eastwards to combat airfields and liberated French airports supporting Allied Ground forces as the advanced across Northern France. Later, in 1944, the squadron became involved in dive-bombing and strafing missions, striking railroad yards, bridges, troop concentrations, and airfields. Participated in attacks on German forces in Belgium in the aftermath of the Battle of the Bulge, then moved eastward as part of the Western Allied invasion of Germany. The squadron flew its last mission of the war on 7 May 1945 from the captured Ansbach Airfield.

Remained in Occupied Germany as part of the United States Air Forces in Europe XII Tactical Air Command occupying force after the German Capitulation, being stationed at AAF Station Herzogenaurach. Was inactivated on 31 March 1946.

=== Cold War ===
Reactivated by Tactical Air Command, United States Air Force on 19 November 1956, being assigned to the reactivated 354th Fighter-Day Group at the new Myrtle Beach Air Force Base, South Carolina. Equipped with North American F-100 Super Sabre fighters, the squadron participated in exercises, operations, tests, and firepower demonstrations conducted by the Tactical Air Command within the US and abroad. The unit frequently deployed to Aviano Air Base, Italy and Wheelus Air Base, Libya. Was deployed to Europe during the 1958 Lebanon crisis and was moved to McCoy Air Force Base, Florida in 1962 during the Cuban Missile Crisis. During the Dominican Civil War, the squadron deployed eighteen of its F-100s to Ramey Air Force Base, Puerto Rico to guard against Cuban intervention in the war.

=== United States Air Forces in Europe ===
In 1966 the 353rd Tactical Fighter Squadron was reassigned to the 401st Tactical Fighter Wing, Torrejon AB, Spain when Strategic Air Command ended B-47 Stratojet deployments to the base and it was reassigned to the United States Air Forces in Europe.

The host 401st TFW was itself reassigned to Torrejon from England AFB, Louisiana, with its operational fighter squadrons being deployed to Pacific Air Forces in South Vietnam for combat missions during the Vietnam War. The 353rd, along with the 307th TFS from Homestead and 613th from England to provide the 401st a full complement of aircraft.

At Torrejon, the squadron continued to fly the F-100D "Super Sabre." Major operations consisted of maintaining combat readiness; rotating units to other bases in Europe or the Middle East and participating in various United States Air Force, North Atlantic TreatyOrganization and Spanish Air Defense exercises. In 1970 the squadron had its aging F-100 fleet replaced, being re-equipped with F-4D Phantom II aircraft, its personnel being drawn from existing USAFE squadrons or new assignments from the United States. The 353rd's F-4's were tail-coded TK, and from Torrejon, the squadron made periodic partial deployments to Wheelus AB, Libya and Incirlik AB, Turkey, for weapons training. Beginning in June 1970, the 401st TFW was re-equipped with F-4E's.

=== Vietnam War ===
In 1971, the 612th and 613th Tactical Fighter Squadrons were reassigned back to the 401st TFW from their deployment in South Vietnam as part of the drawdown of USAF forces in Southeast Asia. As a result, on 15 July, the 353 TFS was inactivated and reassigned without equipment or personnel to the 354 TFW at Myrtle Beach AFB.

At Myrtle Beach, the squadron assumed the personnel and A-7D Corsair IIs of the inactivating 511th Tactical Fighter Squadron, and begin training flights from Myrtle Beach with the new equipment. On 12 October 1972, the 353rd (commanded by Lt. Col Brown G. Howard III) deployed to Korat Royal Thai Air Force Base, Thailand as part of the 354th Tactical Fighter Wing (Forward), and engaged in combat operations in the Vietnam War. The squadron used A-7 aircraft for close air support and in search and rescue operations. In January 1973, with the Vietnam War ceasefire in place, the squadron reassigned its deployed aircraft to the newly activated 3rd Tactical Fighter Squadron, 388th Tactical Fighter Wing at Korat, and its personnel returned to Myrtle Beach AFB without equipment.

The squadron received new A-7D Corsair IIs upon its return to Myrtle Beach AFB, and the unit resumed training. It again deployed to Korat 31 March 1973, where it flew bombing missions until the bombing halt on 15 August 1973. The 353rd claims the distinction of dropping the last bomb and making the last strafing run of the war.

=== Post Vietnam era ===
On 18 October 1973 the squadron returned to Myrtle Beach AFB and resumed normal training activities. In 1978 the squadron obtained A-10 aircraft and flew training missions with the A-10s for over a decade, being deployed frequently to NATO bases in Germany for annual training exercises.

The unit deployed to King Fahd International Airport, Saudi Arabia 15 August 1990. During Desert Storm, the squadron engaged in combat operations, January–February 1991, inflicting heavy damage to enemy armor and artillery emplacements, cut off enemy supply lines, and engaged in search and rescue operations.

Returned to the United States in March 1991, and returned to peacetime training operations. Immediately began phasing down with the designated BRAC 1990 closure of Myrtle Beach AFB and the pending inactivation of its host Wing. The squadron's aircraft were dispersed, being reassigned to Air National Guard and other active Air Force Fighter Squadrons throughout the balance of 1991 and early 1992. The squadron was inactivated on 15 December 1992.

=== The 1990s ===
In August 1993, the unit activated at Eielson AFB, Alaska. It appears to have taken over the personnel and equipment of the 3rd Fighter Training Squadron. It became responsible for coordination of COPE THUNDER and later, Red Flag-Alaska exercises and controlled the local training ranges.

== Lineage ==
- Constituted as the 353rd Fighter Squadron 12 November 1942

Activated 15 November 1942.
Inactivated 31 March 1946

- Redesignated 353rd Fighter-Day Squadron 28 September 1956

Activated 19 November 1956
Redesignated 353rd Tactical Fighter Squadron 1 July 1958
Redesignated 353rd Fighter Squadron 1 November 1991
Inactivated 15 December 1992

- Activated 20 August 1993

Redesignated 353rd Combat Training Squadron 1 August 1994

=== Assignments ===
- 354th Fighter Group, 12 November 1942 – 31 March 1946
- 354th Fighter-Day Group, 19 November 1956
- 354th Fighter-Day Wing (later 354th Tactical Fighter Wing), 25 September 1957
- 401st Tactical Fighter Wing, 27 April 1966
- 354th Tactical Fighter Wing (later 354th Fighter Wing), 15 July 1971 – 15 December 1992
- 354th Operations Group, 20 August 1993
- 611th Air Operations Group, 4 September 2003
- 354th Operations Group, 1 October 2006 – present

=== Stations ===
- Hamilton Field, California, 15 November 1942
- Tonopah Army Air Field, Nevada, 19 January 1943
- Santa Rosa Army Air Field, California, 2 March 1943
- Portland Army Air Base, Oregon, 4 May – 6 October 1943
- RAF Greenham Common, England, 4 November 1943
- RAF Boxted, England, 13 November 1943
- RAF Lashenden, England, c. 14 April 1944
- Cricqueville-en-Bessin, France (ALG A-2), c. 18 June 1944
- Gaël, France (ALG A-31), 14 August 1944
- Orconte, France (ALG A-66), 21 September 1944

Operated from Saint-Dizier/Robinson, France (ALG A-64), c. 18 November – 1 December 1944

- Rosieres en Haye, France (ALG A-98), 1 December 1944
- Mainz-Finthen Airdrome (ALG Y-64), Ober-Olm, Germany, c. 4 April 1945
- Ansbach Airfield, Germany (ALG R-82), 1 May 1945
- Herzogenaurach Airdrome, Germany (ALG R-29), c. 15 May 1945 – 15 February 1946
- Bolling Field, Washington, D.C., 15 February – 31 March 1946
- Myrtle Beach Air Force Base, South Carolina, 19 November 1956 – 22 April 1966

Rotational 90-day deployments to Aviano Air Base, Italy and Incirlik Air Base, Turkey 1958–1966
Deployed to: Hahn Air Base, West Germany, 15 July – 16 November 1961 (Berlin Crisis)
Deployed to: McCoy Air Force Base, Florida, 8 October 1962 – 20 January 1963 (Cuban Missile Crisis)
Deployed to: Dhahran Airfield, Saudi Arabia, 15 September – 16 December 1963
Deployed to: San Isidro Air Base, Dominican Republic, 2–28 May 1965 (Dominican Crisis)

- Torrejon Air Base, Spain, 27 April 1966

Numerous 30-day deployments to Wheelus Air Base, Libya, 1966–1970

- Myrtle Beach Air Force Base, South Carolina, 15 July 1971 – 15 December 1992

Operated from Korat Royal Thai Air Force Base, Thailand, 10 October 1972 – 21 January 1973 and 31 March – 18 October 1973
Operated from King Fahd International Airport, Saudi Arabia, 15 August 1990 – 2 August 1991

- Eielson Air Force Base, Alaska, 20 August 1993 – present

=== Aircraft ===
- Bell P-39 Airacobra, 1943
- North American P-51 Mustang, 1943–44, 1945–46
- Republic P-47 Thunderbolt, 1944–45
- F-100 Super Sabre, 1956–70
- F-4 Phantom II, 1970–71
- A-7 Corsair II, 1971–78
- A-10 Thunderbolt II, 1978–92

=== Campaign streamers ===
- World War II: Air Offensive, Europe; Normandy; Northern France; Rhineland; Ardennes-Alsace; Central Europe; Air Combat.
- Vietnam War: Vietnam Ceasefire
- Southwest Asia: Defense of Saudi Arabia; Liberation and Defense of Kuwait

=== Decorations ===
- Distinguished Unit Citation: European Theater of Operations, December 1943 – 15 May 1944; France, 25 August 1944.
- Presidential Unit Citation: Southeast Asia, 12 October 1972 – 21 January 1973.
- French Croix de Guerre with Palm: 1 December 1943 – 31 December 1944
- Republic of Vietnam Gallantry Cross with Palm: 12 October 1972 – 28 January 1973
- Air Force Outstanding Unit Awards: 1 October 1962 – 1 December 1963; 15 July 1971 – 31 May 1972; 1 May 1974 – 30 April 1976; 1 July 1978 – 31 May 1979; 1 June 1979 – 22 May 1981; 1 July 1985 – 30 June 1987; 1 May 1990 – 15 March 1992; 20 August 1993 – 31 August 1993; 11 September 2000 – 10 September 2002.
