= Ollie Gleichenhaus =

American restaurateur (1911–1991)

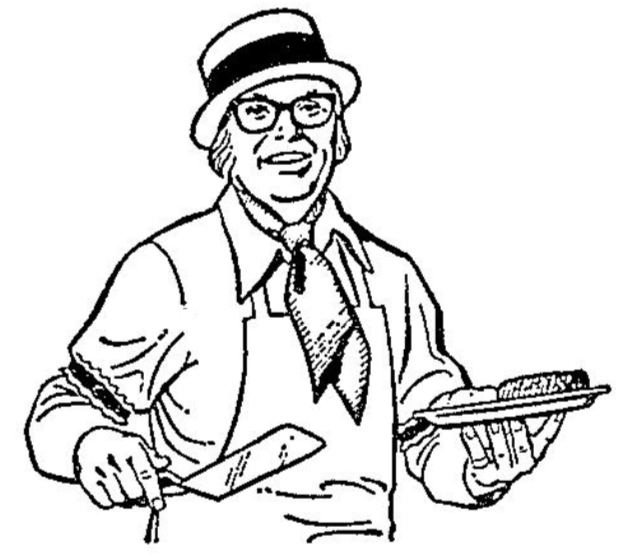
- US Trademark image used in marketing "Ollie's Trolley" restaurants and the "Ollieburger"
- Born: Oliver George Gleichenhaus; September 30, 1911; New York City, U.S.
- Died: January 10, 1991 (aged 79); Miami, Dade County, Florida, U.S.
- Occupations: Restaurateur; businessman

Oliver George Gleichenhaus (September 30, 1911 – January 10, 1991) was an American restaurateur who was known as the "re-inventor" of the hamburger. He owned the small Florida restaurant Ollie's Sandwich Shop, where he created his signature Ollie Burger, which he prepared with his secret blend of 23 herbs and spices, in the mid-1930s. Extremely profane and irascible, Gleichenhaus was known to curse at and eject diners who requested condiments like ketchup to add to his "perfect burgers".

Food franchise mogul John Y. Brown Jr., seeking to add a signature hamburger to his then struggling Lum's Restaurant group, purchased the rights to Gleichenhaus's Ollie Burger, his recipes and likeness for a reported one million dollars. Brown also created the "Ollie's Trolley" franchise consisting of small, take-out only restaurants that prominently featured Gleichenhaus's signature hamburger. Gleichenhaus was required to act as the company's brand ambassador and figurehead. His name and image were used as symbols of the company. The franchise was dissolved in the 1980s. Gleichenhaus's secret formula "Ollieburger" and "Ollie Fries" spice mixes are still available. Gleichenhaus died in 1991 in Miami, Florida, after open heart surgery.

== Early life ==
Oliver George "Ollie" Gleichenhaus was born September 30, 1911, in Brooklyn, New York, the fifth of Adeline (née Abrams) and Leopold Gleichenhaus's five children. His father was a cloak and dress cutter, working with his brother Isaac at L. & I. Gleichenhaus in New York City. Gleichenhaus said his mother took him to Florida as a child "for health reasons".

== "Ollie's Sandwich Shop" ==
Gleichenhaus ran "Ollie's Sandwich Shop", a small Miami Beach, Florida, diner located at 315 23rd Street, at Liberty Avenue and 23rd Street. The diner had just seven stools and three booths and was not air-conditioned, but customers stood in line all day long, waiting to dine. Gleichenhaus said of the restaurant, "It was a crummy dive, but it had charisma".

=== A temperamental restaurateur ===
Gleichenhaus would not allow his customers to request any changes to the food he prepared, saying "When you eat in my joint, you eat what I want you to eat, or out you go!" and "My customers ate what I told them to". He resented customers who left food on their plate, and a customer who requested "good" food would so irritate him, he would turn off the lights and order everyone out of the diner. In 1977 Gleichenhaus said "Anybody who orders an Ollieburger well done should go to a crematorium" and "If you put ketchup on it [an Ollieburger], I'll charge you double."

== The Ollie Burger ==
Gleichenhaus's Ollie Burger was a ⅓-pound hamburger patty made from ground ends of beef tenderloin. "It has to be thick for flavor". The burger was always cooked and served medium-rare, heavily spiced and sauced and served with a slice of melted mozzarella cheese. Discussing the cheese he selected for his Ollie Burger, Gleichenhaus said, "it took me five years to get the right kind. American wasn't right. Gruyere was too chewey. Then I found mozzarella, melts quick".

=== Origin of his secret spice blend recipe ===
In 1974, Gleichenhaus discussed the origin of his Ollie Burger. "I started with little hamburgers on a plain grill, just like everyone else. My burgers had the lettuce, the tomato – the whole schmear! ... I knew I had to find somethin' different, you know, somethin' with a little kick if I was going to get ahead. So I started experimenting. I'd try this and try that".

By the mid-1960s, he had perfected a secret blend of 23 herbs and spices. "I was like a witch conjuring up a brew. I tried everything over the years. Everything! So many different herbs, spices and sauces, you wouldn't believe ... Took me thirty years to get the formula of ingredients right". "It's a question of how to marry them [the spices]. They all have to have their own identity. You don't grind them. They have a cover Nature put on them. The aroma stays in. When they hit the fire, they open up".

He used the spice blend dry and also mixed the blend in a salad dressing based sauce. He dabbed the spiced sauce on his signature "Ollie Burger" burger patties with a brush as they cooked, saying "Dab it on. Smell the bouquet, 23 natural organic seeds, we don't grind them, keeps the aromas intact". He explained the spice mix had to be applied to the outside of the hamburger, saying "... not herbs IN the meat, it would taste like a meat loaf". He also heavily dressed both sides of the burger bun with the sauce.

He used the same spice mixture dry as a seasoning on his fresh French fries, naming them "Ollie Fries". Fried in safflower oil, he said the secret to their taste was not cooking them a minute before the meal. He tossed the fries and his spice mixture together in a bowl lined with ten layers of filter paper.

=== Insistence on quality ===
In 1965, an Ollie Burger cost 60 cents (equivalent to $6 in 2024) at a time when 12 cent hamburgers were the national norm. Gleichenhaus had a sign posted in his diner's front window, "If you're more interested in price than quality, I don't want you". He said "Success isn't measured in money – I couldn't stand a hamburger joint where they serve garbage, even if it made me rich".

=== "The best hamburger in America" ===
John Y. Brown, Jr., had purchased Kentucky Fried Chicken from Harland Sanders, built it into an 830 million dollar franchise and sold it to spirits distributor Heublein in 1971. Brown then purchased Lum's Restaurant Group, a 340-outlet beer-and-hot-dog chain, for $4,000,000 in cash. Lum's franchises had lost $150,000 the previous year. According to Brown, "they did not have very good food. I figured that upgrading it would be my first task." Brown wanted to rebuild Lum's around an exclusive hamburger recipe and set out to find "the best hamburger in America".

Brown visited the Miami diner in the fall of 1971, ordering and slowly eating five of the ⅓-pound Ollie Burgers. Gleichenhaus questioned Brown's intense interest. "I said 'What's with this guy? Does he have a tapeworm or sumpin?'" After finishing his fifth Ollie Burger, Brown introduced himself and said the hamburgers were the best he had ever tasted.

Brown told Gleichenhaus he owned Lum's and wanted his Ollie Burger for the restaurant group. "I wouldn't drink coffee in that joint" Gleichenhaus replied. Brown pressed Gleichenhaus to sell him the recipe, saying "Ollie, I'm going to make you rich". Gleichenhaus said "John Y., what do I need rich for? I got security". Brown brought his family to sample the burgers, and they said they loved them. Brown brought friends to the diner, betting them $100 that the Ollie Burger was the best burger they had ever eaten. "To a man, Brown's friends left $100 poorer". A persistent Brown had someone contact Gleichenhaus every day for three months to no avail. Gleichenhaus said he worried "mass production would ruin his burger".

=== A winning appeal to ego ===
Finally, Brown appealed to Gleichenhaus's ego. He told Gleichenhaus that he wanted to make him "bigger than the Colonel" (Colonel Harland Sanders), putting his face and name in lights and his Ollie Burger on plates everywhere. Gleichenhaus said "He couldn't get me on the money angle, see, but when he told me my picture would be all over town like the Colonel's – everywhere you go you see the Colonel – I said 'Gee, that would be nice'". Gleichenhaus said "Three months I held him off, but I finally accepted his deal". Gleichenhaus closed the diner and left a sign in the window that read "Gone to be a star – back next week".

=== Sold for a million dollars ===
In 1971, Brown bought Gleichenhaus's recipe for $1 million (equivalent to $7,764,174 in 2024), stock in the new company and a ten-year contract for $50,000 a year (equivalent to $388,209 in 2024) to appear as the official spokesperson of the Ollieburger.

Investors were told that Gleichenhaus and his hamburger recipe with secret ingredients meant that "Ollie would be the Colonel Sanders of hamburgers". In 1972, "Ollieburger" was registered as a US trademark.

=== Scaling the recipe ===
Gleichenhaus worked with Lum's for over six months to standardize his recipes within the restaurant chain. Gleichenhaus insisted his hamburgers had to be cooked "on a gas fired grill" and cooked to just medium rare. He insisted when a hamburger was cooked to well done, "... then they're lousy. That's what I gotta watch. Somebody wants it well-done, I tell 'em they should order a hot dog. If they say they can't stand looking at pink meat, I tell 'em to close their eyes". He also said he had to keep his eye on the buns. "They've got to be at least ten percent egg and have a little honey. After all, when you're wearing a $300 suit, you don't put on sneakers to go with it".

He kept his seasoning recipe secret, having one half of his spice mix blended in Baltimore and the other half in Chicago. He said the two mixtures were combined "somewhere else". Gleichenhaus said the resulting mix of 23 spices was "better than Chanel No. 5".

Mass-producing Gleichenhaus's spicy sauce required extra effort. "Six months they took to make my formula. I sent them gallons of the stuff before the chemists could even come close and the spice companies said they'd never seen anything like it." Paramount Foods Inc. in Louisville, Kentucky, manufactured the sauce to Gleichenhaus's recipe.

Gleichenhaus had always cooked his Ollie Burgers to medium rare and used his years of experience to know when they had reached that point by feel. "How many got this touch?" he asked. "It's a science, a feel". The answer was found in a Louisville, Kentucky, test kitchen. A special "fire-flame" grill was developed that cooked both sides of the burger at the same time, to the exact desired doneness and temperature.

=== Lum's Restaurant ===
Gleichenhaus was unsure Lum's cooks could duplicate his masterpiece, saying: “Those yo-yos are looking for a short way to make my burgers, but there’s no way other than the right way".

Ollie Burgers were first test-marketed in Miami, Florida, and Columbus, Ohio. Brown then introduced the Ollieburger nationally as a signature item on the Lum's Restaurant group menu in all 300 locations. During test marketing of the Ollie Burger, sales at the Columbus, Ohio, Lum's jumped 35 per cent. 63 television commercials featuring Gleichenhaus in “an Archie Bunker kind of approach" were created and broadcast to build Gleichenhaus's image throughout the US.

In 1974, it was reported that the Ollie Burger had captured a 15 to 20% share of Lum's Restaurant food sales while their mainstay hot dog sales had fallen 6 to 7%. In 1975, Lum's advertised the Ollie Burger as "the heavy-weight champion of the world", touting its ⅓-pound weight as "outclassing and outweighing all the other ¼ pounders".

In 1977, Lum's restaurants advertised "The man who invented the Ollieburger presents ... The buck-and-a-half meal-and-a-half!" for $1.50 (equivalent to $8 in 2024). The deal offered diners an Ollie Burger, French fries and "a schooner of beer".

== Ollie's Trolley ==
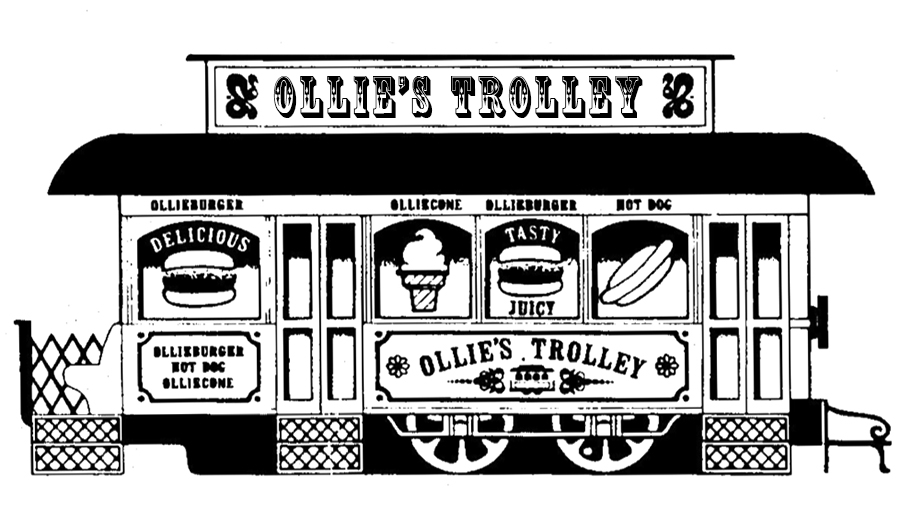
Ollie's Trolley restaurant design line drawing

While Brown had employees scouting America for the perfect hamburger for Lum's, Brown and his family went skiing in Aspen, Colorado. On a lift to the top of the mountain, Brown spotted a small trolley down below, selling popcorn. It reminded him of the trolleys in Louisville during his childhood. He said "Well, it was just sort of cute".

Brown decided that, while selling Ollieburgers at Lum's, he'd also sell them from small, stand-alone replica trolley cars. Brown then made the Ollieburger the centerpiece of his new streetcar-themed "Ollie's Trolley" fast food chain, where “the world’s best hamburger” was served up in bright yellow and red replicas of old-fashioned trolley cars. The initial trolleys were fabricated by Castle Industries, a modular housing fabricator in New Castle, Kentucky. With just one door in and one door out, Ollieburgers were sold as take-out only. The 20 by 12 foot "trolley car" stores barely held three or four customers at a time who entered, placed their order, waited in line and left with their food order in a paper sack. Brown planned to place at least one of these tiny streetcar restaurants in every city in America.

While burgers were the star, Ollie's Trolley also offered hotdogs, chicken sandwiches, milkshakes and spice-coated french fries named "Ollie Fries".

=== Spurious "Ollie Burger" and "Ollie Fries" spice recipes ===
Over the decades, nostalgic fans of Ollie's Trolley have tried to replicate Gleichenhaus's secret spice formulas. The internet is full of so-called "authentic" recipes that rely on spurious ingredients never mentioned by Gleichenhaus such as A.1. Steak Sauce, Heinz 57 steak sauce, crushed beef bouillon cubes and the like. These incorrect spice recipes often offer "proof" of their authenticity, saying "The recipe is 100% authentic. I know because I have already tried it". For many years, Gleichenhaus only mentioned using pure spices that were unground, used in their full form for intense flavor. He never referred to using bouillon cubes and cider vinegar. Authentic Ollie Burger spices and other spice blends used by the now defunct Lum's Restaurant group are still available.

=== Franchise start and expansion ===
The first Ollie's Trolley opened in March 1973 in Louisville, Kentucky. Four months later, John Y. Brown said the store "has a $100 a day break-even figure and it's already taking in about $600" (per day). International sales began with two units installed in Windsor, Ontario, Canada in July 1973.

By 1976, it was reported there were seventy-five Ollie's Trolleys in seven states. Twelve stores were located in Louisville, Kentucky. In 1978, it was reported that Ollie Burgers were available in 400 Lum's locations and 200 Ollie's Trolleys across America.

=== End of the franchise ===
Despite positive test market feedback, some found Ollie Burgers too spicy and too salty. The Ollie's Trolley "park, walk-in, take-out-only" concept also proved to be a problem as many fast food rivals began adding more convenient drive-through windows.

In 1982, John Y. Brown said "that venture (Ollie's Trolley) collapsed".

=== Counterfeit "Ollie Burgers" ===
In 1987, Gleichenhaus, who then held the US Trademark 1,104,558 for the word mark "Ollie", publicly protested the sale across America of counterfeit hamburgers named and being sold as "Ollie Burgers" due to the then media attention of Lt. Col. Oliver North. He said "They can't use my name".

== Humble in success ==
Gleichenhaus kept a keen sense of humility even though he had suddenly become a millionaire, a corporate spokesman and had appeared in countless parades, store openings and local and network television interviews and shows.

In 1972, it was reported that Gleichenhaus would visit his old and by then closed shop of 37 years and simply sweep the sidewalk because "he missed it".

Describing his recent success in 1976, he mentioned he still lived in Miami Beach, but had moved to an apartment with a swimming pool. He said "And I got what I wanted most: two bathrooms in my apartment. To me, that's the epitome of success".

== Death ==
Gleichenhaus died in Miami, Florida, on January 10, 1991, after open heart surgery. His Associated Press obituary quoted Terry, his wife of 34 years, who said of Gleichenhaus "He was a very vibrant, very outgoing person who never shut his mouth".
