= Red Flag – Alaska =

United States Air Force training exercise

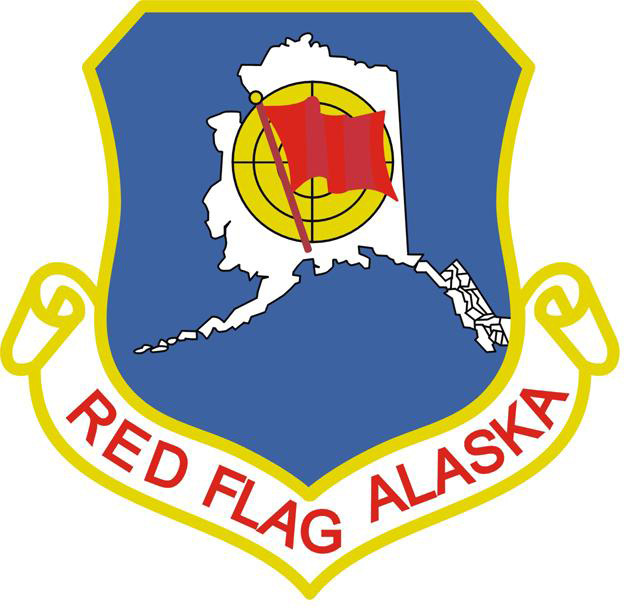
- Status: Active
- Genre: Military exercise
- Frequency: Tri-annually/Quad-annually
- Location: Alaska
- Country: United States
- Years active: 20
- Established: 2006
- Previous event: Red Flag-Alaska 19-3 (1–16 August 2018)
- Next event: Red Flag-Alaska 20-1 (30 April – 15 May 2019)
- Participants: United States Air Force & allied air forces
- Organiser: 353d Combat Training Squadron
- Sponsor: Pacific Air Forces

Red Flag-Alaska is a realistic, ten-day air combat United States Air Force (USAF) training exercise held up to four times a year. It is held at Eielson Air Force Base and Elmendorf Air Force Base in the State of Alaska. Each Red Flag-Alaska exercise is a multi-service, multi-platform coordinated, combat operations exercise and corresponds to the designed operational capability of participating units. In other words, exercises often involve several units whose military mission may differ significantly from that of other participating units. Red Flag-Alaska planners take those factors into consideration when designing exercises so participants get the maximum training possible without being placed at an unfair advantage during simulated combat scenarios.

== History ==
=== Cope Thunder ===
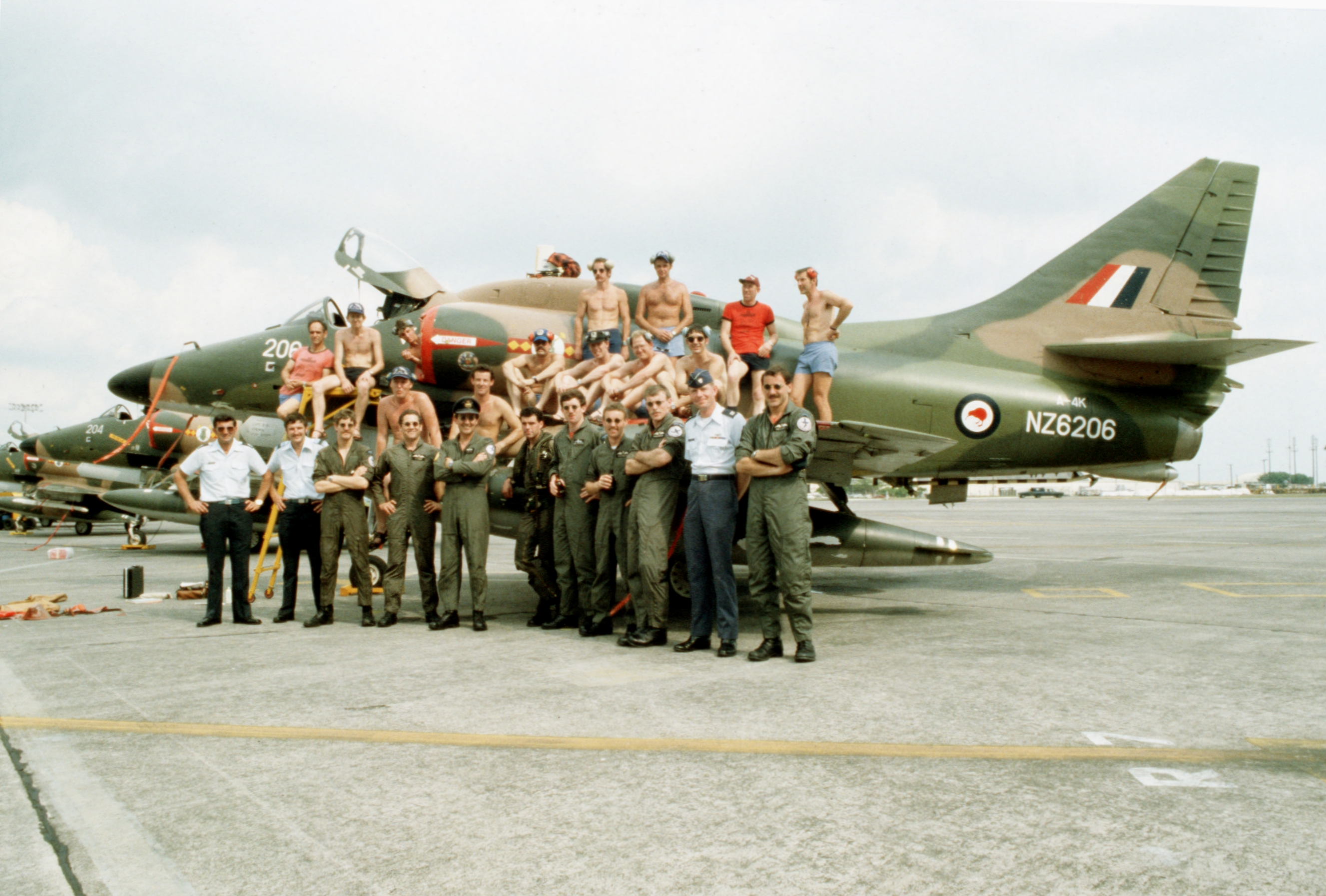
Aircrew of both the USAF and No. 75 Squadron RNZAF with one of the RNZAF’s A-4K Skyhawks in the Philippines during Cope Thunder in 1982

Exercise Cope Thunder was a Pacific Air Forces (PACAF) sponsored exercise initiated at Clark Air Base, the Philippines, in 1976. Conceived by Brigadier General Richard G. Head, the exercise was devised as a way to give aircrews from across Asia their first taste of warfare in a realistic training environment. The exercise quickly grew into PACAF's "premier simulated combat airpower employment exercise."

Prior to Operation Desert Storm, less than one-fifth of the U.S. Air Force's primary fighter pilots had seen combat. While the percentage of combat-experienced pilots has increased in recent years, with the end of the Vietnam War a high percentage of pilots had not experienced combat. Analysis indicates most combat losses occurred during an aircrew's first eight to 10 missions. Therefore, the goal of Cope Thunder was to provide each aircrew with these first vital missions, increasing their chances of survival in combat environments.

Each Cope Thunder exercise was a multi-service, combat operations exercise corresponding to the intended operational capability of participating units; exercises involved units whose military mission may differ significantly from that of other participating units. Cope Thunder planners took those factors into consideration when designing exercises so participants received the maximum training possible without being placed at an unfair advantage during simulated combat scenarios.

It was not uncommon during Cope Thunder exercises to see Philippine Air Force Northrop F-5, Royal Australian Air Force F/A-18 Hornets, U.S. Navy A-4 Skyhawks, Royal New Zealand Air Force A-4K Skyhawks, Republic of Singapore Air Force Hawker Hunters, stacked up on taxiways awaiting their turn to launch along with USAF F-15 Eagles, and F-16 Fighting Falcons from bases in PACAF, and Alaskan Air Command.

Cope Thunder was moved to Eielson Air Force Base, Alaska, from Clark Air Base, Philippines, in 1992 after the eruption of Mount Pinatubo on June 15, 1991 forced the closure of Clark Air Base.

When the decision was made to relocate Cope Thunder, Air Force officials viewed Eielson Air Force Base as the most logical choice. That decision was based on the close proximity of large areas of military training airspace and the fact that Eielson's 5055th Range Squadron, to become the 353d Combat Training Squadron in 1993, already maintained and operated three major military air-to-ground training ranges nearby.

Cope Thunder was redesignated Red Flag-Alaska in 2006.

=== Red Flag-Alaska ===
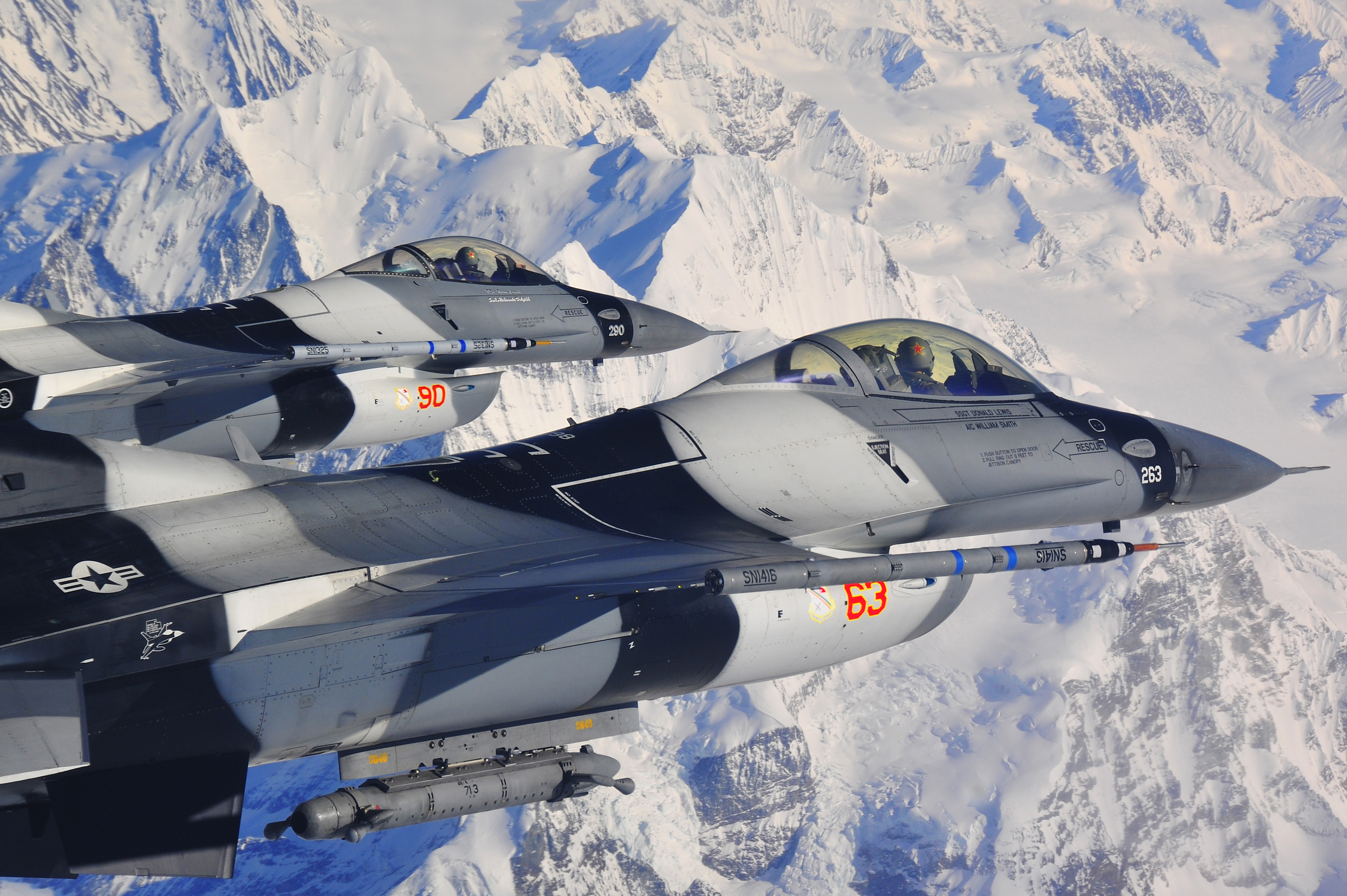
18th Aggressor Squadron F-16's from Eielson AFB during a Red Flag-Alaska mission.

Red Flag-Alaska is a PACAF sponsored exercise. Since its inception, thousands of people from all four branches of the US military, as well as the armed services of Australia, Canada, France, Germany, India, Italy, Japan, Malaysia, Mongolia, Netherlands, New Zealand, Norway, Poland, Philippines, Singapore, South Korea, Spain, Sweden, Thailand, Turkiye, and the United Kingdom, have taken part in multinational Red Flag-Alaska exercises.

Participating aircraft include A/OA-10, B-1B Lancer, B-2 Spirit, B-52 Stratofortress, C-130, C-160, E-2 Hawkeye, E-3 Sentry, F-15C, F-15E Strike Eagle, F-16 Fighting Falcon, F/A-18, F-22 Raptor, F-35 Lightning II, EA-6B, EA-18, KC-130, KC-135 Stratotanker, KC-10 Extender, HC-130, various helicopters and CF-18, Panavia Tornado, Hawker Siddeley Nimrod, Vickers VC10, Aero L-159 Alca, Sukhoi Su-30MKI, Eurofighter Typhoon, Mitsubishi F-2, JAS39 Gripen and SEPECAT Jaguar as well as Stinger teams from the Japan Self-Defense Forces.

== Operations ==
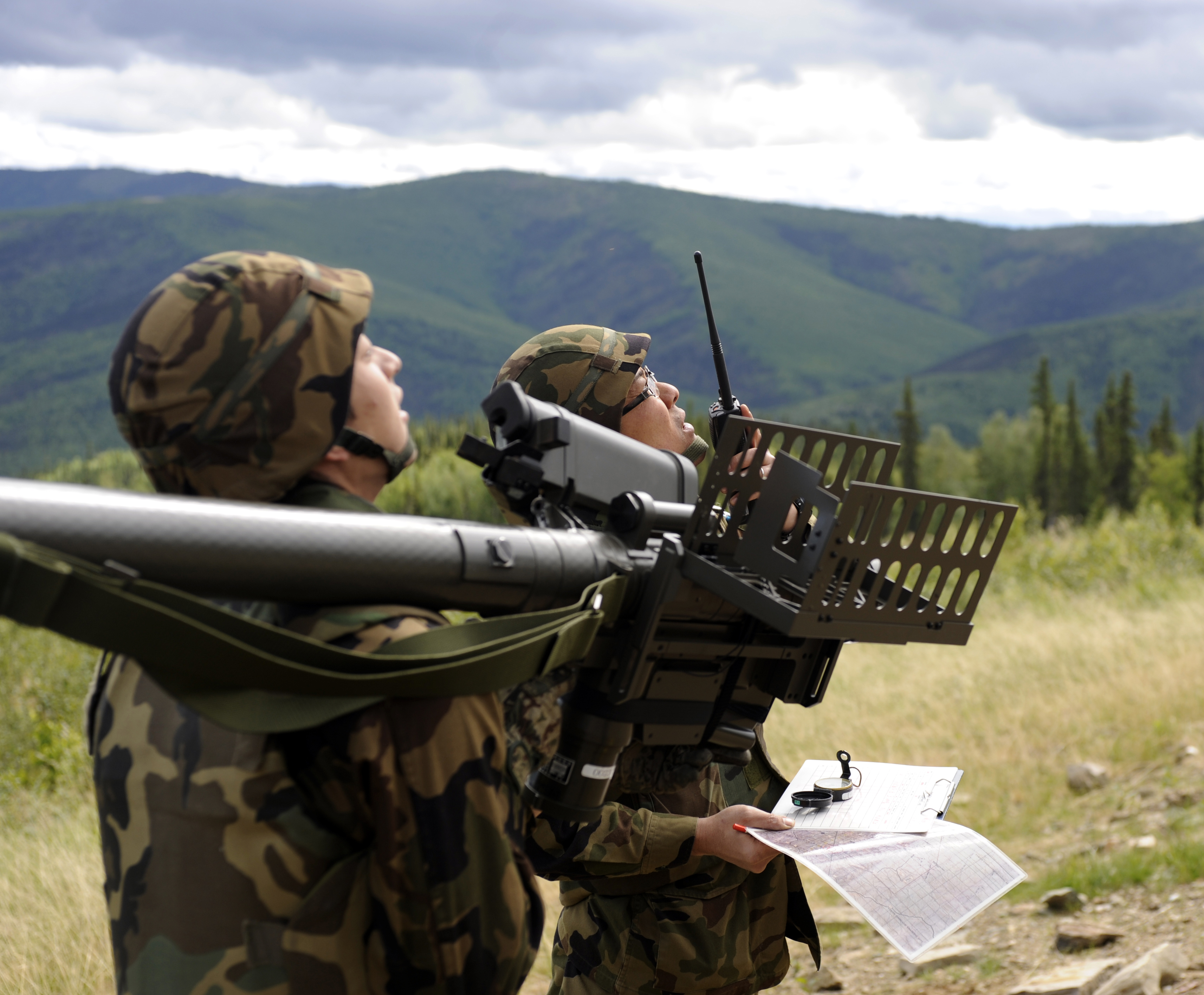
JASDF soldiers hunt for mock enemy aircraft at Eielson Air Force Base as part of Red-Flag Alaska. They are armed with a Type 91 Kai missile system

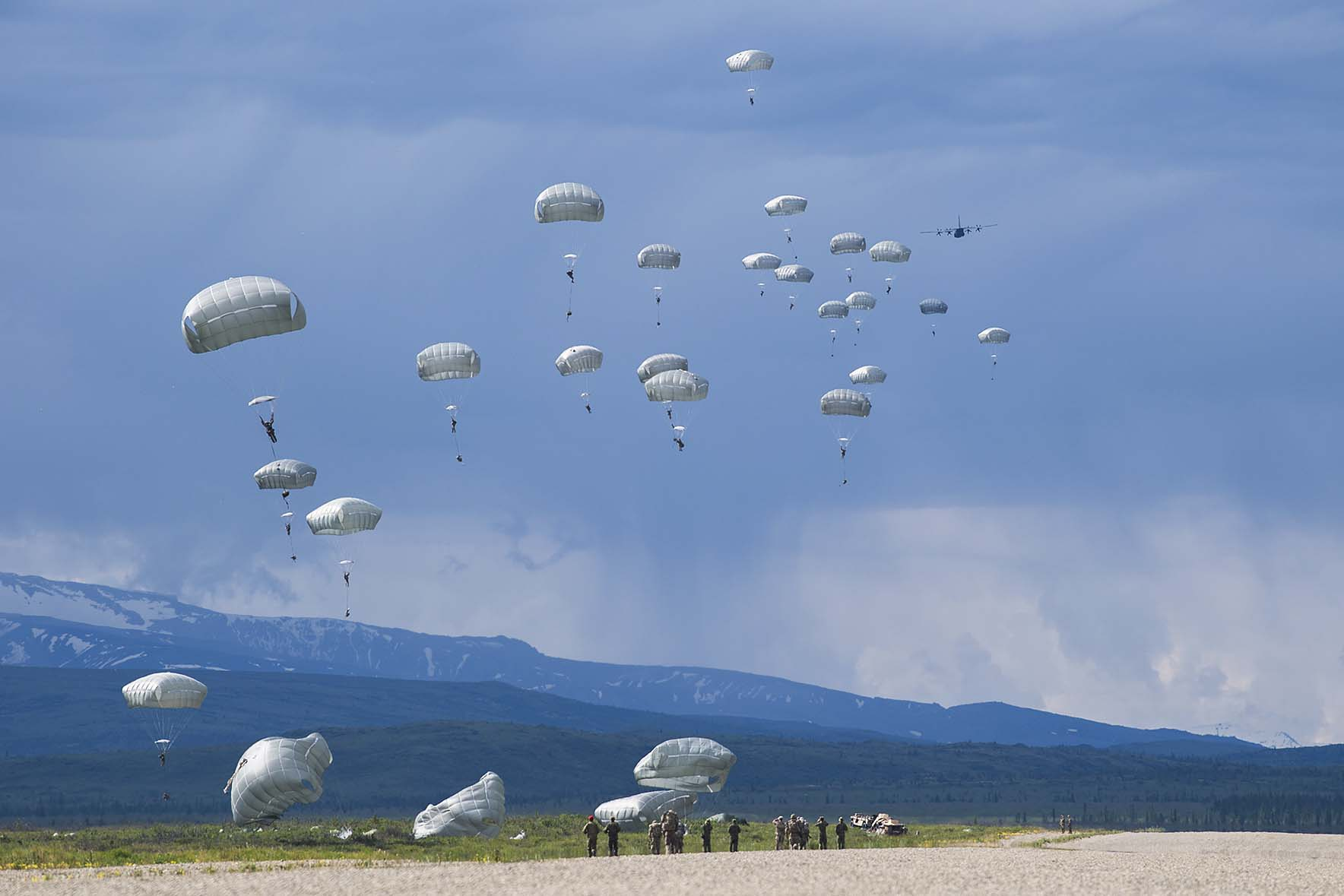
Soldiers perform a static line parachute jump in the 2019 exercises

Red Flag-Alaska participants are organized into "Red" aggressor (enemy) and "Blue" coalition (defensive) forces. "White" forces represent the neutral controlling agency. The defensive force includes ground-control intercept (GCI) and surface-to-air defensive forces to simulate threats posed by potentially hostile nations. These forces generally employ defensive counter-air tactics directed by GCI sites. Range threat emitters - electronic devices which send out signals simulating anti-aircraft artillery (AAA) and surface-to-air missile (SAM) launches - provide valuable surface-to-air training and are operated by a civilian contractor as directed by 353d Combat Training Squadron staff personnel.

The offensive force includes the full spectrum of U.S. and allied tactical and support units. Because the defensive and offensive forces meet in a simulated hostile, non-cooperative training environment, the job of controlling the mock war and ensuring safety falls to the "White" neutral force.

On an average, more than 700 people and up to 60 aircraft deploy to Eielson, and an additional 500 people and 40 aircraft deploy to Elmendorf Air Force Base, for each Red Flag-Alaska exercise. Most participating Red Flag-Alaska units arrive a week prior to the actual exercise. During that time, aircrews may fly one or two range orientation flights, make physical and mental preparations, hone up on local flying procedures and restrictions, receive local safety and survival briefings, and work on developing orientation plans.

During the two-week employment phase of the exercise, aircrews are subjected to a wide range of combat threats. Scenarios are shaped to meet each exercise's specific training objectives. All units are involved in the development of exercise training objectives. At the height of the exercise, up to 70 aircraft can be operating in the same airspace at one time. Typically, Red Flag-Alaska conducts two combat missions each day.

All Red Flag-Alaska exercises take place in the Joint Pacific Alaska Range Complex airspace located in eastern Alaska. The entire airspace is made up of 18 permanent Military Operations Areas (MOA), 11 Air Traffic Control Assigned Airspace (ATCAA) high altitude training areas and three restricted areas (R2202, R2205, R2211), for a total airspace of more than 68,000 square miles (180,000 km^{2}), roughly the size of the state of Oklahoma. Occasionally, adjoining airspace in western Canada is used.

Aircrew aren't the only ones who benefit from the Red Flag-Alaska experience. Exercises provide an operations training environment for participants such as unit-level intelligence experts, maintenance crews, command and control elements as well as staff and planning personnel.

By providing generic scenarios using common worldwide threats and simulated combat conditions, Red Flag-Alaska gives participants activities for large scale, in-depth, but applicable exercise.

August 16, 2018 marked the first time a RQ-4 Global Hawk had been integrated into a Red Flag-Alaska exercise. June 2019 saw the exercise debut of a MQ-9 Reaper during Red Flag – Alaska 19–2. Pilots from the 174th Attack Wing Hancock Air Force Base, New York, more than 4,000 miles away flew the drones remotely.

== See also ==
- Exercise Red Flag
- Maple Flag
- Aces Meet
