= Lum's =

U.S. family restaurant chain

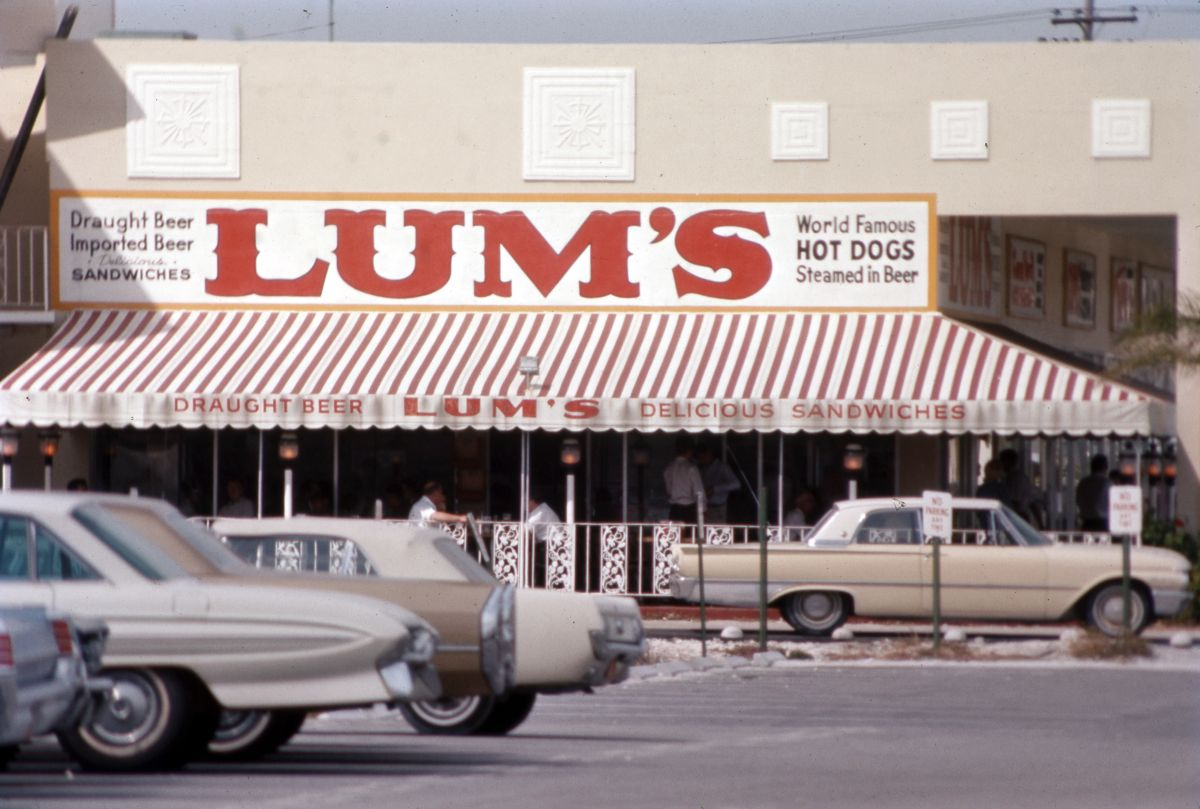
- Lum's in Fort Lauderdale, Florida, 1966
- Type: Subsidiary
- Industry: Restaurant chain
- Founded: 1956; 70 years ago in Miami Beach, Florida
- Founder: Clifford S. Perlman, Stuart Perlman
- Defunct: 1982; 44 years ago
- Fate: Bankruptcy & Liquidation; a few franchisees remained in independent operation until 2017
- Headquarters: US
- Number of locations: ~400 (1971) at peak
- Area served: United States
- Parent: Wienerwald

Lum's was an American family restaurant chain based in Florida with additional locations in several states. It was founded in 1956 in Miami Beach, Florida, by Stuart and Clifford S. Perlman when they purchased Lum's hot dog stand for $10,000. Over the next few years, the Perlman brothers opened three additional Lum's restaurants, for a total of four by 1961.

Clifford Perlman, in addition to owning Lum's, had been serving as the president of Southern Wood Industries, Inc., resigned that position to work full-time for Lum's. Under the brothers, Lum's began aggressively expanding and franchising; the signature item was hot dogs steamed in beer. In 1969, Lum's, Inc., was admitted to the New York Stock Exchange.

Lum's, Inc., purchased Caesars Palace for $60 million in 1969. At that time, Caesars was a 500-room hotel-casino on the Las Vegas strip. The food operations of Lum's, Inc., were sold in 1971 to John Y. Brown, then chairman of Kentucky Fried Chicken, along with a group of investors. At the time of sale, the company owned and franchised 400 stores in the continental US, Hawaii, Puerto Rico, and Europe.

Brown sought to improve the menu, and searched America for "the perfect hamburger". In 1971, Brown bought Ollie Gleichenhaus's "Ollie Burger" recipe for $1 million (equivalent to $7,949,877 in 2025), along with stock in the new company and a ten-year contract for $50,000 a year to appear as the official spokesperson of the Ollieburger on behalf of Lum's.

In 1978, Wienerwald Holdings, A.G., a Swiss holding company and parent of the Wienerwald restaurant chain, under the direction of Friedrich Jahn, purchased the 273 restaurant chain from Brown. Wienerwald had overextended itself and was forced to file for bankruptcy in 1982. Two Jahn-controlled Lum's franchisees were also forced to close all of their 70 Lum's locations and file for bankruptcy.

The original Lum's location closed in 1983. For a time, there was only one Lum's operating, in Bellevue, Nebraska. In 2010 a Lum's opened in Seekonk, Massachusetts, but later closed, leaving the Nebraska restaurant as the sole location. The Bellevue location closed on May 28, 2017.

For a time in the 1970s, the company's commercial spokesman was Milton Berle.

Lum's is shown briefly in Martin Scorsese's 2019 film The Irishman.

== See also ==
- List of defunct fast-food restaurant chains
