= Wienerwald (restaurant) =

German franchise chain for fast food

Wienerwald GmbH
- Type: Private
- Founded: 1955; 71 years ago, in Munich, Bavaria, Germany
- Headquarters: Hildesheim, Lower Saxony, Germany
- Key people: Friedrich Jahn, Evelyn Peitzner, Margot Steinberg
- Services: Fast-food (hendl, schnitzel) restaurants franchising
- Website: www.wienerwald.de

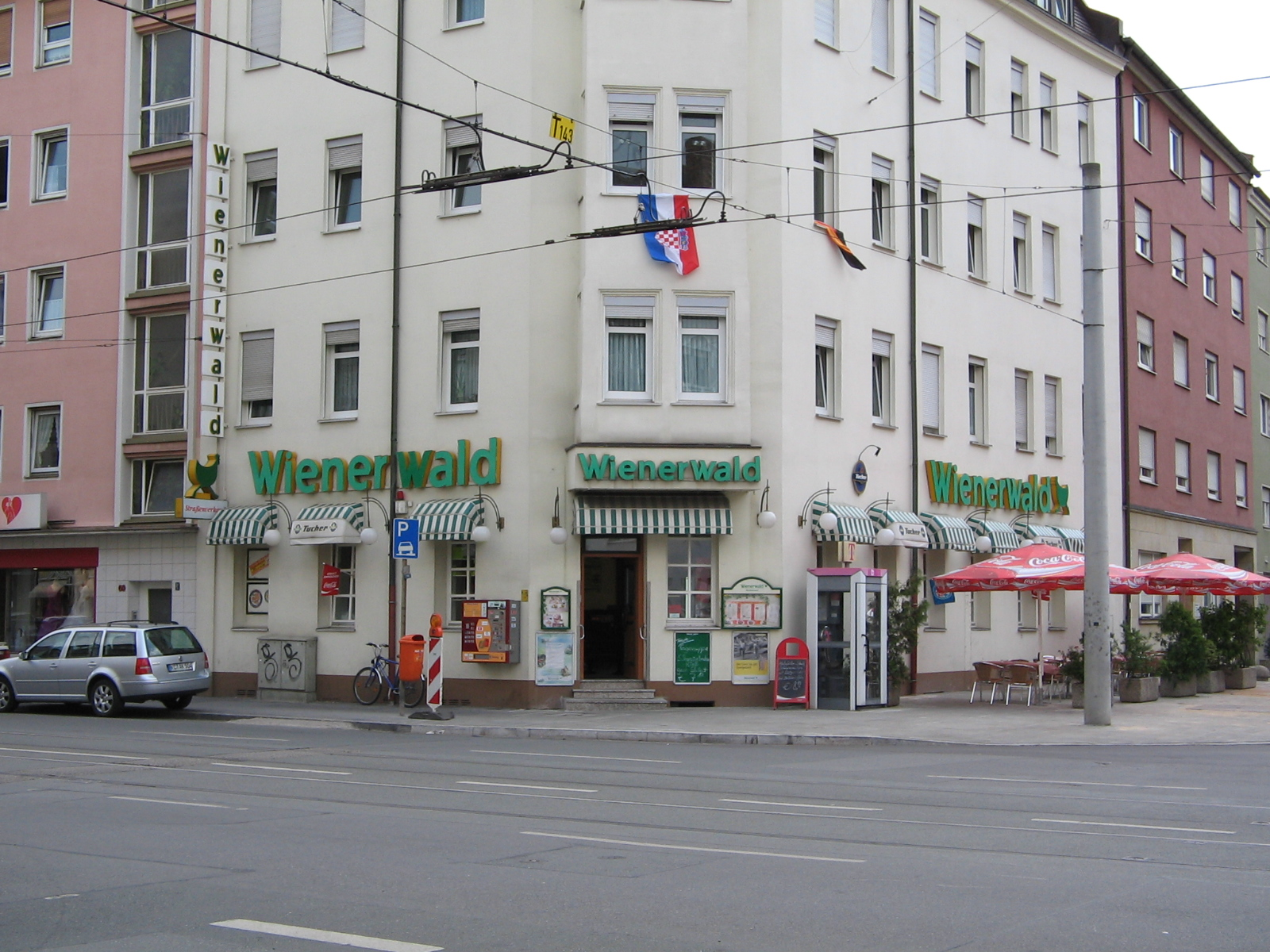
A Wienerwald restaurant in Nuremberg, Germany

Wienerwald GmbH is a German chain of franchised fast food restaurants, specializing in chicken – especially hendl (a type of roast chicken), schnitzel, and other similar products. Its name means Vienna Woods.

As of 2022 there were five Wienerwald restaurants in Germany and three in Egypt. Previously, the company had also operated in Australia, Austria, Belgium, Finland, Hungary, The Netherlands, Romania, Turkey, the United Arab Emirates, and the United States.

== History ==
Founded in 1955 by Linz restaurateur Friedrich Jahn (1923 – 1998) in Munich, Wienerwald rapidly grew to become Europe's largest restaurant chain with more than 1600 restaurants in 1978.

In 1978, Wienerwald purchased the 273-restaurant Lum's chain from the former owner of Kentucky Fried Chicken, John Y. Brown Jr. The chain's inability to market its outlets as providers of chicken (rather than overcoming the US misconception that "Wienerwald" was a wiener chain), plus the huge growth in 1978 brought enormous debts. Many of the restaurants in the US and Europe had to close, and Wienerwald declared bankruptcy in 1982, divesting itself of its 880 restaurants in the United States.

The chain recovered, but failed to return to its former glory; sales and restaurant numbers declined and many foreign markets were abandoned. In 2003, and again in 2007, Wienerwald filed for bankruptcy again, which resulted in further closures of restaurants and further release of employees.

In 2007, Friedrich Jahn's daughters Margot Steinberg and Evelyn Peitzner purchased the company and Wienerwald started a new era. In order to become competitive again, the chain modernized and adjusted its concept, shifting from casual dining more towards fast food – with orders placed and picked up at the counter instead of the customer being served at the table – and also upgrading the interior design. In June 2009 the first Wienerwald in Turkey opened in Istanbul, but despite a rapid expansion—temporarily reaching 30 branches—the market has been abandoned. The first Romanian restaurant in Bucharest opened in April 2011, but subsequently the company withdrew from Romania as well.

At the end of 2017, 23 restaurants remained in Germany (sited most densely in Bavaria), three in Greater Cairo and one each in Budapest and in Dubai. The following years witnessed further decline. After a restructuring, a new Wienerwald concept and design was introduced in the Lower Saxon locations of Torfhaus (Upper Harz region) and Hildesheim. A still existing Wienerwald restaurant in Munich was rebranded in mid-2023; several other restaurants were set to continue business independently under alternative names with a concept similar to the known one. In Hanover, the last restaurant of the previous kind operated under the Wienerwald brand until the end of 2023, before the rights to use the name expired and the restaurant would continue to operate under a different name.

== Wienerwald Restaurants GmbH (Austria) ==
In Austria, Friedrich Jahn sold all Wienerwald restaurants to a different owner in 1986, thus separating the Austrian restaurants from the rest of the company. On August 5, 2025, this Austrian branch of Wienerwald filed for bankruptcy. Pending bankruptcy proceedings, the detached spin out company Wienerwald Restaurants GmbH continues to operate some casual dining restaurants with a similar menu as of September 2025.

== See also ==
- List of fast-food chicken restaurants
