= Champion Air =

US-american charter airline (1995–2008)

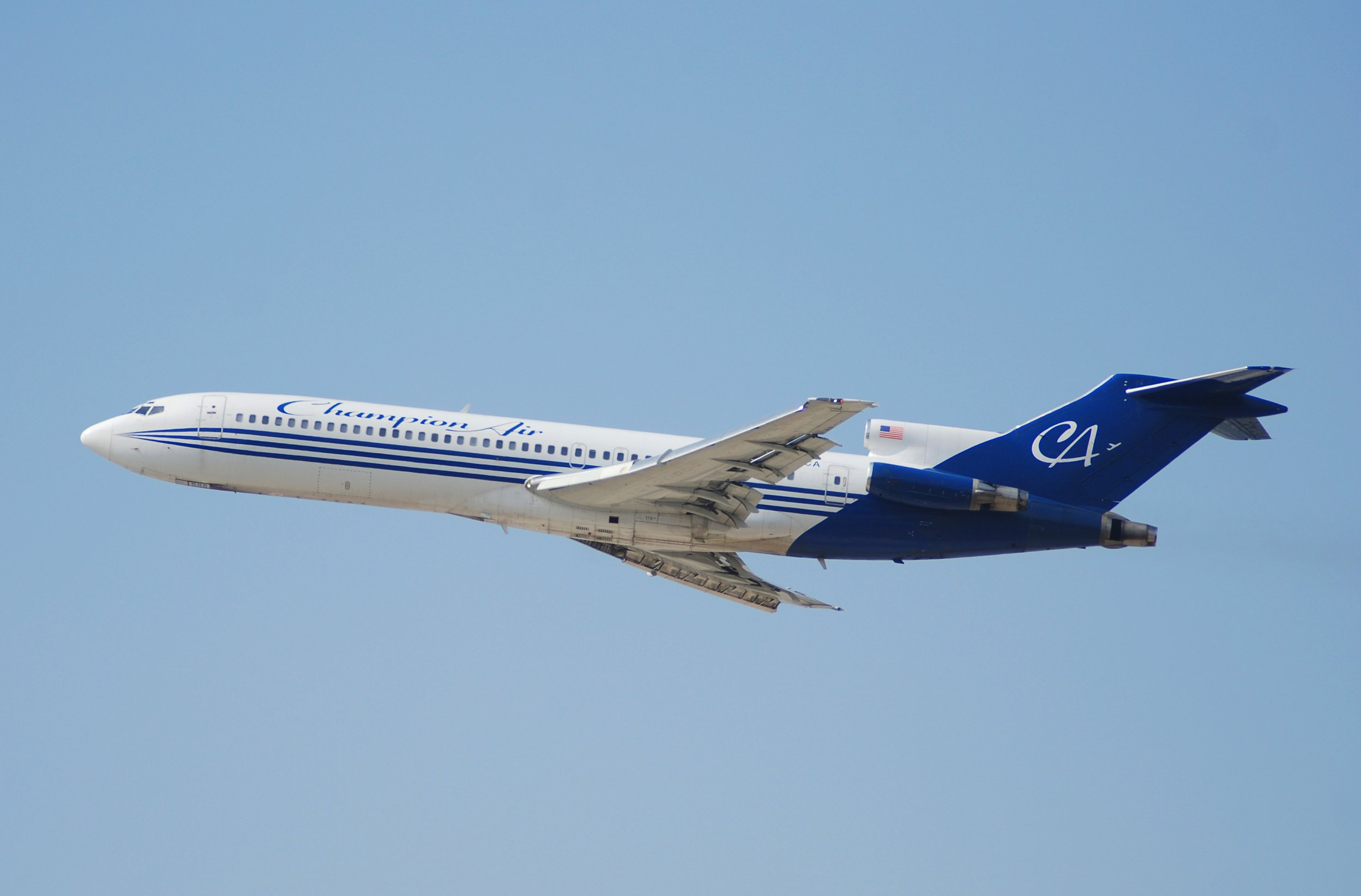
- Champion Air Boeing 727
IATA	ICAO	Call sign
MG	CCP	CHAMPION AIR
- Founded: July 1995
- Ceased operations: May 31, 2008
- Operating bases: Dallas/Fort Worth; Denver; Detroit; Las Vegas; Minneapolis/St. Paul; Oklahoma City; St. Louis
- Fleet size: 16
- Destinations: Varied
- Parent company: Grand Holdings Inc
- Headquarters: Bloomington, Minnesota, USA
- Key people: Lee Steele (CEO)
- Website: www.championair.com

Champion Air was an airline based in Bloomington, Minnesota, USA. It primarily operated air charter services for sports teams, vacation wholesalers, and government agencies. It also offered limited scheduled service. Its main base was Minneapolis-Saint Paul International Airport, with hubs at Denver International Airport, Dallas/Fort Worth International Airport, Detroit Metropolitan Wayne County Airport, Harry Reid International airport in Las Vegas, Lambert-St. Louis International Airport, and Will Rogers World Airport in Oklahoma City. The airline ceased all operations on May 31, 2008. Until its shutdown, the airline was a prime contractor for the Justice Prisoner and Alien Transportation System.

== History ==
In 1987, MGM Grand Air (IATA: MG, ICAO: MGM, call sign: Grand Air), a scheduled passenger and charter airline owned by MGM Grand, Inc, with a focus on operating VIP charters with luxurious aircraft, was established, starting operations in September 1987. Operating McDonnell Douglas DC-8-62 and Boeing 727-100 jet aircraft in lavish configurations, MGM Grand Air operated scheduled passenger service between Los Angeles International Airport (LAX) (via the West Imperial Terminal located on the southside of LAX) and John F Kennedy International Airport (JFK) in New York City using aircraft with all premium seating configurations as well as a shuttle service between LAX and John Wayne Airport (SNA) in Orange County, CA flown with small de Havilland Canada DHC-6 Twin Otter turboprops in addition to charter flights operated with its jet aircraft. MGM Grand also operated the Boeing 757-200 jetliner and had its headquarters in El Segundo, California.

By 1994, with business jets gaining popularity with celebrities and business leaders, MGM Grand Air was no longer profitable, and the company sought to sell it off. The buyer was Front Page Tours, a small tour operator based in Edina, Minnesota dedicated to providing airlift to sports teams and their fans to major sporting events. The air operator's certificate was purchased from MGM Grand Air in July 1995. The name was changed to Champion Air and the fleet was standardized on the Boeing 727.

In March 1997, Minnesota Twins owner Carl Pohlad and Northwest Airlines acquired the company from Richard Page. The airline relocated to Minneapolis, Minnesota, where it shared facilities and resources with Northwest. Champion Air replaced Sun Country Airlines as the leading charter operator for Northwest-owned MLT Vacations. In 2003, five Champion Air executives supposedly completed a management buy-out to take control of the airline. This was a facade created to prevent the higher-cost NWA pilots and union from forcing the group to shifting the flying to NWA's union pilots. The airline continued to operate both VIP and general charters for MLT and other operators. Champion Air continued to be run behind the scenes by Northwest executives, including an all-NWA board of directors.

However, in late summer 2007 Champion Air management was informed that MLT passengers would be moved from Champion Air to Northwest's own flights throughout the 2008 year. This was a significant blow, as MLT Vacations accounted for roughly 75-80 percent of all operations. In January 2008, it was disclosed that Champion's contract to provide charter flights for 13 National Basketball Association teams would also be taken over by Northwest, who had hired several Champion Air pilots in the preceding months.

On March 31, 2008, Champion Air president and CEO Lee Steele announced that the airline would voluntarily liquidate, with all flight operations ceasing as of May 31. He cited high fuel costs and the inefficiency of their aging Boeing 727-200 fleet as some of the major reasons behind the shutdown, and stated that the airline's business model "is no longer viable in a world of $110 oil, a struggling economy and rapidly changing demand for our services".

The airline was wholly owned by Champion Air Management and had 737 employees as of January 2005.

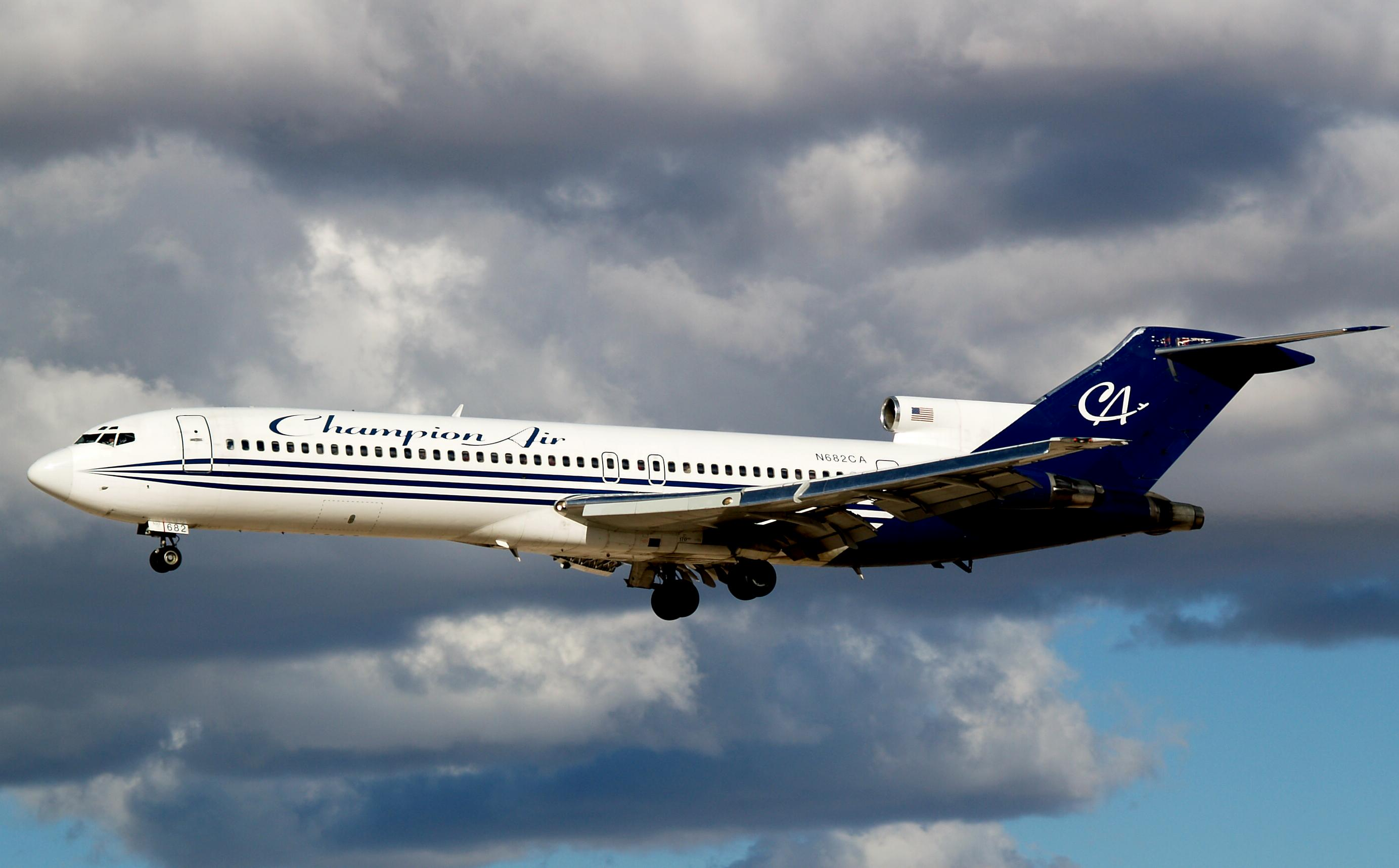
A Champion Air 727 landing at McCarran International Airport.

== Fleet ==
As of March 2007 the Champion Air fleet included:

- 6 Boeing 727-200 Advanced aircraft equipped with 56 Business Class Seating
- 10 Boeing 727-200 Advanced aircraft equipped with all Coach Class Seating

== In popular culture ==
A former Champion Air 727-200 (known as N293AS during Champion Air ownership) was used in a 2012 experiment where the aircraft was crashed on a dried lake in Northern Mexico.

== See also ==
- List of defunct airlines of the United States
