= Réseau Ferré National (France) =

French state-owned railway infrastructure

Evolution of the national rail network from 1826 to 2020

In France, the Réseau Ferré National (RFN) is made up of railroad lines and infrastructure belonging to the French state, and assigned to SNCF Réseau.

The Société nationale des chemins de fer français (SNCF) was responsible for the network from January 1, 1983, when it was set up as an "établissement public à caractère industriel et commercial" (EPIC), until February 13, 1997, on the basis of the network conceded by the State, which had built it up since 1938 from the networks of the former major railway companies. From February 13, 1997, to December 31, 2014, the national rail network belonged to the EPIC Réseau ferré de France (RFF), with maintenance and operation delegated to SNCF. On January 1, 2015, following the demise of RFF, the network became the property of SNCF Réseau, which manages and operates it directly. In 2020, it will become the property of the French State, while remaining entrusted to SNCF Réseau.

By 2018, with over 28,000 km of track in operation and more than 2,800 stops and stations served, France has the second largest network in Europe (behind Germany), as well as the leading network of high-speed lines. Most of the network's traffic (81%) is passenger traffic (1.35 billion people carried, with an average occupancy rate of 45%). However, trains face stiff competition from trucks, roads, and even airplanes. France has developed its high-speed network but has abandoned many small lines and stations, making access to certain services more difficult in rural areas. These short lines are considered unprofitable, due to their high cost for low ridership, as well as their environmental impact when not electrified.

== History ==
=== Under old companies ===
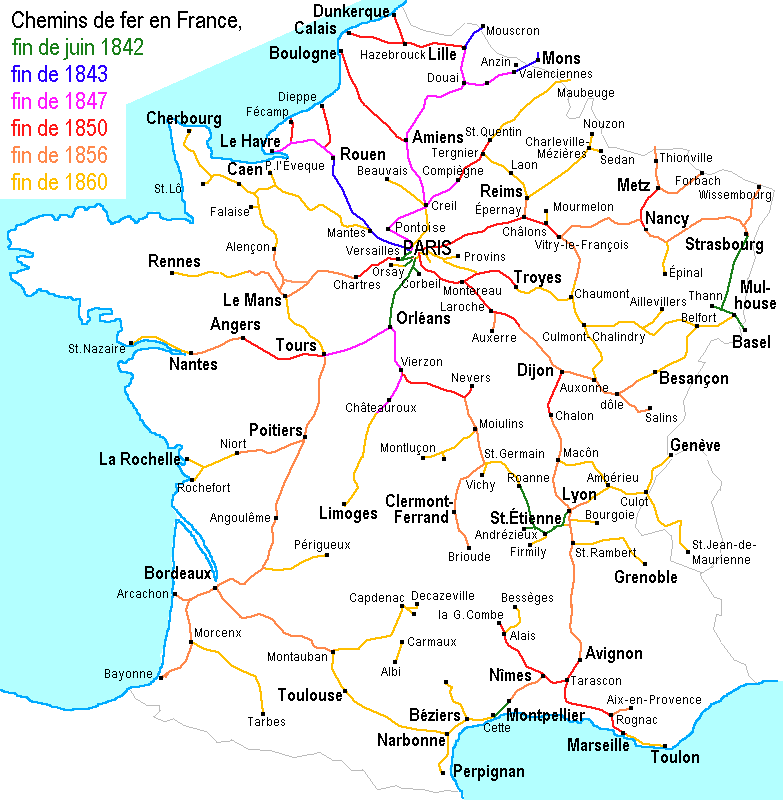
Development of the French rail network in the 19th century

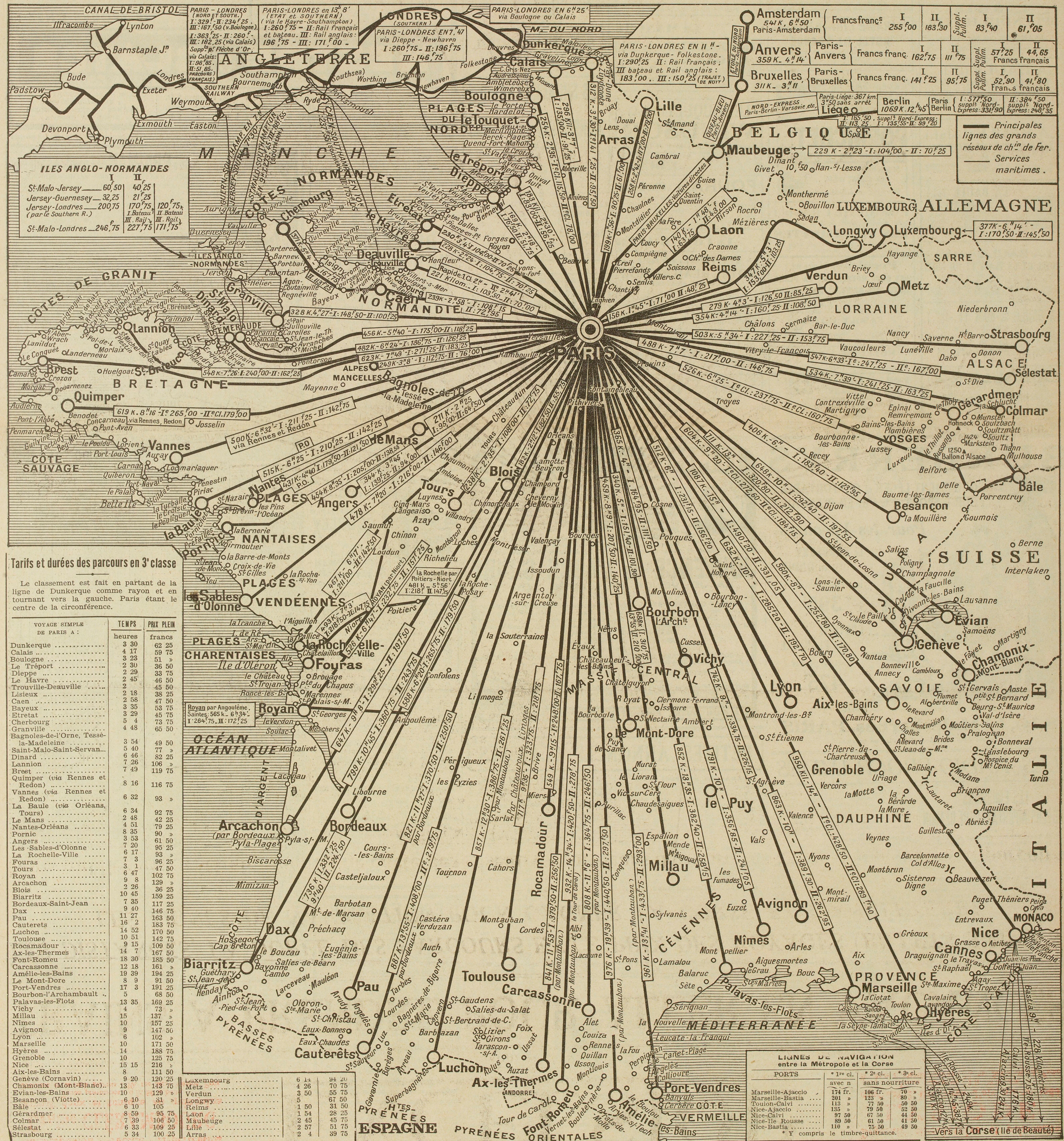
Trains to take on vacation from Paris, published in the Excelsior journal on June 21st, 1934

The very first French railroad line, and also the first in continental Europe, was the Saint-Étienne–Andrézieux railway, granted by order of King Louis XVIII to Louis-Antoine Beaunier in 1823 and opened on June 30, 1827. The 18 km line was designed to transport coal from the mines in the Loire coalfield to the river. It opened to passengers on March 1, 1832.

The law on the establishment of major railway lines (also known as the "Railway Charter"), passed on June 11, 1842, defined the French railroad system, creating a model of public-private partnership. The State became the owner of the land on which the lines were to be constructed and financed the construction of the infrastructure (engineering structures and buildings). Use of the line was then granted to private companies, who built the superstructure (tracks and facilities), invested in rolling stock, and enjoyed a monopoly of operation on their lines.

The rail network rapidly expanded throughout the country. The network was built from Paris in the form of a star network, known as the Legrand star.

The Freycinet plan, adopted in 1879, envisaged linking each sub-prefecture to the rail network.

The network reached 3,000 km by 1852, 17,000 km by 1870, and 26,000 km by 1882.

Alsace-Lorraine was annexed to the German Empire in 1871. As a result, its rail network was operated by the Kaiserliche Generaldirektion der Eisenbahnen in Elsaß-Lothringen (Imperial Railways in Alsace-Lorraine - EL). When Alsace-Lorraine returned to France after World War I, this network was operated by the Administration des chemins de fer d'Alsace et de Lorraine, created in 1919 and managed by the State, since the Compagnie des chemins de fer de l'Est, which had operated it before 1871, did not wish to take it over.

By 1914, the French general-interest rail network had reached 39,400 km, rising to 42,000 km at its peak in the late 1920s. Added to this was the voie ferrée d'intérêt local, with a maximum extension in 1928 of 20,921 km of lines, operated directly by the general councils or by various private companies on behalf of the départements. The total represents some 63,000 km of track in mainland France. This local network declined rapidly from the 1930s onwards, with 70 km remaining in 2010.

In 1937, just before the creation of the SNCF, the French rail network was operated by the Compagnie des chemins de fer du Nord (Nord), the Compagnie des chemins de fer de l'Est (Est), the communauté d'intérêt financière, commerciale et technique des Compagnies des chemins de fer de Paris à Orléans and du Midi et du Canal latéral à la Garonne (known as PO-Midi), the Compagnie des chemins de fer de Paris à Lyon et à la Méditerranée (PLM), plus the Syndicats du chemin de fer de Grande Ceinture et de Petite Ceinture and the two national administrations, chemins de fer d'Alsace-Lorraine (AL) and chemins de fer de l'État (État).

=== Under the SNCF ===
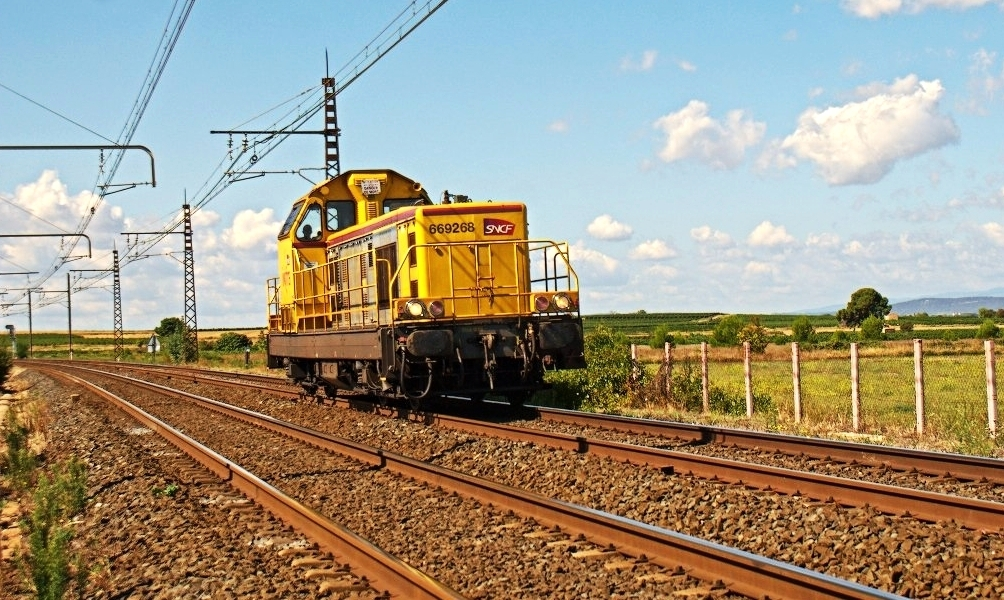
An SNCF Infra BB 69000

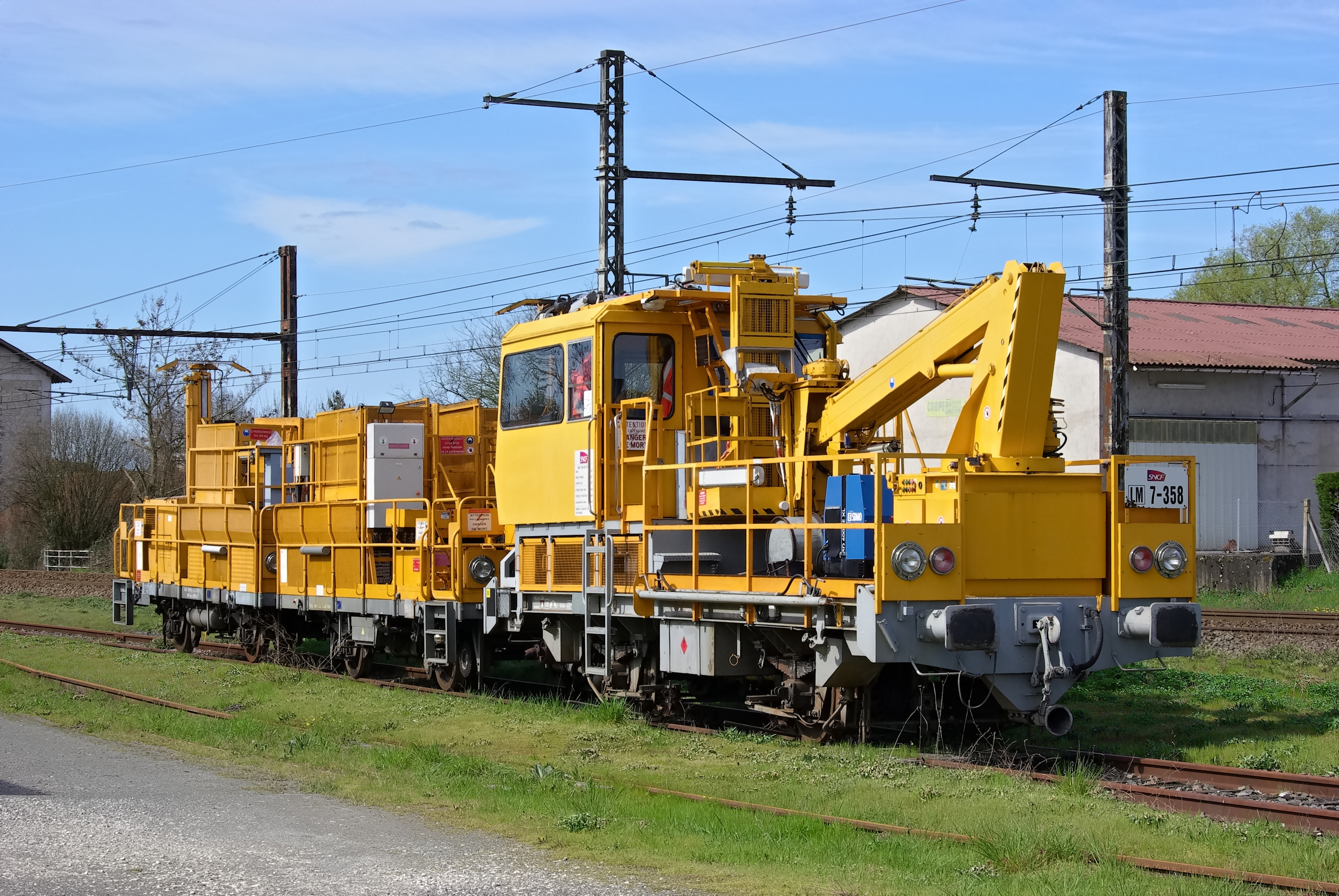
An SNCF work train

The Société nationale des chemins de fer français was created by agreement on August 31, 1937, between the French government and the various private railway companies of the day: Nord, Est, PO, Midi, PLM, the Grande Ceinture and Petite Ceinture railway unions, and the national administrations of the Alsace and Lorraine railways and the state railways. On January 1, 1938, the operation of the lines of these former companies, unions, and administrations was transferred to the new SNCF, while the former railway companies remained owners of their own private domain.

At the time of its creation, the SNCF was a semi-public company, operating a network of 42,500 km of track (8% of which was electrified) and organized around five regions: East, North, West, South-East and South-West. These regions correspond to the networks of the former companies, with the Alsace-Lorraine network integrated into the East region. The SNCF also operates the lines conceded by the Société royale grand-ducale des chemins de fer Guillaume-Luxembourg (GL), which were previously operated by the Administration des chemins de fer d'Alsace et de Lorraine.

The creation of the SNCF was accompanied by the strengthening of the rail-road coordination policy initiated in 1934, which led to a major program of line closures. By the end of 1939, 9,546 km were closed to passenger service, most of them in 1938 and 1939. The vast majority, however, continued to be used for freight services, pending the generally later closure to all traffic. Passenger and freight closures continued from the 1950s onwards, reaching a total of over 17,000 km of lines closed to all traffic in 2011.

After the second German annexation of Alsace-Lorraine, the Deutsche Reichsbahn managed the Alsace-Moselle and Guillaume-Luxembourg rail networks during World War II, from July 1, 1940, until the Liberation (from September 1944).

The sixth region, Méditerranée, was created in 1947.

France's first high-speed line, the LGV Sud-Est, was inaugurated on September 22, 1981.

On January 1, 1983, SNCF became an Établissement Public à Caractère Industriel et Commercial (EPIC).

=== The creation of RFF ===
Réseau ferré de France (RFF) was created on February 13, 1997, as a split-off from SNCF.

The aim was to separate two distinct activities: railway infrastructure management on the one hand, and the organization of transport services on the other. It was a response to European directives aimed at creating a supranational railway area. It had two consequences: by taking over infrastructure-related debts, RFF reduced SNCF's debt, and by managing only the infrastructure, it allowed the network to be opened up to other operators without any risk of conflict of interest.

However, while RFF became the owner of the network, Infra, the network maintenance and operations department, remained with SNCF. This allowed RFF to call on third-party companies when they are less expensive.

Ownership of the "public railway domain" was transferred for the most part to Réseau ferré de France when it was created in 1997: 30,000 kilometers of lines in service and 108,000 hectares spread over more than 10,000 communes. The SNCF, for its part, retained ownership of the "industrial tracks" (equipment maintenance workshops, depots, goods halls, etc.) as well as commercial and administrative buildings (notably passenger station buildings), covering a total of 7,000 hectares. Certain areas, proportionally very limited but quantitatively not insignificant, remained disputed for a long time before the French government imposed external arbitration between 2005 and 2006.

Between February 13, 1997, and December 31, 2014, Réseau ferré de France owned and managed the national rail network, with Société nationale des chemins de fer français (SNCF) as delegated manager (as defined by Decree 2002–1359), which in practice consists of all rail infrastructure: tracks, platforms, signal boxes; the passenger buildings in stations, as well as several hundred service tracks for parking rolling stock, are still owned by SNCF.

=== Reuniting RFF and SNCF ===
A new reform of the rail system was adopted by the Senate and National Assembly in 2014. It provides for the reunification of SNCF and RFF into a single entity on January 1, 2015. A new organization was set to be put in place. The SNCF will be structured around three EPICs: the head company SNCF, the infrastructure manager SNCF Réseau, and SNCF Mobilités, responsible for train operations.

RFF ceased to exist on December 31, 2014, and the new SNCF organization took effect on January 1, 2015.

The SNCF (through SNCF Réseau and SNCF Mobilités) then became the owner of the national rail network and all railway stations and infrastructure, as well as the owner, manager, and operator of the network.

The 2015 law on the new territorial organization of the Republic (NOTRe) gives regions and inter-municipalities the opportunity to become owners of capillary freight lines on the national rail network. Capillary freight lines represent around 3,000 km of track (or 10% of the RFN).

Two new high-speed lines went into service on July 2, 2017: the LGV Bretagne-Pays de la Loire and the LGV Sud Europe Atlantique, the latter financed by a public-private partnership. At the inauguration of the LGV Bretagne-Pays de la Loire, President Emmanuel Macron declared: "the promise I want us to keep together for the years to come is this: (...) not to relaunch major new projects, but to commit to financing infrastructure renewal".

Article 9 of Ordinance no. 2019-552 of June 3, 2019, containing various provisions relating to the SNCF group, assigns ownership of the national rail network to the State, while declaring SNCF Réseau, which will become a public limited company in January 2020, to be responsible for this network.

=== Line closure ===
After an initial wave of closures, essentially limited to passenger services in 1938 and 1939, as a result of transport coordination measures, closures resumed after World War II, extending to lines still open to freight traffic.

Kilometres of closures by period
| Years | until 1939 | 1940-1949 | 1950-1959 | 1960-1969 | 1970-1979 | 1980-1989 | 1990-1999 | 2000-2009 | Total |
|---|---|---|---|---|---|---|---|---|---|
| Passenger lines | 9 539 | 2 442 | 2 088 | 2 667 | 2 811 | 1 012 | 438 | 297 | 21 294 |
| Cargo lines | 117 | 1 347 | 3 088 | 1 614 | 3 225 | 3 970 | 3 197 | 589 | 17 130 |
Notes : the length of passenger and freight closures is not cumulative. Freight closures are mostly on lines previously closed to passenger service, or in some cases on lines closed to both. The total of 17,000 kilometers therefore corresponds approximately to the closed network; the number of kilometers of lines reserved for goods traffic would be around 4,000 kilometers. Unlike the situation in the 1950s and 1970s, when the majority of passenger lines were also used by cargo trains, a large proportion of the lines in today's network, apart from a few major routes, are restricted to passenger services.

Already reduced from 42,000 kilometers in 1937 to around 28,000 kilometers in the 21st century, the national rail network could lose a further 9,000 kilometers of lines (i.e. almost a third of the remaining network) in the coming years. Indeed, this is what is recommended by the "Spinetta" report published on February 15, 2018. However, when presenting the reform of the public company, the Prime Minister guaranteed that the Spinetta report would not be followed on this point.

== Rail network ==
=== Overview ===
RFN's main passenger lines and international links

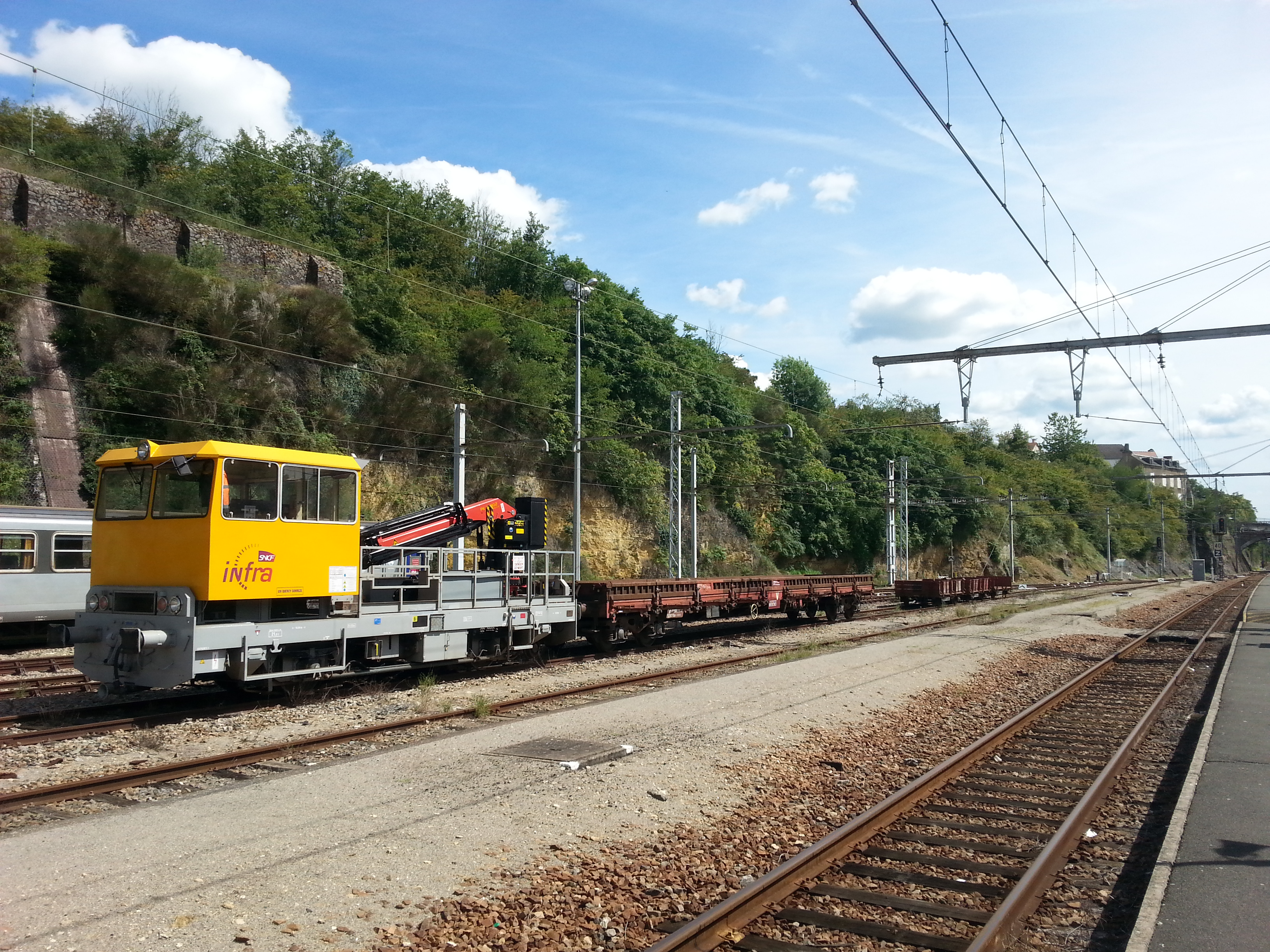
An SNCF draisine

The French State is the owner and SNCF Réseau the operator of rail lines and infrastructure in France, with the exception of:

- certain sections of the Île-de-France regional express network (RER) operated by the Régie autonome des transports parisiens (RATP), i.e. line A-except for the SNCF branches from Nanterre-Préfecture to Poissy and Cergy-le-Haut-and line B south of Gare du Nord;
- certain lines with passenger services still operated by local railroads: Chemins de fer de la Corse, the line from Nice to Digne;
- a few local lines only served by freight trains: in Bouches-du-Rhône (Pas-des-Lanciers-La Mède line), in Hérault (Colombiers-Cazouls-les-Béziers line), in Auvergne (Livradois-Forez line);
- certain concession lines: Channel Tunnel, LGV Perpignan-Figueras;
- the French section of the Luxembourg line from Bettembourg to Volmerange-les-Mines via Dudelange-Usines (linked only to the Luxembourg rail network);
- port rail networks (RFP);
- private industrial networks;
- several hundred private sidings (also known as branch terminals) serving shippers (factories, warehouses, etc.);
- most tourist railways and vélorails;
- overseas lines;
- tramway and metro lines, managed by the public transport authorities of each city or conurbation;
- disused passenger buildings, flagman posts, and signal boxes, sold to private individuals.

According to Danielle Brulebois, LREM MP and member of the board of the Établissement public de sécurité ferroviaire, the French rail network is suffering from "30 to 40 years of underinvestment".

=== Consistency ===
By the year 2022, the national rail network, owned by SNCF Réseau, includes around 28,000 km of lines in service, of which around 24,000 km are open to passenger service, with the remaining lines limited to freight service. It includes 2,700 km of high-speed lines, 1,576 tunnels for a total length of 656 km, 26,733 bridges and viaducts, 1,201 overhead walkways, 2,200 signal boxes, including 1,250 electric ones, and 15,000 level crossings.

The highest point on the SNCF-owned network is the Bolquère-Eyne station in the Pyrénées-Orientales region, at an altitude of 1,593 m: it is served by TER Occitanie trains on the Cerdagne line.

Some 15,000 trains run on the national rail network every day.

It is the second longest rail network in the European Union, behind the DB Netz network in Germany.

In 2013, 3,029 SNCF stations were open to passengers (including Monaco). By 2022, some 2,850 stations or stops will serve the passenger network.

Nearly 1,400 private branches are connected to the national rail network, and more than 300 stations have freight yards.

The network comprises 15,687 km of electrified lines, of which 5,863 km, mainly south of Paris, are direct current at 1,500 volts. The rest of the network uses alternating current at 25,000 volts.

Track gauge is 1,435 mm (standard track). However, three lines belonging to the national rail network are metre-gauge: the Chemin de fer du Blanc-Argent, the Saint-Gervais–Vallorcine railway (frontier) and the Cerdagne line.

Trains run on the left-hand side of the national rail network's double-track lines, except in the departments of Bas-Rhin, Haut-Rhin and Moselle, where they run on the right-hand side (with the exception of a few sections of line linking Alsace-Moselle to the rest of the national network, such as between Mulhouse and Territoire de Belfort, or on the LGV Est high-speed line). As these three departments were annexed by Germany in 1871, the standards in force on the German rail network were maintained after Alsace-Moselle was returned to France in November 1918.

French rail signalling uses several systems: on high-speed lines, it is on board, based on the TVM 300 and 430 systems. On other lines, signalling is by trackside light signals (absolute, automatic, BAPR). On a few lightly used lines, mechanical signalling is still used, or the single-track simplified signalling system (VUSS). Finally, some capillary freight lines are operated under a single track with a restricted traffic (VUTR) system. Speed is controlled by the KVB system. With the standardization of rail signalling in Europe, high-speed lines and certain major freight routes are also equipped with ERTMS signalling.

Some 15,000 km of lines are equipped with the Global System for Mobile Communications – Railway (GSM-R).

Corsica's railroads are owned by the Corsican local authority, not the State. Corsican lines do, however, have an official number, as they were operated by SNCF from 1983 to 2011. Other local lines operated by the SNCF have also been assigned numbers, such as the Chemin de fer de l'Est de Lyon line or the Colombiers to Cazouls-lès-Béziers line, although they do not belong to the national rail network.

Some lines carry an official number, but are no longer part of the national rail network; they may have been decommissioned, but are still operated for tourist traffic, or transferred to third parties (local authorities, chambers of commerce and industry, autonomous ports).

Finally, the military rail network comprises 2,000 km of track.

==== Delegated operations ====
Some lines, although part of the national rail network, are operated under a leasing contract. This is notably the case for the following lines:

- Guingamp to Paimpol;
- Guingamp to Carhaix.

=== Line classification ===
According to the classification of the International Union of Railways (UIC, French: Union internationale des chemins de fer), the lines of the national network are divided into nine categories, according to the importance of traffic. Today, the first six categories-the most important ones, covering high-speed lines, electrified main lines, and the Ile-de-France network, i.e. almost 90% of traffic-are regularly maintained and modernized. The last three, covering a total of 15,000 kilometers, are maintained when essential, and in the meantime are subject to more or less extensive speed restrictions. Regional services, which are more numerous and have greatly renewed rolling stock, are sometimes hampered by this state of affairs. It should not be forgotten, however, that RFF inherited a large part of SNCF's debt, which had a significant impact on its financing capacity.

=== Speed limits and performance ===
The network is divided into six speed limits. These speeds, which meet the various needs of rail transport, from local service to very high speed, are divided as follows:

1. 1-100 km/h
2. 101-120 km/h
3. 121-140 km/h
4. 141-160 km/h
5. 161-200 km/h
6. 201-350 km/h

=== Maps ===
The network's main passenger stations

The network's electrified lines

=== Economic liberalization ===
In rail transport, opening up to external competition-or liberalization-commonly refers to the possibility for different companies to offer their transport services to customers. In Europe, rail network management is recognized as a natural monopoly, and rail network facilities as an essential infrastructure to which rail companies must have access.

Without opening up the network to several transport companies, there could be no competition between them. The institutional separation of the railway infrastructure manager (French: RFF) from the original railway company (SNCF) was intended to reinforce equality between railway companies and make competition more effective.

Beyond the general aspects of opening up rail transport in France to competition, the opening up of the network is characterized by:

- the publication of a document de référence du réseau (network reference document), setting out in particular the terms of access to the network and the scale of charges for its use;
- the reception, processing, and response to requests for train paths from the various railway companies, according to a single, non-discriminatory process;
- informing railway companies about their operations (timetable changes, incidents, etc.);
- the development of services offered by RFF to railway companies, according to their specific needs. Various types of contracts have been signed between RFF and different customers (framework agreements, conventions, etc.).

== Definition and legal status ==
=== History ===
Law no. 97-135 of February 13, 1997, on the creation of the public establishment Réseau ferré de France with a view to the renewal of rail transport, specifies that "the consistency and main characteristics of this network are set by the State, under the conditions laid down in article 14 of law no. 82-1153 of December 30th, 1982 on the orientation of domestic transport". (LOTI).

The definition and scope of the national rail network were set out in Decrees 97-444 and 97-445 of May 5, 1997. Article 1 of decree no. 97-445 of May 5, 1997, concerning the initial assets of the public establishment Réseau ferré de France, specifies that "the assets transferred in full ownership to Réseau ferré de France, hereinafter referred to as RFF, in accordance with article 5 of the aforementioned law of February 13th, 1997, are divided into four categories, which are listed in the appendix to this decree". These four categories correspond respectively to track, telecommunications facilities, buildings and installations, and other assets.

=== Current regime ===
==== Code des transports ====
Article L.2111-1 of the French Transport Code states: "The composition and main characteristics of the national rail network are laid down by regulation (...). The SNCF Réseau company is responsible for the lines of the national rail network, which are the property of the State". Railroad lines are part of the State's real estate public domain.

==== Decree 97-444 ====
Article 2 of "Decree no. 97-444 of May 5th, 1997 concerning the missions of SNCF Réseau" states that "the composition of the national rail network is set by decree. (...) The list of lines on the national rail network is kept up to date by Réseau ferré de France (now SNCF Réseau). The lines or sections of lines to which railway companies have access are specified in the national rail network reference document provided for in article 17 of decree no. 2003-194 of March 7th, 2003, as amended, on the use of the national rail network."

==== Decree 2002-1359 ====
The RFN was defined in "Decree 2002-1359 of November 13th, 2002 stipulating the composition of the national rail network". According to art. 1 of the decree, it includes:

- lines conceded by the State to SNCF before December 31, 1982, and not removed from the RFN;
- lines for which a DUP has been issued since January 1, 1983, and which are operated by SNCF or RFF;
- lines incorporated into the RFN and not removed from it;
- lines known as "main branch lines".

Article 2 of this text specifies that "the list of lines or sections of lines making up the national rail network is appended to the decree provided for in the third paragraph of article 2 of the aforementioned decree of May 5th, 1997" (decree 97-444).

==== Decree 2003-194 ====
Decree no. 2003-194 of March 7, 2003 relatif à l'utilisation du réseau ferré national, introduced the concept of a national rail network reference document, which contains all the information required to exercise access rights to the national rail network. It was drawn up by Réseau ferré de France (now SNCF Réseau).

The reference document includes, in particular, a presentation of the structure and characteristics of the infrastructure.

==== Ministerial decrees ====
Several ministerial decrees have been issued in succession to define the basic sections of the national rail network and the list of stations for which station-stop reservation fees are payable, most recently on December 4, 2006. To consult the annexed list, readers are referred to the Ministry of Ecological Transition website, which in turn refers to the network reference document on the SNCF Réseau website.

== Line statuses ==
=== Open for traffic ===
A line is open (in whole or in part) when it gives rise to a user charge for rail traffic. The list is updated in the network reference document. It can be used by both passenger and freight trains. Some lines are used solely for passenger traffic, while others are used solely for freight.

=== Neutralized ===
A line is neutralized (in whole or in part) when its access is blocked by physical means (crossbeams, bolts blocking the access needle), but can be reopened after technical safeguards have been taken.

=== Closed ===
A line is closed (in whole or in part) when the Board of Directors of SNCF Réseau has decided to close it, after having submitted its project to the Regional Council responsible for organizing regional passenger rail transport (in accordance with article 22 of decree no. 97-444), and for which the Minister of Transport has expressed no opposition. The line may be closed and the track kept in place, either for national defense purposes, or to make it available to a third party (cyclo-draisine, tourist railway, community), or at the request of the Minister for subsequent use.

=== Cut-off ===
A line is cut off (in whole or in part) when the Board of Directors of Réseau ferré de France has decided to do so. Introduced when RFF was created in 1997, line cutting no longer exists since the publication of decree no. 2006-1517 of December 4, 2006. During this period, the cutting off of a line meant its removal from the national rail network.

While the possibility of line cutting no longer exists, lines cut between 1997 and 2006 without any subsequent change in status are still covered by this status.

=== Decommissioned ===
A line is decommissioned (in whole or in part) when SNCF Réseau has decided to decommission it, following authorization to close the line without maintaining it. SNCF Réseau may decommission a line:

- unilaterally within five years of the closure authorization (article 4 of decree no. 2019–1516 on the rules governing the management of public property applicable to SNCF Réseau);
- after authorization by the Minister of Transport beyond five years following authorization of closure (article 3 of decree n°2019-1516).

When a line is decommissioned, it passes from the public domain to the private domain (in any case, it is no longer part of the national rail network). Once the line has been decommissioned, SNCF Réseau can sell the land.

Some decommissioned lines can still be operated (tourist trains or even regular freight or passenger services).

=== In planning ===
A planned non-concessioned line is assigned a line number at the latest when the declaration of public utility is pronounced, in order to identify and reference all documents.

=== Filed ===
This is not a status of the line, but a state of the line, referring to the presence or absence of the track. A line can be deposited when it is closed or decommissioned.

== Non-exhaustive list of lines ==
=== Eastern Region ===
Legend: (1) Line in operation; (2) Line neutralized; (3) Line closed; (4) Line decommissioned; (5) Line cut-off; (6) Line filed; (7) Line in planning (situation as of July 24, 2019).

| N° | Railway Name | (1) | (2) | (3) | (4) | (5) | (6) | (7) | Observations |
|---|---|---|---|---|---|---|---|---|---|
| 001 000 | Paris-Est–Mulhouse-Ville | X | | | | | | | |
| 001 391 | Raccordement court de Mulhouse | X | | | | | | | |
| 002 000 | Gretz-Armainvilliers to Sézanne | | | | | | | | |
| 002 000 | from Gretz-Armainvilliers to Coulommiers (PK 72,142) | X | | | | | | | |
| 002 000 | from Coulommiers to La Ferté-Gaucher (PK 91,160) | | X | | | | | | |
| 002 000 | from Ferté-Gaucher to Meilleray (PK 102,508) | | | | X | | | | |
| 002 000 | from Meilleray to Esternay (PK 115,470) | | | | | X | | | |
| 002 000 | from Esternay to Sézanne | X | | | | | | | |
| 003 000 | Longueville to Esternay | | | | | | | | |
| 003 000 | from Longueville to Villiers-Saint-Georges (PK 111,676) | X | | | | | | | |
| 003 000 | from Villiers-Saint-Georges to Esternay | | | | X | | X | | |
| 004 000 | Mézy to Romilly-sur-Seine | | | | | | | | |
| 004 000 | from Mézy to Artonges (PK 17,135) | X | | | | | | | |
| 004 000 | from Artonges to Montmirail (PK 25,860) | | | X | | | | | |
| 004 000 | from Montmirail to Romilly-sur-Seine | | | | X | | X | | |
| 005 000 | LGV Est | X | | | | | | | |
| 006 000 | Coolus to Sens | | | | | | | | |
| 006 000 | from Coolus to Charmont (PK 75,226) | X | | | | | | | |
| 006 000 | from Charmont to Troyes (PK 88,680) | | X | | | | | | |
| 006 000 | from Troyes (PK 88,680 to 90,212) | | | | X | | X | | |
| 006 000 | from Troyes to Villeneuve-l'Archevêque (PK 131,700) | X | | | | | | | |
| 006 000 | from Villeneuve-l'Archevêque to Malay-le-Grand (PK 151,880) | | | X | | | | | |
| 006 000 | from Malay-le-Grand to Sens (PK 156,900) | | | | X | | X | | |
| 007 000 | Fère-Champenoise to Vitry-le-François | | | | | | | | |
| 007 000 | from Fère-Champenoise to Lenharrée (PK 9,000) | | | | | X | | | |
| 007 000 | from Lenharrée to Sompuis (PK 37,641) | | | | X | | X | | |
| 007 000 | from Sompuis to Vitry-le-François (PK 47,876) | | | | | X | | | |
| 010 000 | Oiry-Mareuil to Romilly-sur-Seine | | | | | | | | |
| 010 000 | from Oiry to Sézanne | X | | | | | | | |
| 010 000 | from Sézanne to Anglure (PK 72,660) | | X | | | | | | |
| 010 000 | from Anglure Romilly-sur-Seine | | | | X | | X | | |
| 012 000 | Troyes to Brienne-le-Château | X | | | | | | | |
| 013 000 | Vallentigny to Vitry-le-François | X | | | | | | | |
| 014 000 | LGV Rhin-Rhône (east branch, phase 1) | | | | | | | | |
| 014 000 | from Genlis to Villers-les-Pots | | | | | | | X | |
| 014 000 | from Villers-les-Pots to Petit-Croix | X | | | | | | | |
| 014 000 | from Petit-Croix to Lutterbach | | | | | | | X | Completion by 2028? |
| 015 000 | Jessains to Sorcy | | | | | | | | |
| 015 000 | from Jessains to Dienville | | | | X | | X | | For SNCF Réseau, the section is still officially in operation. |
| 015 000 | from Dienville to Brienne-le-Château | | X | | | | | | |
| 015 000 | from Brienne-le-Château to Vallentigny-Maizières (PK 229,818) | X | | | | | | | |
| 015 000 | from Vallentigny-Maizières to Sorcy | | | | X | | X | | |
| 016 000 | Montier-en-Der to Éclaron | | | | X | | X | | |
| 018 000 | Saint-Dizier to Doulevant-le-Château | | | | X | | X | | From 1994 to 2011, operated by the Syndicat Mixte des Chemins de Fer de Blaise-et-Der. |
| 019 000 | Revigny to Saint-Dizier | | | | | | | | |
| 019 000 | from Revigny to PK 3,930 | X | | | | | | | To serve the I.T.E. ArcelorMittal plant. |
| 019 000 | from PK 3,930 to Saint-Dizier | | | | X | | X | | |
| 020 000 | Blesme-Haussignémont to Chaumont | X | | | | | | | |
| 026 000 | Bologne to Pagny-sur-Meuse | | | | | | | | |
| 026 000 | from Bologne to Neufchâteau (PK 46,500) | | X | | | | | | |
| 026 000 | from Neufchâteau to Coussey (PK 56,200) | | | X | | | | | |
| 026 000 | from Coussey to Saint-Germain-sur-Meuse (PK 88,235) | | | | X | | X | | |
| 026 000 | from Saint-Germain-sur-Meuse to Pagny-sur-Meuse | X | | | | | | | |
| 027 000 | Nançois-Tronville to Neufchâteau | | | | | | | | |
| 027 000 | from Nançois-Tronville to Velaines (PK 3,400) | X | | | | | | | |
| 027 000 | from Velaines to Gondrecourt-le-Château (PK 35,885) | | X | | | | | | |
| 027 000 | from Gondrecourt-le-Château to Neufchâteau | | | | X | | ? | | |
| 027 000 | on the outskirts of Neufchâteau | | | X | | | | | |
| 030 000 | Neufchâteau to Épinal | | | | | | | | |
| 030 000 | from Neufchâteau to Gironcourt-Houécourt (PK 77,350) | X | | | | | | | |
| 030 000 | from Gironcourt-Houécourt to Mirecourt (PK 93,528) | | | | X | | X | | |
| 030 000 | from Mirecourt to Hymont-Mattaincourt (PK 98,373) | X | | | | | | | |
| 030 000 | from Hymont-Mattaincourt to Épinal | | | | X | | X | | |
| 032 000 | Culmont-Chalindrey to Toul | X | | | | | | | |
| 033 000 | Langres to Andilly-en-Bassigny | | X | | | | | | |
| 035 000 | Merrey to Hymont-Mattaincourt | X | | | | | | | |
| 039 000 | Toul to Rosières-aux-Salines | | | | | | | | |
| 039 000 | from Toul to Neuves-Maisons (PK 23,115) | | X | | | | | | |
| 039 000 | from Neuves-Maisons to Rosières-aux-Salines | X | | | | | | | |
| 040 000 | Jarville-la-Malgrange to Mirecourt | | | | | | | | |
| 040 000 | from Jarville-la-Malgrange to Xeuilley (PK 19,500) | X | | | | | | | |
| 040 000 | from Xeuilley to Mirecourt | | X | | | | | | |
| 041 000 | Barisey-la-Côte to Frenelle-la-Grande-Puzieux | | | | | | | | |
| 041 000 | from Barisey to PK 2,906 | | X | | | | | | For service to the I.T.E. at Nancy-Ochey air base. |
| 041 000 | from PK 2,906 to Frenelle-la-Grande-Puzieux | | | | X | | X | | |
| 042 000 | Blainville-Damelevières to Lure | X | | | | | | | |
| 050 000 | Vitrey-Vernois to Bourbonne-les-Bains | | | | X | | X | | |
| 051 000 | Jussey to Darnieulles-Uxegney | | | | X | | X | | |
| 053 000 | Aillevillers to Plombières-les-Bains | | | | X | | X | | |
| 054 000 | Corbenay to Faymont | | | | | | | | |
| 054 000 | from Corbenay to Fougerolles (PK 103,200) | | | X | | | | | |
| 054 000 | from Fougerolles to Faymont | | | | X | | X | | |
| 055 000 | Bas-Évette to Giromagny | X | | | | | | | |
| 057 000 | Aillevillers to Port-d'Atelier-Amance | | | | | | | | |
| 057 000 | from Aillevillers to Port-fromAtelier-Amance (PK 123,550) | | | | | X | X | | |
| 057 000 | on the outskirts of Port-fromAtelier-Amance | | | X | | | X | | |
| 060 000 | Épinal to Bussang | | | | | | | | |
| 060 000 | from Épinal to Remiremont (PK 28,050) | X | | | | | | | |
| 060 000 | from Remiremont to Bussang | | | | X | | X | | route verte of Hautes-Vosges. |
| 061 000 | Remiremont to Cornimont | | | | X | | X | | route verte of Hautes-Vosges. |
| 062 000 | Arches to Saint-Dié | | X | | | | | | |
| 063 000 | Laveline-devant-Bruyères to Gérardmer | | | | | | | | |
| 063 000 | from Laveline-devant-Bruyères to Gérardmer (PK 16,700) | | | X | | | | | |
| 063 000 | inside Gérardmer (from PK 16,700 to 17,999) | | | X | | | X | | |
| 064 000 | Saint-Léonard to Fraize | | | | X | | X | | |
| 065 000 | Mont-sur-Meurthe to Bruyères | | | | | | | | |
| 065 000 | from Mont-sur-Meurthe to Rambervilliers (PK 34,000) | | | | X | | | | |
| 065 000 | from Rambervilliers to Bruyères | | | X | | | | | |
| 067 000 | Lunéville to Saint-Dié | X | | | | | | | |
| 068 000 | Baccarat to Badonviller | | | | X | | X | | |
| 069 000 | Igney-Avricourt to Cirey | | | X | | | | | |
| 070 000 | Noisy-le-Sec to Strasbourg-Ville | X | | | | | | | |
| 070 346 | Connection of Strasbourg-Cronenbourg (route S) | X | | | | | | | |
| 071 000 | Esbly to Crécy-la-Chapelle | X | | | | | | | |
| 072 000 | Trilport to Bazoches | X | | | | | | | |
| 073 000 | Château-Thierry to Oulchy-Breny | | | | X | | X | | |
| 074 000 | Épernay to Reims | X | | | | | | | |
| 076 000 | Aulnay-sous-Bois to Roissy 2-RER | X | | | | | | | |
| 078 000 | Champigneulles to Houdemont | | | | | | | | |
| 078 000 | from Champigneulles to PK 348,650 | | X | | | | | | |
| 078 000 | from PK 348,650 to Nancy-Saint-Georges (PK 352,435) | | | X | | | X | | |
| 078 000 | inside Nancy-Saint-Georges (PK 352,435 to 353,734) | | | | | X | X | | |
| 078 000 | from Nancy-Saint-Georges to Jarville-la-Malgrange (PK 355,459) | | | | X | | | | |
| 078 000 | from Jarville-la-Malgrange to Houdemont | | | | | | | | |
| 081 000 | Châlons-en-Champagne to Reims-Cérès | X | | | | | | | |
| 082 000 | Reims to Laon | X | | | | | | | |
| 085 000 | Saint-Hilaire-au-Temple to Hagondange | | | | | | | | |
| 085 000 | from Saint-Hilaire-au-Temple to Islettes (PK 238,350) | X | | | | | | | |
| 085 000 | from Islettes to Baleycourt (PK 268,350) | | X | | | | | | |
| 085 000 | from Baleycourt to Hagondange | X | | | | | | | |
| 086 000 | Conflans-Jarny to Metz-Ville | | | | | | | | |
| 086 000 | from Conflans-Jarny to Batilly (PK 326,000) | X | | | | | | | |
| 086 000 | from Batilly to Longeville-lès-Metz (PK 341,474) | | | | X | | | | |
| 086 000 | from Longeville-lès-Metz to Metz | | X | | | | | | |
| 088 000 | Lérouville to Pont-Maugis | | | | | | | | |
| 088 000 | from Lérouville (PK 2,000) to Dugny (PK 45,140) | | | X | | | | | |
| 088 000 | from Dugny to Verdun (PK 54,950) | X | | | | | | | |
| 088 000 | from Verdun to Mouzon (PK 131,150) | | | X | | | | | |
| 088 000 | from Mouzon to Pont-Maugis | X | | | | | | | |
| 089 000 | Lérouville to Metz-Ville | X | | | | | | | |
| 090 000 | Frouard to Novéant | X | | | | | | | |
| 091 000 | Dieulouard to Rémilly | | | | | | | | Line never built. |
| 095 000 | Longuyon to Onville and Pagny-sur-Moselle | X | | | | | | | |
| 096 000 | Pompey to Nomeny | | | | | | | | |
| 096 000 | from Pompey to Leyr (PK 12,332) | | | | X | | X | | |
| 096 000 | from Leyr to Nomeny | | | X | | | X | | |
| 097 000 | Champigneulles to Sarralbe | | | | | | | | |
| 097 000 | from Champigneulles to Eulmont-Agincourt (PK 6,355) | | | | | X | X | | |
| 097 000 | from Eulmont-Agincourt to Bénéstroff (PK 54,900) | | | | X | | X | | |
| 097 000 | inside Bénestroff (PK 54,900 to 56,670) | X | | | | | | | |
| 097 000 | from Bénestroff to Rech (PK 78,700) | | | | X | | X | | |
| 097 000 | from Rech to Sarralbe | X | | | | | | | |
| 098 000 | Burthécourt to Vic-sur-Seille | | | | X | | X | | |
| 099 000 | Metz-Ville to Château-Salins | | | | | | | | |
| 099 000 | inside Metz (PK 2,300 to 6,200) | | X | | | | | | |
| 099 000 | from Metz to Pommérieux (PK 18,780) | | | | X | | | | |
| 099 000 | from Pommérieux to Secourt-Solgne (PK 29,000) | | | X | | | | | |
| 099 000 | from Secourt-Solgne to Château-Salins | | | | X | | | | |
| 100 000 | Nouvel-Avricourt to Bénestroff | | | | | | | | |
| 100 000 | from Nouvel-Avricourt to Dieuze (PK 20,700) | | | | X | | X | | |
| 100 000 | from Dieuze to Bénestroff | | | X | | | | | |
| 106 000 | Sarrebourg to Abreschviller | | | | X | | X | | |
| 107 000 | La Forge to Vallérysthal-Troisfontaines | | | | X | | X | | |
| 110 000 | Strasbourg-Ville to Saint-Dié | X | | | | | | | |
| 110 306 | Connection from Strasbourg to Koenigshoffen-Nord | X | | | | | | | |
| 110 311 | Connection from Strasbourg to Koenigshoffen-Sud | X | | | | | | | |
| 111 000 | Sélestat to Saverne | | | | | | | | |
| 111 000 | from Sélestat to Molsheim (PK 33,261) | X | | | | | | | |
| 111 000 | from Molsheim to Saverne (PK 63,900) | | | | X | | | | |
| 111 064 | Connection of Saverne | | | | X | | X | | |
| 114 300 | Connection of Sarrebourg to Sarraltroff | X | | | | | | | |
| 115 000 | Strasbourg-Ville to Saint-Louis | X | | | | | | | |
| 115 306 | Connection from Mulhouse-Dornach to Mulhouse-Nord | X | | | | | | | |
| 116 000 | Sélestat to Lesseux-Frapelle | | | | | | | | |
| 116 000 | from Sélestat to Bois-l'Abbesse (PK 10,480) | X | | | | | | | |
| 116 000 | from Bois-l'Abbesse to Lesseux-Frapelle | | | | X | | X | | |
| 117 000 | Val-de-Villé to Villé | | | | X | | X | | |
| 118 000 | Sélestat to Sundhouse | | | | X | | X | | |
| 119 000 | Colmar-Central to Metzeral | X | | | | | | | |
| 120 000 | Colmar-Central to Neuf-Brisach | X | | | | | | | |
| 121 000 | Colmar-Sud to Bollwiller | | | | | | | | |
| 121 000 | from Colmar-Sud to Ensisheim (PK 26,940) | | X | | | | | | |
| 121 000 | from Ensisheim to Bollwiller | | | | X | | | | |
| 122 000 | Bollwiller to Lautenbach | | | | | | | | |
| 122 000 | from Bollwiller to Heissenstein (PK 9,450) | | X | | | | | | |
| 122 000 | from Heissenstein to Lautenbach | | | | X | | | | |
| 123 000 | Neuf-Brisach to Bantzenheim | | | | | | | | |
| 123 000 | from Neuf-Brisach to Blodelsheim (PK 16,450) | | X | | | | | | |
| 123 000 | from Blodelsheim to Bantzenheim | X | | | | | | | |
| 124 000 | Mulhouse-Ville to Chalampé | X | | | | | | | |
| 124 606 | Mulhouse-Ville main line | | | | X | | | | |
| 125 000 | Connection of the bifurcation of Wanne to Mulhouse-Ville | X | | | | | | | |
| 125 005 | Mulhouse-Nord to Mulhouse-Port-du-Canal railway | | | | X | | | | |
| 125 306 | Connection of the Wanne bifurcation to Mulhouse-Ville | X | | | | | | | |
| 128 000 | Saint-Maurice to Wesserling | | | | X | | X | | Unfinished line. |
| 129 000 | Colmar-Central to Marckolsheim | | | | X | | | | |
| 130 000 | Lutterbach to Kruth | X | | | | | | | |
| 131 000 | Cernay to Sewen | | | | X | | | | |
| 132 000 | Lutterbach to Rond-point Stricker | X | | | | | | | |
| 133 000 | Dannemarie to Pfetterhouse | | | | X | | X | | |
| 134 000 | Altkirch to Ferrette | | | | | | | | |
| 134 000 | from Altkirch to PK 2,280 | | X | | | | | | |
| 134 000 | from PK 2,280 to Ferrette | | | | X | | X | | |
| 135 000 | Waldighoffen to Saint-Louis-La Chaussée | | | X | | | | | |
| 136 000 | Saint-Louis to Huningue | X | | | | | | | |
| 137 000 | Logelbach to Lapoutroie | | | | X | | X | | |
| 138 000 | Graffenstaden to Hausbergen | X | | | | | | | |
| 139 300 | Connection of Strasbourg-Cronenbourg (route 1C) | X | | | | | | | |
| 139 301 | Connection of Strasbourg-Cronenbourg (route H) | X | | | | | | | |
| 139 302 | Connection of Strasbourg-Cronenbourg (route K) | X | | | | | | | |
| 140 000 | Réding to Metz-Ville | X | | | | | | | |
| 141 000 | Graffenstaden to Strasbourg-Neudorf | X | | | | | | | |
| 141 306 | Connection from Strasbourg-Neudorf to Strasbourg-Koenigshoffen | X | | | | | | | |
| 142 000 | Strasbourg-Ville to Strasbourg-Port-du-Rhin | X | | | | | | | |
| 143 000 | Independent Port of Strasbourg railway | X | | | | | | | Serves the southern sector of the Autonomous Port of Strasbourg from Strasbourg-Neudorf. |
| 145 000 | Strasbourg to Lauterbourg | X | | | | | | | |
| 145 002 | Schiltigheim bypass | X | | | | | | | |
| 145 306 | Bischheim's connection | X | | | | | | | |
| 146 000 | Vendenheim to Wissembourg | X | | | | | | | |
| 150 000 | Haguenau to Rœschwoogandfrontier | | | | | | | | |
| 150 000 | from Haguenau to PK 8,600 | X | | | | | | | To serve the Oberhoffen military camp. |
| 150 000 | from PK 8,600 to Rœschwoog (PK 21,511) | | X | | | | | | |
| 150 000 | inside Rœschwoog (PK 21,511 to 26,164) | X | | | | | | | |
| 150 000 | from Rœschwoog to Beinheim (PK 28,530) | | X | | | | | | |
| 150 000 | from Beinheim to la frontier | | | | | X | | | |
| 151 000 | Lauterbourg-Gare to Lauterbourg-Port-du-Rhin | X | | | | | | | |
| 152 000 | Wissembourg to Lauterbourg-Gare | | | | X | | X | | |
| 153 000 | Mertzwiller to Seltz | | | | X | | X | | |
| 154 000 | Walbourg to Lembach | | | | X | | X | | |
| 157 000 | Lutzelbourg to Drulingen (1 m) | | | | X | | X | | |
| 158 000 | Maisons-Rouges to Phalsbourg (1 m) | | | | X | | X | | |
| 159 000 | Haguenau to Hargarten-Falck | | | | | | | | |
| 159 000 | from Haguenau to Niederbronn-les-Bains (PK 21,558) | X | | | | | | | |
| 159 000 | from Niederbronn-les-Bains to Sarreguemines (PK 83,200) | | X | | | | | | |
| 159 000 | from Sarreguemines to Hargarten-Falck | X | | | | | | | |
| 160 000 | Steinbourg to Schweighouse-sur-Moder | | | | | | | | |
| 160 000 | from Steinbourg to Obermodern (PK 18,427) | | | | X | | X | | |
| 160 000 | inside Obermodern (PK 18,427 to 19,500) | X | | | | | | | |
| 160 000 | from Obermodern to Schweighouse-sur-Moder | | X | | | | | | |
| 161 000 | Mommenheim to Sarreguemines | X | | | | | | | |
| 162 000 | Bouxwiller to Ingwiller | | | | X | | X | | |
| 163 000 | Sarreguemines towards Sarrebruck | X | | | | | | | |
| 164 000 | Ingwiller to La Petite-Pierre (1 m) | | | | | | | | Line never built. |
| 166 000 | Wingen-sur-Moder to Saint-Louis-lès-Bitcheandfrontier | | | | X | | X | | |
| 167 000 | Réding to Diemeringen | | | | | | | | |
| 167 000 | from Réding to PK 7,000 | X | | | | | | | |
| 167 000 | from PK 7,000 to Drulingen (PK 19,165) | | X | | | | | | |
| 167 000 | inside Drulingen (PK 19,165 to 19,990) | | | X | | | | | |
| 167 000 | from Drulingen to Diemeringen | | | | X | | X | | |
| 168 000 | Berthelming to Sarreguemines | | | | | | | | |
| 168 000 | from Berthelming to Sarre-Union (PK 17,870) | | | X | | | | | |
| 168 000 | from Sarre-Union to Sarralbe (PK 26,150) | | X | | | | | | |
| 168 000 | inside Sarralbe (PK 26,150 to 28,129) | X | | | | | | | |
| 168 000 | from Sarralbe to Hambach (PK 33,440) | | | X | | | | | |
| 168 000 | from Hambach to Sarreguemines | | | | X | | X | | |
| 169 000 | Kalhausen to Sarralbe | X | | | | | | | |
| 170 000 | Sarreguemines to Bliesbruck | | X | | | | X | | |
| 172 000 | Rémilly to Stiring-Wendel | X | | | | | | | |
| 173 000 | Courcelles-sur-Nied to Téterchen | | | | X | | X | | |
| 174 000 | Metz-Ville to the German border to Überherrn | | | | | | | | |
| 174 000 | from Metz-Ville to Bettelainville | | | | X | | | | From Vigy to Bettelainville, a section of line operated by CFTVC. |
| 174 000 | from Bettelainville to Anzeling (PK 29,620) | | | | X | | | | |
| 174 000 | from Anzeling to Hargarten-Falck (PK 50,752) | X | | | | | | | |
| 174 000 | from Hargarten-Falck to the German border to Überherrn | | | X | | | | | |
| 175 000 | Bettelainville to Waldwisse | | | | | | | | |
| 175 000 | from Bettelainville to Hombourg-Budange (PK 7,230) | | | | X | | | | Line operated by CFTVC. |
| 175 000 | from Hombourg-Budange to Waldwisse | | | | X | | X | | |
| 176 000 | Bouzonville to Guerstling (frontier) | X | | | | | | | |
| 177 000 | Thionville to Anzeling | X | | | | | | | |
| 178 000 | Thionville to Apach (frontier) | X | | | | | | | |
| 180 000 | Metz-Ville to Zoufftgen | X | | | | | | | |
| 186 000 | Bettembourg (Luxembourg) to Audun-le-Tiche | X | | | | | | | Line operated by CFL. |
| 190 000 | Hettange-Grande to Entrange | | | | X | | X | | |
| 191 300 | Connection of Metz-Ville to Metz-Marchandises | X | | | | | | | |
| 192 000 | Metz-Sablon to Woippy (Ceinture de Metz) | X | | | | | | | |
| 194 000 | Knutange-Nilvange to Algrange-Rochonvillers | | | | X | | X | | |
| 195 000 | Fontoy to Audun-le-Tiche | | | | | | | | |
| 195 000 | de Fontoy to PK 18,750 | | | | | X | | | |
| 195 000 | from PK 18,750 to Audun-le-Tiche | | | | X | | X | | |
| 196 000 | Audun-le-Tiche to Hussigny-Godbrange | | | | X | | X | | |
| 196 300 | Connection of Audun-le-Tiche | | | | X | | X | | |
| 197 000 | Boulange to Rumelange-Ottange | | | | X | | X | | |
| 200 000 | Vireux-Molhain to the Belgian border towards Mariembourg | | | | X | | X | | |
| 201 000 | Montmédy to Écouviez | | | | X | | X | | |
| 202 000 | Longuyon to Mont-Saint-Martin (towards Athus) | X | | | | | | | |
| 202 100 | Longuyon to Mont-Saint-Martin (towards Luxembourg) | X | | | | | | | |
| 203 000 | Longwy to Villerupt-Micheville | | | | X | | X | | |
| 204 000 | Mohon to Thionville | X | | | | | | | |
| 205 000 | Soissons to Givet | | | | | | | | |
| 205 000 | from Soissons to PK 6,100 | X | | | | | | | |
| 205 000 | from PK 6,100 to Ciry-Sermoise (PK 11,500) | | | X | | | | | |
| 205 000 | from Ciry-Sermoise to Braine (PK 16,953) | | | | X | | | | |
| 205 000 | from Braine to Givet (PK 207,235) | X | | | | | | | |
| 205 000 | from Givet to la frontier belge | | X | | | | | | |
| 207 000 | Bazancourt to Challerange | | | X | | | | | |
| 208 000 | Challerange to Apremont-sur-Aire | | | | | | | | |
| 208 000 | from Challerange to PK 51,650 | | X | | | | | | |
| 208 000 | from PK 51,650 to Apremont-sur-Aire | | | | X | | X | | |
| 209 000 | Givet to Belgian border towards Morialmé | | | | | X | | | |
| 210 000 | Amagne-Lucquy to Revigny | | | | | | | | |
| 210 000 | from Amagne-Lucquy to Challerange (PK 41,780) | X | | | | | | | |
| 210 000 | from Challerange to Sainte-Menehould (PK 71,880) | | | | X | | X | | |
| 210 000 | inside Sainte-Menehould (PK 71,880 to 74,300) | | | X | | | | | |
| 210 000 | from Sainte-Menehould to Revigny (PK 106,762) | | | | X | | X | | |
| 210 000 | fromkm 106,762 to Revigny | X | | | | | | | |
| 212 000 | Hirson to Amagne-Lucquy | | | | | | | | |
| 212 000 | from Hirson to Liart (PK 27,640) | X | | | | | | | |
| 212 000 | from Liart to Novien-Porcion (PK 52,262) | | | | X | | X | | |
| 212 000 | from Novien-Porcion to Amagne-Lucquy | | | X | | | | | |
| 213 000 | Marcq-Saint-Juvin to Baroncourt | | | | X | | X | | |
| 214 000 | Carignan to Messempré | | | | X | | X | | |
| 215 000 | Vrigne-Meuse to Vrigne-aux-Bois | | | X | | | X | | |
| 216 000 | Fretin to Fréthun (LGV) | X | | | | | | | |
| 218 000 | Baroncourt to Audun-le-Roman | | X | | | | | | |
| 219 000 | Audun-le-Tiche to Audun-le-Tiche-Villerupt | | | | X | | X | | |
| 220 000 | Valleroy-Moineville to Villerupt-Micheville | | | | | | | | |
| 220 000 | from Valleroy-Moineville to Tucquenieux (PK 339,880) | | | | X | | X | | |
| 220 000 | from Tucquenieux to Villerupt-Micheville | | | X | | | X | | |
| 221 000 | Tournes to Auvillers | | | | X | | X | | |
| 222 000 | Liart to Tournes | X | | | | | | | |
| 223 000 | Charleville-Mézières to Hirson (par Auvillers) | | | | | | | | |
| 223 000 | from Charleville-Mézières to Tournes | X | | | | | | | |
| 223 000 | from Tournes to Hirson | | | | X | | X | | |
| 224 000 | Monthermé-Château-Regnault-Bogny to Phade | X | | | | | | | |
| 225 000 | Remilly-Aillicourt to Raucourt | | | | X | | X | | |

=== Northern Region ===
Legend: (1) Line in operation; (2) Line neutralized; (3) Line closed; (4) Line decommissioned; (5) Line cut-off; (6) Line filed; (7) Line in planning (situation as of July 24, 2019).

| N° | Railway Name | (1) | (2) | (3) | (4) | (5) | (6) | (7) | Observations |
|---|---|---|---|---|---|---|---|---|---|
| 226 000 | Gonesse to Lille-frontier (LGV) | X | | | | | | | |
| 226 310 | LGV Interconnexion Est | X | | | | | | | |
| 227 000 | Ormoy-Villers to Mareuil-sur-Ourcq | | | | | | | | |
| 227 000 | from Ormoy-Villers to Antilly (PK 70,165) | | | | | X | | | |
| 227 000 | from Antilly to Mareuil-sur-Ourcq | | | | X | | X | | |
| 228 000 | Laon to Liart | | | | | | | | |
| 228 000 | from Laon to Montcornet (PK 174,150) | X | | | | | | | |
| 228 000 | from Montcornet to Liart (PK 196,160) | | | | X | | X | | |
| 229 000 | La Plaine to Hirson and Anor (frontier) | | | | | | | | |
| 229 000 | from La Plaine to Anor | X | | | | | | | |
| 229 000 | from Anor to la frontier belge | | | | X | | | | |
| 230 000 | Aulnay-sous-Bois to Verberie | | | | X | | X | | Unfinished line. |
| 231 000 | Chantilly-Gouvieux to Crépy-en-Valois | | | | X | | X | | |
| 232 000 | Ormoy-Villers to Boves | | | | | | | | |
| 232 000 | from Ormoy-Villers to Longueil-Sainte-Marie (PK 76,189) | X | | | | | | | |
| 232 000 | from Longueil-Sainte-Marie to Estrées-Saint-Denis (PK 90,000) | | | | X | | | | |
| 232 000 | fromEstrées-Saint-Denis to Boves | X | | | | | | | |
| 233 000 | Rethondes to La Ferté-Milon | | | | | | | | |
| 233 000 | from Rethondes to Villers-Cotterêts (PK 98,200) | | | | X | | X | | |
| 233 000 | inside Villers-Cotterêts (PK 98,200 to 101,750) | | | X | | | | | |
| 233 000 | from Villers-Cotterêts to La Ferté-Milon | | | | X | | X | | |
| 234 000 | Anizy-Pinon to Chauny | | | | X | | X | | |
| 236 000 | Laon to Cateau | | | | | | | | |
| 236 000 | from Laon to Sains-Richaumont (PK 177,940) | | | X | | | | | |
| 236 000 | from Sains-Richaumont to Guise (PK 188,865) | | | | X | | | | |
| 236 000 | from Guise to Wassigny (PK 206,330) | | | | | X | | | |
| 236 000 | from Wassigny to Cateau | | | | X | | | | |
| 237 000 | Flavigny-le-Grand to Ohis-Neuve-Maison | | | | X | | X | | |
| 238 000 | Busigny to Hirson | | | | X | | X | | |
| 239 000 | Avesnes to Sars-Poteries | | | | | | | | |
| 239 000 | from Avesnes to Camp de César (PK 95,530) | | | X | | | | | |
| 239 000 | from Camp de César to Sars-Poteries | | | | X | | | | |
| 240 000 | Maubeuge to Fourmies | | | | | | | | |
| 240 000 | from Maubeuge to Ferrière-la-Grande (PK 90,020) | X | | | | | | | |
| 240 000 | from Ferrière-la-Grande to Trélon-Glageon (PK 120,870) | | | | X | | X | | |
| 240 000 | from Trélon-Glageon to Fourmies | X | | | | | | | |
| 241 000 | Ferrière-la-Grande to Cousolre | X | | | | | | | |
| 242 000 | Creil to Jeumont | X | | | | | | | |
| 242 610 | Main line of Chauny-Saint-Gobain | | X | | | | | | |
| 242 626 | Main line of Saint-Quentin (Origny-Sainte-Benoîte) | X | | | | | | | |
| 247 000 | Hautmont to Feignies (frontier) | X | | | | | | | |
| 248 000 | Compiègne to Roye-Faubourg-Saint-Gilles | | | | | | | | |
| 248 000 | from Compiègne to Bienville (PK 86,300) | X | | | | | | | |
| 248 000 | from Bienville to Roye-sur-Matz (PK 106,835) | | | X | | | | | |
| 248 000 | from Roye-sur-Matz to Roye-Faubourg-Saint-Gilles (PK 116,000) | | | | X | | X | | |
| 248 000 | inside Roye-Faubourg-Saint-Gilles (PK 116,000 to 117,540) | | | X | | | X | | |
| 249 000 | Marcoing to Masnières | | | | X | | X | | |
| 250 000 | Busigny to Somain | X | | | | | | | |
| 251 000 | Escaudœuvres to Gussignies | | | | | | | | |
| 251 000 | from Escaudœuvres to Quesnoy (PK 241,834) | | | | X | | | | |
| 251 000 | from Quesnoy to Bavay (PK 255,000) | | | | X | | | | |
| 251 000 | from Bavay to Bettrechies-Bellignies (PK 260,654) | | | X | | | | | |
| 251 000 | from Bettrechies-Bellignies to Gussignies | | | | X | | X | | |
| 252 000 | Prouvy-Thiant au Cateau | | | | X | | X | | |
| 253 000 | Valenciennes-Faubourg-de-Paris to Hautmont | | | | | | | | |
| 253 000 | from Valenciennes-Faubourg-de-Paris to Bavay (PK 68,697) | | | | X | | | | |
| 253 000 | from Bavay to PK 80,025 | | | X | | | | | |
| 253 000 | from PK 80,025 to Hautmont | X | | | | | | | |
| 254 000 | Lourches to Valenciennes | X | | | | | | | |
| 255 000 | Saint-Amand-les-Eaux to Blanc-Misseron | | | | | | | | |
| 255 000 | from Saint-Amand-les-Eaux to Fresnes-sur-Escaut (PK 48,730) | | | | X | | X | | |
| 255 000 | inside Fresnes-sur-Escaut (PK 48,730 to 49,814) | | X | | | | | | HBNPC network rights-of-way. |
| 255 000 | from Fresnes-sur-Escaut to Blanc-Misseron | | | | X | | X | | |
| 256 000 | Denain to Saint-Amand-les-Eaux | | | | X | | X | | |
| 257 000 | Saint-Amand-les-Eaux to Maulde-Mortagne | | X | | | | | | |
| 258 000 | Aubigny-au-Bac to Somain | | | | | | | | |
| 258 000 | from Aubigny-au-Bac to Aniche | | | | X | | | | |
| 258 000 | from Aniche to Somain | X | | | | | | | |
| 259 000 | Saint-Just-en-Chaussée to Douai | | | | | | | | |
| 259 000 | from Saint-Just-en-Chaussée to Roye (PK 118,175) | | | | X | | | | |
| 259 000 | from Roye to Chaulnes (PK 131,800) | X | | | | | | | |
| 259 000 | from Chaulnes to Péronne-la-Chapelette (PK 148,760) | | | X | | | | | |
| 259 000 | from Péronne-la-Chapelette to Péronne-Flamicourt (PK 150,220) | | | X | | | X | | |
| 259 000 | from Péronne-Flamicourt to Épehy (PK 170,984) | | | | X | | | | |
| 259 000 | from Épehy to Cambrai-Ville(PK 193,599) | | | | X | | | | |
| 259 000 | from Cambrai-Ville to Douai | X | | | | | | | |
| 261 000 | Amiens to Laon | X | | | | | | | |
| 262 000 | Douai to Blanc-Misseron | | | | | | | | |
| 262 000 | from Douai to Beuvrages (PK 246,993) | X | | | | | | | |
| 262 000 | from Beuvrages to Valenciennes(PK 249,312) | | | X | | | | | |
| 262 000 | from Valenciennes to Blanc-Misseron | X | | | | | | | |
| 264 000 | Pont-de-la-Deûle to Bachy-Mouchin | | | | | | | | |
| 264 000 | from Pont-de-la-Deûle to Orchies (PK 236,380) | | | | X | | X | | |
| 264 000 | inside Orchies (PK 236,380 to 241,507) | | | X | | | | | |
| 264 000 | from Orchies to Bachy-Mouchin | | | | X | | X | | |
| 265 000 | Templeuve to Don-Sainghin | | | | | | | | |
| 265 000 | from Templeuve to Seclin (PK 29,280) | | | | X | | X | | |
| 265 000 | inside Seclin (PK 29,280 to 30,825) | | | X | | | | | |
| 265 000 | from Seclin to Don-Sainghin | | | | X | | X | | |
| 265 029 | Seclin to Seclin-Annexe | | | | X | | X | | |
| 267 000 | Fives to Hirson | X | | | | | | | |
| 268 000 | Somain to Halluin | | | | | | | | |
| 268 000 | from Somain to Orchies (PK 245,726) | | | | X | | X | | |
| 268 000 | inside Orchies (PK 245,726 to 246,950) | X | | | | | | | |
| 268 000 | from Orchies to Ascq (PK 264,733) | | X | | | | | | |
| 268 000 | from Ascq to Tourcoing (PK 275,109) | | X | | | | | | |
| 268 000 | inside Tourcoing (PK 245,726 to 276,832) | X | | | | | | | |
| 268 000 | from Tourcoing to Halluin (et to la frontier belge) | | | | X | | X | | |
| 269 000 | Fives to Baisieux (frontier) | X | | | | | | | |
| 271 000 | Roubaix-Wattrelos to Wattrelos | | | | X | | X | | |
| 272 000 | Paris-Nord to Lille | X | | | | | | | |
| 278 000 | Fives to Mouscron (frontier) | X | | | | | | | |
| 281 000 | Lens to Corbehem | | | | | | | | |
| 281 000 | from Lens to Quiéry-la-Motte (PK 225,600) | | | | X | | X | | |
| 281 000 | from Quiéry-la-Motte to Corbehem | X | | | | | | | |
| 284 000 | Lens to Ostricourt | X | | | | | | | |
| 285 000 | Hénin-Beaumont to Bauvin-Provin | | | | X | | X | | |
| 286 000 | Lens to Don-Sainghin | X | | | | | | | |
| 288 000 | Bully-Grenay to La Bassée-Violaines | X | | | | | | | |
| 289 000 | Fives to Abbeville | | | | | | | | |
| 289 000 | from Fives to Saint-Pol-sur-Ternoise (PK 73,480) | X | | | | | | | |
| 289 000 | from Saint-Pol-sur-Ternoise to Abbeville | | | | X | | | | |
| 290 000 | Beuvry to Béthune-Rivage | | | | | | | | |
| 290 000 | from Beuvry to PK 37,480 | X | | | | | | | |
| 290 000 | from PK 37,480 to Béthune-Rivage | | | | X | | | | |
| 291 100 | Lille-Saint-Sauveur to Lille-Port-Vauban | | | | X | | | | |
| 292 000 | Haubourdin to Saint-André | X | | | | | | | |
| 293 000 | Wavrin to Armentières | | | | | | | | |
| 293 000 | from Wavrin to Quesne (PK 238,515) | | | | X | | X | | |
| 293 000 | from Quesne to Armentières | | X | | | | | | |
| 294 000 | Armentières to Arques | | | | | | | | |
| 294 000 | from Armentières to PK 36,106 | X | | | | | | | |
| 294 000 | from PK 36,106 to Merville (PK 39,780) | | | X | | | | | |
| 294 000 | from Merville to Berguette-Isbergues (PK 53,655) | | | | X | | | | |
| 294 000 | from Berguette-Isbergues to Aire-sur-la-Lys (PK 60,076) | | X | | | | | | |
| 294 000 | from Aire-sur-la-Lys to Wardrecques (PK 60,076) | | | | X | | | | |
| 294 000 | from Wardrecques to Arques | | X | | | | | | |
| 295 000 | Lille to Fontinettes | X | | | | | | | |
| 296 000 | La Madeleine to Comines-France | | | | | | | | |
| 296 000 | from La Madeleine to Comines-France (PK 20,500) | X | | | | | | | |
| 296 000 | from Comines-France to la frontier belge | | | | X | | | | |
| 298 000 | Armentières to Houplines | | | | | | | | |
| 298 000 | from Armentières to PK 21,547 | | X | | | | | | |
| 298 000 | from PK 21,547 to Houplines (et to la frontier belge) | | | | X | | X | | |
| 299 000 | Hazebrouck to Boeschepe | | | | X | | X | | |
| 300 000 | Dunkerque-Locale to Bray-Dunes | X | | | | | | | |
| 301 000 | Arras to Dunkerque-Locale | X | | | | | | | |
| 303 000 | Watten-Éperlecques to Bourbourg | | | | X | | X | | |
| 304 000 | Coudekerque-Branche to Fontinettes | X | | | | | | | |
| 305 000 | Saint-Roch to Frévent | | | | | | | | |
| 305 000 | from Saint-Roch to Bertangles-Poulainville (PK 10,791) | X | | | | | | | |
| 305 000 | from Bertangles-Poulainville to Doullens (PK 42,600) | | | | X | | X | | |
| 305 000 | from Doullens to Frévent | | | | X | | X | | |
| 306 000 | Doullens to Arras | | | | | | | | |
| 306 000 | from Doullens to Dainville (PK 74,320) | | | | X | | X | | |
| 306 000 | from Dainville to Arras | | X | | | | | | |
| 307 000 | Arras to Saint-Pol-sur-Ternoise | X | | | | | | | |
| 308 000 | Saint-Pol-sur-Ternoise to Étaples | X | | | | | | | |
| 309 000 | Bully-Grenay to Brias | | | | | | | | |
| 309 000 | from Bully-Grenay to Bruay-les-Alouettes (PK 34,800) | | | X | | | | | |
| 309 000 | from Bruay-les-Alouettes to Brias | | | | X | | X | | |
| 310 000 | Saint-Omer to Hesdigneul | | | | | | | | |
| 310 000 | from Saint-Omer to Lumbres (PK 81,930) | X | | | | | | | |
| 310 000 | from Lumbres to Desvres (PK 101,850) | | | | X | | | | |
| 310 000 | from Desvres to Hesdigneul | X | | | | | | | |
| 311 000 | Longueau to Boulogne-Ville | X | | | | | | | |
| 314 000 | Boulogne-Ville to Calais-Maritime | X | | | | | | | |
| 315 000 | Montsoult-Maffliers to Luzarches | X | | | | | | | |
| 316 000 | Creil to Beauvais | X | | | | | | | |
| 317 000 | Rochy-Condé to Soissons | | | | | | | | |
| 317 000 | from Rochy-Condé to Bresles (PK 14,840) | X | | | | | | | |
| 317 000 | from Bresles to La Rue-Saint-Pierre (PK 19,320) | | | X | | | X | | |
| 317 000 | from La Rue-Saint-Pierre to Clermont-de-l'Oise (PK 26,300) | | | | X | | X | | |
| 317 000 | from Clermont-de-l'Oise to Avrigny (PK 40,442) | X | | | | | | | |
| 317 000 | from Avrigny to Estrées-Saint-Denis (PK 46,758) | | | | X | | X | | |
| 317 000 | from Estrées-Saint-Denis to Lamotte-Breuil (PK 76,550) | X | | | | | | | |
| 317 000 | from Lamotte-Breuil to Vic-sur-Aisne-Ressons (PK 86,100) | | | X | | | | | |
| 317 000 | from Vic-sur-Aisne-Ressons to Soissons | | | | X | | | | |
| 318 000 | La Rue-Saint-Pierre to Saint-Just-en-Chaussée | | | | X | | X | | |
| 319 000 | Breteuil-Embranchement to Breteuil-Ville | X | | | | | | | |
| 320 000 | Saint-Omer-en-Chaussée to Vers | | | | X | | X | | |
| 321 000 | Saint-Roch to Darnétal-Bifurcation | X | | | | | | | |
| 322 000 | Canaples to Longroy-Gamaches | | | | X | | X | | |
| 323 000 | Abbeville to Eu | X | | | | | | | |
| 324 000 | Noyelles-sur-Mer to Saint-Valery-Canal (double gauge) | | | | X | | | | Line operated by CFBS. |
| 325 000 | Épinay-Villetaneuse to Tréport-Mers | X | | | | | | | |
| 326 000 | The Neuville bifurcation to Cergy-Préfecture | X | | | | | | | |
| 328 000 | Ermont-Eaubonne to Valmondois | X | | | | | | | |
| 329 000 | Pierrelaye to Creil | X | | | | | | | |
| 330 000 | Saint-Denis to Dieppe | | | | | | | | |
| 330 000 | from Saint-Denis to Serqueux (PK 118,912) | X | | | | | | | |
| 330 000 | from Serqueux to Arques-la-Bataille (PK 159,500) | | | | X | | X | | |
| 330 000 | from Arques-la-Bataille to Dieppe | X | | | | | | | |
| 332 000 | Beauvais to Gisors-Embranchement | | | | | | | | |
| 332 000 | from Beauvais to Auneuil (PK 12,300) | | | X | | | | | |
| 332 000 | from Auneuil to Gisors | | | | X | | X | | |
| 333 000 | Goincourt to Gournay-Ferrières | | | X | | | X | | |

=== Western Region ===
Legend: (1) Line in operation; (2) Line neutralized; (3) Line closed; (4) Line decommissioned; (5) Line cut-off; (6) Line filed; (7) Line in planning (situation as of July 24, 2019).

| N° | Railway Name | (1) | (2) | (3) | (4) | (5) | (6) | (7) | Observations |
|---|---|---|---|---|---|---|---|---|---|
| 334 000 | Paris-Saint-Lazare to Mantes-Station by Conflans-Sainte-Honorine | X | | | | | | | |
| 334 900 | Paris-Saint-Lazare to Ermont-Eaubonne | X | | | | | | | |
| 336 000 | Conflans-Sainte-Honorine to Éragny-Neuville | X | | | | | | | |
| 338 000 | Achères to Pontoise | X | | | | | | | |
| 339 000 | Gisors-Boisgeloup to Pacy-sur-Eure | | | | X | | X | | |
| 340 000 | Paris-Saint-Lazare to Havre | X | | | | | | | |
| 342 000 | Gisors-Embranchement to Pont-de-l'Arche | | | | | | | | |
| 342 000 | from Gisors to Étrépagny (PK 15,380) | | | | | X | | | |
| 342 000 | from Étrépagny to Pont-de-l'Arche | X | | | | | | | |
| 343 000 | Saint-Pierre-du-Vauvray to Andelys | | | | X | | X | | |
| 344 000 | Charleval to Serqueux | | | | X | | X | | |
| 347 000 | Chars to Magny-en-Vexin | | | | X | | X | | |
| 348 000 | Chars to Marines | | | | X | | X | | |
| 349 000 | Montérolier-Buchy to Saint-Saëns | | | | X | | X | | |
| 350 000 | Malaunay-Le Houlme to Dieppe | X | | | | | | | |
| 351 000 | Barentin to Caudebec-en-Caux | | | | | | | | |
| 351 000 | from Barentin to Duclair (PK 170,300) | | X | | | | | | |
| 351 000 | from Duclair to Caudebec-en-Caux-Marchandises (PK 184,940) | | | X | | | X | | |
| 351 000 | from Caudebec-en-Caux-Marchandises to Caudebec-en-Caux | | | | X | | X | | |
| 353 000 | Motteville to Clères | | | X | | | X | | |
| 354 000 | Montérolier-Buchy to Motteville | X | | | | | | | |
| 356 000 | Rouxmesnil to Eu | | | | | | | | |
| 356 000 | from Rouxmesnil to Envermeu (PK 15,750) | X | | | | | | | |
| 356 000 | from Envermeu to Saint-Quentin-au-Bosc (PK 23,300) | | | | X | | | | Section operated by EDF to serve the Penly nuclear power plant. |
| 356 000 | from Saint-Quentin-au-Bosc to Eu | | | | X | | X | | |
| 357 000 | Dieppe to Fécamp | | | | | | | | |
| 357 000 | from Dieppe to Saint-Pierre-le-Viger (PK 27,400) | | X | | | | X | | |
| 357 000 | from Saint-Pierre-le-Viger to Saint-Vaast-Bosville (PK 40,857) | | X | | | | | | |
| 357 000 | from Saint-Vaast-Bosville to Fécamp | | | | X | | X | | |
| 358 000 | Motteville to Saint-Valery-en-Caux | | | | | | | | |
| 358 000 | from Motteville to PK 199,400 | X | | | | | | | |
| 358 000 | from PK 199,400 to Saint-Valery-en-Caux | | X | | | | X | | Only the station site has been decommissioned. |
| 359 000 | Bréauté-Beuzeville to Fécamp | X | | | | | | | |
| 360 000 | Ifs to Étretat | | | | | | | | |
| 360 000 | from Ifs to PK 217,257 | | X | | | | | | |
| 360 000 | from PK 217,257 to Étretat | | | | X | | | | Tourism operation of the section by TTEPAC. |
| 361 000 | Havre-Graville to Tourville-les-Ifs | | | | | | | | |
| 361 000 | from Havre to Rolleville (PK 233,400) | X | | | | | | | |
| 361 000 | from Rolleville to Criquetot (PK 241,722) | | | | X | | | | |
| 361 000 | from Criquetot to Tourville-les-Ifs | | X | | | | | | |
| 362 000 | Bréauté-Beuzeville to Gravenchon-Port-Jérôme | X | | | | | | | |
| 365 000 | Rouen-Gauche to Petit-Couronne | X | | | | | | | |
| 366 000 | Mantes-la-Jolie to Cherbourg | X | | | | | | | |
| 369 000 | Sotteville to Rouen-Rive-Gauche | X | | | | | | | |
| 370 000 | Saint-Georges-Motel to Grand-Quevilly | | | | | | | | |
| 370 000 | from Saint-Georges-Motel to Acquigny (PK 64,294) | | | | X | | | | From Breuilpont to Cocherel, tourist use of the section by CFVE. |
| 370 000 | from Acquigny to Louviers (PK 70,910) | | | X | | | | | |
| 370 000 | from Louviers to Saint-Pierre-les-Elbeuf (PK 87,270) | | | | X | | | | |
| 370 000 | from Saint-Pierre-les-Elbeuf to Grand-Quevilly | X | | | | | | | |
| 371 000 | Évreux-Embranchement to Acquigny | | | | | | | | |
| 371 000 | from Évreux to Hondouville (PK 17,540) | | | | | X | | | |
| 371 000 | from Hondouville to Acquigny | | X | | | | | | |
| 372 000 | Serquigny to Oissel | X | | | | | | | |
| 375 000 | Évreux-Embranchement to Quetteville | | | | | | | | |
| 375 000 | from Évreux-Embranchement to Glos-Montfort (PK 153,650) | | | | X | | X | | |
| 375 000 | from Glos-Montfort to Quetteville | | X | | | | | | |
| 376 000 | Saint-Pierre-du-Vauvray to Louviers | | X | | | | | | |
| 377 000 | Pont-l'Évêque to Honfleur | | | | | | | | |
| 377 000 | from Pont-l'Évêque to Quetteville (PK 220,400) | | | | X | | | | |
| 377 000 | from Quetteville to Honfleur | | X | | | | | | |
| 379 000 | Mézidon to Trouville-Deauville | | | | | | | | |
| 379 000 | from Mézidon to Dives-Cabourg (PK 27,067) | | | | X | | X | | |
| 379 000 | from Dives-Cabourg to Trouville-Deauville | X | | | | | | | |
| 380 000 | Caen to Dozulé-Putot | | | | X | | X | | |
| 381 000 | Neuilly-la-Forêt to Isigny-sur-Mer | | | | X | | X | | |
| 390 000 | Lisieux to Trouville-Deauville | X | | | | | | | |
| 395 000 | Saint-Cyr to Surdon | X | | | | | | | |
| 396 000 | Plaisir-Grignon to Épône-Mézières | X | | | | | | | |
| 397 000 | Dreux to Saint-Aubin-du-Vieil-Évreux | | | | | | | | |
| 397 000 | from Dreux to Saint-André (Eure) (PK 24,175) | | | | X | | X | | |
| 397 000 | from Saint-André (Eure) to Saint-Aubin-du-Vieil-Évreux | | X | | | | | | |
| 398 000 | Saint-Martin-d'Écublei to Conches | | | | X | | X | | |
| 400 000 | Échauffour to Bernay | | | | X | | X | | |
| 401 000 | La Trinité-de-Réville to Lisieux | | | | X | | X | | |
| 402 000 | Sainte-Gauburge to Mesnil-Mauger | | | | X | | X | | |
| 405 000 | Argentan to Granville | X | | | | | | | |
| 406 000 | Nouvelle Paris-Normandie | | | | | | | X | |
| 408 000 | Connerré to Rennes (LGV) | X | | | | | | | |
| 409 000 | Chartres to Dreux | | | | | | | | |
| 409 000 | from Chartres to Saint-Sauveur-Châteauneuf (PK 24,024) | X | | | | | | | |
| 409 000 | from Saint-Sauveur-Châteauneuf to Aunay-Tréon (PK 34,274) | | X | | | | | | |
| 409 000 | d’Aunay-Tréon to Dreux | X | | | | | | | |
| 410 000 | Coulibœuf to Falaise | | | | X | | X | | |
| 411 000 | Falaise to Berjou | | | | X | | X | | |
| 412 000 | Caen to Cerisy-Belle-Étoile | | | | | | | | |
| 412 000 | from Caen to Saint-Rémy (Calvados) (PK 273,080) | | | X | | | X | | |
| 412 000 | from Saint-Rémy to Cerisy-Belle-Étoile | | | X | | | | | Section from the Gouttes tunnel to Pont-Érambourg operated as a tourist attraction by the Amicale pour la mise en valeur from la ligne Caen-Flers (ACF). |
| 413 000 | Caen to Vire | | | | X | | X | | |
| 414 000 | Saint-Lô to Guilberville | | | | | | | | |
| 414 000 | from Saint-Lô to Condé-sur-Vire (PK 12,000) | | X | | | | | | Touring by velorail between Gourfaleur and Condé-sur-Vire. |
| 414 000 | from Condé-sur-Vire to Guilberville | | | | X | | X | | |
| 415 000 | Lison to Lamballe | X | | | | | | | |
| 416 000 | Orval-Hyenville to Regnéville | | | | X | | X | | |
| 417 000 | Coutances to Sottevast | | | | X | | X | | |
| 418 000 | Carentan to Carteret | | | | | | | | |
| 418 000 | from Carentan to Port-Bail | | | | X | | X | | |
| 418 000 | from Port-Bail to Carteret | | | | X | | | | Section operated by ATCM for tourism purposes. |
| 420 000 | Paris-Montparnasse to Brest | X | | | | | | | |
| 422 000 | La Loupe to Prey | | | | | | | | |
| 422 000 | from La Loupe to La Framboisière (PK 13,262) | | X | | | | | | To serve the Dreux-Louvilliers airbase EP. |
| 422 000 | from La Framboisière to Breteuil (Eure) (PK 54,365) | | | | X | | X | | |
| 422 000 | from Breteuil (Eure) to Prey | | X | | | | | | |
| 423 000 | Alençon to Condé-sur-Huisne | | | | | X | X | | |
| 424 000 | Mortagne-au-Perche to L'Aigle | | | | X | | X | | |
| 425 000 | Mortagne-au-Perche to Sainte-Gauburge | | | | X | | X | | |
| 426 000 | Mamers to Mortagne-au-Perche | | | | X | | X | | |
| 427 000 | La Hutte-Coulombiers to Mamers | | | | X | | X | | |
| 428 000 | Sillé-le-Guillaume to La Hutte-Coulombiers | | | | | | | | |
| 428 000 | from Sillé-le-Guillaume to Ségrie-Vernie (PK 13,500) | | X | | | | | | |
| 428 000 | from Ségrie-Vernie to La Hutte-Coulombiers | | | | X | | X | | |
| 429 000 | Courtalain to Conneré (LGV) | X | | | | | | | |
| 430 000 | Mans to Mézidon | X | | | | | | | |
| 431 000 | Paris-Montparnasse to Monts (LGV) | | | | | | | | |
| 431 000 | from Paris-Montparnasse to Chambray-lès-Tours (PK 223,628) | X | | | | | | | |
| 431 000 | from Chambray-lès-Tours to Monts | | | X | | | | | |
| 432 000 | Alençon to Domfront | | | | | | | | |
| 432 000 | from Alençon to Couterne (PK 46,200) | | | X | | | | | |
| 432 000 | from Couterne to Domfront | | | | X | | X | | |
| 433 000 | Couterne to La Ferté-Macé | | | | X | | X | | |
| 434 000 | Briouze to La Ferté-Macé | | | | X | | X | | |
| 435 000 | Pré-en-Pail to Mayenne | | | | | | | | |
| 435 000 | from Pré-en-Pail to PK 5,180 | | | X | | | | | |
| 435 000 | from PK 5,180 to Mayenne | | | | X | | X | | |
| 436 000 | La Chapelle-Anthenaise to Flers | | | | | | | | |
| 436 000 | from La Chapelle-Anthenaise to Ambrières (PK 323,315) | | | X | | | | | |
| 436 000 | from Ambrières to Flers | | | | X | | X | | |
| 437 000 | Domfront to Pontaubault | | | | X | | X | | |
| 438 000 | Mayenne to La Selle-en-Luitré | | | | X | | X | | |
| 439 000 | Vitré to Pontorson | | | | | | | | |
| 439 000 | from Vitré to Montreuil-sous-Pérouse (PK 7,535) | X | | | | | | | |
| 439 000 | from Montreuil-sous-Pérouse to Fougères (PK 36,157) | | | X | | | X | | |
| 439 000 | from Fougères to Pontorson | | | | X | | X | | |
| 440 000 | Vire to Romagny | | | | X | | X | | |
| 441 000 | Rennes to Saint-Malo-Saint-Servan | X | | | | | | | |
| 443 000 | La Brohinière to Dinan | | | | X | | X | | |
| 444 000 | Dinan to Dinard-Saint-Énogat | | | | X | | X | | |
| 445 000 | Saint-Brieuc to Légué | | | X | | | | | |
| 446 000 | Plouaret to Lannion | X | | | | | | | |
| 446 506 | Ligne from Lannion to Lannion port | X | | | | | | | |
| 447 000 | Morlaix to Roscoff | X | | | | | | | |
| 448 000 | Saint-Hilaire-du-Harcouët to Fougères | | | | X | | X | | |
| 450 000 | Mans to Angers-Maître-École | X | | | | | | | |
| 451 000 | LGV Le Mans-Angers | | | | | | | X | |
| 452 000 | LGV Bordeaux-Toulouse | | | | | | | X | |
| 453 000 | Miniac-Morvan to La Gouesnière-Cancale-Saint-Méloir | | | | X | | X | | |
| 454 000 | LGV Poitiers-Limoges | | | | | | | X | |
| 456 000 | Juigné-sur-Sarthe to Sillé-le-Guillaume | | | | X | | X | | |
| 457 000 | Segré to Nantes-État | | | | | | | | |
| 457 000 | from Segré to Carquefou (PK 383,710) | | | | X | | X | | |
| 457 000 | from Carquefou to Nantes | | X | | | | | | |
| 458 000 | Laval to Gennes-Longuefuye | | | | | | | | |
| 458 000 | from Laval to Bonchamp-les-Laval (PK 303,875) | | | X | | | | | |
| 458 000 | from Bonchamp-les-Laval to Longuefuye (PK 329,139) | | | | X | | X | | |
| 458 000 | from Longuefuye to Gennes-Longuefuye | | X | | | | | | |
| 460 000 | Sablé to Montoir-de-Bretagne | | | | | | | | |
| 460 000 | from Sablé to Château-Gontier (PK 289,985) | X | | | | | | | |
| 460 000 | from PK 293,160 to PK 302,400 | | | | X | | X | | |
| 460 000 | from PK 302,400 to Châteaubriant | | | X | | | X | | |
| 460 000 | from Châteaubriant to PK 356,280 | X | | | | | | | |
| 460 000 | from PK 356,280 to PK 359,200 | | X | | | | | | |
| 460 000 | from PK 359,200 to PK 364,442 | | | X | | | | | |
| 460 000 | from PK 364,442 to Besné-Pont-Château (PK 429,257) | | | | X | | X | | |
| 460 000 | from Besné-Pont-Château to Montoir-de-Bretagne | | X | | | | | | |
| 461 000 | Chemazé to Craon | | | | X | | X | | |
| 462 000 | Laval to Pouancé | | | | X | | X | | |
| 463 000 | Châteaubriant to Ploërmel | | | | X | | X | | |
| 464 000 | Saint-Vincent-des-Landes to Massérac | | | | X | | X | | |
| 465 000 | Beslé to Blain | | | | X | | X | | |
| 466 000 | Châteaubriant to Rennes | X | | | | | | | |
| 467 000 | Martigné-Ferchaud to Vitré | | | | X | | X | | |
| 468 000 | Rennes to Redon | X | | | | | | | |
| 470 000 | Savenay to Landerneau | X | | | | | | | |
| 471 000 | Questembert to Ploërmel | | | | X | | X | | |
| 472 000 | Ploërmel to La Brohinière | | | | | | | | |
| 472 000 | from Ploërmel to Mauron (PK 52,150) | | | | X | | X | | |
| 472 000 | from Mauron to Gaël (PK 59,800) | | | X | | | | | |
| 472 000 | from Gaël to La Brohinière | X | | | | | | | |
| 473 000 | Auray to Quiberon | X | | | | | | | |
| 474 000 | Auray to Pontivy | X | | | | | | | |
| 475 000 | Saint-Brieuc to Pontivy | | | | | | | | |
| 475 000 | from Saint-Brieuc to Loudéac (PK 525,700) | X | | | | | | | |
| 475 000 | from Loudéac to Saint-Gérand (PK 537,531) | | X | | | | | | |
| 475 000 | from Saint-Gérand to Pontivy | X | | | | | | | |
| 476 000 | Rosporden to Concarneau | | | | | | | | |
| 476 000 | from Rosporden to the ZI de Coat-Conq (PK 671,700) | X | | | | | | | |
| 476 000 | from the ZI de Coat-Conq to Concarneau | | | X | | | | | |
| 477 000 | Quimper to Pont-l'Abbé | | | | | | | | |
| 477 000 | from Quimper to Pluguffan (PK 695,190) | X | | | | | | | |
| 477 000 | from Pluguffan to Pont-l'Abbé | | | | X | | X | | |
| 478 000 | Quimper to Douarnenez-Tréboul | | | | X | | X | | |
| 480 000 | Carhaix to Camaret-sur-Mer (1 m) | | | | X | | X | | RB line leased from SE. |
| 481 000 | Perros-Saint-Fiacre to Fret (1 m) | | | | X | | X | | RB line leased from SE. |
| 482 000 | Saint-Méen to Loudéac (1 m) | | | | X | | X | | RB line leased from SE. |
| 483 000 | Morlaix to Carhaix (1 m) | | | | X | | X | | RB line leased from SE. |
| 484 000 | Carhaix to Rosporden (1 m) | | | | X | | X | | RB line leased from SE. |
| 485 000 | Guingamp to Carhaix | X | | | | | | | Originally a metre-gauge line, now operated by Transdev Rail under a leasing agreement. |
| 486 000 | Guingamp to Paimpol | X | | | | | | | Line leased to Transdev Rail. |
| 487 000 | Carhaix to Loudéac (1 m) | | | | X | | X | | RB line leased from SE. |
| 500 000 | Chartres to Bordeaux-Saint-Jean | | | | | | | | |
| 500 000 | from Chartres to Mondoubleau (PK 163,598) | X | | | | | | | |
| 500 000 | from Mondoubleau to Bessé-sur-Braye (PK 183,400) | | | | X | | X | | |
| 500 000 | from Bessé-sur-Braye to Chenu (PK 232,700) | X | | | | | | | |
| 500 000 | from Chenu to Vivy (PK 277,450) | | X | | | | | | |
| 500 000 | from Vivy to Bordeaux-Saint-Jean | X | | | | | | | |
| 504 000 | Brou to La Loupe | | | | X | | X | | |
| 505 000 | Arrou to Nogent-le-Rotrou | | | | X | | X | | |
| 506 000 | Thorigné to Courtalain-Saint-Pellerin | | | | X | | X | | |
| 507 000 | Bessé-sur-Braye to Saint-Calais | | | | X | | X | | |
| 508 000 | Aubigné-Racan to Sablé | | | | | | | | |
| 508 000 | from Aubigné-Racan to Thorée-les-Pins (PK 318,025) | | | | X | | X | | |
| 508 000 | from Thorée-les-Pins to La Flèche (PK 329,900) | | | | | X | X | | |
| 508 000 | from La Flèche to the bifurcation of l'Aubinière (PK 336,465) | | | X | | | | | |
| 508 000 | from the bifurcation of l'Aubinière to Louailles (PK 349,400) | | | | X | | X | | |
| 508 000 | from Louailles to La Chapelle-du-Chêne (PK 353,254) | | X | | | | | | |
| 508 000 | from La Chapelle-du-Chêne to Sablé | X | | | | | | | |
| 509 000 | L'Aubinière to La Suze | | | X | | | | | |
| 510 000 | La Flèche to Vivy | | | | | | | | |
| 510 000 | from La Flèche to Longué (PK 35,932) | | | | X | | X | | |
| 510 000 | from Longué to Vivy | X | | | | | | | |
| 511 000 | Angers-Saint-Laud to La Flèche | | | | | | | | |
| 511 000 | from Angers-Saint-Laud to Saint-Barthélémy-d'Anjou (PK 4,140) | | | X | | | | | |
| 511 000 | from Saint-Barthélémy-d'Anjou to Gouis (PK 36,931) | | | | X | | X | | |
| 511 000 | from Gouis to La Flèche | | | X | | | | | |
| 515 000 | Tours to Saint-Nazaire | X | | | | | | | |
| 516 000 | Saint-Nazaire to Croisic | X | | | | | | | |
| 517 000 | La Baule-Escoublac to Guérande | | | | X | | X | | |
| 518 000 | Segré to Angers-Saint-Serge | | | | | | | | |
| 518 000 | from Segré to Montreuil-Belfroy (PK 342,220) | | | | X | | X | | |
| 518 000 | from Montreuil-Belfroy to Angers-Saint-Serge | | | X | | | | | |
| 519 000 | Nantes-Orléans to Châteaubriant | X | | | | | | | |
| 520 000 | Blain to La Chapelle-sur-Erdre | | | | X | | X | | |
| 521 000 | Loudun to Angers-Maître-École | | | | | | | | |
| 521 000 | from Loudun to Montreuil-Bellay (PK 92,050) | | | | X | | X | | |
| 521 000 | inside Montreuil-Bellay (PK 92,050 to 93,057) | | | X | | | | | Section used to serve the Méron industrial zone. |
| 521 000 | from Montreuil-Bellay to Angers-Saint-Serge | | | | X | | X | | |
| 522 000 | Perray-Jouannet to Fourneaux | | | | X | | X | | |
| 523 000 | La Possonnière to Niort | | | | | | | | |
| 523 000 | from La Possonnière to Cholet (PK 44,234) | X | | | | | | | |
| 523 000 | from Cholet to Nueil-les-Aubiers (PK 73,520) | | X | | | | | | |
| 523 000 | from Nueil-les-Aubiers to Bressuire (PK 88,900) | | | | X | | X | | |
| 523 000 | from Bressuire to Breuil-Barret (PK 118,810) | | | | | X | X | | |
| 523 000 | from Breuil-Barret to Benet (PK 151,800) | | | | X | | X | | |
| 523 000 | from Benet to Niort | | | X | | | | | |
| 524 000 | Neuville-de-Poitou to Bressuire | | | | | | | | |
| 524 000 | from Neuville-de-Poitou to Chalandray (PK 21,250) | X | | | | | | | |
| 524 000 | from Chalandray to Parthenay (PK 36,250) | | X | | | | | | |
| 524 000 | from Parthenay to Bressuire | | | | X | | X | | |
| 525 000 | Sables-d'Olonne to Tours | | | | | | | | |
| 525 000 | des Sables-d'Olonne to Beuxes (PK 187,100) | X | | | | | | | |
| 525 000 | from Beuxes to Chinon (PK 200,727) | | X | | | | | | |
| 525 000 | from Chinon to Tours | X | | | | | | | |
| 526 000 | Vouvant-Cezais to Saint-Christophe-du-Bois | | | | | | | | |
| 526 000 | from Vouvant-Cezais to PK 19,490 | | | | X | | X | | |
| 526 000 | from km 19,490 to Chantonnay | | | X | | | | | |
| 526 000 | from Chantonnay to Saint-Christophe-du-Bois | | | | X | | | | From Herbiers to Mortagne-sur-Sèvre, a section operated as a tourist attraction by the Chemin de fer de la Vendée. |
| 527 000 | Clisson to Cholet | X | | | | | | | |
| 528 000 | Breuil-Barret to Velluire | | | | | | | | |
| 528 000 | from Breuil-Barret to Fontenay-le-Comte (PK 29,985) | | | | X | | | | |
| 528 000 | inside Fontenay-le-Comte (PK 29,985 to 30,310) | X | | | | | | | |
| 528 000 | from Fontenay-le-Comte to Velluire | | | | X | | X | | |
| 529 000 | Fontenay-le-Comte to Benet | X | | | | | | | |
| 530 000 | Nantes-Orléans to Saintes | X | | | | | | | |
| 531 000 | Nantilly to Saumur-Rive-Gauche | | | | | X | X | | |
| 534 000 | Nantes-État to La Roche-sur-Yon by Sainte-Pazanne | | | | | | | | |
| 534 000 | from Nantes-État to the Commequiers bifurcation (PK 68,427) | X | | | | | | | |
| 534 000 | from the Commequiers bifurcation to La Roche-sur-Yon | | | | | X | X | | |
| 535 000 | Commequiers to Saint-Gilles-Croix-de-Vie | | | | | | | | |
| 535 000 | from Commequiers to the Commequiers bifurcation (PK 1,310) | | | | | X | X | | |
| 535 000 | from the Commequiers bifurcation to Saint-Gilles-Croix-de-Vie | X | | | | | | | |
| 536 000 | Sainte-Pazanne to Pornic | X | | | | | | | |
| 537 000 | Saint-Hilaire-de-Chaléons to Paimbœuf | | X | | | | | | |
| 538 000 | Saint-Benoît to La Rochelle-Ville | X | | | | | | | |
| 539 000 | La Rochelle-Ville to La Rochelle-Pallice | X | | | | | | | |
| 540 000 | Aigreffeuille-le-Thou to Rochefort | | | | X | | X | | |
| 541 000 | Saint-Laurent-de-la-Prée to Pointe-de-la Fumée | | | | X | | X | | |
| 542 000 | Cabariot to Chapus | | | | X | | X | | |
| 543 000 | Saint-Jean-d'Angély to Taillebourg | | | | X | | X | | |
| 544 000 | Saintes to Royan | X | | | | | | | |
| 545 000 | Saujon to La Grève | | | | X | | X | | Operated as a tourist service by Train des mouettes. |
| 546 000 | Pons to Saujon | | | | | | | | |
| 546 000 | from Pons to Gémozac (PK 9,780) | | | | X | | X | | |
| 546 000 | from Gémozac to Saujon | X | | | | | | | |
| 553 000 | Ouest-Ceinture to Chartres | | | | | | | | |
| 553 000 | from Ouest-Ceinture to Montrouge (PK 6,018) | X | | | | | | | |
| 553 000 | from Montrouge to Massy-Palaiseau (PK 16,115) | | | | X | | X | | Line platform reused by the LGV Atlantique. |
| 553 000 | from Massy-Palaiseau to Gallardon-Pont (PK 66,367) | | | | X | | X | | |
| 553 000 | from Gallardon-Pont to Chartres | X | | | | | | | |
| 554 000 | Auneau-Ville to Dreux | | | | X | | X | | |

=== Southwest Region ===
Legend: (1) Line in operation; (2) Line neutralized; (3) Line closed; (4) Line decommissioned; (5) Line cut-off; (6) Line filed; (7) Line in planning (situation as of July 24, 2019).

| N° | Railway Name | (1) | (2) | (3) | (4) | (5) | (6) | (7) | Observations |
|---|---|---|---|---|---|---|---|---|---|
| 547 000 | Saint-Mariens-Saint-Yzan to Blaye | | X | | | | | | |
| 549 000 | Étampes to Auneau-Embranchement | | | | X | | X | | |
| 550 000 | Brétigny to La Membrolle-sur-Choisille | X | | | | | | | |
| 551 000 | Bourg-la-Reine to Sceaux-Robinson | X | | | | | | | Line owned and operated by RATP. |
| 552 000 | Paris-Luxembourg to Limours | | | | | | | | |
| 552 000 | from Paris-Luxembourg to Saint-Rémy-lès-Chevreuse | X | | | | | | | Line owned and operated by RATP. |
| 552 000 | from Saint-Rémy-lès-Chevreuse to Limours | | | | X | | X | | |
| 555 000 | Beaulieu-le-Coudray to Auneau-Embranchement | | | | | | | | |
| 555 000 | from Beaulieu-le-Coudray to Auneau-Ville (PK 20,162) | | | | X | | X | | |
| 555 000 | from Auneau-Ville to Auneau-Embranchement | X | | | | | | | |
| 556 000 | Chartres to Orléans | X | | | | | | | |
| 557 000 | Voves to Toury | | | | | | | | |
| 557 000 | from Voves to Janville (PK 24,470) | | | | X | | X | | |
| 557 000 | from Janville to Toury | X | | | | | | | |
| 558 000 | Courtalain-Saint-Pellerin to Patay | | | | | | | | |
| 558 000 | from Courtalain-Saint-Pellerin to Châteaudun (PK 18,681) | | | | X | | X | | |
| 558 000 | from Châteaudun to Patay | X | | | | | | | |
| 559 000 | Pont-de-Braye to Blois | | | | | | | | |
| 559 000 | from Pont-de-Braye to Troo (PK 8,020) | | | | X | | X | | |
| 559 000 | from Troo to Montoire-sur-le-Loir (PK 12,340) | | X | | | | | | |
| 559 000 | from Montoire-sur-le-Loir to Selommes (PK 45,600) | X | | | | | | | |
| 559 000 | from Selommes to Villefrancœur (PK 50,942) | | | | X | | X | | |
| 559 000 | from Villefrancœur to Blois | X | | | | | | | |
| 560 000 | Sargé-sur-Braye to Vouvray | | | | X | | X | | |
| 561 000 | Tours to Mans | X | | | | | | | |
| 566 000 | Ligne SEA-Atlantique (LGV) | X | | | | | | | |
| 567 000 | Nantes-État to Indret | | | | X | | X | | |
| 568 000 | Lormont to Bordeaux-Bastide | X | | | | | | | |
| 569 000 | Aubrais-Orléans to Orléans | X | | | | | | | |
| 570 000 | Paris-Austerlitz to Bordeaux-Saint-Jean | X | | | | | | | |
| 571 000 | Port-Boulet to Port-de-Piles | | | | | | | | |
| 571 000 | from Port-Boulet to Chinon (PK 13,500) | | | | X | | X | | |
| 571 000 | inside Chinon (PK 13,500 to 14,900) | | | X | | | | | |
| 571 000 | inside Chinon (PK 14,900 to 15,920) | | X | | | | | | |
| 571 000 | from Chinon to Trogues (PK 36,390) | | | | X | | | | |
| 571 000 | from Trogues to PK 50,885 | | | X | | | | | |
| 571 000 | from PK 50,885 to Port-de-Piles | X | | | | | | | |
| 572 000 | Ligré-Rivière to Richelieu | | | X | | | X | | |
| 573 000 | Loudun to Châtellerault | | | | | | | | |
| 573 000 | from Loudun to Bouchet (PK 36,390) | | | X | | | | | |
| 573 000 | from Bouchet to Châtellerault-Châteauneuf (PK 47,500) | | | | X | | X | | |
| 573 000 | from Châtellerault-Châteauneuf to Châtellerault | | | X | | | | | |
| 574 000 | Poitiers to Arçay | | | | | | | | |
| 574 000 | from Poitiers to Neuville-de-Poitou (PK 17,310) | X | | | | | | | |
| 574 000 | from Neuville-de-Poitou to Saint-Jean-de-Sauves (PK 40,220) | | | | X | | X | | |
| 574 000 | from Saint-Jean-de-Sauves to Arçay | | | X | | | | | |
| 575 000 | Airvault-Gare to Moncontour | | | | X | | X | | |
| 578 000 | Aiffres to Ruffec | | | | | | | | |
| 578 000 | from Aiffres to Prahecq (PK 4,500) | X | | | | | | | |
| 578 000 | from Prahecq to Ruffec | | | | X | | X | | |
| 579 000 | Beillant to Angoulême | X | | | | | | | |
| 580 000 | Châteauneuf-sur-Charente to Saint-Mariens-Saint-Yzan | | | | | | | | |
| 580 000 | from Châteauneuf-sur-Charente to Clérac-Charente (PK 53,500) | | | | X | | X | | |
| 580 000 | from Clérac-Charente to Saint-Mariens-Saint-Yzan | | X | | | | | | |
| 581 000 | Cavignac to Coutras | | | | | | | | |
| 581 000 | from Cavignac to Guîtres (PK 20,700) | | | | X | | | | From Marcenais to Guîtres, a section operated as a tourist attraction by the TTGM. |
| 581 000 | from Guîtres to Coutras | | | X | | | | | |
| 582 000 | Marcenais to Libourne | | | | X | | X | | |
| 583 000 | Bassens to Bec-d'Ambès | X | | | | | | | Line operated by the Grand Port Maritime de Bordeaux. |
| 584 000 | Ravezies to Pointe-de-Grave | | | | | | | | |
| 584 000 | from Ravezies to the bif. of Beyreman (PK 3,595) | | | | | | | | Part of the platform was reclaimed by TBM to build the Blanquefort branch of Bordeaux's tramway line C. |
| 584 000 | from the bif. of Beyreman to Pointe-de-Grave | X | | | | | | | |
| 586 000 | Ceinture de Bordeaux | X | | | | | | | |
| 590 000 | Aubrais-Orléans to Montauban-Ville-Bourbon | X | | | | | | | |
| 591 000 | Villefranche-sur-Cher to Blois | | | | | | | | |
| 591 000 | from Villefranche-sur-Cher to Romorantin-Lanthenay (PK 130,937) | | X | | | | | | |
| 591 000 | inside Romorantin-Lanthenay (PK 130,937 to 131,428) | | | X | | | | | |
| 591 000 | from Romorantin-Lanthenay to La Chaussée-Saint-Victor (PK 174,500) | | | | X | | X | | |
| 591 000 | from La Chaussée-Saint-Victor to Blois | X | | | | | | | |
| 592 000 | Saint-Aignan-Noyers to Blois (1 m) | | | | X | | X | | |
| 593 000 | Vierzon to Saint-Pierre-des-Corps | X | | | | | | | |
| 594 000 | Joué-lès-Tours to Châteauroux | | | | | | | | |
| 594 000 | from Joué-lès-Tours to Verneuil-Saint-Germain (PK 290,000) | X | | | | | | | |
| 594 000 | from Verneuil-Saint-Germain to Buzançais (PK 327,200) | | X | | | | | | |
| 594 000 | from Buzançais to Châteauroux | X | | | | | | | |
| 597 000 | Sainte-Maure-Noyant to Sainte-Maure-Ville | | | | X | | X | | |
| 598 000 | Port-de-Piles to Argenton-sur-Creuse | | | | | | | | |
| 598 000 | from Port-de-Piles to Descartes (PK 289,220) | X | | | | | | | |
| 598 000 | from Descartes to Argenton-sur-Creuse (PK 383,000) | | | | X | | X | | |
| 599 000 | Châtellerault to Launay | | | | X | | X | | |
| 600 000 | Salbris to Blanc (1 m) | | | | | | | | |
| 600 000 | from Salbris to Luçay-le-Mâle (PK 245,900) | X | | | | | | | Blanc-Argent line operated by Kéolis. |
| 600 000 | from Luçay-le-Mâle to Argy (PK 273,000) | | | | X | | | | Section operated for tourism purposes by SABA between Valençay and Argy. |
| 600 000 | from Argy to Blanc | | | | X | | X | | The section between Argy and Buzançais was upgraded to standard gauge to serve the Argy silo. |
| 601 000 | Saint-Benoît to Blanc | | | | | | | | |
| 601 000 | from Saint-Benoît to Jardres (PK 361,400) | X | | | | | | | |
| 601 000 | from Jardres to Saint-Aigny-Le Blanc (PK 404,000) | | | | X | | X | | |
| 601 000 | from Saint-Aigny-Le Blanc to Blanc | | | | | X | X | | |
| 603 000 | Montmorillon to Saint-Aigny-Le Blanc | | | | X | | X | | |
| 604 000 | Mignaloux-Nouaillé to Bersac | | | | | | | | |
| 604 000 | from Mignaloux-Nouaillé to Dorat (PK 419,840) | X | | | | | | | |
| 604 000 | from Dorat to Bessines (PK 445,900) | | | X | | | | | |
| 604 000 | from Bessines to Bersac | X | | | | | | | |
| 605 000 | Dorat to Magnac-Laval | | | | X | | X | | |
| 606 000 | Dorat to Limoges-Bénédictins | X | | | | | | | |
| 607 000 | Lussac-les-Châteaux to Saint-Saviol | | | | | | | | |
| 607 000 | from Lussac-les-Châteaux to Civray (PK 433,937) | | | | X | | X | | |
| 607 000 | from Civray to PK 438,700 | | X | | | | | | |
| 607 000 | from PK 438,700 to Saint-Saviol | X | | | | | | | |
| 608 000 | Roumazières-Loubert to Vigeant | | | | | | | | |
| 608 000 | from Roumazières-Loubert to Confolens (PK 16,935) | | | | | X | | | Section operated as a tourist attraction by CFCL. |
| 608 000 | from Confolens to Vigeant | | | | X | | X | | |
| 609 000 | Ruffec to Roumazières-Loubert | | | | X | | X | | |
| 610 000 | Limoges-Bénédictins to Angoulême | X | | | | | | | |
| 611 000 | Limoges-Bénédictins to Périgueux | X | | | | | | | |
| 613 000 | Nexon to Brive-la-Gaillarde | X | | | | | | | |
| 614 000 | Bussière-Galant to Saint-Yrieix | | | | X | | X | | |
| 615 000 | Saillat-sur-Vienne to Bussière-Galant | | | | | | | | |
| 615 000 | from Saillat-Chassenon to Châlus (PK 484,211) | | | | X | | X | | |
| 615 000 | from Châlus to Bussière-Galant | | | | X | | | | Section operated by velorail for tourist purposes. |
| 616 000 | Thiviers to Saint-Aulaire | | | | X | | X | | |
| 617 000 | Quéroy-Pranzac to Thiviers | | | | X | | X | | |
| 618 000 | Magnac-Touvre to Marmande | | | | X | | X | | |
| 619 000 | Ribérac to Parcoul-Médillac | | | | X | | X | | |
| 620 000 | La Cave to Ribérac | | | | X | | X | | |
| 621 000 | Coutras to Tulle | X | | | | | | | |
| 623 000 | Hautefort to Terrasson | | | | X | | X | | |
| 627 000 | Condat-Le Lardin to Sarlat | | | | X | | X | | |
| 628 000 | Siorac-en-Périgord to Cazoulès | | | | | | | | |
| 628 000 | from Siorac-en-Périgord to Sarlat (PK 591,190) | X | | | | | | | |
| 628 000 | from Sarlat to Cazoulès | | | | X | | X | | |
| 629 000 | Libourne to Buisson | X | | | | | | | |
| 630 000 | Carsac to Gourdon | | | | | | | | |
| 630 000 | from Carsac to PK 582,468 | | | | X | | X | | |
| 630 000 | from PK 582,468 to Gourdon | | | X | | | | | |
| 631 000 | Niversac to Agen | X | | | | | | | |
| 632 000 | Monsempron-Libos to Cahors | | | | | | | | |
| 632 000 | from Monsempron-Libos to Fumel (PK 610,826) | | | X | | | | | |
| 632 000 | from Fumel to Cahors | | | | X | | X | | |
| 633 000 | Cahors to Moissac | | | | X | | X | | Unfinished line. |
| 634 000 | Penne-d'Agenais to Tonneins | | | | | | | | |
| 634 000 | from Penne-d'Agenais to Villeneuve-sur-Lot (PK 633,679) | | X | | | | | | |
| 634 000 | from Villeneuve-sur-Lot to Tonneins | | | | X | | X | | |
| 635 000 | Villeneuve-sur-Lot to Falgueyrat | | | | X | | X | | |
| 637 000 | Bordeaux-Benauge to La Sauvetat-du-Dropt | | | | | | | | |
| 637 000 | from Bordeaux-Benauge to Latresne (PK 11,000) | | | X | | | X | | |
| 637 000 | from Latresne to La Sauvetat-du-Dropt | | | | X | | X | | |
| 640 000 | Bordeaux-Saint-Jean to Sète-Ville | X | | | | | | | |
| 640 100 | Colombiers to Cazouls-lès-Béziers | | | | X | | X | | |
| 641 000 | Langon to Gabarret | | | | | | | | |
| 641 000 | inside Langon (PK 44,460 to 45,200) | | X | | | | | | |
| 641 000 | inside Langon (PK 45,200 to 46,675) | | | X | | | | | |
| 641 000 | from Langon to Gabarret | | | | X | | X | | |
| 642 000 | Marmande to Mont-de-Marsan | | | | | | | | |
| 642 000 | from Marmande to Casteljaloux (PK 104,390) | | | X | | | | | |
| 642 000 | from Casteljaloux to Bourriot-Bergonce (PK 139,400) | | | | X | | X | | |
| 642 000 | from Bourriot-Bergonce to Roquefort (PK 152,100) | | | | | X | X | | |
| 642 000 | from Roquefort to Mont-de-Marsan | | X | | | | | | |
| 643 000 | Port-Sainte-Marie to Riscle | | | | | | | | |
| 643 000 | from Port-Sainte-Marie to Condom (PK 155,086) | | X | | | | | | |
| 643 000 | from Condom to Gondrin (PK 171,000) | | | | | X | X | | |
| 643 000 | from Gondrin to Eauze (PK 188,868) | | | | X | | X | | |
| 643 000 | from Eauze to Mont-de-Marsan | | | X | | | | | |
| 644 000 | Nérac to Mont-de-Marsan | | | | | | | | |
| 644 000 | from Nérac to Mézin (PK 148,900) | | X | | | | | | |
| 644 000 | from Mézin to Mont-de-Marsan | | | | | X | X | | |
| 645 000 | Condom to Castéra-Verduzan | | | | X | | X | | |
| 646 000 | Eauze to Auch | | | | X | | X | | |
| 647 000 | Bon-Encontre to Vic-en-Bigorre | | | | | | | | |
| 647 000 | from Bon-Encontre to PK 185,000 | | X | | | | | | |
| 647 000 | from PK 185 to Auch (PK 204,130) | | | X | | | | | |
| 647 000 | inside Auch (PK 204,130 to 204,675) | X | | | | | | | |
| 647 000 | inside Auch (PK 204,675 to 206,577) | | | | | X | | | |
| 647 000 | from Auch to Vic-en-Bigorre | | | | X | | X | | |
| 648 000 | Saint-Agne to Auch | X | | | | | | | |
| 649 000 | Castelsarrasin to Beaumont-de-Lomagne | X | | | | | | | |
| 650 000 | Toulouse to Bayonne | X | | | | | | | |
| 651 000 | LGV Bordeaux-Espagne | | | | | | | X | |
| 652 000 | Morcenx to Bagnères-de-Bigorre | | | | | | | | |
| 652 000 | from Morcenx to Mont-de-Marsan (PK 149,000) | X | | | | | | | |
| 652 000 | from Mont-de-Marsan to PK 187,761 | | X | | | | | | |
| 652 000 | from PK 187,761 to Tarbes (PK 245,120) | | | X | | | | | |
| 652 000 | from Tarbes to Ampèrevielle (PK 248,976) | | X | | | | | | |
| 652 000 | from Ampèrevielle to Bagnères-de-Bigorre | | | X | | | | | |
| 653 000 | Saint-Sever to Hagetmau | | X | | | | | | |
| 654 000 | Dax to Mont-de-Marsan | | | | | | | | |
| 654 000 | from Dax to Narrosse (PK 156,500) | X | | | | | | | |
| 654 000 | from Narrosse to Augreilh (PK 192,200) | | | | X | | X | | |
| 654 000 | from Augreilh to Mont-de-Marsan | | X | | | | | | |
| 655 000 | Bordeaux-Saint-Jean to Irun | X | | | | | | | |
| 656 000 | Puyoô to Dax | X | | | | | | | |
| 657 000 | Lamothe to Arcachon | X | | | | | | | |
| 658 000 | Bayonne to Allées-Marines | | | | | | | | |
| 658 000 | from Bayonne to PK 203,020 | X | | | | | | | |
| 658 000 | from PK 203,020 to Allées-Marines | | | X | | | | | |
| 659 000 | Biarritz-la-Négresse to Biarritz-Ville | | | | X | | X | | |
| 660 000 | Bayonne to Saint-Jean-Pied-de-Port | X | | | | | | | |
| 660 306 | Connection of Aïtachouria | | | | X | | X | | |
| 661 000 | Ossès-Saint-Martin-d'Arrossa to Saint-Étienne-de-Baïgorry | | | | | | | | |
| 661 000 | from Ossès-St-Martin-d'Arrossa to Eyheralde (PK 243,345) | X | | | | | | | |
| 661 000 | from Eyheralde to Saint-Étienne-de-Baïgorry | | | X | | | | | |
| 662 000 | Puyoô to Mauléon | | | | X | | X | | |
| 663 000 | Autevielle to Saint-Palais | | | | X | | X | | |
| 664 000 | Pau to Canfranc (frontier) | | | | | | | | |
| 664 000 | from Pau to Bedous (PK 275,413) | X | | | | | | | |
| 664 000 | from Bedous to Canfranc | | X | | | | | | |
| 665 000 | Buzy to Laruns-Eaux-Bonnes-Les Eaux-Chaudes | | | | | | | | |
| 665 000 | from Buzy to Arudy (PK 241,223) | | | X | | | X | | |
| 665 000 | from Arudy to Laruns-Eaux-Bonnes-Les Eaux-Chaudes | | | | X | | X | | |
| 666 000 | Lourdes to Pierrefitte-Nestalas | | | | X | | X | | |
| 667 000 | Lannemezan to Arreau-Cadéac | | | | | | | | |
| 667 000 | from Lannemezan to La Barthe-Avezac (PK 125,205) | X | | | | | | | |
| 667 000 | from La Barthe-Avezac to Sarrancolin (PK 139,900) | | | X | | | | | |
| 667 000 | from Sarrancolin to Arreau-Cadéac | | | | X | | X | | |
| 668 000 | Montréjeau-Gourdan-Polignan to Luchon | | | X | | | | | |
| 669 000 | Villefranche-Vernet-les-Bains to Latour-de-Carol (1 m) | X | | | | | | | |
| 670 000 | Boussens to Saint-Girons | | | | X | | X | | |
| 671 000 | Foix to Saint-Girons | | | | X | | X | | |
| 672 000 | Portet-Saint-Simon to Puigcerda (frontier) | X | | | | | | | |
| 673 000 | Pamiers to Limoux | | | | X | | X | | |
| 674 000 | Moulin-Neuf to Lavelanet | | | | X | | X | | |
| 675 000 | Bram to Belvèze | | | | X | | X | | |
| 676 000 | Carcassonne to Rivesaltes | | | | | | | | |
| 676 000 | from Carcassonne to Limoux (PK 373,595) | X | | | | | | | |
| 676 000 | from Limoux to Quillan (PK 402,000) | | X | | | | | | |
| 676 000 | from Quillan to Saint-Martin-Lys (PK 409,600) | | | | X | | X | | |
| 676 000 | from Saint-Martin-Lys to Caudiès (PK 425,729) | | | X | | | | | TPCF tourism operation... |
| 676 000 | from Caudiès to Rivesaltes | X | | | | | | | ... and Régiorail Languedoc-Roussillon between Axat and Rivesaltes. |
| 677 000 | Narbonne to Port-Bou (frontier) | X | | | | | | | |
| 679 000 | Perpignan to Villefranche-Vernet-les-Bains | X | | | | | | | |
| 680 000 | Elne to Arles-sur-Tech | | | | | | | | |
| 680 000 | from Elne to Saint-Jean-Pla-de-Corts (PK 501,214) | X | | | | | | | |
| 680 000 | from Saint-Jean-Pla-de-Corts to PK 502,215 | | X | | | | | | |
| 680 000 | from PK 502,215 to Céret (PK 504,800) | | | X | | | | | |
| 680 000 | from Céret to Arles-sur-Tech | | | | X | | X | | |
| 681 000 | La Guerche-sur-l'Aubois to Marseille-lès-Aubigny | X | | | | | | | |
| 682 000 | Auxy-Juranville to Bourges | | | | | | | | |
| 682 000 | from Auxy-Juranville to Bordes (PK 41,530) | | | | X | | X | | |
| 682 000 | from Bordes to Aubigny-sur-Nère (PK 85,303) | | | X | | | | | |
| 682 000 | from Aubigny-sur-Nère to Asnières-lès-Bourges (PK 129,850) | | | | X | | X | | |
| 682 000 | from Asnières-lès-Bourges to Bourges | X | | | | | | | |
| 683 000 | Aubrais-Orléans to Malesherbes | | | | | | | | |
| 683 000 | from Aubrais-Orléans to Pithiviers (PK 159,751) | X | | | | | | | |
| 683 000 | from Pithiviers to Malesherbes | | X | | | | | | |
| 684 000 | Étampes to Beaune-la-Rolande | | | | | | | | |
| 684 000 | from Étampes to Saint-Martin-from Étampes (PK 57,919) | X | | | | | | | |
| 684 000 | from Saint-Martin-from Étampes to Sermaises-du-Loiret (PK 79,109) | | | X | | | | | |
| 684 000 | from Sermaises-du-Loiret to Engenville (PK 85,900) | | | X | | | X | | |
| 684 000 | from Engenville to Pithiviers (PK 95,789) | X | | | | | | | |
| 684 000 | from Pithiviers to Beaune-la-Rolande | | X | | | | | | |
| 685 000 | Gien to Argent | | | | | | | | |
| 685 000 | from Gien to Poilly-lez-Gien (PK 8,700) | X | | | | | | | |
| 685 000 | from Poilly-lez-Gien to Argent | | | | X | | X | | |
| 686 000 | Aubrais-Orléans to Montargis | | | | | | | | |
| 686 000 | from Aubrais-Orléans to Marigny-les-Usages (PK 125,820) | X | | | | | | | |
| 686 000 | from Marigny-les-Usages to PK 127,750 | | X | | | | | | |
| 686 000 | from PK 127,750 to Boiscommun-Nibelle (PK 158,000) | | | X | | | | | |
| 686 000 | from Boiscommun-Nibelle to Bellegarde-Quiers (PK 164,234) | | | | X | | X | | |
| 686 000 | from Bellegarde-Quiers to Montargis | | X | | | | | | |
| 687 000 | Orléans to Gien | | | | | | | | |
| 687 000 | from Orléans to Bordes (PK 161,942) | X | | | | | | | |
| 687 000 | from Bordes to Nevoy (PK 181,900) | | | | X | | X | | |
| 687 000 | from Nevoy to Gien | X | | | | | | | |
| 689 000 | Saint-Germain-du-Puy to Cosne-Cours-sur-Loire | | | | | | | | |
| 689 000 | from Saint-Germain-du-Puy to Maubranche (PK 241,850) | X | | | | | | | |
| 689 000 | from Maubranche to Aix-d'Angillon (PK 254,812) | | | | | X | | | |
| 689 000 | from Aix-d'Angillon to Saint-Satur (PK 289,696) | | | | X | | X | | |
| 689 000 | from Saint-Satur to Cosne-Cours-sur-Loire | | X | | | | | | |
| 690 000 | Vierzon to Saincaize | X | | | | | | | |
| 691 000 | Saint-Florent-sur-Cher to Issoudun | | | | X | | X | | |
| 692 100 | Saint-Satur to Saint-Satur-Gare-d'Eau | | | X | | | | | |
| 693 000 | Salbris to Argent (1 m) | | | | X | | X | | Former BA line. |
| 695 000 | Bourges to Miécaze | | | | | | | | |
| 695 000 | from Bourges to Montluçon (PK 328,403) | X | | | | | | | |
| 695 000 | from Montluçon to Eygurande-Merlines (PK 420,662) | | X | | | | | | |
| 695 000 | from Eygurande-Merlines to Bort-les-Orgues (PK 454,121) | | | | X | | X | | |
| 695 000 | from Bort-les-Orgues to PK 459,0004 | | | | | X | | | |
| 695 000 | from PK 459,0004 to Mauriac (PK 495,415) | | | | X | | X | | |
| 695 000 | from Mauriac to Miécaze | | | X | | | | | |
| 696 000 | Châteauroux to La Ville-Gozet | | | | | | | | |
| 696 000 | from Châteauroux to PK 265,794 | X | | | | | | | |
| 696 000 | from PK 265,794 to La Châtre (PK 299,324) | | | X | | | | | |
| 696 000 | from La Châtre to La Ville-Gozet | | | | X | | X | | |
| 697 000 | Argenton-sur-Creuse to La Chaussée | | | | X | | X | | |
| 698 000 | La Châtre to Guéret | | | | | | | | |
| 698 000 | from La Châtre to PK 300,347 | | X | | | | | | |
| 698 000 | from PK 300,347 to Guéret (PK 371,952) | | | | X | | X | | |
| 698 000 | inside Guéret (PK 371,952 to 372,034) | | | X | | | | | |
| 699 000 | Champillet-Urciers to Lavaufranche | | | | | | | | |
| 699 000 | from Champillet-Urciers to Boussac (PK 342,707) | | | | X | | X | | |
| 699 000 | from Boussac to Lavaufranche | | | X | | | | | |
| 701 000 | Capdenac to Rodez | X | | | | | | | |
| 702 000 | Montluçon to Saint-Sulpice-Laurière | X | | | | | | | |
| 703 000 | Vieilleville to Bourganeuf | | X | | | | | | |
| 704 000 | Saint-Sébastien to Guéret | | | | | | | | |
| 704 000 | from Saint-Sébastien to Guéret (PK 365,700) | | | | X | | X | | |
| 704 000 | inside Guéret (PK 365,700 to 368,038) | X | | | | | | | |
| 705 000 | Montluçon to Moulins | | | | | | | | |
| 705 000 | from Montluçon to Commentary (PK 341,510) | X | | | | | | | |
| 705 000 | from Commentary to Moulins | | X | | | | | | |
| 706 000 | Doyet-la-Presle to Bézenet-Orléans | | | | X | | X | | |
| 707 000 | Commentary to Gannat | X | | | | | | | |
| 708 000 | Montluçon to Gouttières | | | | X | | X | | |
| 709 000 | Lapeyrouse to Volvic | | X | | | | | | |
| 710 000 | Laqueuille to Mont-Dore | | | | | | | | |
| 710 000 | from Laqueuille to Mont-Dore (PK 453,752) | X | | | | | | | |
| 710 000 | inside Le Mont-Dore (PK 453,752 to 456,788) | | X | | | | | | |
| 711 000 | Eygurande-Merlines to Clermont-Ferrand | | | | | | | | |
| 711 000 | from Eygurande-Merlines to Laqueuille (PK 442,278) | | X | | | | | | |
| 711 000 | from Laqueuille to Clermont-Ferrand | X | | | | | | | |
| 712 000 | Busseau-sur-Creuse to Ussel | | | | | | | | |
| 712 000 | from Busseau-sur-Creuse to Felletin (PK 423,650) | X | | | | | | | |
| 712 000 | from Felletin to La Courtine (PK 447,900) | | | | X | | X | | |
| 712 000 | from La Courtine to Ussel | | | X | | | | | |
| 713 000 | Palais to Eygurande-Merlines | | | | | | | | |
| 713 000 | from Palais to Ussel (PK 496,891) | X | | | | | | | |
| 713 000 | from Ussel to Eygurande-Merlines | | X | | | | | | |
| 714 000 | Uzerche to Tulle (1 m) | | | | X | | X | | Former POC line. |
| 715 000 | Seilhac to Treignac (1 m) | | | | X | | X | | Former POC line. |
| 716 000 | Tulle to Meymac | X | | | | | | | |
| 717 000 | Tulle to Argentat (1 m) | | | | X | | X | | Former POC line. |
| 718 000 | Brive-la-Gaillarde to Toulouse-Matabiau via Capdenac | X | | | | | | | |
| 719 000 | Souillac to Viescamp-sous-Jallès | | | | | | | | |
| 719 000 | from Souillac to Saint-Denis-près-Martel (PK 637,507) | | | | X | | | | From Martel to Saint-Denis-près-Martel, operated as a tourist attraction by CFTHQ. |
| 719 000 | from Saint-Denis-près-Martel to Viescamp-sous-Jallès | X | | | | | | | |
| 720 000 | Figeac to Arvant | X | | | | | | | |
| 721 000 | Bort-les-Orgues to Neussargues | | X | | | | | | From Riom-ès-Montagnes to Allanche, operated as a tourist attraction by CFHA. |
| 722 000 | Béziers to Neussargues | X | | | | | | | |
| 723 000 | Monastier to La Bastide-Saint-Laurent-les-Bains | X | | | | | | | |
| 724 000 | Cahors to Capdenac | | | X | | | | | |
| 725 000 | Sévérac-le-Château to Rodez | | | X | | | | | |
| 726 000 | Bertholène to Espalion | | | | X | | X | | |
| 727 000 | Tournemire-Roquefort to Vigan | | | | X | | X | | On the section renovated by the Army, between Tournemire and l'Hospitalet-du-Larzac, operated as a tourist attraction between La Bastide-Pradines and l'Hospitalet by Vélorail du Larzac. |
| 728 000 | Tournemire-Roquefort to Saint-Affrique | | | | X | | X | | |
| 729 000 | La Tour-sur-Orb to Plaisance-Andabre | | | | X | | X | | |
| 730 000 | Faugères to Paulhan | | | X | | | X | | |
| 731 000 | Sète-Ville to Montbazin-Gigean | | | X | | | X | | |
| 731 100 | Balaruc-les-Bains to Mèze | | | X | | | X | | |
| 732 000 | Vias to Lodève | | | | | | | | |
| 732 000 | from Vias to Lézignan-La-Cèbe (PK 472,400) | | X | | | | | | |
| 732 000 | from Lézignan-La-Cèbe to Lodève | | | X | | | X | | |
| 733 000 | Colombiers to Quarante-Cruzy | | | | | | | | |
| 733 000 | from Colombiers to Capestang (PK 433,600) | | X | | | | | | |
| 733 000 | from Capestang to Quarante-Cruzy | | | | X | | X | | |
| 734 000 | Narbonne to Bize | | | | | | | | |
| 734 000 | from Narbonne to Mirepeisset-Argeliers (PK 422,550) | X | | | | | | | |
| 734 000 | from Mirepeisset-Argeliers to Bize | | X | | | | | | |
| 735 000 | Moux to Caunes-Minervois | | | | X | | X | | |
| 736 000 | Castelnaudary to Rodez | | | | | | | | |
| 736 000 | from Castelnaudary to Revel-Sorèze (PK 337,730) | | | X | | | | | |
| 736 000 | from Revel-Sorèze to La Crémade (PK 358,710) | | | | X | | X | | |
| 736 000 | from La Crémade to Castres (PK 366,560) | X | | | | | | | |
| 736 000 | from Castres to Labastide-Dénat (PK 408,300) | | | | X | | X | | |
| 736 000 | from Labastide-Dénat to Albi-Ville (PK 412,500) | | | X | | | | | |
| 736 000 | fromAlbi-Ville to Rodez | X | | | | | | | |
| 737 000 | Castres to Bédarieux | | | | | | | | |
| 737 000 | from Castres to Mazamet (PK 385,470) | X | | | | | | | |
| 737 000 | from Mazamet to Bédarieux | | | | X | | X | | |
| 738 000 | Montauban-Ville-Bourbon to La Crémade | | | | | | | | |
| 738 000 | from Montauban-Ville-Bourbon to PK 207,680 | X | | | | | | | |
| 738 000 | from PK 207,680 to PK 209,000 | | X | | | | | | |
| 738 000 | from PK 209,000 to Saint-Sulpice (PK 248,120) | | | | X | | X | | |
| 738 000 | from Saint-Sulpice to La Crémade | X | | | | | | | |
| 739 000 | Lexos to Montauban-Ville-Bourbon | | | | X | | X | | |
| 741 000 | Tessonnières to Albi | X | | | | | | | |
| 742 000 | Albi to Saint-Juéry | | | X | | | | | |
| 743 000 | Viviez to Decazeville | | | | X | | X | | |
| 744 000 | Carmaux to Vindrac | | | | X | | X | | |

=== Southeast region ===
Legend: (1) Line in operation; (2) Line neutralized; (3) Line closed; (4) Line decommissioned; (5) Line cut-off; (6) Line filed; (7) Line in planning (situation as of July 24, 2019).

| N° | Railway Name | (1) | (2) | (3) | (4) | (5) | (6) | (7) | Observations |
|---|---|---|---|---|---|---|---|---|---|
| 694 000 | Paulhan to Montpellier | | | | | | | | |
| 694 000 | from Paulhan to Campagnan (PK 480,100) | | X | | | | | | |
| 694 000 | from Campagnan to Villeveyrac (PK 491,600) | | | X | | | | | |
| 694 000 | from Villeveyrac to Montbazin-Gigean (PK 500,870) | | X | | | | | | |
| 694 000 | from Montbazin-Gigean to Montpellier | | | X | | | | | At Saint-Jean-de-Védas, part of the line is used by TAM to build line 2 of the Montpellier tramway. |
| 745 000 | Villeneuve-Saint-Georges to Montargis | | | | | | | | |
| 745 000 | from Villeneuve-Saint-Georges to Malesherbes (PK 80,074) | X | | | | | | | |
| 745 000 | from Malesherbes to Auxy-Juranville (PK 100,025) | | X | | | | | | |
| 745 000 | from Auxy-Juranville to Montargis | X | | | | | | | |
| 746 000 | Corbeil-Essonnes to Montereau | X | | | | | | | |
| 747 000 | Bourron-Marlotte-Grez to Malesherbes | | | | | | | | |
| 747 000 | from Bourron-Marlotte-Grez to La Chapelle-la-Reine (PK 8,445) | | X | | | | | | |
| 747 000 | from La Chapelle-la-Reine to Malesherbes | X | | | | | | | |
| 748 000 | Montargis to Sens | | | | | | | | |
| 748 000 | from Montargis to Triguères (PK 140,550) | X | | | | | | | |
| 748 000 | from Triguères to Courtenay (PK 152,670) | | | | X | | | | |
| 748 000 | from Courtenay to Sens | | X | | | | | | |
| 749 000 | Triguères to Surgy | | | | | | | | |
| 749 000 | from Triguères to Charny (PK 155,050) | | X | | | | | | |
| 749 000 | from Charny to Fontenoy (PK 188,324) | | | | X | | | | TTPPF operates the section as a tourist attraction. |
| 749 000 | from Fontenoy to Surgy | | | | X | | X | | |
| 750 000 | Moret-Veneux-les-Sablons to Lyon-Perrache | X | | | | | | | |
| 751 000 | Auxerre-Saint-Gervais to Gien | | | | | | | | |
| 751 000 | from Auxerre-Saint-Gervais to Toucy-Moulins (PK 29,272) | | | | X | | X | | |
| 751 000 | from Toucy-Moulins to Saint-Fargeau (PK 54,731) | | | | X | | | | TTPPF operates the section as a tourist attraction. |
| 751 000 | from Saint-Fargeau to Arrabloy (PK 90,800) | | | | X | | X | | |
| 751 000 | from Arrabloy to Gien | X | | | | | | | |
| 752 000 | Combs-la-Ville to Saint-Louis (LGV) | X | | | | | | | |
| 752 100 | Villeneuve-Saint-Georges to the Moisenay bifurcation (LGV) | X | | | | | | | |
| 752 308 | Connection of Coubert (LGV) | X | | | | | | | |
| 753 000 | Laroche-Migennes to Cosne | | | | | | | | |
| 753 000 | from Laroche-Migennes to Étais (PK 244,800) | X | | | | | | | |
| 753 000 | from Étais to Entrains (PK 252,200) | | X | | | | | | |
| 753 000 | from Entrains to Cosne | | | | X | | X | | |
| 754 000 | Clamecy to Nevers | | | | | | | | |
| 754 000 | from Clamecy to Arzembouy (PK 259,031) | | X | | | | | | |
| 754 000 | from Arzembouy to Nevers | X | | | | | | | |
| 755 000 | Cravant-Bazarnes to Dracy-Saint-Loup | | | | | | | | |
| 755 000 | from Cravant-Bazarnes to Avallon (PK 229,300) | X | | | | | | | |
| 755 000 | from Avallon to Dracy-Saint-Loup | | X | | | | | | |
| 756 000 | Avallon to Nuits-sous-Ravières | | | | X | | X | | |
| 757 000 | Maison-Dieu to Laumes-Alésia | | | | | | | | |
| 757 000 | from Maison-Dieu to Époisses (PK 249,350) | | | | X | | X | | |
| 757 000 | from Époisses to Laumes-Alésia | | X | | | | | | |
| 760 000 | Netowards to Chagny | X | | | | | | | |
| 761 000 | Étang to Santenay (via Autun) | | | | | | | | |
| 761 000 | from Étang to Autun (PK 15,500) | X | | | | | | | |
| 761 000 | from Autun to Dracy-Saint-Loup (PK 22,374) | | X | | | | | | |
| 761 000 | from Dracy-Saint-Loup to Santenay | | | | X | | X | | |
| 762 000 | Clamecy to Gilly-sur-Loire | | | | | | | | |
| 762 000 | from Clamecy to Cercy-la-Tour (PK 310,459) | X | | | | | | | |
| 762 000 | from Cercy-la-Tour to Gilly-sur-Loire | | | | X | | X | | |
| 763 000 | Tamnay-Châtillon to Château-Chinon | | X | | | | | | |
| 764 000 | Saint-Florentin-Vergigny to Monéteau-Gurgy | | | | | | | | |
| 764 000 | from Saint-Florentin-Vergigny to PK 4,220 | | X | | | | | | |
| 764 000 | from PK 4,220 to Pontigny (PK 12,240) | | | | | X | | | |
| 764 000 | from Pontigny to Monéteau-Gurgy | | | | X | | X | | |
| 765 000 | Épinac to Pouillenay | | | | X | | X | | |
| 766 000 | Dijon-Ville to Épinac | | | | X | | X | | From Pont-d'Ouche to Bligny-sur-Ouche, the platform has been taken over by CFVO for tourist use. |
| 768 300 | Connection of Pasilly to Aisy | X | | | | | | | |
| 769 000 | Coteau to Montchanin | | | | | | | | |
| 769 000 | from Coteau to Pouilly-sous-Charlieu (PK 18,733) | | | X | | | | | |
| 769 000 | from Pouilly-sous-Charlieu to Paray-le-Monial (PK 59,095) | | | | X | | X | | |
| 769 000 | from Paray-le-Monial to Montchanin | X | | | | | | | |
| 770 000 | Moulins to Mâcon | | | | | | | | |
| 770 000 | from Moulins to Paray-le-Monial (PK 66,956) | X | | | | | | | |
| 770 000 | from Paray-le-Monial to Mâcon | | | | X | | X | | |
| 771 000 | Étiveau to Montchanin | | | | X | | X | | |
| 772 000 | Cluny to Chalon-sur-Saône | | | | X | | X | | |
| 774 000 | Pouilly-sous-Charlieu to Clermain | | | | | | | | |
| 774 000 | from Pouilly-sous-Charlieu to Charlieu (PK 5,250) | | | X | | | | | |
| 774 000 | inside Charlieu (PK 5,250 to 5,900) | | | | | X | | | |
| 774 000 | from Charlieu to Clermain | | | | X | | X | | |
| 775 000 | Paray-le-Monial to Givors-Canal | X | | | | | | | |
| 776 000 | Belleville to Beaujeu | | | | X | | X | | |
| 780 000 | Saint-Étienne-La-Terrasse to Saint-Étienne-Pont-de-l' ne | | | | | | | | |
| 780 000 | from Saint-Étienne-La-Terrasse to PK 0,470 | | | | | X | X | | |
| 780 000 | from PK 0,470 to PK 2,155 | | | X | | | | | |
| 780 000 | from PK 2,155 to Saint-Étienne-Pont-de-l' ne | X | | | | | | | |
| 782 000 | Lyon-Saint-Paul to Montbrison | | | | | | | | |
| 782 000 | from Lyon-Saint-Paul to Sainte-Foy-l'Argentière (PK 42,398) | X | | | | | | | CFTB operates the section from l'Arbresle to Sainte-Foy-l'Argentière as a tourist attraction. |
| 782 000 | from Sainte-Foy-l'Argentière to Montrond-les-Bains (PK 63,290) | | | | X | | X | | The section between Bellegarde-en-Forez and Montrond-les-Bains has been restored to serve the I.T.E. des Carrières from la Loire. |
| 782 000 | from Montrond-les-Bains to Boisset-le-Cerizet (PK 67,354) | | | | | X | X | | |
| 782 000 | from Boisset-le-Cerizet to Montbrison | | | | X | | X | | |
| 783 000 | Coteau to Saint-Germain-au-Mont-d'Or | X | | | | | | | |
| 784 000 | Clermont-Ferrand to Saint-Just-sur-Loire | | | | | | | | |
| 784 000 | from Clermont-Ferrand to Thiers (PK 46,797) | X | | | | | | | |
| 784 000 | from Thiers to Boën (PK 93,300) | | X | | | | | | |
| 784 000 | from Boën to Saint-Just-sur-Loire | X | | | | | | | |
| 785 000 | Saint-Germain-des-Fossés to Darsac | | | | | | | | |
| 785 000 | from Saint-Germain-des-Fossés to Puy-Guillaume (PK 386,400) | X | | | | | | | |
| 785 000 | from Puy-Guillaume to Pont-de-Dore (PK 400,600) | | | | X | | X | | |
| 785 000 | from Pont-de-Dore to Arlanc (PK 464,580) | | | X | | | | | Section operated by AGRIVAP. |
| 785 000 | from Arlanc to Sembadel (PK 493,960) | | | | X | | | | Section run by AGRIVAP for tourism purposes. |
| 785 000 | from Sembadel to Darsac | | | | X | | X | | |
| 786 000 | Vichy to Cusset | X | | | | | | | |
| 787 000 | Vichy to Riom | X | | | | | | | |
| 789 000 | La Ferté-Hauterive to Gannat | | | | | | | | |
| 789 000 | from La Ferté-Hauterive to Saint-Pourçain-sur-Sioule (PK 341,820) | X | | | | | | | |
| 789 000 | inside Saint-Pourçain-sur-Sioule (PK 341,820 to 343,430) | | X | | | | | | |
| 789 000 | from Saint-Pourçain-sur-Sioule to Bayet (PK 349,000) | | | | X | | X | | |
| 789 000 | from Bayet to Gannat | | X | | | | | | |
| 790 000 | Saint-Germain-des-Fossés to Nîmes-Courbessac | X | | | | | | | |
| 791 000 | Brives-Charensac au Monastier | | | | | | | | |
| 791 000 | from Brives-Charensac to Présailles | | | | X | | | | Section where the platform has been built but the track has never been laid. |
| 791 000 | from Présailles to Lalevade-d'Ardèche | | | | | | | | Unfinished section. |
| 792 000 | Puy to Langogne | | | | | | | | |
| 792 000 | fromPuy to Landos (PK 35,518) | | | | X | | X | | |
| 792 000 | from Landos to Langogne (PK 50,800) | | | | X | | | | Section operated by velorail for tourist purposes. |
| 792 000 | inside Langogne (PK 50,800 to 53,471) | | X | | | | | | |
| 793 000 | Riom to Châtelguyon | | | | | | | | |
| 793 000 | from Riom to Mozac (PK 409,930) | | | X | | | | | |
| 793 000 | from Mozac to Châtelguyon | | | | X | | X | | |
| 793 606 | ZI de Volvic main line to Riom | X | | | | | | | |
| 794 000 | Beaumont-Loriat to Saint-Flour | | | | X | | X | | |
| 795 000 | Bonson to Sembadel | | | | | | | | |
| 795 000 | from Bonson to Estivareilles (PK 31,150) | | | | X | | X | | |
| 795 000 | from Estivareilles to Sembadel | | | | X | | | | Section operated as a tourist attraction by the CFHF. |
| 796 000 | Saint-Just-sur-Loire to Fraisses-Unieux | | | | | | | | |
| 796 000 | from Saint-Just-sur-Loire to Saint-Just-Saint-Rambert (PK 1,900) | X | | | | | | | |
| 796 000 | from Saint-Just-Saint-Rambert to Fraisses-Unieux | | | | X | | X | | |
| 797 000 | Firminy to Saint-Rambert-d'Albon | | | | | | | | |
| 797 000 | from Firminy to Dunières (PK 27,800) | X | | | | | | | |
| 797 000 | from Dunières to Peyraud (PK 81,000) | | | | X | | X | | |
| 797 000 | from Peyraud to Saint-Rambert-d'Albon | X | | | | | | | |
| 798 000 | Saint-Georges-d'Aurac to Saint-Étienne-Châteaucreux | X | | | | | | | |
| 799 000 | Saint-Étienne-le-Clapier to La Béraudière | | | | X | | X | | |
| 800 000 | Givors-Canal to Grezan | X | | | | | | | |
| 804 000 | Pouzin to Privas | | | | X | | X | | |
| 805 000 | Teil to Alès | | | | | | | | |
| 805 000 | from Teil to Aubignas-Alba (PK 674,460) | | X | | | | | | |
| 805 000 | from Aubignas-Alba to Villeneuve-de-Berg (PK 687,563) | | | | X | | | | |
| 805 000 | from Villeneuve-de-Berg to Robiac (PK 736,249) | | | | X | | X | | |
| 805 000 | from Robiac to Salindres (PK 755,250) | | X | | | | | | |
| 805 000 | from Salindres to Alès | X | | | | | | | |
| 806 000 | Vogüé to Lalevade-d'Ardèche | | | | X | | X | | |
| 807 000 | Saint-Sernin to Largentière | | | | X | | X | | |
| 808 000 | Bessèges to Robiac | | X | | | | | | |
| 809 000 | La Valette to Robiac | | | | X | | X | | |
| 810 000 | Tarascon to Sète-Ville | X | | | | | | | |
| 811 000 | La Peyrade-Bifurcation to Sète-Méditerranée | X | | | | | | | |
| 812 000 | Alès to Port-l'Ardoise | | | | | | | | |
| 812 000 | from Alès to Laudun-Saint-Victor (PK 52,018) | | | | X | | X | | |
| 812 000 | from Laudun-Saint-Victor to Port-l'Ardoise (PK 57,257) | | | X | | | | | |
| 812 000 | inside Port-l'Ardoise (PK 57,257 to 58,018) | X | | | | | | | |
| 813 000 | Martinet to Beaucaire | | | | | | | | |
| 813 000 | fromMartinet to Saint-Florent-sur-Auzonnet (PK 2,500) | | | | X | | X | | |
| 813 000 | fromMartinet to Saint-Julien-les Fumades (PK 10,204) | | | X | | | | | |
| 813 000 | from Saint-Julien-les Fumades to Vers-Pont-du-Gard (PK 61,911) | | | | X | | X | | |
| 813 000 | from Vers-Pont-du-Gard to Remoulins (PK 67,559) | X | | | | | | | |
| 813 000 | from Remoulins to Sernhac (PK 69,180) | | X | | | | | | |
| 813 000 | from Sernhac to Beaucaire (PK 85,317) | | | | X | | X | | |
| 813 000 | inside Beaucaire | | | | | X | | | |
| 814 000 | Mas-des-Gardies to Mazes-le-Crès | | | | | | | | |
| 814 000 | from Mas-des-Gardies to Castries (PK 740,870) | | | | X | | X | | |
| 814 000 | from Castries to Vendargues (PK 742,930) | | | X | | | X | | |
| 814 000 | from Vendargues to Mazes-le-Crès | | X | | | | | | |
| 815 000 | Lézan to Saint-Jean-du-Gard | | | | | | | | |
| 815 000 | from Lézan to Anduze (PK 697,710) | | | | X | | X | | |
| 815 000 | from Anduze to Saint-Jean-du-Gard | | | | X | | | | Section operated by CITEV for tourism purposes. |
| 816 000 | Vigan to Quissac | | | | X | | X | | |
| 817 000 | Sommières to Saint-Césaire | | | | | | | | |
| 817 000 | from Sommières to PK 83,391 | | | | X | | X | | |
| 817 000 | from PK 83,391 to Saint-Césaire | | | X | | | X | | |
| 818 000 | Sommières to Gallargues | | | | X | | X | | |
| 819 000 | Saint-Césaire to Grau-du-Roi | X | | | | | | | |
| 820 000 | Arles to Lunel | | | | | | | | |
| 820 000 | from Arles to Arles-Trinquetaille (PK 1,414) | | | | X | | X | | |
| 820 000 | from Arles-Trinquetaille to Cailar (PK 35,797) | | X | | | | | | |
| 820 000 | fromCailar to Aimargues (PK 38,645) | X | | | | | | | |
| 820 000 | from Aimargues to Marsillargues (PK 40,930) | | | | X | | X | | |
| 820 000 | from Marsillargues to Lunel | | | X | | | X | | |
| 821 000 | Arles to Port-Saint-Louis-du-Rhône | | | | | | | | |
| 821 000 | from Arles to PK 3,900 | | X | | | | | | |
| 821 000 | from PK 3,900 to PK 34,700 | | | | X | | X | | |
| 821 000 | from PK 34,700 to Port-Saint-Louis-du-Rhône | X | | | | | | | |
| 823 000 | Uzès to Nozières-Brignon | | | | X | | X | | |
| 824 000 | Villeneuve-lès-Avignon to Avignon | X | | | | | | | |
| 830 000 | Paris-Lyon to Marseille-Saint-Charles | X | | | | | | | |
| 830 359 | Virgule d'Avignon Courtine | X | | | | | | | |
| 831 000 | Flamboin-Gouaix to Montereau | X | | | | | | | |
| 832 000 | Saint-Julien (Troyes) to Saint-Florentin-Vergigny | | | | | | | | |
| 832 000 | from Saint-Julien to Roncenay-Bouilly (PK 179,600) | X | | | | | | | |
| 832 000 | from Roncenay-Bouilly to Saint-Florentin-Vergigny | | X | | | | | | |
| 834 000 | Angles to Lattes (LGV) | X | | | | | | | |
| 837 000 | Perpignan to Figueras (LGV) | X | | | | | | | Line owned and operated by Línea Figueras Perpignan SA. |
| 838 000 | Saint-Julien (Troyes) to Gray | | | | | | | | |
| 838 000 | from Saint-Julien to Polisot (PK 205,350) | X | | | | | | | |
| 838 000 | from Polisot to Sainte-Colombe-sur-Seine (PK 231,180) | | X | | | | | | |
| 838 000 | from Sainte-Colombe-sur-Seine to Châtillon-sur-Seine (PK 233,812) | X | | | | | | | |
| 838 000 | from Châtillon-sur-Seine to Is-sur-Tille (PK 305,119) | | X | | | | | | |
| 838 000 | inside Is-sur-Tille (PK 305,119 to 306,047) | X | | | | | | | |
| 838 000 | from Is-sur-Tille to Gray | | X | | | | | | |
| 839 000 | Nuits-sous-Ravières to Châtillon-sur-Seine | X | | | | | | | |
| 840 000 | Bricon to Châtillon-sur-Seine | | | | | | | | |
| 840 000 | from Bricon to Veuxhaulles (PK 23,400) | X | | | | | | | |
| 840 000 | from Veuxhaulles to Bissey-la-Côté (PK 32,920) | | X | | | | | | |
| 840 000 | from Bissey-la-Côté to Châtillon-sur-Seine | X | | | | | | | |
| 842 000 | Poinson-Beneuvre to Langres | | | | X | | X | | |
| 843 000 | Is-sur-Tille to Culmont-Chalindrey | X | | | | | | | |
| 846 000 | Culmont-Chalindrey to Gray | | X | | | | | | |
| 847 000 | Vaivre to Gray | | X | | | | | | |
| 849 000 | Dijon-Ville to Is-sur-Tille | X | | | | | | | |
| 850 000 | Dijon-Ville to Vallorbe (frontier) | X | | | | | | | |
| 851 000 | Gray to Saint-Jean-de-Losne | | | | | | | | |
| 851 000 | from Gray to Villers-les-Pots (PK 33,988) | X | | | | | | | |
| 851 000 | inside Villers-les-Pots (PK 33,988 to 40,144) | | X | | | | | | The chain turns back at Auxonne. |
| 851 000 | from Villers-les-Pots to PK 53,000 | | | X | | | X | | |
| 851 000 | from PK 53,000 to Saint-Jean-de-Losne | X | | | | | | | |
| 852 000 | Dole-Ville to Belfort | X | | | | | | | |
| 853 000 | Gray to Fraisans | | | | X | | X | | |
| 854 000 | Belfort to Delle | X | | | | | | | |
| 855 000 | Montagney to Miserey | | | | | | | | |
| 855 000 | from Montagney to PK 45,260 | | | | X | | X | | |
| 855 000 | from PK 45,260 to Miserey | | | | | X | X | | |
| 856 000 | Besançon-Viotte to Vesoul | | | | | | | | |
| 856 000 | from Besançon-Viotte to Devecey (PK 418,719) | X | | | | | | | |
| 856 000 | from Devecey to Loulans-les-Forges (PK 440,550) | | | | X | | X | | |
| 856 000 | from Loulans-les-Forges to Montbozon (PK 446,150) | | | | | X | X | | |
| 856 000 | from Montbozon to Vesoul | | | | X | | X | | |
| 857 000 | Montbozon to Lure | | | | | | | | |
| 857 000 | from Montbozon to Villersexel (PK 469,000) | | | | | X | X | | |
| 857 000 | from Villersexel to Lure | | | X | | | X | | |
| 858 000 | Montbéliard to Morvillars | | | | | | | | |
| 858 000 | from Montbéliard to Audincourt (PK 5,880) | | X | | | | | | |
| 858 000 | from Audincourt to Beaucourt (PK 11,800) | | | X | | | X | | |
| 858 000 | from Beaucourt to Morvillars | | | | X | | X | | |
| 859 000 | Voujeaucourt to Saint-Hippolyte | | | | | | | | |
| 859 000 | from Voujeaucourt to Pont-de-Roide (PK 16,000) | | X | | | | | | |
| 859 000 | from Pont-de-Roide to Saint-Hippolyte | | | | X | | X | | |
| 860 000 | Dijon-Ville to Saint-Amour | X | | | | | | | |
| 864 000 | Beaune to Saint-Loup-de-la-Salle | | | | X | | X | | |
| 865 000 | Chagny to Dole-Ville | | | | | | | | |
| 865 000 | from Chagny to PK 3,006 | X | | | | | | | |
| 865 000 | from PK 3,006 to Alleray (PK 23,913) | | | | X | | X | | |
| 865 000 | from Alleray to Verdun-sur-le-Doubs (PK 27,832) | X | | | | | | | |
| 865 000 | from Verdun-sur-le-Doubs to Saint-Bonnet-en-Bresse (PK 36,950) | | X | | | | | | |
| 865 000 | from Saint-Bonnet-en-Bresse to Tavaux (PK 71,850) | | | | X | | X | | |
| 865 000 | inside Tavaux (PK 71,850 to 73,307) | | | X | | | X | | |
| 865 000 | from Tavaux to Dole-Ville | X | | | | | | | |
| 867 000 | Seurre to Chalon-sur-Saône | | | | | | | | |
| 867 000 | from Seurre to Alleray (PK 87,273) | | | | X | | X | | |
| 867 000 | from Alleray to Chalon-sur-Saône | X | | | | | | | |
| 868 000 | Chaugey to Lons-le-Saunier | | | | | | | | |
| 868 000 | from Chaugey to Chemin-Peseux (PK 357,815) | X | | | | | | | |
| 868 000 | from Chemin-Peseux to Bletterans (PK 392,500) | | | | X | | X | | |
| 868 000 | from Bletterans to Lons-le-Saunier | | | X | | | X | | |
| 869 000 | Dole-Ville to Poligny | | | | | | | | |
| 869 000 | from Dole-Ville to Mont-sous-Vaudrey (PK 381,000) | | X | | | | | | |
| 869 000 | from Mont-sous-Vaudrey to Poligny | | | | X | | X | | |
| 870 000 | Mouchard to Salins-les-Bains | | | | X | | X | | |
| 871 000 | Franois to Arc-et-Senans | X | | | | | | | |
| 872 000 | Besançon-Viotte to Locle-Col-des-Roches | X | | | | | | | |
| 873 000 | L'Hôpital-du-Grosbois to Lods | | | | X | | X | | |
| 874 000 | Pontarlier to Gilley | | | | X | | X | | |
| 875 000 | Frasne to Verrières-de-Joux (frontier) | X | | | | | | | |
| 876 000 | Pontarlier to Vallorbe (frontier) | | | | X | | X | | From Fontaine-Ronde to Hopitaux-Neufs, a section recreated and operated by Coni'fer. |
| 878 000 | Andelot-en-Montagne to La Cluse | | | | | | | | |
| 878 000 | from Andelot-en-Montagne to Saint-Claude (PK 73,905) | X | | | | | | | |
| 878 000 | from Saint-Claude to Dortan-Lavancia (PK 96,338) | | X | | | | | | |
| 878 000 | from Dortan-Lavancia to Oyonnax (PK 103,869) | | | X | | | | | |
| 878 000 | from Oyonnax to La Cluse (PK 115,490) | X | | | | | | | |
| 878 000 | inside La Cluse (PK 115,490 to 116,170) | | | | X | | X | | |
| 879 000 | Champagnole to Lons-le-Saunier | | | | | | | | |
| 879 000 | from Champagnole to PK 41,600 | | | | X | | X | | |
| 879 000 | from PK 41,600 to Lons-le-Saunier | | | X | | | X | | |
| 880 000 | Mouchard to Bourg-en-Bresse | X | | | | | | | |
| 881 000 | Saint-Germain-du-Plain to Lons-le-Saunier | | | | X | | X | | |
| 882 000 | Chalon-sur-Saône to Bourg-en-Bresse | | | | | | | | |
| 882 000 | from Chalon-sur-Saône to PK 4,817 | X | | | | | | | |
| 882 000 | from PK 4,817 to Saint-Marcel-lès-Chalon (PK 5,510) | | X | | | | | | |
| 882 000 | from Saint-Marcel-lès-Chalon to Bourg-en-Bresse | | | X | | | X | | |
| 883 000 | Mâcon to Ambérieu | X | | | | | | | |
| 884 000 | Bourg-en-Bresse to Bellegarde | X | | | | | | | |
| 886 000 | Lyon-Saint-Clair to Bourg-en-Bresse | X | | | | | | | |
| 887 000 | Lyon-Croix-Rousse to Trévoux | | | | | | | | |
| 887 000 | from Lyon-Croix-Rousse to PK 4,250 | | | | X | | X | | |
| 887 000 | from PK 4,250 to Sathonay-Rillieux (PK 6,757) | | | X | | | X | | |
| 887 000 | from Sathonay-Rillieux to Neuville-sur-Saône (PK 16,753) | X | | | | | | | |
| 887 000 | from Neuville-sur-Saône to Trévoux (PK 24,800) | | X | | | | | | |
| 887 000 | inside Trévoux (PK 24,800 to 25,238) | | | X | | | X | | |
| 888 000 | Lyon-Gorge-de-Loup to Lyon-Vaise | X | | | | | | | |
| 889 000 | Ambérieu to Montalieu-Vercieu | | | | | | | | |
| 889 000 | from Ambérieu to Lagnieu (PK 6,800) | X | | | | | | | |
| 889 000 | from Lagnieu to Montalieu-Vercieu | | | | X | | X | | |
| 890 000 | Lyon-Perrache to Genève (frontier) | X | | | | | | | |
| 891 000 | Collonges-Fort-l'Écluse to Divonne-les-Bains (frontier) | | | X | | | | | |
| 892 000 | Longeray-Léaz to Bouveret | | | | | | | | |
| 892 000 | from Longeray-Léaz to Évian-les-Bains (PK 212,340) | X | | | | | | | |
| 892 000 | from Évian-les-Bains to Bouveret | | X | | | | | | |
| 893 000 | Collonges-Fontaines to Lyon-Guillotière | X | | | | | | | |
| 894 000 | Annemasse to Genève-Eaux-Vives (frontier) | | | X | | | X | | Line rebuilt and extended to Geneva-Cornavin as part of the CEVA project. |
| 895 000 | La Roche-sur-Foron to Saint-Gervais-les-Bains-Le Fayet | X | | | | | | | |
| 896 000 | Saint-Gervais-les-Bains-Le Fayet to Vallorcine (frontier) (1 m) | X | | | | | | | |
| 897 000 | Aix-les-Bains-Le Revard to Annemasse | X | | | | | | | |
| 898 000 | Annecy to Albertville | | | | | | | | |
| 898 000 | from Annecy to PK 31,205 | | | | X | | X | | |
| 898 000 | from PK 31,205 to Ugine (PK 35,771) | | X | | | | | | |
| 898 000 | from Ugine to Albertville | X | | | | | | | |
| 899 000 | Saint-Pierre-d'Albigny to Bourg-Saint-Maurice | X | | | | | | | |
| 900 000 | Culoz to Modane (frontier) | X | | | | | | | |
| 901 000 | Lyon-Part-Dieu to Montalieu-Vercieu | | | | X | | X | | Line formerly operated by CFEL; from Lyon-Part-Dieu to Meyzieu, the platform was taken over by TCL to establish line 3 of the Lyon tramway and the Rhônexpress. |
| 903 000 | Saint-André-le-Gaz to Chambéry | X | | | | | | | |
| 904 000 | Pressins to Virieu-le-Grand | | | | | | | | |
| 904 000 | from Pressins to Peyrieu (PK 96,737) | | | | X | | X | | |
| 904 000 | inside Peyrieu (PK 96,737 to 97,835) | | | X | | | | | |
| 904 000 | from Peyrieu to Virieu-le-Grand | X | | | | | | | |
| 905 000 | Lyon-Perrache to Marseille-Saint-Charles (via Grenoble) | X | | | | | | | |
| 906 000 | Givors-Canal to Chasse-sur-Rhône | X | | | | | | | |
| 907 000 | Saint-Rambert-d'Albon to Rives | | | | | | | | |
| 907 000 | from Saint-Rambert-d'Albon to Beaurepaire (PK 21,990) | X | | | | | | | |
| 907 000 | from Beaurepaire to Izeaux (PK 49,800) | | | X | | | | | |
| 907 000 | from Izeaux to Rives | | | | X | | | | |
| 908 000 | Valence to Moirans | X | | | | | | | |
| 909 000 | Grenoble to Montmélian | | | | | | | | |
| 909 000 | inside Grenoble (PK 1,963) | X | | | | | | | |
| 909 000 | inside Grenoble (PK 1,963 to 6,852) | | | | X | | X | | Section abandoned and replaced by the Grenoble bypass line. |
| 909 000 | from Grenoble to Montmélian | X | | | | | | | |
| 909 903 | Grenoble detour to Montmélian | X | | | | | | | |
| 912 000 | Livron to Aspres-sur-Buëch | X | | | | | | | |
| 913 000 | Livron to La Voulte | | | | | | | | |
| 913 000 | from Livron to La Voulte (PK 4,712) | X | | | | | | | |
| 913 000 | inside La Voulte (PK 4,712 to 5,914) | | | X | | | X | | |
| 914 000 | Pierrelatte to Nyons | | | | X | | X | | The Pierrelatte mother track is established on the first few kilometers of the line. |
| 915 000 | Veynes to Briançon | X | | | | | | | |
| 916 000 | Chorges to Barcelonnette | | | | X | | | | Unfinished line. |
| 920 000 | Saint-Auban to Digne | | | | | | | | |
| 920 000 | from Saint-Auban to PK 308,200 | X | | | | | | | |
| 920 000 | from PK 308,200 to Digne | | X | | | | | | |
| 921 000 | Forcalquier to Volx | | | | X | | X | | |
| 922 000 | Cavaillon to Saint-Maime-Dauphin | | | | X | | X | | |
| 923 000 | Cheval-Blanc to Pertuis | X | | | | | | | |
| 924 000 | Salon to La Calade-Éguilles | | | | X | | X | | |
| 925 000 | Avignon to Miramas | X | | | | | | | |
| 926 000 | Orange to l'Isle-Fontaine-de-Vaucluse | | | | | | | | |
| 926 000 | from Orange to Carpentras (PK 21,480) | | | | X | | X | | |
| 926 000 | inside Carpentras (PK 21,480 to 21,926) | X | | | | | | | |
| 926 000 | from Carpentras to Pernes (PK 28,390) | | | | | X | | | |
| 926 000 | from Pernes to l'Isle-Fontaine-de-Vaucluse | | | | X | | X | | |
| 927 000 | Sorgues-Châteauneuf-du-Pape to Carpentras | X | | | | | | | |
| 928 000 | Rognac to Aix-en-Provence | X | | | | | | | |
| 930 000 | Marseille-Saint-Charles to Vintimille (frontier) | X | | | | | | | |
| 931 000 | Orange to Buis-les-Baronnies | | | | X | | X | | |
| 935 000 | Miramas to L'Estaque | X | | | | | | | |
| 937 000 | Marseille-Blancarde to Marseille-Prado | | | | | | | | |
| 937 000 | from Marseille-Blancarde to La Capelette (PK 2,395) | X | | | | | | | |
| 937 000 | from La Capelette to Marseille-Prado | | | X | | | X | | |
| 938 000 | Marseille-Saint-Charles to Marseille-Joliette | | | | | | | | |
| 938 000 | from Marseille-Saint-Charles to the bif. of Lajout (PK 1,985) | X | | | | | | | |
| 938 000 | from the bif. of Lajout to Marseille-Joliette | | | | | X | X | | |
| 939 000 | L'Estaque to Marseille-Joliette | | | | | | | | |
| 939 000 | from L'Estaque to the bif. of Lajout (PK 858,850) | X | | | | | | | |
| 939 000 | from the bif. of Lajout to Marseille-Joliette | | | | | X | X | | |
| 939 001 | L'Estaque to Marseille-Saint-Charles | X | | | | | | | |
| 941 000 | Marseille-Prado to Marseille-Vieux-Port | | | | X | | X | | |
| 942 000 | La Pauline-Hyères aux Salins-d'Hyères | | | | | | | | |
| 942 000 | from La Pauline-Hyères to Hyères (PK 10,849) | X | | | | | | | |
| 942 000 | from Hyères to La Plage-d'Hyères (PK 14,360) | | X | | | | | | |
| 942 000 | from La Plage-d'Hyères to Salins-d'Hyères | | | | X | | X | | |
| 943 000 | Arcs to Draguignan | | | | | | | | |
| 943 000 | from Arcs to La Motte-Sainte-Roseline (PK 4,990) | X | | | | | | | |
| 943 000 | from La Motte-Sainte-Roseline to Draguignan | | | | X | | X | | |
| 944 000 | Cannes-la-Bocca to Grasse | X | | | | | | | |
| 945 000 | Nice to Breil-sur-Roya | X | | | | | | | |
| 946 000 | Coni to Vintimille | X | | | | | | | |
| 947 000 | Carnoules to Gardanne | | | | | | | | |
| 947 000 | from Carnoules to Peynier-Rousset (PK 64,300) | | X | | | | | | Des Platanes to Brignoles, a section operated by the ATTCV as a tourist attraction. |
| 947 000 | from Peynier-Rousset to Gardanne | X | | | | | | | |
| 948 000 | Aubagne to La Barque | | | | | | | | |
| 948 000 | from Aubagne to Valdonne-Peypin (PK 17,398) | | | X | | | | | |
| 948 000 | from Valdonne-Peypin to La Barque | | | | X | | X | | |

=== Île-de-France ===
Legend: (1) Line in operation; (2) Line neutralized; (3) Line closed; (4) Line decommissioned; (5) Line cut-off; (6) Line filed; (7) Line in planning (situation as of July 24, 2019).

| N° | Railway Name | (1) | (2) | (3) | (4) | (5) | (6) | (7) | Observations |
|---|---|---|---|---|---|---|---|---|---|
| 952 000 | La Plaine to Pantin | | | | | | | | |
| 952 000 | from La Plaine to PK 1,410 | | | X | | | | | |
| 952 000 | from PK 1,410 to PK 2,456 | | | | X | | | | |
| 952 000 | from PK 2,456 to Pantin | | | X | | | | | |
| 953 000 | Enghien-les-Bains to Montmorency | | | | X | | X | | |
| 955 000 | La Râpée to Batignolles (Chemin de fer de Petite Ceinture) | | | | | | | | |
| 955 000 | from La Râpée to Bel-Air-Ceinture (PK 21,020) | | | X | | | | | |
| 955 000 | from Bel-Air-Ceinture to Batignolles | X | | | | | | | |
| 956 000 | Paris-Bastille to Marles-en-Brie | | | | | | | | |
| 956 000 | from Paris-Bastille to Saint-Mandé (PK 4,210) | | | | X | | X | | |
| 956 000 | from Saint-Mandé to Boissy-Saint-Léger (PK 22,220) | | | | X | | | | Section owned and operated by RATP. |
| 956 000 | from Boissy-Saint-Léger to Yèbles-Guignes (PK 50,010) | | | | X | | X | | Between Limeil-Brévannes and Villecresnes, platform reused for construction of the line from Villeneuve-Saint-Georges to the Moisenay bifurcation (LGV), no. 752 100. |
| 956 000 | from Yèbles-Guignes to Verneuil-l'Étang (PK 54,320) | | X | | | | | | |
| 956 000 | from Verneuil-l'Étang to Marles-en-Brie | | | | X | | X | | |
| 957 000 | Bobigny to Sucy-Bonneuil | X | | | | | | | |
| 958 000 | Bondy to Aulnay-sous-Bois | X | | | | | | | Operated as line 4 of the Île-de-France tramway network. |
| 960 000 | Sartrouville to Noisy-le-Sec (Tangentielle Légère Nord) | X | | | | | | | Operated as line 11 Express of the Île-de-France tramway network. |
| 961 300 | Connection of Épinettes | | | X | | | X | | |
| 962 000 | Ermont-Eaubonne to Champ-de-Mars (VMI) | X | | | | | | | |
| 963 000 | La Plaine to Ermont-Eaubonne | | | | | | | | |
| 963 000 | from La Plaine to Saint-Ouen Les Docks (PK 6,327) | X | | | | | | | |
| 963 000 | from Saint-Ouen Les Docks to Ermont-Eaubonne | | | X | | | | | Section integrated into the Ermont-Eaubonne to Champ-de-Mars (VMI) line, no. 962,000. |
| 964 000 | Argenteuil to Ermont-Eaubonne | | | X | | | | | This line underwent major renovation work in 2006 to recreate a direct link from Paris to Ermont; it is now part of the Paris-Saint-Lazare to Ermont-Eaubonne line, no. 334 900. |
| 966 000 | Maisons-Laffitte to Champ-de-Courses | | | | X | | X | | |
| 970 000 | Avenue-Henri-Martin to Champ-de-Mars | | | X | | | | | Line integrated with the Ermont-Eaubonne to Champ-de-Mars (VMI) line, no. 962,000. |
| 971 000 | Pont-Cardinet to Auteuil – Boulogne | | | | | | | | |
| 971 000 | from Pont-Cardinet to Pereire-Levallois | | | X | | | X | | |
| 971 000 | from Pereire-Levallois to Avenue Henri-Martin | | | X | | | | | Section integrated into the Ermont-Eaubonne to Champ-de-Mars (VMI) line, no. 962,000. |
| 971 000 | from Avenue Henri-Martin to Auteuil-Boulogne | | | | X | | X | | |
| 972 000 | Puteaux to Issy-Plaine | | | | | X | X | | Platform reused by RATP to create line 2 of the Île-de-France tramway. |
| 973 000 | Paris-Saint-Lazare to Versailles-Rive-Droite | X | | | | | | | |
| 974 000 | Saint-Cloud to Saint-Nom-la-Bretèche-Forêt-de-Marly | X | | | | | | | |
| 975 000 | Paris-Saint-Lazare to Saint-Germain-en-Laye | | | | | | | | |
| 975 000 | from Paris-Saint-Lazare to Nanterre-Université (PK 10,911) | X | | | | | | | |
| 975 000 | from Nanterre-Université to Saint-Germain-en-Laye | | | | X | | | | Section owned and operated by RATP. |
| 975 900 | Nanterre-Université to Sartrouville | X | | | | | | | |
| 976 000 | Saint-Germain-Grande-Ceinture to Saint-Germain-en-Laye | | | | X | | X | | |
| 977 000 | Des Invalides to Versailles-Rive-Gauche | X | | | | | | | |
| 978 300 | Connection of Viroflay | X | | | | | | | |
| 979 000 | Paris-Est to Pont-Cardinet (EOLE) | X | | | | | | | |
| 980 000 | Auteuil-Boulogne to La Râpée (Chemin de fer de Petite Ceinture) | | | | | | | | |
| 980 000 | from Auteuil-Boulogne to Grenelle-Ceinture (PK 9,607) | | | X | | | X | | |
| 980 000 | from Grenelle-Ceinture to Vaugirard-Ceinture (PK 11,332) | X | | | | | | | |
| 980 000 | from Vaugirard-Ceinture to PK 18,617 | | X | | | | | | |
| 980 000 | from PK 18,617 to La Râpée | | | X | | | | | |
| 981 000 | Paris-Nord to Paris-Gare-de-Lyon (RER ligne D) | X | | | | | | | |
| 983 000 | Des Invalides to Quai-d'Orsay | X | | | | | | | |
| 984 000 | Quai-d'Orsay to Paris-Austerlitz | X | | | | | | | |
| 985 000 | Choisy-le-Roi to Massy-Verrières | X | | | | | | | |
| 988 000 | Grigny to Corbeil-Essonnes | X | | | | | | | |
| 990 000 | Chemin de fer de Petite Ceinture | | | | | | | | |
| 990 000 | from Versailles-Chantiers to Saint-Cyr-Grande-Ceinture (PK 5,100) | X | | | | | | | |
| 990 000 | from Saint-Cyr-Grande-Ceinture to Noisy-le-Roi (PK 10,060) | | X | | | | | | |
| 990 000 | from Noisy-le-Roi to Saint-Germain-en-Laye-Grande-Ceinture | X | | | | | | | |
| 990 000 | from Saint-Germain-en-Laye-Grande-Ceinture to Achères (bif. des Ambassadeurs) (PK 26,153) | | X | | | | | | |
| 990 000 | from Achères (bif. des Ambassadeurs) to Versailles-Chantiers | X | | | | | | | |
| 992 300 | Connection of Bas-Martineau | | X | | | | | | |

=== Corsica Lines ===
The three lines in Corsica are not part of the Réseau Ferré National. The two lines with passenger services still in operation are managed by Chemins de fer de la Corse, the infrastructure being the property of the Collectivité de Corse. Numbers for these lines were created in the RFN nomenclature for IT purposes, when they were operated by SNCF (from 1983 to 2012).

| N° | Railway Name | Status |
|---|---|---|
| 995 000 | Bastia to Ajaccio | Open to the public |
| 996 000 | Ponte-Leccia to Calvi | Open to the public |
| 997 000 | Casamozza to Porto-Vecchio | Decommissioned and filed |

== See also ==
=== Related articles ===
- List of railway lines in France
- fr:Lignes ferroviaires françaises désaffectées ou disparues
- fr:Numérotation des lignes de chemin de fer de la région Est
- Railway electrification in France
- Béziers to Neussargues Railway

=== External links ===
- SNCF Réseau website archive
- Access to the RFN on the Ministry's website archive
