= Raymond Thorold-Smith =

Australian WWII flying ace (1918–1943)

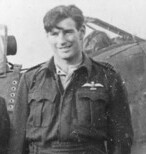
- Thorold-Smith, 1941
- Born: 30 June 1918; Manly, Sydney, Australia
- Died: 15 March 1943 (aged 24); Off Darwin Harbour, Darwin, Australia
- Military career
- Allegiance: Australia
- Branch: Royal Australian Air Force
- Service years: 1940–1943 (MIA)
- Rank: Squadron Leader
- Nickname: Throttle
- Commands: No. 452 Squadron
- Conflicts: Second World War; Circus offensive; Air raids on Australia
- Awards: Distinguished Flying Cross

Raymond Thorold-Smith, DFC (30 June 1918 – 15 March 1943) was an Australian flying ace who served in the Royal Australian Air Force (RAAF) during the Second World War. He was credited with having shot down at least six aircraft.

From Manly, Thorold-Smith was a university student at the time he joined the RAAF in 1940. Once his flight training was completed, he was sent to the United Kingdom. Posted to No. 452 Squadron in April 1941, he flew intensively on sorties to German-occupied France during the Circus offensive, during which he destroyed a number of German aircraft. By the end of the year, he had been promoted to flight lieutenant and was awarded the Distinguished Flying Cross. In March 1942, he was appointed commander of the squadron and later led it to back to Australia, where it formed part of No. 1 Fighter Wing at Darwin. In March 1943, he failed to return from a sortie to intercept Japanese bombers attacking Darwin and was presumed to have been killed.

== Early life ==
Raymond Thorold-Smith was born at Manly, in Sydney, Australia, on 30 June 1918, the son of Joseph Patrick and Beatrice Mary Thorold-Smith. He was schooled locally at Christian Brothers College, before going on to Waverley College in Sydney. For his tertiary education, he went to the University of Sydney, training in medicine. He was active in sports; being a proficient rugby union player, he represented the university in the sport and was also a New South Wales representative, playing one game against Queensland in 1938. He was a lifeguard, as a member of the Queenscliff Surf Life Saving Club.

== Second World War ==
In his fourth year of university studies at the time, Thorold-Smith joined the Royal Australian Air Force (RAAF) on 21 May 1940 as an aircraftman. He had originally joined the Australian Imperial Force but decided to transfer to the RAAF. Nicknamed 'Throttle', his initial training was at the RAAF station at Bradfield Park and then Narromine before he proceeded to Canada, for further training at Calgary. Having gained his wings, he was commissioned as a pilot officer in January 1941 and was sent to the United Kingdom to serve in the aerial campaign there.

Arriving in the United Kingdom in February, Thorold-Smith, after a period of time at an Operational Training Unit, was posted to the newly formed No. 452 Squadron on 21 April. Equipped with Supermarine Spitfire fighters and based at Kirton in Lindsey, his new unit was the first of the Australian Article XV squadrons to be formed in Fighter Command. Following a period of intensive training, it became operational on 22 May.

=== Circus offensive ===
From July, No. 452 Squadron participated in the Circus offensive. This was a co-operative effort with Bomber Command which involved the use of small groups of bombers to attack targets in occupied Europe with the intention of drawing the Luftwaffe into engagement with fighters that would escort the bombers. Alongside the New Zealand No. 485 Squadron and the British No. 602 Squadron, it was part of the Kenley Wing. On 9 August, Thorold-Smith, along with future flying ace Pilot Officer Keith Truscott, shared in the destruction of a Messerschmitt Bf 109 fighter, during a sortie escorting bombers attacking a power station at Béthune. However, the Australian military aviation historian Anthony Cooper notes that there is a possibility that this may have been an instance of a misidentified Spitfire. The sortie of 9 August was the first occasion on which Thorold-Smith flew as a section commander. On 27 August, while escorting Bristol Blenheim light bombers to Saint-Omer, Thorold-Smith destroyed a Bf 109 to the west of Gravelines, the confirmation of which being provided by Flight Lieutenant Paddy Finucane, one of the squadron's flight commanders. Continuing with the sortie, Thorold-Smith destroyed a second Bf 109 as he and Finucane flew west of Dunkirk.

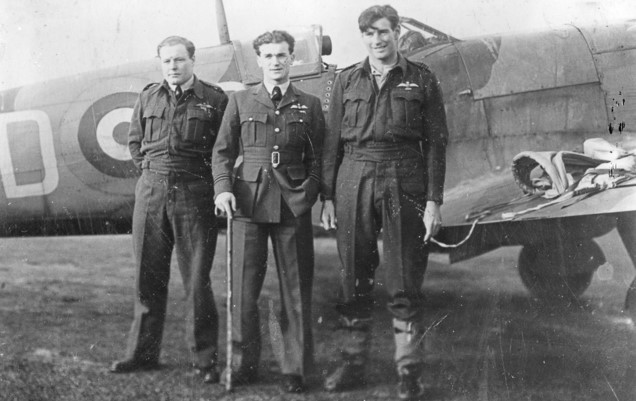
Keith Truscott, Brendan Finucane, and Thorold-Smith, 1941

On 18 September, No. 452 Squadron was one of several units escorting Blenheims on a mission to bomb a power station near Rouen. The Luftwaffe mounted a vigorous response, sending up a large number of fighters and in the ensuing and wide-ranging dogfight, Thorold-Smith shot down a Bf 109 over Rouen while his wingman was shot down and killed. Flying to the east of Hardelot on 13 October while acting as close escorts for some Blenheims targeting Arques, No. 452 Squadron was attacked by several Luftwaffe fighters. Out of seven German aircraft claimed to have been destroyed by pilots of the squadron, Thorold-Smith destroyed one Bf 109. He also damaged a second. On the return flight to England, he helped direct an Air Search Rescue vessel to the location of an Australian pilot who had baled out into the English Channel.

As a result of an injury to Finucane, arising from an accident while drinking to celebrate the squadron's success of 18 September, Thorold-Smith was promoted to flight lieutenant and given command of one of No. 452 Squadron's flights. On 6 November, several miles from Cap Gris-Nez, he shot down a Focke-Wulf Fw 190 fighter and a Bf 109. By this time offensive operations were becoming fewer in number due to poor weather. In recognition of his successes over the previous few months, in early December Thorold-Smith was awarded the Distinguished Flying Cross. The published citation read:

This officer has participated in 50 operational sorties since July, 1941. He has proved himself to be a first class fighter pilot and a most determined and capable flight leader. He has destroyed 5 enemy aircraft and shared in the destruction of another.

— London Gazette, No. 35364, 2 December 1941

For the early part of 1942, No. 452 Squadron's sorties were mainly in the form of intruder missions involving only a few aircraft at a time to the continent to seek out targets of opportunity; Thorold-Smith made one such sortie on 3 January, shooting up an alcohol distillery at Colleville. The squadron also engaged in fighter sweeps, intended to draw out the Luftwaffe. For the most part it saw little action until the end of February, when it commenced a brief period of intensive operations.

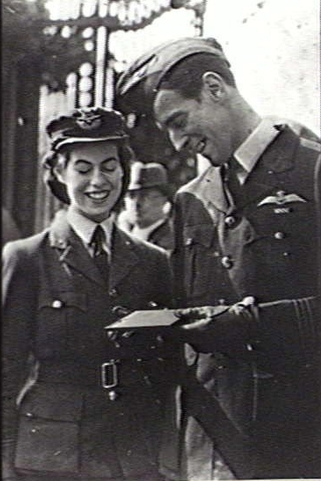
Thorold-Smith after being invested with his Distinguished Flying Cross, 1942

On 17 March 1942, No. 452 Squadron was withdrawn from operations for a rest, shifting to Andreas on the Isle of Man. At this time Thorold-Smith was promoted to squadron leader and appointed commander of the unit, succeeding Truscott, who had been leading the unit since late the previous year. The squadron was designated to return to Australia to join in the war effort there, following the entry of Japan into the Second World War. It duly departed for Australia from the United Kingdom on 21 June.

=== Service in Australia ===
No. 452 Squadron's Spitfires were requisitioned for service to the Middle East while the unit was in transit. It arrived in Australia in August and its personnel then had a period of leave. It was not until September that the squadron and its personnel reformed at Richmond. Even then its pilots had to use trainer aircraft until it began to receive Spitfires in November. After further training with its Spitfires, the squadron arrived in Darwin, in the Northern Territory, in January 1943. As part of No. 1 Fighter Wing, it was tasked with the defence of Darwin from Japanese air attacks, the city having been bombed several times in the preceding year. The squadron saw little action initially but on 3 March, Thorold-Smith led a section of Spitfires in an unsuccessful pursuit of Japanese Mitsubishi A6M Zero fighters that had strafed a nearby airfield.

Mid-morning on 15 March, radar detected incoming Japanese aircraft heading for Darwin and No. 1 Fighter Wing was scrambled. Thorold-Smith, along with four other pilots, had participated in night-time flying practice the previous evening and spent the night at Darwin. He was already in the air returning to the squadron's airfield when he and the other four pilots were diverted to join up with the wing. In the absence of its regular commander, Wing Commander Clive Caldwell, Thorold-Smith was to be wing leader, the first time he had flown in this capacity. The wing was unable to assemble in good time, so he led his section in an interception course with the bombers, ordering the remaining Spitfires to catch and intercept the formation as soon as they could. The Spitfires were lining up to engage the bombers when the escorting Zeroes, having a height advantage, attacked. Despite this, Thorold-Smith still sought out the bombers but was intercepted by several Zeroes and isolated from his wingmen. He never returned from the resulting engagement. A Spitfire believed to be his was seen going into the sea off Darwin Harbour but despite a search, no trace of him was found and he was subsequently reported as being missing in action. In 1986, the wreckage of his Spitfire was found at the bottom of Darwin Harbour.

Thorold-Smith, having no known grave, is commemorated on the Northern Territory Memorial to the Missing at the Adelaide River War Cemetery and on the Manly Cenotaph. At the time of his death, he was credited with having shot down seven German aircraft, one of which being shared with another pilot, and one damaged. A Spitfire flown by Thorold-Smith is presently on display at the Australian War Memorial in Canberra.
