= Bungey =

Bungey is a surname. Notable people with the surname include:

- Errol Bungey (born 1931), Australian bowls player
- Mel Bungey (born 1934), Australian politician
- Robert Bungey (1914–1943), Australian fighter pilot
