= Frederick Aikman =

Frederick Aikman may refer to:

- Frederick Robertson Aikman (1828–1888), Scottish recipient of the Victoria Cross
- Frederick Alan Aikman (1919–1991), Canadian World War II flying ace
