= Robert Bungey =

Australian flying ace (1914–1943)

Robert Wilton Bungey
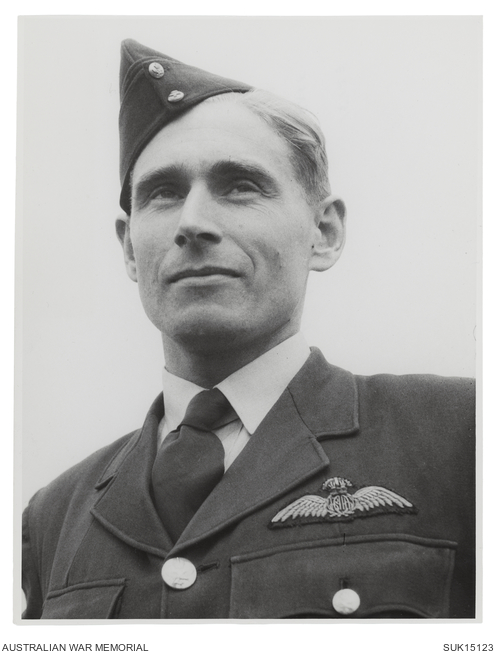
- Born: 4 October 1914; Fullarton, Adelaide, Australia
- Died: 10 June 1943 (aged 28); North Brighton, Adelaide, Australia
- Military career
- Allegiance: Australia
- Branch: Royal Australian Air Force; Royal Air Force
- Rank: Wing Commander
- Commands: No. 452 Squadron
- Conflicts: Second World War; Battle of France; Battle of Britain; Circus offensive
- Awards: Distinguished Flying Cross

Robert Wilton Bungey, DFC (4 October 1914 – 10 June 1943) was an Australian fighter pilot of the Royal Air Force (RAF) and later the Royal Australian Air Force (RAAF) during the Second World War. Officially, he was credited with five aerial victories and thus qualified as a flying ace but there is some uncertainty regarding this.

From Fullarton, in Adelaide, Bungey joined the RAAF in 1936 but after completing his flight training was discharged and accepted on a short service commission in the RAF. He was sent to the United Kingdom, where he was posted to No. 226 Squadron and flew Fairey Battles in the early stages of the Second World War. After the Battle of France, he transferred to Fighter Command and was posted to No. 145 Squadron. He flew in the later stages of the Battle of Britain.

Promoted to squadron leader in February 1941 he was given command of the Australian No. 452 Squadron, which he led for several months. Later in the war he commanded RAF stations before relinquishing his commission in January 1943 and transferred to the RAAF reserve. He returned to Australia later in the year. He was due to take command of a fighter wing in the far north of Australia but, distraught and depressed after the recent death of his wife, he shot himself and his son in Adelaide. The son survived and later wrote a biography of his father.

== Early life ==
Robert Wilton Bungey, the son of Ernest and Ada Blanche Bungey, was born on 14 October 1914 at Fullarton, a suburb of Adelaide, South Australia. He was educated at Glenelg Primary School before going to Adelaide High School. After completing his schooling, he found employment as a clerk in the insurance industry.

In July 1936, Bungey entered the Royal Australian Air Force (RAAF) and went to Point Cook for flight training as an air cadet. After 12 months, his course completed and he was discharged from the RAAF to take up a short service commission in the Royal Air Force (RAF). On 26 August 1937, he was commissioned as a pilot officer for a five-year period of service in the RAF. Bungey was posted to No. 226 Squadron, a unit of Bomber Command that operated the Fairey Battle light bomber from Harwell. In May 1939, he was promoted to flying officer.

== Second World War ==
Shortly after the outbreak of the Second World War, No. 226 Squadron was sent to France as part of the Advanced Air Striking Force (AASF). It was one of ten bomber squadrons of the AASF. The squadron made several attacks on the advancing German forces in the days following the commencement of the invasion of France and the Low Countries on 10 May 1940, including raids on the bridges across the Albert Canal. The bomber squadrons of the AASF suffered heavy casualties and the squadron was subsequently evacuated back to England in mid-June. Afterwards Bungey volunteered for a transfer to Fighter Command, which was short of pilots, and completed a conversion course on the Hawker Hurricane fighter.

In September, having been promoted to flight lieutenant, Bungey was posted to No. 145 Squadron. His new unit operated Hurricanes from Drem, where it was resting after being heavily involved in the Battle of Britain. It carried out patrols over the North Sea until returning south to the RAF station at Tangmere as part of No. 11 Group. The pace of operations had slowed by this time, but there was still the occasional engagement.

In one of these, on 7 November, Bungey was shot down. He baled out of his Hurricane, injuring his knee as he did so, and landed near the Isle of Wight. Returning to his squadron, Bungey shared in the destruction of a Junkers Ju 88 medium bomber on 9 November; the stricken aircraft was seen to crash near Villaroche. He was credited with a share in a destroyed Heinkel He 111 bomber on 11 December. Shortly afterwards, the squadron began to convert to the Supermarine Spitfire fighter.

No. 145 Squadron resumed offensive operations in early 1941 and at the start of February, Bungey was promoted to squadron leader. On 10 March he shot down a Ju 88 over the English Channel. The knee that he had injured the previous November continued to trouble him and he was taken off operations at the end of the month for medical treatment.

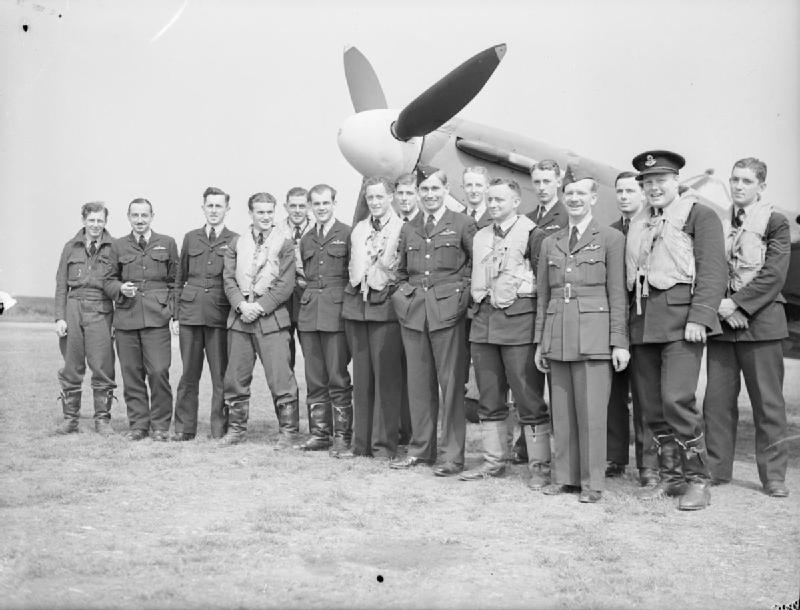
Pilots of No. 452 Squadron in front of a Supermarine Spitfire, June 1941. Bungey is in the centre, wearing a side cap.

=== Circus offensive ===
On 15 June, Bungey took command of No. 452 Squadron, the first of the Australian Article XV squadrons to be formed in Fighter Command. Until Bungey became its leader, the squadron was commanded by a British officer. At the time he joined the unit, it was engaged in convoy patrols, flying Spitfires from Kirton-in-Lindsey. He immediately stepped up the training intensity, focusing on air gunnery drills, formation flying practice and night landings. In July, the squadron began to be involved in Fighter Command's Circus offensive, its first operation being a sortie on 11 July.

Bungey would subsequently establish a reputation for his leadership and administration skills, reportedly often giving inexperienced pilots the opportunity for easy aerial victories rather than taking them himself. One of his junior pilots at the time, Keith Truscott, later reflected that Bungey "made the Australian Spitfire Squadron".

Under Bungey's leadership, No. 452 Squadron achieved a number of aerial victories, and in September was the most successful fighter squadron in Fighter Command. This prompted staff officers from No. 11 Group to investigate the claims made by the squadron's pilots. The most successful pilot, Flight Lieutenant Paddy Finucane, resented this although Bungey himself did not interfere. Nothing came of the investigation and Bungey was awarded the Distinguished Flying Cross (DFC). The citation, published in The London Gazette on 7 October, read:

This officer has been almost continually engaged on operations against the enemy since the war began. During operations in France he carried out many bombing and reconnaissance missions and later fought in the Battle of Britain. Since July, 1941, Squadron Leader Bungey has led the squadron, and occasionally the wing, on many operational sorties over Northern France. Brilliant successes have been achieved and, during August, the unit shot down twenty-four hostile aircraft. Throughout, this officer has displayed gallant and efficient leadership.

— London Gazette, No. 35297, 7 October 1941

To the surprise of his family and friends, in October, Bungey married Sybil Ellen Johnson, an English woman from Berkshire. The couple had been engaged for some time and it was not until after the wedding that the men under his command knew of it. The following year his wife travelled to Australia and gave birth to a son, Richard, in March 1942 in Adelaide.

On 4 November, No. 452 Squadron was flying as cover for spotter aircraft directing the firing of the Dover coastal artillery across the English Channel when they were attacked by a large group of Messerschmitt Bf 109 fighters. In the resulting dogfight, Bungey destroyed one of the Bf 109s. He destroyed another Bf 109 on 6 December. Offensive operations tailed off over the winter months, and relatively few missions were undertaken. Bungey's tenure as commander of No. 452 Squadron ended on 25 January 1942.

=== Later war service ===
Bungey was subsequently promoted to wing commander and posted to the RAF station at Shoreham as its commander; he later fulfilled a similar role at Hawkinge. In January 1943, he relinquished his commission and he was transferred to the reserve of the RAAF. He returned to Australia, reuniting with his wife Sybil and meeting his son Richard for the first time. He was scheduled to take up a posting as a commander of a fighter wing in the far north of Australia. Within a matter of weeks after his arrival, Sybil Bungey took ill and died in hospital on 27 May.

In the early afternoon of 10 June, distraught and depressed at the death of his wife, fearful that he would not survive his new posting as a wing commander, and concerned about his ability to care for his son, Bungey took Richard to North Brighton Beach. He shot his son in the head before turning his revolver to his own head and fatally shooting himself. The pair were discovered in the late afternoon; Richard Bungey, who was still alive, was taken to hospital.

Bungey was buried alongside his wife in the cemetery at St Jude's Church at Brighton on 12 June, in a well-attended ceremony. Five senior officers of the RAAF acted as pallbearers, along with Bungey's brother, who also served in the RAAF. Richard Bungey subsequently recovered sufficiently that he was discharged from hospital care in late July; the injuries he suffered involved nerve damage which meant that he would have a limp for the rest of his life.

== Legacy ==
At the time of his death, Bungey was officially credited with five aerial victories. Having included Bungey in their 1961 book listing all of the flying aces of the British and Commonwealth air forces of the Second World War, military aviation historians Christopher Shores and Clive Williams specifically excluded him from their 1994 update of their book. In doing so, they acknowledged including him in the original edition in error. Adam Cooper also notes that Bungey appears to have been a "conservative claimer" during his period as commander of No. 452 Squadron, not submitting a claim for his successes unless he was confident of the result. This was in contrast to some other pilots of the squadron.

Richard Bungey later wrote a biography of his father, which was published as Spitfire Leader. In August 2019 he advocated for a memorial plaque for Bungey in the city of Holdfast Bay, near Adelaide, and this was approved in January 2021. There were some reservations from city councillors, concerned at the perception of honouring Bungey given the circumstances of his death.

== See also ==
- List of World War II aces from Australia
