= St Paul's College, Manly =

Catholic boys school Sydney Australia since 1929

St Paul's Catholic College

Location
- Manly, Northern Beaches, Sydney, New South Wales; Australia; 33°48′21″S 151°17′33″E

Information
- Former name: Christian Brothers College, Manly
- Type: Independent secondary day school
- Motto: Latin: Prima Primum (First Things First)
- Religious affiliation: Catholicism
- Denomination: Congregation of Christian Brothers (1929–1982)
- Patron saint: Saint Paul
- Established: 29 January 1929; 97 years ago
- Founder: Terence Nereus Bourke, CFC
- Educational authority: New South Wales Department of Education
- Oversight: Diocese of Broken Bay
- Principal: Michael Reid
- Years offered: 7–12
- Gender: Boys
- Enrolment: 700
- Colours: Red and black
- Slogan: Turning Manly boys into manly men
- Website: www.stpaulsmanly.nsw.edu.au

St Paul's Catholic College (formerly named Christian Brothers College, Manly) is a diocesan Catholic secondary day school for boys, located in Manly, on the Northern Beaches of Sydney, New South Wales, Australia. The college was founded by the Congregation of Christian Brothers in 1929, and since 1982 has been conducted by lay staff appointed by the Diocese of Broken Bay.

As a regional secondary school, St Paul's provides for the boys of the Catholic parishes of Manly Freshwater (including Curl Curl, Fairlight, Freshwater, Manly), North Harbour (including Allambie, Balgowlah, Clontarf, Manly Vale, Seaforth), and Warringah (including Beacon Hill, Brookvale, Cromer, Dee Why, and Narraweena).

== Notable alumni ==
Media, entertainment, and the arts

- Joey Bizinger – YouTube personality and musician
- Ryan Kwanten – film and television actor
- Baz Luhrmann – film director, screenwriter, and producer
- Matt Nable – film and television actor, author, and former NRL player for Manly Warringah and South Sydney
- Paul Verhoeven – broadcaster, writer, blogger and comedian

Politics, public service, and the law

- Alex McTaggart – Northern Beaches Councillor, former mayor of Pittwater and Member of Parliament
- Raymond Thorold-Smith – Flying ace with the Royal Australian Air Force during the Second World War

Sport

- Phil Blake – rugby coach for Leicester Tigers, former rugby league player for Manly Warringah
- Adam Cuthbertson – rugby league player for Leeds, Manly Warringah, Cronulla, St George Illawarra, and Newcastle
- Oliver Davies – Australian cricketer
- Sam Hall – winter Olympian skier at Sochi 2014
- Nathan Hedge – professional surfer
- Adam Nable – former rugby league player for Manly Warringah, Wakefield Trinity, Balmain, Wests Tigers, North Queensland, and New York Knights
- Chris Nero – former rugby league player for St George Illawarra, Huddersfield, Salford City, and Bradford
- Shannon Nevin – former rugby league player for Manly Warringah, and founder of "Walk 'n' Talk" for suicide prevention
- Calem Nieuwenhof – soccer player for Western Sydney Wanderers
- Brad Parker – rugby league player for Manly Warringah Sea Eagles
- Chad Randall – former rugby league player for Manly Warringah, and former Super League player for London Broncos
- Aaron Trinder – rugby league player for Northern Devils, formerly Manly Warringah, North Sydney, and Halifax

== See also ==
- List of Catholic schools in New South Wales
- Catholic education in Australia
