= No. 452 Squadron RAAF =

Royal Australian Air Force squadron

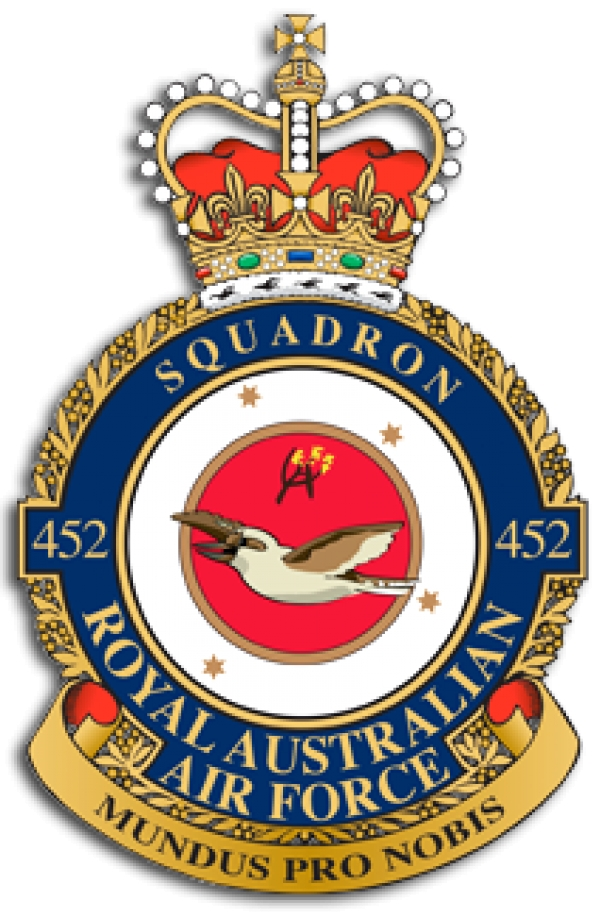
- No. Squadron Badge of No. 452 Squadron
- Active: 8 April 1941 – 17 November 1945; 16 February 2011–current
- Country: Australia
- Branch: Royal Australian Air Force
- Role: Fighter (1941–1945); Air traffic control (2011–current)
- Part of: No. 44 Wing
- Motto: Mundus Pro Nobis (Sweeping the world before us)
- Engagements: World War II
- Battle honours: Defence of Britain 1940–1945; English Channel and North Sea 1939–1945; Fortress Europe 1940–1944; Morotai; Borneo; Pacific 1941–1945; Darwin 1943–1944

Commanders
- Notable commanders: Keith "Bluey" Truscott; Lou Spence; Raymond Thorold-Smith
- Squadron codes: UD (Apr 1941 – Mar 1942); QY (Jan 1943 – Nov 1945)

Aircraft flown
- Fighter: Supermarine Spitfire

No. 452 Squadron is a Royal Australian Air Force (RAAF) air traffic control unit. It was established in 1941 as a fighter squadron, in accordance with Article XV of the Empire Air Training Scheme during World War II. The squadron flew Supermarine Spitfires for the entire war, initially over the United Kingdom and Nazi-occupied Europe. It was later based in Australia and the Netherlands East Indies, before being disbanded in 1945. It was re-raised in its current role in February 2011.

== History ==
=== Formation ===
No. 452 Squadron RAAF was formed at RAF Kirton-in-Lindsey on 8 April 1941 under Article XV of the Empire Air Training Scheme; it was the first Australian squadron formed in Britain during World War II. However, its ground crew were RAF personnel. Its first commander was also from the RAF, Squadron Leader Roy Dutton, a veteran of the Battle of Britain, as were the flight leaders: Flight Lieutenants Paddy Finucane, an Irish flying ace who had also flown in the Battle of Britain, and Graham Douglas. Although nominally an Australian unit while it was in Europe, No. 452 Squadron would also include British flying personnel, as well as pilots from British Commonwealth countries and other nationalities. A number of Polish pilots would fly with the squadron.

On 22 May, No. 452 Squadron became operational as a fighter unit, flying early model Supermarine Spitfires. The following month Squadron Leader Robert Bungey, an Australian in the RAF, took over from Dutton as commander. At the time he joined the unit, it was engaged in convoy patrols. Bungey increased the training intensity, focusing on air gunnery drills, formation flying practice and night landings. In July, the squadron was moved to the RAF station at Kenley, where it became part of No. 11 Group. Alongside the New Zealand No. 485 Squadron and the British No. 602 Squadron, it was part of the Kenley Wing.

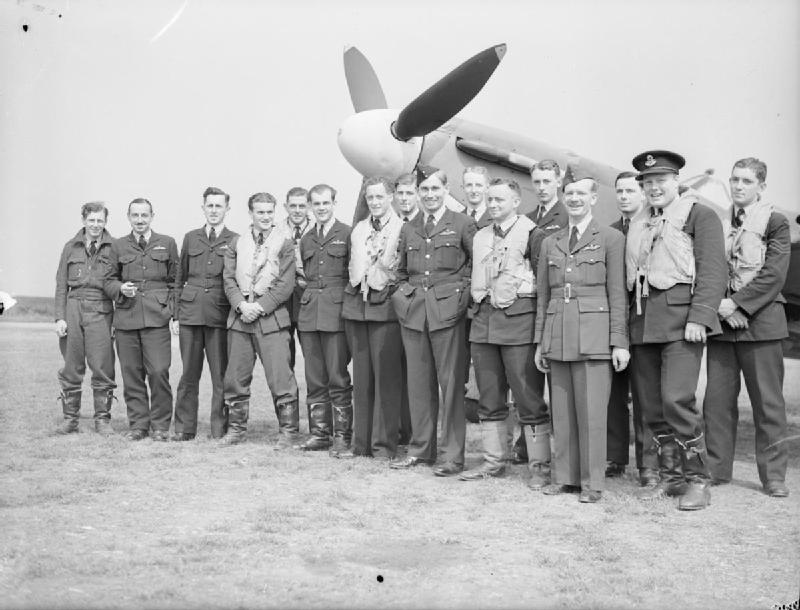
No. 452 Squadron pilots posing with a Spitfire at Kirton-in-Lindsey

=== Circus offensive ===
The squadron rapidly developed a formidable reputation in operations against German forces; in one month it was credited with shooting down 22 German Bf 109 fighters. However, there were some scepticism regarding its claims and staff officers from No. 11 Group investigated their veracity, to the chagrin of Paddy Finucane, one of the most successful pilots of the squadron. Nothing came of this although concerns remained, particularly among the pilots of the other squadrons of the Kenley Wing who, despite often being in the vicinity of the engagements during which the Australians made claims, saw few Luftwaffe fighters.

No. 452 Squadron was involved in many different kinds of operation, including offensive patrols, convoy escort and bomber escort missions over Europe. One of the most unusual occurred on 19 August 1941, when the Kenley Wing—among others—had to escort a formation that included a Blenheim bomber that—with the co-operation of the Germans—dropped an artificial leg by parachute, for British ace Douglas Bader, who was a prisoner of war. The bombers then flew on to bomb the Gosnay power plant. In the dogfighting that took place during the operation, No. 452 Squadron was heavily engaged, shooting down one aircraft and scoring "probable" victories over two others; several of its aircraft were damaged.

Another notable operation was the attack on the German warships Scharnhorst, Prinz Eugen and Gneisenau, which were attempting the Channel Dash from Brest harbour on 11 February 1942, damaging one of the escorting destroyers. One of the squadron's best known pilots during this time was Keith "Bluey" Truscott, who was credited with 16 aerial victories from April 1941 to March 1942 and was awarded the Distinguished Flying Cross (DFC) while serving with No. 452 Squadron in Britain.

The squadron moved to RAF Redhill in October 1941, remaining there until March 1942, when No. 452 Squadron replaced its sister, No. 457 Squadron, at RAF Andreas, Isle of Man, where it remained until it withdrew from operations in Britain in June to return to Australia. Its final aerial victory came that month and the squadron's final tally in Europe was 70 enemy aircraft shot down and 17 damaged, for the loss of 22 pilots killed. It sailed for home on 21 June, arriving in Melbourne on 13 August and re-assembled at RAAF Station Richmond, New South Wales on 6 September. The squadron began refresher training at Richmond, using a varied collection of aircraft because its Spitfires had been commandeered in transit by the Royal Air Force in the Middle East.

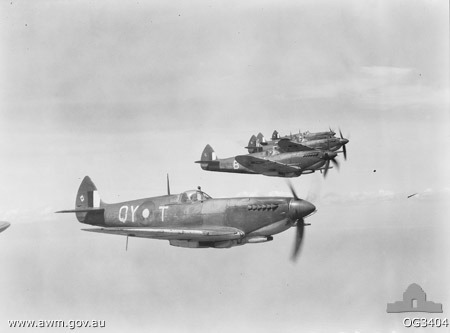
No. 452 Squadron Spitfire aircraft near Morotai in late 1944

=== Service in Southwest Pacific ===
No. 452 Squadron became operational again on 17 January 1943, having received Spitfire MK Vc aircraft in October the previous year. Based at Batchelor Airfield in the Northern Territory it became part of No. 1 Wing RAAF, which defended Darwin from Japanese air raids. The squadron was relocated to Strauss Airfield on 1 February and apart a brief period between 9 and 27 March 1943 when it was deployed to RAAF Station Pearce to reinforce the air defences of Perth, it remained at Strauss, protecting Darwin, until 30 June 1944. The previous April, the squadron had received more advanced Mark VIII Spitfire. In May, it had become part of No. 80 Wing RAAF. Throughout this period, the squadron was involved in significant actions during which it shot down several Japanese aircraft; its first big battle took place in early March.

On 1 July 1944 the squadron relocated again, this time to Sattler Airfield in the Northern Territory. Responsibility for defending Darwin had been handed over to two Royal Air Force squadrons; No. 452 Squadron was reassigned to ground-attack missions. The squadron began attacking targets in the Dutch East Indies and on 11 December 1944 it was sent to Morotai, where it was assigned to the 1st Tactical Air Force, to support the Australian operations in Kalimantan, flying mainly ground attack missions and anti-shipping strikes. The ground staff were sent to Juwata airfield on Tarakan in May 1945 but operations had to wait until the landing field was ready. The squadron undertook missions against Kelabaken and Simalumong on 2 July; further attacks occurred on Tawoa on 10 July. A detachment moved to Balikpapan on 15 July and began operations to support Australian troops there. The detachment remained until the end of the war, flying its last sortie on 10 August 1945; its final aerial victory of the war came on 24 July when a Japanese bomber was shot down in a night raid over Balikpapan.

Operations continued after the war, albeit limited to defensive duties only. In October the aircraft of 452 Squadron were returned to Australia and the unit disbanded at Tarakan on 17 November 1945. Australian casualties during the war amounted to 49 killed.

=== Reformation ===
No. 452 Squadron was re-raised as an air traffic control unit on 16 February 2011. It forms part of No. 44 Wing at RAAF Base Darwin. It maintains subordinate flights at the "northern" RAAF bases, RAAF Base Darwin, RAAF Base Tindal, RAAF Base Amberley, RAAF Base Townsville and the Oakey Army Aviation Centre. These flights provide the air traffic control service for these bases.

== Aircraft operated ==
No. 452 Squadron operated the following aircraft:

| From | To | Aircraft | Version |
|---|---|---|---|
| April 1941 | May 1941 | Supermarine Spitfire | Mk.I |
| May 1941 | August 1941 | Supermarine Spitfire | Mk.IIa |
| August 1941 | October 1943 | Supermarine Spitfire | Mk.Vb |
| October 1943 | April 1944 | Supermarine Spitfire | Mk. Vc |
| April 1944 | November 1945 | Supermarine Spitfire | Mk.VIII |

== Squadron bases ==
No. 452 Squadron operated from the following bases and airfields:

| From | To | Base | Remark |
|---|---|---|---|
| 8 April 1941 | 21 July 1941 | RAF Kirton-in-Lindsey, Lincolnshire | |
| 21 July 1941 | 21 October 1941 | RAF Kenley, Surrey | |
| 21 October 1941 | 14 January 1942 | RAF Redhill, Surrey | |
| 14 January 1942 | 23 March 1942 | RAF Kenley | |
| 23 March 1942 | 21 June 1942 | RAF Andreas, Isle of Man | Ground echelon at RAF Atcham, Shropshire |
| 21 June 1942 | 13 August 1942 | en route to Australia | |
| 6 September 1942 | 17 January 1943 | RAAF Richmond, New South Wales | RAAF Station Mascot |
| 17 January 1943 | 1 February 1943 | Batchelor Airfield, Northern Territory | |
| 1 February 1943 | 9 March 1943 | Strauss Airfield, Northern Territory | Dets. at Wyndham, Western Australia and Milingimbi Island, Northern Territory |
| 9 March 1943 | 27 March 1943 | RAAF Station Pearce, Western Australia | Guildford Airfield |
| 27 March 1943 | 30 June 1944 | Strauss Airfield, Northern Territory | |
| 1 July 1944 | 11 December 1944 | Sattler Airfield, Northern Territory | |
| 11 December 1944 | 29 June 1945 | Morotai, Dutch East Indies | |
| 29 June 1945 | 17 November 1945 | Juwata Airfield, Tarakan | Det. at Balikpapan Airfield, Kalimantan |
| 16 February 2011 | Current | RAAF Base Darwin, Northern Territory | Subordinate detachments at RAAF Base Tindal, RAAF Base Townsville, RAAF Base Amberley and Oakey Army Aviation Centre |

== Commanding officers ==
No. 452 Squadron was commanded by the following officers:

| From | Name |
|---|---|
| 13 April 1941 | Squadron Leader Roy Dutton (RAF), DFC & Bar |
| 15 June 1941 | Squadron Leader Robert Wilton Bungey (RAF), DFC |
| 25 January 1942 | Squadron Leader Keith "Bluey" Truscott, DFC & Bar |
| 18 March 1942 | Squadron Leader Ray Edward Thorold-Smith, DFC |
| 30 March 1943 | Squadron Leader Ronald Sommerville MacDonald |
| 3 February 1944 | Squadron Leader Louis Thomas Spence, DFC |
| 4 June 1945 | Squadron Leader Kevin Milne Barclay |

== See also ==
- RAAF units under RAF operational control
