= Roy Dutton =

Royal Air Force officer and decorated flying ace (1917 – 1988)

Roy Gilbert Dutton
- Born: 2 March 1917; Hatton, British Ceylon
- Died: 14 September 1988 (aged 71)
- Military career
- Allegiance: United Kingdom
- Branch: Royal Air Force
- Service years: 1936–1970
- Rank: Air Commodore
- Commands: RAF Waterbeach; No. 525 Squadron RAF (1945–1946); No. 512 Squadron RAF (1945); No. 19 Squadron RAF (1941); No. 452 Squadron RAAF (1941)
- Conflicts: Second World War: Battle of France; Battle of Britain; Circus offensive; Rhine Crossing
- Awards: Commander of the Order of the British Empire; Distinguished Service Order; Distinguished Flying Cross & Bar; Mentioned in Despatches

Roy Gilbert Dutton, CBE, DSO, DFC & Bar (2 March 1917 – 14 September 1988) was a British flying ace who served with the Royal Air Force (RAF) during the Second World War. He was credited with having shot down at least nineteen aircraft.

Born in British Ceylon, Dutton was a member of the Royal Air Force Volunteer Reserve when he was called up for service in the RAF on the outbreak of the Second World War. Once his flight training was completed, he joined No. 111 Squadron. Flying the Hawker Hurricane fighter, he made his first claim for an aerial victory in January 1940. He was posted to No. 145 Squadron in May 1940, and with this unit claimed several aerial victories during the Battle of France and the following Battle of Britain. His successes saw him awarded the Distinguished Flying Cross and bar. In 1941, he oversaw the formation of No. 452 Squadron and then briefly commanded No. 19 Squadron.

His later war service was spent commanding ferry flights and transport squadrons. As commander of No. 512 Squadron, he was awarded the Distinguished Service Order for his conduct during the Rhine Crossing of March 1945. He remained in the RAF in the postwar period, and went on to serve in a number of staff roles and as a defence attaché at the United Kingdom's embassy in Moscow. He retired from the RAF in 1970 and in civilian life worked for the RAF Benevolent Fund. He died in 1988, aged 71.

== Early life ==
Roy Gilbert Dutton was born on 2 March 1917 in Hatton, British Ceylon, but received his education in England. He later worked in the insurance industry as a clerk. He learnt to fly at Hanworth Flying Club and in June 1936, he joined the Royal Air Force (RAF) on a short service commission and commenced the first phase of flight training. On completion of his course, Dutton was commissioned into the RAF on 24 August as a probationary acting pilot officer. Further flight training at No. 8 Flying Training School at Montrose followed and in April 1937 he was posted to No. 111 Squadron.

Dutton's new unit was stationed at Northolt and equipped with the Gloster Gauntlet biplane aircraft but soon was to be the first RAF squadron to receive the Hawker Hurricane fighter. Two months after his arrival at the squadron, Dutton's commission was confirmed and he was regraded to pilot officer. On 29 January 1939, he was promoted to flying officer.

== Second World War ==
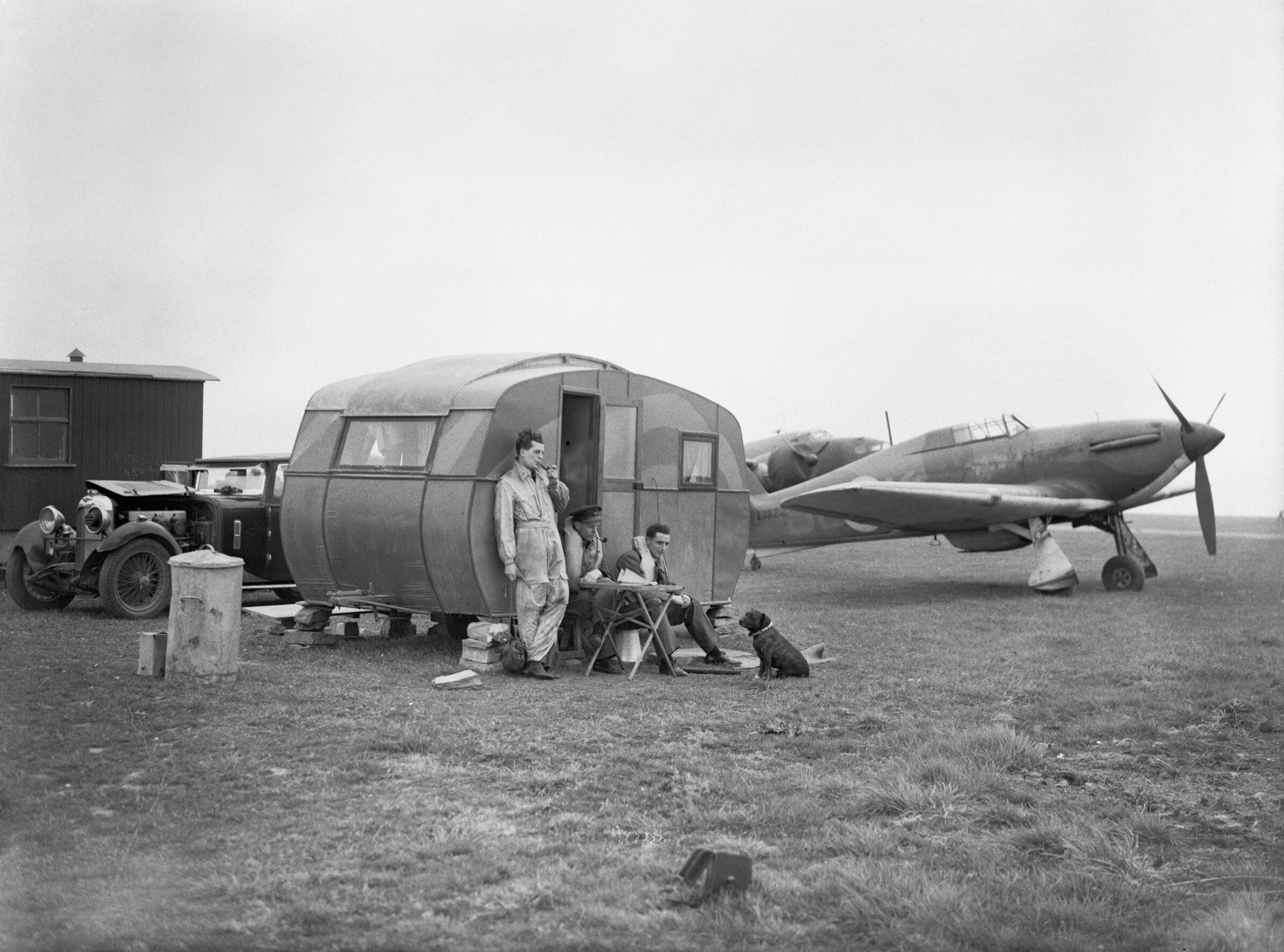
Pilots of No. 111 Squadron at Wick, early 1940

Shortly after the outbreak of the Second World War, No. 111 Squadron moved north, initially to Acklington and then to Drem in Scotland, from where it patrolled along the coastline. On 13 January Dutton shared in the destruction of a Heinkel He 111 medium bomber near Farne Island; it had already been damaged in an earlier action with No. 602 Squadron. In February the squadron relocated to Wick, where it provided the Royal Navy base at Scapa Flow with aerial cover. It was occasionally scrambled to counter Luftwaffe bomber attacks. Two months later Dutton was posted to No. 145 Squadron as a flight commander, assuming the rank of acting flight lieutenant. The squadron was based at Croydon from where it operated Hurricanes.

=== Battle of France ===
In mid-May, following the invasion of France, No. 145 Squadron began ferrying Hurricanes there as reinforcements for the RAF fighter squadrons there. It occasionally engaged Luftwaffe aircraft while operating in France. On 18 May Dutton destroyed one He 111 and shared in the destruction of a second He 111 while on patrol over Belgium. The following day he shot down an additional He 111 while flying west of Arras. On 22 May he destroyed one Junkers Ju 87 dive bomber and damaged two others near Saint-Omer. By the end of the month, No. 145 Squadron was based back in England, at Tangmere and flying patrols to Dunkirk to help protect the British troops being evacuated from the beaches there as part of Operation Dynamo. At this time Dutton was awarded the Distinguished Flying Cross (DFC) in recognition of his exploits in France. The citation, published in the London Gazette, read:

In May, 1940, whilst leading a section of a squadron on patrol over Brussels. Flt. Lt. Dutton attacked and shot down two Heinkel 111 aircraft. The next day, when leading a section of a squadron, seven Messerschmitt fighters were sighted escorting from fifty to seventy enemy bombers. The leader of the formation attacked the bombers, and Flt. Lt. Dutton, realising the danger to the formation, ordered two aircraft of his own section also to attack the bombers whilst he climbed and engaged the Messerschmitts until the attack on the bombers was completed. He then dived away, and flying west sighted and shot down a Heinkel 111 with his remaining ammunition. Flt. Lt. Dutton has displayed initiative, gallantry and a complete disregard for his own safety.

— London Gazette, No. 34860, 28 May 1940

Dutton shot down a Messerschmitt Bf 109 fighter to the north of Dunkirk on 31 May, and shared in the destruction of a second Bf 109. The next day he destroyed a Messerschmitt Bf 110 heavy fighter, also in the vicinity of Dunkirk, as well shooting down two Bf 109s.

=== Battle of Britain ===
Being based at Tangmere throughout June and July, No. 145 Squadron became heavily engaged in the developing Battle of Britain. On 1 July, 45 miles (72 km) south of Beachy Head, Dutton shared in the destruction of a Dornier Do 17 medium bomber. A week later he and another pilot were credited with the shooting down of a Do 17 to the south of The Needles. Dutton destroyed a He 111 on 11 July, while flying some 15 miles (24 km) to the south west of Selsey Bill. He damaged two Ju 88s over the English Channel on 17 July and two days later shared in the shooting down of a He 111 to the south of Brighton. At the start of August he damaged a Ju 88 near Beachy Head and then, on 8 August, destroyed three Ju 87s in an area extending between 8 miles (13 km) to 15 miles (24 km) south of St Catherine's Point. He also damaged a Bf 109 in the same vicinity. On 11 August he was involved in an engagement with Bf 110s to the south of Swanage, damaging two of them and probably destroying two others. The next day he shot down a Ju 88 about 6 miles (9.7 km) from Selsey.

Shortly afterwards, No. 145 Squadron was sent north to Drem, in Scotland, for a period of rest. On 20 August, Dutton was awarded a Bar to his DFC. The citation for the Bar read,

This officer has led patrols with conspicuous success and has personally destroyed at least twelve enemy aircraft. He has displayed splendid qualities of leadership and courage, with a complete disregard for his own safety.

— London Gazette, No. 34927, 20 August 1940

In late August Dutton went on sick leave for several months. In the interim, No. 145 Squadron returned to Tangmere although by this time the pace of operations over southeast England was much reduced. Dutton, whose substantive rank had been made up to flight lieutenant in September, returned to the squadron in December although was still not fit to return to operational flying.

=== Squadron command ===
In April 1941, Dutton was promoted to acting squadron leader and appointed commander of the new No. 452 Squadron. A fighter squadron equipped with Supermarine Spitfire fighters and stationed at Kirton-in-Lindsey, its flying personnel were Australian, aside from Dutton and his two flight commanders. Command of the squadron was relinquished to Squadron Leader Robert Bungey, an Australian, in mid-June. Dutton then went No. 19 Squadron as its commander on 15 June. This was another Spitfire squadron, based at West Malling, and was engaged in the RAF's Circus offensive. In a sortie to France on 23 June, Dutton damaged a Bf 109 near Hardelot. The following month he was posted away to serve as a staff officer at the Air Ministry.

=== Later war service ===
In March 1942, Dutton went to No. 54 Operational Training Unit at Church Fenton for a conversion course to the Bristol Beaufighter heavy fighter. On 17 April he was posted to No. 141 Squadron, where he served as a flight commander. The squadron operated Beaufighter night-fighters from Acklington but despite flying many sorties, Dutton never achieved a successful interception. Towards the end of the year, Dutton was posted to an aircraft delivery unit based at Croydon, where he served until May 1943, when he proceeded to the RAF Headquarters in the Middle East. After four months service there, he was appointed commander of a ferry flight based at Habbaniya in Iraq. Promoted to substantive squadron leader at the end of the year, he went to No. 249 Wing as its Senior Air Staff Officer in April 1944. Two months later, in the King's Birthday Honors, he was mentioned in despatches.

In July 1944, Dutton was promoted to wing commander (temporary). He was repatriated to the United Kingdom in December, where he took up a posting with Transport Command as a staff officer at the headquarters of No. 46 Group. In January 1945, he became commander of No. 512 Squadron, which was equipped with the Douglas DC-3 transport aircraft and based at Broadwell. In March, he was the leading pilot of the 400-aircraft glider train transporting one of the airborne divisions involved in the Rhine Crossing. Despite heavy anti-aircraft fire, he ensured that his glider was only let go from his tow rope when he was confident that it could reached its designated landing zone. As a result of his conduct in this operation, he was awarded the Distinguished Service Order. The citation, published in June, read,

This officer was detailed to lead the glider train comprising well over 400 tug and glider combinations which conveyed members of the airborne division concerned to a point between Weser and Emmerich in March, 1945. Keenly aware of the responsibility entrusted to him, Wing Commander Dutton led this great force with skill and good judgment to the battle area. First to reach the zone, his tug glider combination was subjected to heavy fire but Wing Commander Dutton flew straight and steady to the landing zone several miles behind the enemy's lines. Only when sure that the glider could reach the objective would, he give the order to release. This officer displayed skill, courage and devotion to duty of the highest order.

— London Gazette, No. 37115, 8 June 1945

== Postwar career ==
Following the end of the Second World War, Dutton opted to remain in the RAF and was granted a permanent commission as a squadron leader. At the time he was leading No. 525 Squadron, another unit of Transport Command, and remained in this role until March 1946. Much of the remainder of his postwar career was spent in staff appointments. He relinquished the acting rank of wing commander on 1 November 1947. He was promoted to substantive wing commander on 1 July 1950 and to group captain on 1 July 1957. By this time he was commander of the RAF station at Waterbeach, in Cambridgeshire.

In the 1966 Queen's Birthday Honours, Dutton was appointed a Commander of the Order of the British Empire (CBE). He was appointed Aide-de-Camp to Queen Elizabeth II on 16 February 1965, and relinquished the appointment on 3 December 1970. During this period, he was serving at Bomber Command as a staff officer, before going on to an appointment as the defence attaché at the United Kingdom's embassy in Moscow. Dutton retired from the RAF on 3 December 1970 in the rank of air commodore.

== Later life ==
Dutton maintained a connection to the RAF in his civilian life; he worked as an administrator of the Welfare Branch of the RAF Benevolent Fund. Retiring in 1982, he died on 14 September 1988 and was subsequently interred at the cemetery at St. Luke's at Whyteleafe, in Surrey. Dutton is credited with the destruction of nineteen aircraft, six of which were shared with other pilots. He damaged nine aircraft and probably destroyed two more.
