= Frederick Alan Aikman =

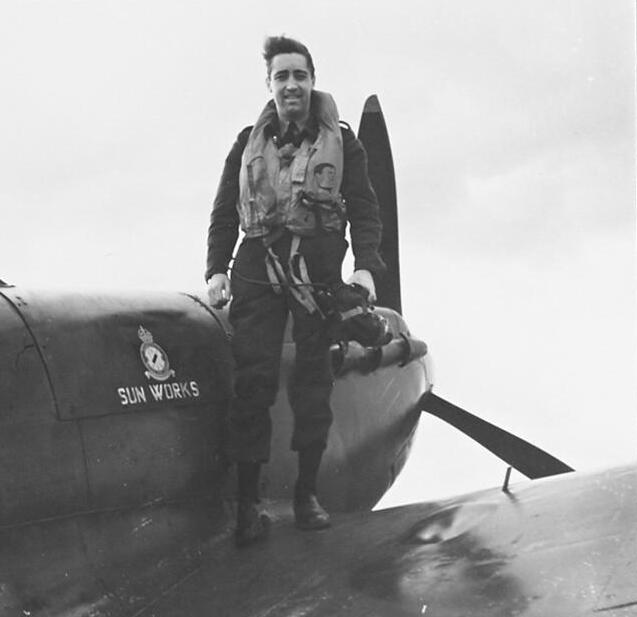
- Aikman, 1943
- Born: 5 March 1919; Toronto, Ontario, Canada
- Died: 21 March 1991 (aged 72); St. Catharines, Ontario, Canada
- Military career
- Allegiance: British Empire
- Branch: Royal Canadian Air Force
- Service years: 1940–1945
- Nickname: Butch
- Units: No. 134 Squadron; No. 154 Squadron
- Conflicts: Second World War: Circus offensive
- Awards: Distinguished Flying Cross & Bar

Frederick Alan "Butch" Aikman DFC and Bar (5 March 1919 – 21 March 1991) was a Canadian fighter pilot and flying ace with the Royal Air Force during the Second World War. He was credited with the destruction of at least nine aircraft.

== Biography ==
Born on 5 March 1919 in Toronto, Canada, Aikman was a clerk and ledger keeper and served as a sergeant in The Queen's Own Rifles of Canada before enlisting in the Royal Canadian Air Force on 6 November 1940. After graduation from flight training school on 13 September 1941, Aikman was posted overseas to serve with the Royal Air Force.

After a brief period of service with No. 134 Squadron, Aikman joined No. 154 Squadron in early 1942. On 15 July, Aikman was flying as wing man to Wing Commander Paddy Finucane on a sortie to German-occupied France, when the latter was killed as a result of ditching in the English Channel.

No. 154 Squadron moved to North Africa in January 1943, where Aikman achieved the majority of his victories. In February he was awarded the Distinguished Flying Cross (DFC). He was hospitalized for malaria on 27 July and repatriated to Canada. He was subsequently awarded a Bar to his DFC, for which the published citation read:

Flight Lieutenant Aikman is a keen and tenacious fighter. He has destroyed at least 8 enemy aircraft. He has shown a rare zest for battle

— London Gazette, No. 36215, 19 October 1943

After recuperation in Canada, Aikman was retrained to fly Dakotas and reposted overseas on 27 September 1944. Flying with No. 436 Squadron RCAF from 14 November 1944 to 23 September 1945, Aikman was returned to Canada on 23 November 1945, and released from service the following month.

Aikman died in St. Catharines, Ontario, on 21 March 1991 at the age of 72.

== Victories ==
Date	#	Type	Location	Aircraft flown	Unit assigned	Notes
12 November 1942	one	Ju.88				destroyed
13 November 1942	one	Ju.88				destroyed
16 November 1942	two	Savoia				half-share in each
22 November 1942	one	Ju.88				probably destroyed
28 November 1942	two	Do.217				1 destroyed 1 damaged
13 January 1943	one	FW.190				destroyed
5 April 1943	one	Ju.87				destroyed
5 April 1943	one	Bf.109G				damaged
10 April 1943	one	Bf.109G				destroyed
13 April 1943	one	Bf.109G				damaged
25 April 1943	one	Bf.109G				destroyed
17 July 1943	one	Macchi				destroyed (fighter)
