= Paddy Finucane =

Irish RAF officer killed in action

Brendan "Paddy" Finucane
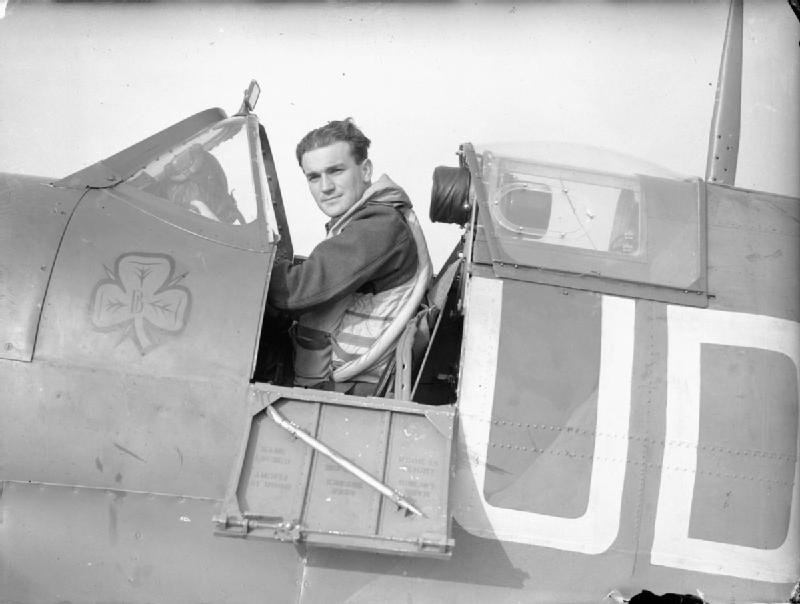
- Finucane in his Spitfire with the shamrock motif on the fuselage.
- Born: 16 October 1920; Rathmines, County Dublin, Ireland
- Died: 15 July 1942 (aged 21); English Channel, off Le Touquet, German-occupied France
- Military career
- Allegiance: United Kingdom
- Branch: Royal Air Force
- Service years: 1938–42
- Rank: Wing commander
- Nickname: Paddy
- Service number: 41276
- Units: No. 65 Squadron RAF; No. 452 Squadron RAAF
- Commands: Hornchurch Wing; No. 602 Squadron RAF
- Conflicts: Second World War: European air campaign; Battle of Britain; The Hardest Day; Channel Front †
- Awards: Distinguished Service Order; Distinguished Flying Cross & Two Bars

Wing Commander Brendan Eamonn Fergus Finucane, DSO, DFC & Two Bars (/fɪˈnuːkən/ fin-OO-kən; 16 October 1920 – 15 July 1942), known as Paddy Finucane among his colleagues, was an Irish Second World War Royal Air Force (RAF) fighter pilot and flying ace—defined as an aviator credited with five or more enemy aircraft destroyed in aerial combat.

Born into a Catholic family, Finucane grew up during the period also known as the "early troubles" (Note: The phrase was and is used by academics to describe the conflicts in the 1920s but, more recently, the violence dating from the 1960s to the late 1990s.) and the Irish Civil War. In 1936, the family moved to the United Kingdom, where he developed an interest in aviation. Finucane was keen to fly, applied to join the RAF and was accepted for training as a pilot in August 1938. After a shaky training career, in which he crash-landed on one occasion, he received news that he had completed flight training. In June–July 1940, he began conversion training on the Supermarine Spitfire. On 13 July, Finucane was posted to No. 65 Squadron at RAF Hornchurch.

Finucane's first victory was scored on 12 August 1940 during the Battle of Britain. During the campaign, he was credited with two enemies destroyed, two probably destroyed and one damaged. Promoted to acting flight lieutenant in April 1941, he joined No. 452 Squadron flying offensive patrols over France—known as the Circus offensive. During this period, Finucane had his most successful period of operations, destroying 20 German aircraft, sharing in the destruction of three, with two damaged and another two probably destroyed from 4 January to 13 October 1941.

In January 1942, Finucane was promoted to the rank of squadron leader in No. 602 Squadron. Within six months, he was credited a further six individual victories, bringing his tally to 28. Four more were damaged, four were shared destroyed and two credited as individual probable victories and one shared probable. In June 1942, he became the RAF's youngest wing commander in its history. Finucane was appointed to lead the Hornchurch Wing.

On 15 July 1942, Finucane took off with his flight for a mission over France. His Spitfire was damaged by ground-fire, and while attempting to fly back to the United Kingdom across the English Channel, he was forced to ditch into the sea and perished. After his death, Finucane's brother Raymond served in No. 101 Squadron RAF and survived the war.

Finucane was credited with 28 aerial victories, five probably destroyed, six shared destroyed, one shared probable victory and eight damaged. Included in his total were 23 Messerschmitt Bf 109s, four Focke-Wulf Fw 190s and one Messerschmitt Bf 110. Official records differ over the exact total. After the war it was confirmed that two of Finucane's "probable" victories had, in fact, been destroyed but were not officially included. His total victory count could be as high as 32.

== Early life ==
Brendan Finucane was born on 16 October 1920, the first child of Thomas Andrew and Florence Louise Finucane of 13 Rathmines Road, Rathmines, Dublin, Ireland. His mother was English, originally from Leicester. Her mother had travelled across Canada at a young age, and Florence moved to Dublin to seek her own adventure. She accepted the risks associated with living in the city. In 1919, she met Thomas Finucane, who had been involved in the Irish Rebellion. Thomas Finucane had been taught mathematics at college by Éamon de Valera, leader of the Irish opposition. As a member of the Irish Volunteers, he served under de Valera's command in the 1916 Easter Rising in Dublin. Thomas' father, Brendan Finucane's grandfather, was an Irishman who had served in the King's Own Scottish Borderers on the North-West Frontier Province. Thomas Finucane had ceased his political activism shortly before the couple married in October 1919, and after Florence had converted to Catholicism.

The couple moved to Drumcondra in October 1919, where Thomas found a job as a bank cashier. The job did not pay well, but the two managed on his meagre wages. In early 1920, they moved to Grove Road in the Rathmines district, and Brendan was born in October. Soon afterwards, Brendan and his mother were nearly killed, when caught in cross-fire between the temporary constables employed by the Royal Irish Constabulary (RIC), known as the "Black and Tans", and the Irish Republican Army (IRA). In 1921, Brendan's brother Raymond was born, followed by sisters Clare and Monica, and another brother, Kevin. The household was somewhat split over religious and political issues. Their father was a teetotaller and a strict Catholic. Their mother, however, encouraged the elder brothers to adopt a more liberal leaning in life. Brendan was educated at Synge Street and Marlborough Street. At 10, Brendan showed a keen interest in sport, particularly rugby.

In summer 1932, the Finucane brothers were taken to an air show at Baldonnel and had a 10-minute flight. Brendan expressed his desire to become a pilot, an ambition which strengthened during holiday visits to air shows at Swaythling and Eastleigh airfields in Hampshire, England. In August 1933, the family moved to New Grange Road, Cabra. Brendan started school at the Christian Brothers O'Connell School, a distinguished Roman Catholic school in North Richmond Street. There he became a successful rugby player, rower and a champion boxer. Among his classmates were future radio and TV sports commentators Michael O'Hehir and Philip Greene.

After a visit to the United Kingdom in July 1936 Thomas Finucane, now a company director, decided to establish an office in the West End of London. In November 1936, the family moved to Britain permanently and bought a house at 26 Castlegate, Richmond, which was then in Surrey and is now in the London Borough of Richmond upon Thames. Brendan was sent to Cardinal Vaughan Memorial School. Brendan completed his schooling with good qualifications. He started in an office job as an accountant, which he loathed. In 1937, the RAF began offering short-service commissions (SSC) to lower-class persons who met the academic standard. It offered a four-year term as a junior rank, on squadron service with flying lessons. A further six years would be spent on the reserve list. In November 1937, Brendan approached his father about joining the British Armed Forces. Despite his Republican past, the senior Finucane agreed, believing a military career would provide a sense of direction lacking in his own youth. His parents cashed in their insurance policies, even though they needed the money and Thomas Andrew Finucane had been made unemployed.

== Royal Air Force ==
In April 1938, aged 17 and a half (the minimum application age), Finucane handed in his application to the Air Ministry at Kingsway, London, on his way to work. Eight weeks later, in June 1938, he was invited for an interview. He showed a keenness to fly, sound school leaving certificate qualifications and a good sporting record. After waiting two months, in August 1938 Brendan Finucane was ordered to report to the 6 Elementary and Reserve Flying Training School at Sywell in Northamptonshire. He arrived on 28 August.

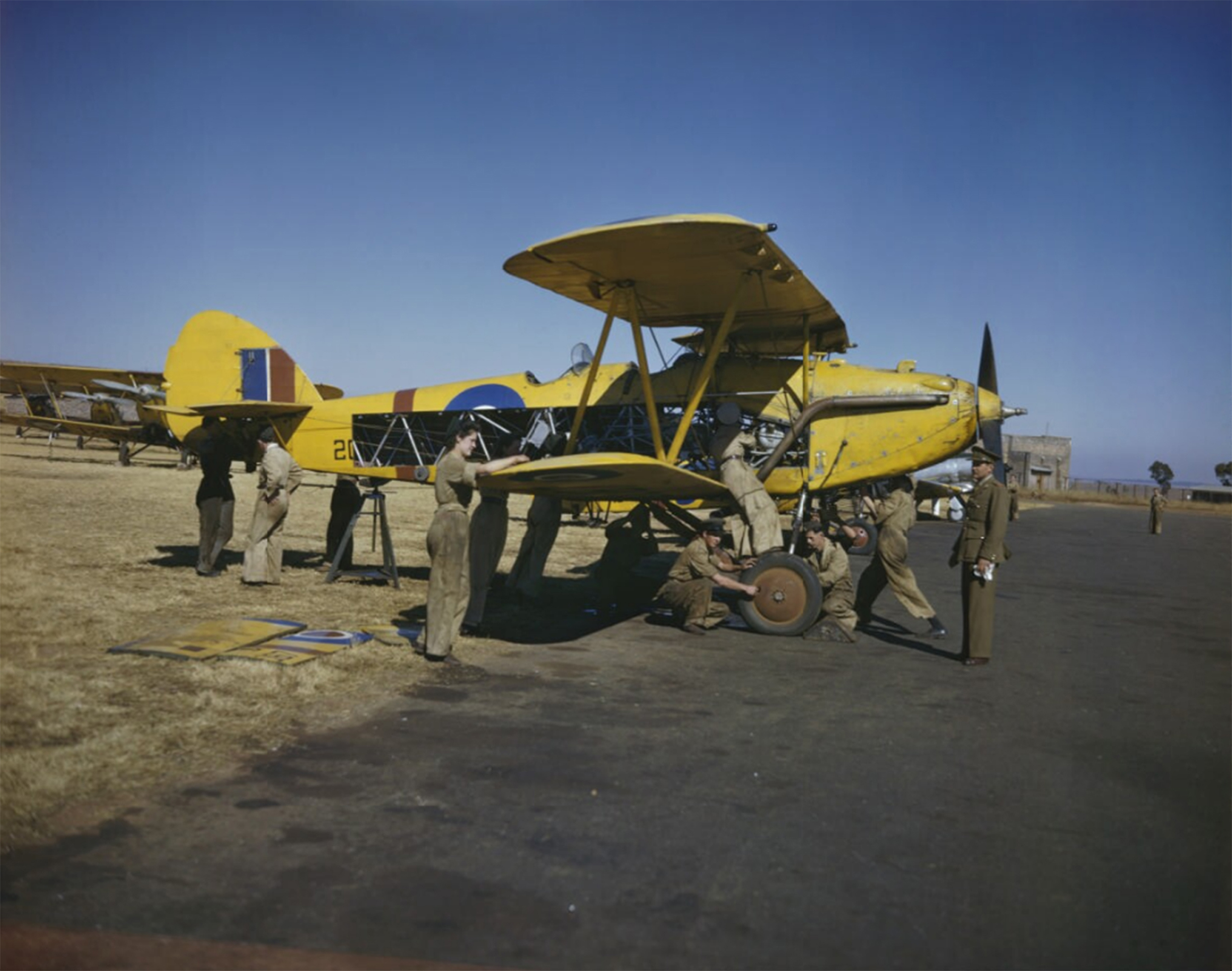
The Hawker Hart, on which Finucane trained.

Within days, Finucane had taken to the skies with his instructor, flying the de Havilland Tiger Moth trainer. Finucane was slow to come to grips with handling the aircraft and he suffered a series of mishaps. During his training, on 7 September, he nearly flew into an airfield boundary hedge. He struggled with landing. Four days later, his tyre burst on a landing approach. The Moth bounced up into the air and Finucane barely recovered to make a heavy landing, although this time he was praised by his instructor. As they climbed out, they saw that the landing gear had been destroyed. Further heavy contact, said Finucane, "[and] there would have been no more Brendan or Mr. Morris!"

Roland Morris was an experienced instructor, with more than 2,000 hours. He was critical of Finucane's habit of trying to force the aircraft to do what he wanted, instead of coaxing it. Despite a series of blunders, Finucane wanted to fly solo. At that time, Finucane was five hours flight training behind the rest of his group, but he made a successful solo trip on 21 September, after the completion of 14:05 hours piloting. The flight was not without fault; Finucane nearly stalled the aircraft after taking off.

Finucane was now one of the 45 pilots in his class to have completed 100 hours of piloting time on aircraft since joining the RAF. After completing basic flight training on 28 October 1938, Finucane was classed as an average pilot, but deemed to be competent enough to be assigned to advanced flying school. With effect from the following day, he was granted a short-service commission as an acting pilot officer (on probation) and sent to 8 Flying Training School, RAF Montrose in Scotland. On 12 November, he left King's Cross railway station travelling on the Flying Scotsman to Glasgow, arriving at Montrose after a 10-hour journey.

At Montrose, Finucane struggled with the more powerful Hawker Hart which was used for advanced training. His positioning in the air was poor and he struggled to hold a good landing pattern. One of his instructors remarked, "the ground was never quite where Paddy expected it to be!" After failing a test with Squadron Leader Dickie Legg, his situation was reviewed. Legg was persuaded to keep him after Finucane showed improvement and a steely determination.

Finucane moved on to the Hawker Fury on 21 March 1939. On 23 June, he was classed as average again, but with low marks: 2,010 out of 3,400 or 59 per cent. Pilot ability was assessed as 400 out of 750; officer qualities 450 of 750; and in the written exams 837 of 1,300. Examined in navigation, meteorology, engine mechanics, and armament, he achieved marks of 77, 54, 50, and 65 percent. At this time, he flew radio-controlled aircraft for the Targeting Section. On 10 July, he crashed a Queen Bee on a transport flight to Gosport in bad weather, which did not improve his standing as a pilot. He escaped with a cut thumb. On 29 August, he was re-graded as a pilot officer (on probation), with the service number 41276.

== Second World War ==
Finucane spent the winter of 1939–40 gaining as much flight practice as possible. He was unable to gain any hours in fighter aircraft. He was abruptly transferred to the practice and parachute test flight centre at RAF Henlow. He had to settle for making trips around airfields in an antiquated Vickers Virginia, as a co-pilot ferrying engineers and ground crew from 16 September 1939. That month German forces invaded Poland on 1 September, prompting Britain and France to declare war on Germany, and beginning the war in Europe. Finucane's piloting skills were far from being at the acceptable level for a fighter pilot. He continued in this trend until May 1940, when he was assigned to flying Miles Magister training aircraft.

In May, German forces began the Battle of the Netherlands and the Battle of Belgium which fell quickly. In June France collapsed. Fighter Command now needed an influx of pilots, after losses in Western Europe. Finucane's flying had improved and on 27 June 1940, he was posted to 7 Operational Training Unit (7 OTU), at RAF Hawarden near Chester. Finucane was to convert onto Supermarine Spitfires, while awaiting a fighter squadron posting. Finucane made his first flight in a Spitfire on 3 July 1940 and made 26 such flights in nine days. The pilots were tested on radio transmission, handling, formation flying and aerobatics. On 11 July 1940 he was permitted just one firing practice. At the end of his stay at 7 OTU, he had logged 2 hours 40 minutes on the Magister, 2 hours 25 minutes on the Fairey Battle, 15 minutes on the Hawker Hurricane and 22 hours and 20 minutes on the Spitfire.

=== Battle of Britain ===
Finucane was posted to No. 65 Squadron at RAF Hornchurch on 12 July 1940, arriving the next day, just as the Battle of Britain was getting under-way. No. 65 Squadron boasted several aces, including Bill Franklin who had destroyed 10 enemy aircraft. Finucane called him the scruffiest man in the squadron, but was envious of Franklin's skill and was keen to emulate him. Anxious to get more experience, Finucane loitered around dispersal hoping to build up flight time on the Spitfire by asking as many senior officers for as many hours practice as was possible. Finucane was granted a few flights to improve his handling of the fighter before he was assigned to B Flight or Green Section.

On 24 July, the squadron moved to a satellite airfield RAF Rochford in Essex. The following day, he became operational. The Battle of Britain was slowly escalating and air fighting increased with a series of German air attacks against British shipping in the English Channel, a phase of the battle termed Kanalkampf by the Luftwaffe. Finucane's first scramble came on 25 July 1940. Flying Spitfire N3128 code YT-W, he took off at 08:45. The Spitfire was worn, having served in combat since April. It developed a glycol leak whilst climbing and the cockpit filled with escaping vapour from the cooling liquid condensing on the hot engine. Suddenly his radio transmission failed. Still, he managed a wheels-up landing at Rochford. 65 Squadron was in action again at 12:20 and engaged enemy aircraft but suffered no losses.

For the next few days, Finucane did not scramble. On 1 August, he was assigned Spitfire R6818 which had been taken on charge by the unit on 26 July. On 12 August, he took off to intercept a raid at 11:30. Climbing to 26,000 feet (7,900 m), 10 miles (16 km) off North Foreland, the squadron attacked 30 Messerschmitt Bf 109s several thousand feet below them. Evading a German counterattack Finucane dived upon a formation of 12 enemy fighters. He fired from 250 to 50 yd (229 to 46 m), causing one Bf 109 to crash into the Channel. The victory was witnessed by Sergeant Orchard in Finucane's flight. He landed at 11:45. While the squadron was refuelling and assembling for another patrol at RAF Manston, the airfield came under a low-level attack by Messerschmitt Bf 110s and Dornier Do 17s covered by Bf 109s. The Bf 110s were led by Hauptmann Walter Rubensdörffer, commanding Erprobungsgruppe 210. 18 Do 17s from Kampfgeschwader 2 supported them. Not many of the Spitfires got airborne. Alongside Jeffrey Quill, Finucane took off downwind as the first bombs started to fall. Both Quill and Finucane sighted Bf 109s and engaged. Quill hit a Bf 109 and Finucane fired on two, claiming a probable and one damaged. According to another account Quill had taken off without permission when he heard reverberations to his right. He saw a hangar roof with a mountain of earth flying sky-ward and a Bf 110 pulling out of a dive. He fired at, but missed, a Bf 109. One Spitfire was damaged in the attack. Finucane's first claim may be one of two III./Jagdgeschwader 54 Bf 109s shot down over the Channel by an unknown British fighter unit. One pilot was unhurt, the other, a Leutnant Eberle was wounded in action. No losses for Bf 109s were incurred on the second air battle.

On 13 August, the Luftwaffe began an all-out assault on RAF airfields. Christened Adlertag (Eagle Day), the raids saw the heaviest fighting thus far. Scrambling at 16:00 to intercept an incoming raid near Dover, 65 Squadron encountered large numbers of Bf 109s from Jagdgeschwader 51 led by Hannes Trautloft. Finucane claimed a Bf 109 shot down and damaged another, leaving the Messerschmitt streaming smoke. Finucane lost contact with it in cloud and he claimed as a probable. One Bf 109 was lost from JG 51 and the pilot wounded. Two more were 80 percent damaged. 65 Squadron suffered no losses. On 18 August Finucane was involved in the large air battles that characterised the campaign. 65 Squadron engaged Heinkel He 111 bombers from Kampfgeschwader 1 downing one of their number.

On 28 August, the squadron was moved to RAF Turnhouse near Edinburgh to rest, having lost two pilots killed in action, one missing in action and four Spitfires between 14 and 27 August. While at Turnhouse, on 3 September, Finucane was confirmed in his rank and promoted to flying officer. A squadron report on 9 September noted that Finucane was learning quickly and showing signs of becoming an efficient combat leader; "I have great hopes of this officer. He is keen and intelligent and shows likelihood of becoming a very efficient leader. Is being trained as a leader and is learning quickly."

65 Squadron remained in the battle until its end in October 1940, but Finucane gained no further successes. On 8 November the unit transferred to RAF Leuchars and then on 29 November back to No. 11 Group RAF in the south at RAF Tangmere near Chichester in West Sussex. The squadron remained idle for the winter as The Blitz and the German night attacks began and lasted in to the following spring. Finucane billeted near Oving. While drinking at a nearby pub, overlooking the harbour, an air raid began on Southampton. Finucane heard the drone of German bombers over the Isle of Wight in the distance and watched as the pathfinders marked the city. They clambered into a Wolseley Hornet two-seater car and headed into the town to seek out acquaintances of a squadron-mate. After seeing the destruction in the city Finucane said "Until this war is won we must shoot every Jerry from the sky."

=== Channel Front ===
By early 1941, the Luftwaffe rarely appeared in daylight and Finucane spent most of his operational time patrolling the Channel coast. On 4 January 1941 at 09:50 off Selsey Bill, he caught and shot down a Bf 110 at 7,000 feet (2,100 m). It took 15 minutes and four attacks to bring it down. The Bf 110 crashed into the Channel. Off St. Catherine's Point on 19 January, Finucane was one of two Spitfires that intercepted a Junkers Ju 88 at 17,000 feet (5,200 m). They chased the Ju 88 to within 5 miles (8.0 km) of Cherbourg and broke off for lack of fuel. They left the Ju 88 on fire in both engines and flying at 50 feet. The pilot had proven a skilful opponent. The Ju 88 flew low-level skidding turns and into the sun where the glare prevented the British pilots from gaining a clear view. The rear gunner was also firing accurately, hitting Finucane's fighter with a few well-placed rounds. The Ju 88 was credited as shared destroyed. The share was with Sergeant H. Orchard.

In November 1940 Air Marshal Sholto Douglas became Air Officer Commanding (AOC) RAF Fighter Command. On 8 December 1940 a directive from the Air Staff called for Sector Offensive Sweeps. It ordered hit-and-run operations over Belgium and France. The operations were to be conducted by three squadrons to harass German air defences. On 10 January 1941 'Circus' attacks were initiated by sending small bomber formations protected by large numbers of fighters. The escalation of offensive operations throughout 1941 was designed to draw up the Luftwaffe as Douglas' Command took an increasingly offensive stance. Trafford Leigh-Mallory, AOC 11 Group, promulgated Operations Instruction No. 7, which he had written on 16 February. Leigh-Mallory outlined six distinct operations for day fighters: 'Ramrod' (bomber escort with primary goal the destruction of the target); 'Fighter Ramrod' (the same goal where fighters escorted ground-attack fighters); Roadstead (bomber escort and anti-shipping operations); Fighter Roadstead (the same operation as Roadstead but without bombers) along with Rhubarb and Circus operations.

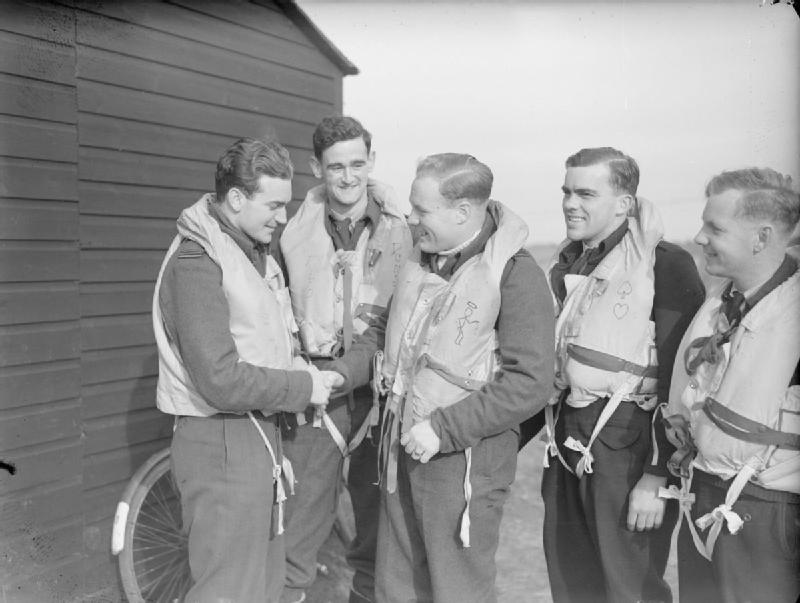
Finucane (left) and Keith Truscott after a successful sortie, October 1941

On 5 February, Finucane participated in the third Circus operation. 65 supported 610 and 302 Squadron over Saint-Omer. Leading high cover, Finucane claimed another Bf 109 over Cap d'Alprech as three German fighters attempted to attack the other squadrons from behind. It was seen to crash into woodland. On 26 February 1941, 65 Squadron was posted to Kirton in Lindsey. The airfield was located in Lincolnshire in No. 12 Group RAF's sector where air-to-air combat was very uncommon in daylight. The stay at Lindsey was short. On 14 April 1941, Finucane was posted as a Flight Commander to the newly formed Australian No. 452 Squadron RAAF, the first RAAF squadron to serve in Fighter Command. He was promoted to acting flight lieutenant the same day.

The following day, 15 April, he flew his final sortie with 65 Squadron flying support for 266 Squadron and 402 Squadron. On the way back in the afternoon he claimed one Bf 109 destroyed. This, his fifth victory, made him an official fighter ace. However, according to other accounts, only two Bf 109s were involved in the brief air battle. Finucane's and 65's likely opponents in the battle was Adolf Galland, Geschwaderkommodore (wing commander) Jagdgeschwader 26 and future General der Jagdflieger (General of Fighter Forces). Galland had taken off with his wingman and a crate containing lobster loaded into the fuselage of his Bf 109 to deliver to Jagdfliegerführer 2 Theo Osterkamp for his birthday at Luftflotte 2 headquarters. En route, Galland took a detour over the English coast and attacked several flights of Spitfires, claiming two 266 squadrons shot down. Galland's landing-gear fell down during the battle, possibly leading Finucane to claim it as destroyed. Both German pilots returned to France, their machines undamaged. Finucane was awarded the Distinguished Flying Cross (DFC) on 25 April.

Finucane's start at No. 452 was unimpressive. On 3 May 1941 while on a recognition flight with his new commanding officer, Squadron Leader Roy Dutton, Finucane got too close and his propeller sliced through Dutton's tailplane. Finucane radioed Dutton immediately. Dutton attempted to abandon the aircraft but was too low and crash-landed, cracking several ribs but surviving. Finucane excused himself from error asserting that his Spitfire was the only one with a metal propeller—the others being elder Mark I's with wooden mounts—which gave him extra speed. In tight formation, this had caused the collision. Despite the incident, he was gazetted on 13 May and given temporary command of the squadron while Dutton was injured. While at 452 Finucane became a popular commander and encouraged a more relaxed atmosphere, which he believed would help him get more out of the Australian pilots. He was now in command of 23 pilots, 16 fighters and 130 ground crew.

The squadron re-equipped with Mk. II's in May 1941 and Finucane was assigned serial P8038, formerly of No. 303 Squadron RAF, on 21 May. It was the first of four Spitfires to carry the shamrock emblem as his personal insignia. Jimmy Firth, his airframe rigger and 'Speedy' Moore, a Canadian engine fitter, were attempting to put an outline of the design on. Poorly done, it attracted the attention of Maurice Pownhall, a professional in lithography. Using green dope he completed the emblem on the forward left part of the cockpit fairing panel. Finucane approved and the shamrock stayed.

Brendan Finucane's Spitfire, with a shamrock marking his initials. It was nicknamed The Flying Shamrock.

On 11 July 1941 Fighter Command conducted Circus Number 44. 12 Group flew as the lower echelon with Spitfire squadrons 452, 65 and 266. Two 11 Group wings from RAF Biggin Hill encompassing 72, 92 and 609 Squadrons and the incomplete RAF Kenley wing with 485 and 602. There was so much competition in the squadron to fly on its first Circus operation that Finucane had to draw lots. The squadron re-fuelled at West Malling after staging down to the coast through England. Flying as the middle-squadron at 18,000 ft Finucane's flight crossed the coast east of Dunkirk at 14:45 GMT. Over Poperinghe the wing split into four groups and headed to Cassel. The sole charge was a Bristol Blenheim of No. 60 Group RAF which was to act as a decoy. Five miles west of Lille at 15:00 GMT they were engaged by elements of Jagdgeschwader 2 and JG 26. Finucane engaged 8 Bf 109s and other units engaged three flights of 10 Bf 109s in total. Finucane was able to position himself behind a straggler after firing 90 rounds the Bf 109 was hit and the pilot bailed out. Fighter Command claimed seven destroyed, two probably destroyed and seven damaged for three Spitfires. Circus 45 took place 40 minutes later. Finucane's success was the first victory for the squadron.

=== Kenley Wing ===
On 21 July 452 was moved to Kenley on a plateau near Kenley Common just south of London in East Surrey. There it joined 602 (City of Glasgow) and 485 (New Zealand) Squadron. These fighter units were to form the nucleus of the new Kenley Wing. From here, they were to fly many intensive operations over the summer period. The squadrons were bolstered by experienced Non-commissioned officers but were relatively inexperienced units. One of them, 602, was commanded by the seasoned Squadron Leader Al Deere. While there Finucane developed a friendship with the Australian pilot Keith Truscott, who joined 452 in May 1941. The two frequented Oddenino's restaurant on Regent Street, a favourite among pilots in blacked-out London. Lew Stone the dance band leader played there. One evening he met Jean Woolford who was to become his fiancé. Whatever time Finucane could spend on leave was spent in Kew Gardens or Richmond Park with her.

After a period of air-to-air exercises and practice the Wing undertook a Circus operation on 3 August 1941. In the evening the Wing crossed out over RAF Manston at 18,000 ft and then dropped to 13,000 ft over the coast at Gravelines and set course for Saint-Omer. Near Ambleteuse five Bf 109Fs were sighted one thousand feet above and in front travelling past the Spitfires. The German fighters shadowed the flight before three detached and dived to attack, curving in from behind. The Spitfires turned into them. Finucane missed with his first burst of fire and chased the leading Bf 109 into cloud while following the Bf 109's condensation trail. Hitting the enemy with another burst from 200 yards the Bf 109 burst into flames. He sighted another formation of 18 Bf 109s above and climbed to attack supported by six Spitfires. Finucane scored hits on the tail unit of one which went down vertically and into a cloud layer at 2,000 ft at which point contact was lost. Finucane claimed one destroyed and one probably destroyed. The operation elevated his tally to 7. The day was best remembered in Fighter Command for the loss of Flight Lieutenant Eric Lock who was shot down by ground-fire in the morning patrol.

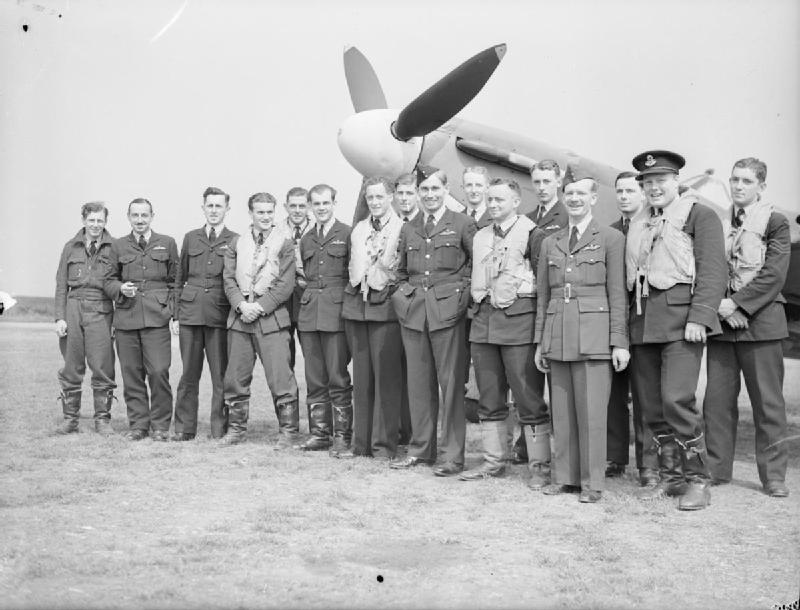
452 Squadron, 1941. Finucane is fourth from left.

On 9 August Finucane was involved with Circus 68 in which five Wings escorted five Blenheims from No. 2 Group RAF to a power station at Gosnay four miles south-west of Béthune. Kenley's three squadrons shared the target support role with Tangmere Wing 610, 616 and 41 Squadrons led by Wing Commander Douglas Bader. The escort wing was 71, 222, and 111 squadrons from North Weald and the escort cover wing was 403, 603 and 611 from Hornchurch while Northolt Wing committed 306, 308 and 315. With thick cloud cover they abandoned the Gosnay operation and moved to a secondary target at Gravelines. The Luftwaffe provided severe resistance and large air battles developed over the coast. Finucane and 452 were positioned as the lower squadron in the Kenley Wing at 20,000 ft with Finucane leading 'A' Flight—a section of four Spitfires. Over Saint Omer at 11:32 Finucane engaged eight Bf 109s and with a long four-second burst of machine gun and cannon-fire from 100 yards one of the Messerschmitts caught fire and went into a spin. Finucane then shared two others with Keith Chisholm. The squadron lost three pilots—Jay O'Bryne became a prisoner of war while Barry Haydon and Geoff Chapman were shot down. Bader was also captured after being shot down by friendly-fire.

Over the next few days 452 re-equipped with Spitfire VBs which had two Hispano-Suiza HS.404 calibre cannon in each wing to supplement four 7.7 mm (0.303 in) Browning machine guns. Finucane chose AB852 because it had the code W adorned on the fuselage. The Spitfire that Finucane damaged in the collision with Dutton earlier also had this letter. Superstition compelled him to fly with a W-decorated fighter for good luck. On Saturday 16 August 1941 Finucane celebrated his greatest success in this machine. Circus 73 began at 07:25, and once again the wing was sent to Saint Omer. Near Gravelines eight to ten Bf 109s engaged 485 squadron. At the customary 100 yards a two-second burst—his second—put the first enemy aircraft into a spin. Pilot Officer Truscott witnessed it diving steeply at 1,000 ft and spinning. At midday 452, 602 and 485 participated in Circus 74 but made no claims. At 17:45 Circus 75 yielded another response from the Luftwaffe. Kenley performed the role of escort wing. Eight Bf 109s engaged at 9,000 ft and 452 claimed seven. Finucane engaged one which caught fire and emitted a lot of white smoke. He then opened fire on another from 10 yards after his gun sight failed. The Bf 109 lost its tail unit. The day's successes were victory numbers 9, 10 and 11.

I owe a great deal to Paddy Finucane. He coached me in air fighting and taught me everything I needed to know, both before and after we started ops.

— Keith Truscott reflecting on his time with 452.

On 19 August Circus 81 once again targeted the Gosnay power station escorting six 2 Group Blenheims. JG 2 and JG 26—the only Luftwaffe wings in the west—reacted. A series of dogfights started at 18,000 ft and ended near 4,000 ft. Finucane claimed one destroyed and one probable. One fell near Gosnay the other was left pouring black smoke at only 500 ft in the Calais area. Truscott claimed a third but 452 lost two pilots—Bill Eccleton and Dick Gazzard. The squadron attracted attention through its successes and Sholto Douglas visited them on 21 August. The following day Finucane was awarded a Bar to the DFC. The citation read, "Flight Lieutenant Finucane has been largely responsible for the fighting spirit of the unit." Circus 85 on 27 August 1941 was meant as an escort mission but the Blenheims of No. 139 Squadron RAF arrived at the rendezvous 30 minutes early and veered off to England. Four wings crossed the coast at 07:12 at 18,000 ft. The Germans reacted and there followed a large air battle which the squadron claimed four Bf 109s—two by Finucane. 452 Squadron were now the most successful in Fighter Command in August.

Finucane took leave in early September and his award for a second Bar was gazetted on 9 September. Circus 100B was flown on 20 September 1941. A three-pronged attack was planned involving 23 squadrons and 270 Spitfires with bomber units acting as decoys. The Kenley wing was to provide escort for bombers hitting marshalling yards at Abbeville. 452 was one of three squadrons flying high cover. Immediately after crossing the coast at Saint-Valery-sur-Somme they were engaged by enemy aircraft. Finucane hit a Bf 109 which exploded forcing him to fly through the debris but within minutes 452 had lost three Spitfires. Finding himself and his wingman, Sergeant Chisholm alone he shot down a Bf 109 that attempted to attack his squadron-mate. He followed it briefly and it caught fire while emitting white smoke. Another Bf 109 turned in to attack Finucane but was shot down by Chisholm. Fighting their way back to the Channel Finucane dived and shot down a Bf 109 which went into a spin before he lost sight of it at approximately 500 ft. Three successes had inflated Finucane's tally to 17.

=== In command ===
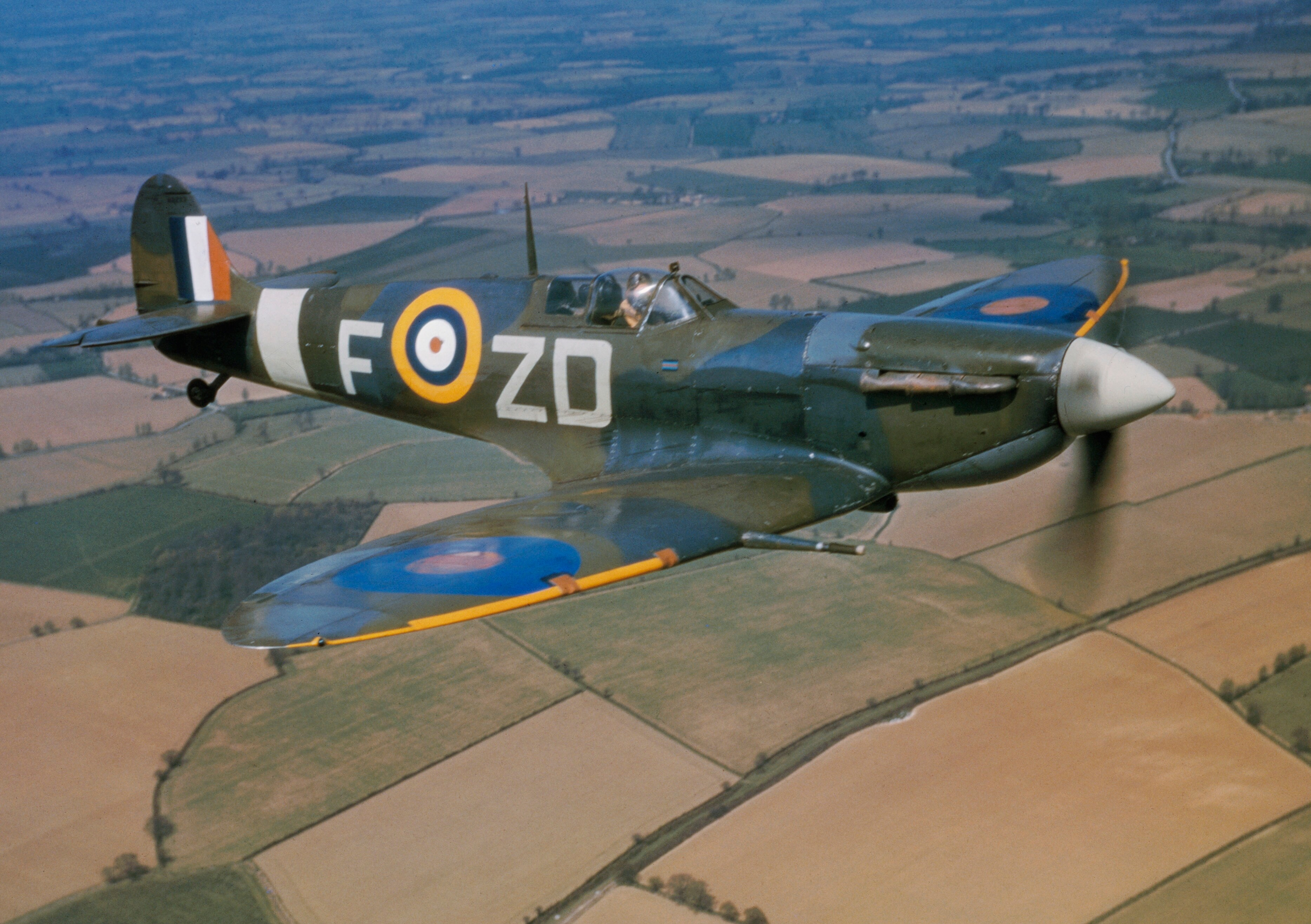
The Spitfire V. Finucane flew these from mid-1941.

The success of 452 and its highest scoring pilot Brendan Finucane brought fame and publicity and information about the squadron's exploits was released by the Air Ministry to the press. That same day, Sunday 21 September 1941, 452 escorted Blenheims to Gosnay once more on Circus 101. 452 met resistance and Bf 109s engaged the Wing. Finucane claimed two at around 15:25 GMT. Chisholm witnessed the first one explode and the second victory burst into flames and dived out of control. The Air Ministry released the details of the operation to the press that night. The Daily Herald had planned to use the headline "Finucane wants 3 for his 21st – 21 for his 21st birthday". Editions were changed overnight to "Finucane wants one more". The Daily Mail, a believer in publishing fighter pilots' exploits since World War I, ran the headline "Spitfire Finucane shoots down 20 Nazis" [sic]. Most of the headlines carried pictures of the squadron in the aftermath of Circus 100B and the stories elevated Finucane to national hero status.

On 2 October 1941, 452 Squadron was joined by 485 from Kenley. The Tangmere Wing's 41, 616 and 129 Squadrons followed to participate in another Circus operation. These formations flew from Mardyck to Boulogne at 22,000 ft to tempt the Luftwaffe to send fighter units into battle. III./JG 26 scrambled to intercept with a staffel (squadron) of Bf 109s. Engaging in battle Finucane shot the wing off one Messerschmitt Bf 109 and damaged another while a third attacked him and was promptly dispatched into the Channel. Finucane followed it down to 6,000 ft but could not ascertain the result because he was attacked by five Bf 109s. A series of barrel rolls and steep climbing turns effected his escape. The engagement took place approximately three miles from the French coast. Upon returning the airfield Finucane's Spitfire was painted to include his initials on the shamrock and 21 Swastika emblems encircling it. Finucane was not pleased with the decoration and ordered it removed. On 4 October he was given temporary command of the squadron when his commanding officer went on leave. On 11 October, he was awarded the Distinguished Service Order (gazetted 21 October) for 21 enemy aircraft shot down.

The next day Circus 107 took place and 452 participated. Blenheims attacked the port of Boulogne protected by 19 squadrons from six wings. Between Le Touquet and mid-Channel at 12:20 the RAF formations were engaged by approximately 50 Bf 109s. Finucane falsely claimed a Bf 109 S.W. Le Touquet 12.22-40 hrs. at 20,000 ft., but it was his no. 2 Sgt Roderick Aeneas Chisholme (Red 2) in Spitfire Mk.VB W3520, who bailed out and was captured. He was shot down either by Hptm. Seifert or Priller, both Luftwaffe Experten. Chisholm escaped in 1942 and spent the next three years evading recapture through Poland, Nazi Germany and France to Paris until the city was liberated in 1944. On 12 October 1941 Circus 108A yielded two victories—one over Saint Omer and another just out to sea off Boulogne. Attempting a third attack Finucane hit a Bf 109 in a climbing attack but stalled and had to dive out of the fight. Truscott, according to his own logbook, shot at a German pilot in a parachute. The attack was frowned upon but the Australian argued leaving an enemy to live to fight again was unwise.

The cockpit was awash with blood. It was not until I was feeling a touch sick and dizzy it dawned on me that it was my blood. It made me mad. Good Dublin blood should not be wasted. Just then things began to go black—however I managed to land back at dispersal without a crack–up will never be known.

— Finucane after being wounded in combat with Fw 190s on 20 February 1942.

Circus 108A cost Fighter Command 8 fighters for 15 claims. The squadron celebrated with a night of drinking. Walking back to their quarters Finucane jumped Croydon Town hall's stone balustrade parapet which hid an 18-foot drop the other side which broke his heel bone and put him in hospital for several weeks. Finucane was treated in Horton Hospital which specialised in combat wounds. While recovering Finucane was sent messages of congratulations by Trafford Leigh-Mallory AOC 11 Group. The Air Ministry sought to take advantage of Finucane's reputation by asking him to assist with morale and propaganda activities. On 22 October he read out an Air Ministry-approved description of his service for the BBC radio programme The World Goes By from his hospital bed. Finucane was moved to RAF Halton in Wendover, Buckinghamshire on 14 November 1941. On 22 November he moved to the former luxury Palace Hotel in Torquay. Upon arrival Finucane was asked to leave for London to receive the DSO and two bars to the DFC on 25 November with his brother and parents. That day King George VI personally decorated Finucane at Buckingham Palace.

On 20 January 1942, Finucane was given command of 602 Squadron at RAF Redhill. Five days later Group Captain Victor Beamish arrived as the new station commander. Beamish promoted Finucane instantly to the rank of squadron leader. Beamish had flown in the Battle of Britain and had then been posted to II Group as Group Captain Operations in 1941. Beamish frequently asked for an operational command and eventually Leigh-Mallory relented and gave him Redhill. Beamish was ordered not to fly on operations but usually flew whenever he felt like it. Beamish was killed on operations just two months later. Finucane observed 602's Glasgow traditions by reviving the squadron badge which pictured the Scottish lion rampant in red.

On 12 February 1942 station commander Beamish took off and headed over the English Channel with wingman for an early morning patrol. Reaching mid-Channel they sighted many ships and realised they had over-flown strong German naval forces. The German navy (Kriegsmarine) were in the midst of Operation Cerberus. The naval squadron consisting of the capital ships Scharnhorst and Gneisenau and the heavy cruiser Prinz Eugen along with escorts. The operation ran a British blockade and sailed from Brest in Brittany to their home bases in Germany via the Channel. The Luftwaffe protected the ships with Operation Donnerkeil, an air superiority plan. The British counter-plan, Operation Fuller was put into action at 11:30 after Beamish had landed and reported the enemy position. Within five minutes Finucane was ordered to take-off on a Roadstead operation. Seven of 602 Squadron fired on warships and caught the images on cine gun-camera. The German operation was a success and on 19 February 1942 Finucane was ordered to London with his former squadron-mate Keith Truscott. He gave evidence before the Fuller Enquiry which reported on the failure to prevent the break-out before Air Chief Marshal Edgar Ludlow-Hewitt and Vice Admiral Hugh Binney.

On 20 February 1942 Finucane flew a two-Spitfire sortie to Dunkirk, France. The last few days had been monotonous and Finucane was eager to fly and asked Dick Lewis—a 29-year-old Australian who had put his age down so he was accepted for pilot training—to fly as his wingman. At 10:55 GMT Finucane took off and headed over Manston toward France. Off the coast, they strafed a small ship and turned north to return home. Finucane spotted two aircraft taking off from Mardyck but lost sight of them. Both Spitfires dropped to sea level. Minutes later two enemy fighters came towards them. They were identified as Focke-Wulf Fw 190s. The Fw 190 had a higher performance than the Spitfire V in all departments other than turning circle and was more heavily armed. Finucane scored hits on the first Fw 190's wing but the enemy quickly gained the advantage and Finucane's Spitfire was hit with six machine gun rounds which blew a piece of fuselage into the cockpit and into his leg. Blood loss induced dizziness and Lewis protected his leader from six more astern attacks. In the last attack the two Fw 190s came from opposite directions. Lewis was able to claim one shot down and the other gave up over the mid-Channel. They taxied to 452's dispersal where Finucane passed out after shutting down the engine. On 2 March Finucane went on leave after spending over a week in hospital. No claim or loss was recorded by JG 26, the resident German fighter unit.

Don't ditch her, Truscott. If you are over water and in trouble, bail out. Get out of her fast. She doesn't take to water like a duck; she takes to it like a fish and goes straight down.

— Finucane to Keith Truscott upon his arrival at 452.

Finucane returned to operations on 13 March; 602 had been strengthened by the arrival of Flight Lieutenant James Harry Lacey, an established fighter pilot and ace with considerable combat experience. Lacey commanded several flights in 602 over the spring and summer, 1942. By coincidence, Lacey also ended the war on 28 aerial victories. He flew with Finucane and 602 on Circus 114 which targeted the railway yards at Hazebrouck. Finucane fought an Fw 190 from 23,000 to 8,000 ft. He claimed it shot down and it was witnessed by Sergeant Paul Green. Fighter Command claimed eight for the loss of six. JG 26 recorded no losses in the battle and the Germans issued a communiqué on losses. Air Chief Marshal Charles Portal requested proof from Sholto Douglas to demonstrate Fighter Command's claims were accurate. Douglas issued him with combat reports from the Kenley Wing which stated two German aircraft were seen to hit the ground and one pilot bailed out. These claims cannot be substantiated through German losses. One source records a loss of Bf 109 from I./JG 26.

Finucane claimed three more successes in the spring, one Fw 190 on 26 March while escorting 24 Douglas Boston from 88 and 107 squadrons to attack Le Havre docks; another on 28 March and one Bf 109 and another Fw 190 on 17 May 1942. Four aircraft were claimed as shared, two probably destroyed and four damaged. Life magazine filmed the squadron's sortie on 26 March, as the fighters took off and landed. This operation was significant as Finucane's unit was also making use of gun camera footage to help verify combat claims. Finucane used footage to verify two claims on 2 April. Despite two clear images of two Fw 190s being hit he was credited only with one damaged. 602 had been prompted to use the cameras because the Command thought the squadron's claims were excessive and the pilots were over stating their success. The Air Ministry also accelerated a plan to introduce the Spitfire IX to restore qualitative parity with the Fw 190 which was inflicting many losses against British fighters; primarily through German pilots taking full advantage of its superior performance over the Spitfire V. Finucane took at least one flight in the Spitfire IX, in the personal aircraft of commanding officer W. G. G. Duncan Smith, 64 Squadron, on 26 June 1942.

Finucane had completed 108 fighter operations over France by the fourth week of June 1942. On 27 June, Leigh-Mallory, with the approval of Sholto Douglas, promoted Finucane to wing commander. Finucane became the youngest wing commander in the RAF, and was to lead the Hornchurch Wing. Duncan Smith later said, that though he admired Finucane, he resented the young fighter pilot's appointment and felt as an older, experienced leader, he could have led the wing himself. Duncan Smith also felt the press gave the young pilot too much attention. Nevertheless, the two maintained a cordial relationship. In his short time as wing commander of Hornchurch, Finucane made a few alterations to the formation. The most notable was to tighten flying discipline, loosen formation flying and increase low-level navigation skills.

== Death ==
On 15 July, Finucane was killed at the age of 21 while leading the Hornchurch Wing in a fighter "Ramrod"—ground attack—operation targeting a German Army camp at Étaples, France. Finucane took off with his wing at 11:50. The attack was timed to hit the Germans at lunchtime. Crossing the French coast at Le Touquet, they targeted machine gun positions. Finucane was hit in the radiator at 12:22. His wingman, Alan Aikman, notified him of the white plume of smoke and Finucane acknowledged it with a thumbs up. Standard regulations insisted the wing carry on the mission even if the leader was in trouble. Radio silence was maintained so the enemy radio-interception services would not know a person of importance was hit.

Finucane flew slowly out to sea, talking calmly to Aikman as he glided along in his ailing Spitfire. Finally, approximately 8 miles (13 km) off Le Touquet, he broke radio silence and sent his last message. Aikman, flying alongside Finucane, saw him pull back the canopy, and before taking off his helmet, said "This is it, Butch". It was a well–executed landing, but the waves were difficult to predict and the Spitfire's nose struck the water and disappeared in a wall of spray. Before he hit the water, Aikman and Keith Chisholm of 452 Squadron saw him release, or perhaps tighten, his parachute release harness and straps. If Finucane had released them it is possible he could have been thrown forward onto the gun-sight and killed, or knocked unconscious and drowned.

== Memorials ==
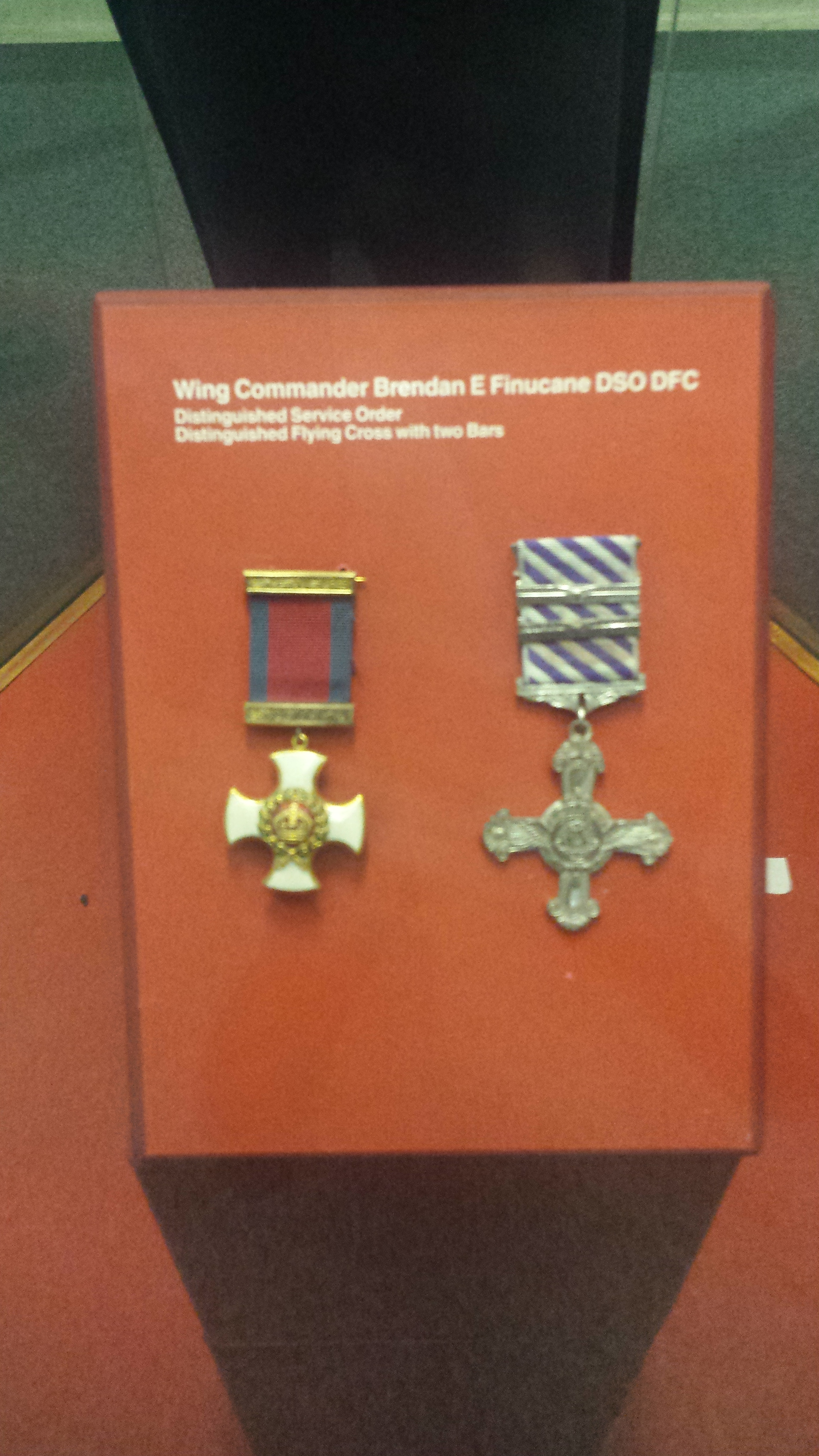
Finucane's medals

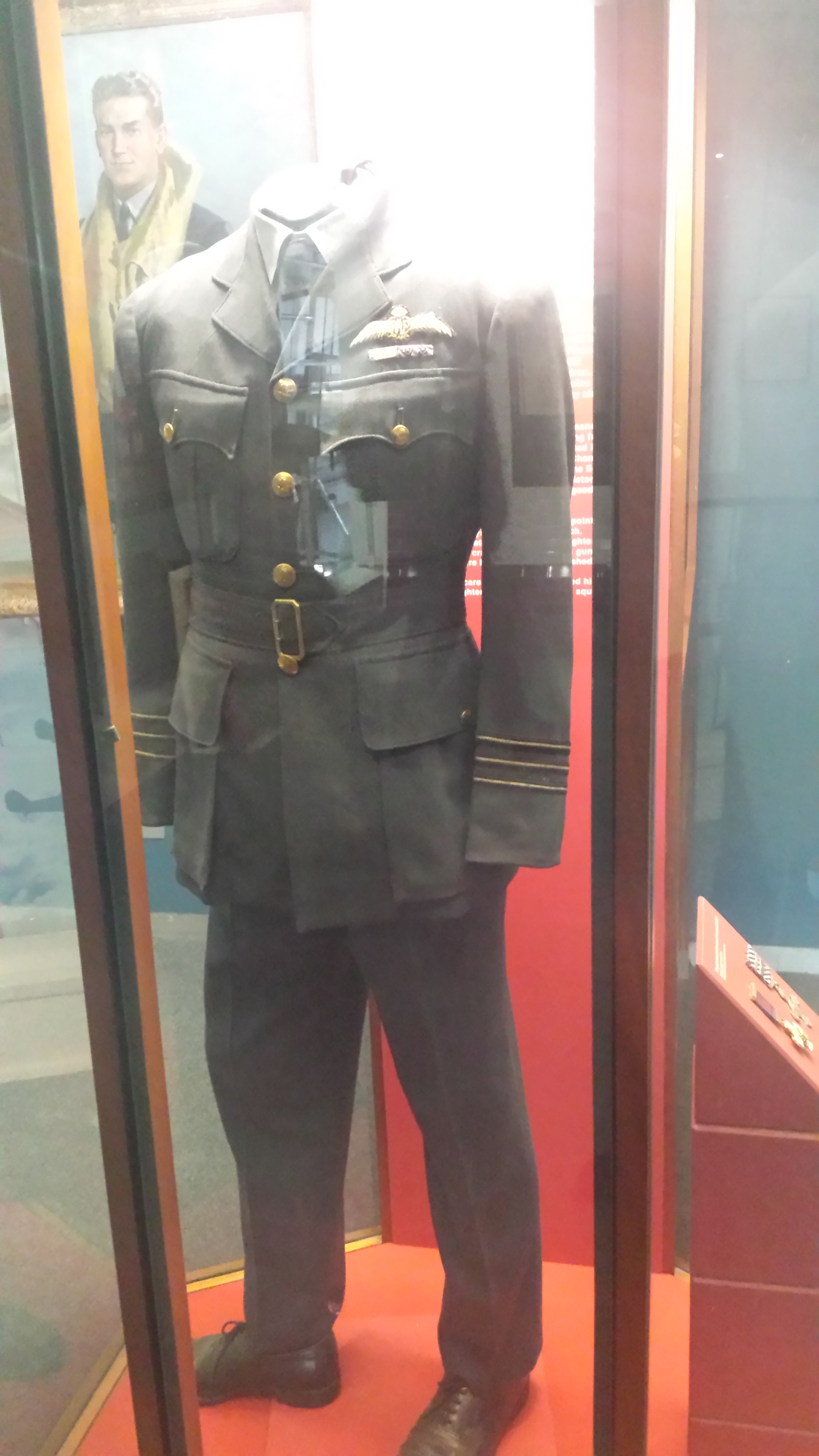
Finucane's uniform

Over 2,500 people attended his memorial at Westminster Cathedral. A rose was planted in the memorial garden in Baldonnel Aerodrome in Dublin (home of the Irish Air Corps) where Brendan and his brother Ray first flew.

Finucane's name is also inscribed on the Air Forces Memorial at Runnymede. The memorial commemorates airmen who were lost in the Second World War and who have no known grave. The Battle of Britain Memorial on London's Embankment also includes his name as one of The Few. A number of streets in Bushey are named after Battle of Britain pilots, including Finucane Rise. There is a small estate, Finucane Court, with a plaque dedicated to him in Richmond, London. The Finucane family donated Brendan Finucane's uniform to the Royal Air Force Museum London.

An oil portrait, "Wing Commander Brendan Finucane (1920–1942), DSO, DFC" by John Thomas Young Gilroy (1898–1985), hangs in the Battle of Britain Hall, Royal Air Force Museum, Hendon. The painting was commissioned after the war by public fund raising in the London Borough of Richmond upon Thames, the place of his family home, and hung for many years in the reception area of Richmond Royal Hospital till gifted to the RAF Museum at Hendon.

The 2024 film, Shamrock Spitfire, starring Shane O'Regan, tells the story of Finucane's life and military career.

== Personal life ==
Finucane and his family worshipped at Our Lady of Loreto and St Winefride's, Kew, where he was an altar server.

He was engaged to Jean Woolford, who lived two doors away from his home in Castlegate, Richmond. She subsequently married, in 1944, another airman, Flying Officer Edward Crang from New Zealand.

== Summary of career ==
=== Air victories ===
RAF Fighter Command claims against the main British opponents in 1941 and 1942—Jagdgeschwader 26 (Fighter Wing 26) and Jagdgeschwader 2 (Fighter Wing 2) —are very difficult to verify. Only two of the 30 volumes of War Diaries produced by JG 26 survived the war. Historian Donald Caldwell has attempted to use what limited German material is available to compare losses and air victory claims but acknowledges the lack of sources leave the possibility for error. From June 1941 to the spring, 1942, Fighter Command claimed 711 enemy aircraft while losing 411. According to available German records, the loss to JG 2 and JG 26 were reportedly 103.

Chronicle of aerial victories
| Claim No. | Date | Location-Time | Type of aircraft | Notes |
|---|---|---|---|---|
| 1. | 12 August 1940 | 12:45 off Margate | One Bf 109 destroyed One Bf 109 probable One Bf 109 damaged | Two Bf 109s from III./Jagdgeschwader 54 (JG 54—Fighter Wing 54) were shot down and reported missing from the first raid whilst over the Channel. It is possible that they fell to No. 615 Squadron RAF also. Leutnant Eberle was wounded. The other pilot is unknown. Finucane claimed his victory over the Channel. |
| 2. | 13 August 1940 | 16:00 off Dover | One Bf 109 destroyed One Bf 109 probable | No. 65 Squadron engaged III./Jagdgeschwader 51 (JG 51—Fighter Wing 51). Four were claimed destroyed. Two Bf 109s were shot down over RAF Manston and one crash-landed back in France, 80 percent destroyed. Two pilots were captured and the third wounded. Pilot names unknown. |
| 3. | 4 January 1941 | 09.50 S of Selsey Bill | One Messerschmitt Bf 110 | This victory appears to have been misidentified. The aircraft was probably a Dornier Do 17, code U5+JK, belonging to I./Kampfgeschwader 2 and flown by Oberleutnant Joachim Rücker. It crash-landed at Epinoy. |
| . | 19 January 1941 | 14:10 off Cherbourg | One Junkers Ju 88 shared destroyed | Ju 88 of II./Kampfgeschwader 76 (KG 76—Bomber Wing 76). Crashed at Ansbach. Feldwebel L. Koch and one other man killed. Aircraft destroyed. |
| 4. | 5 February 1941 | 10 miles (16 km) east of Cap D'Alprech | One Bf 109 destroyed | Jagdgeschwader 3 engaged the operation as it attacked their airfield at Saint-Omer-Wizernes. I. Gruppe claimed three Hawker Hurricanes and three Spitfires without loss. III. Gruppe claimed four Hurricanes and three Spitfires. One III. Gruppe Bf 109 (Werknummer 4172—factory number), piloted by an unknown pilot, sustained 35% damage in aerial combat over Étaples. III./JG 26 claimed one Spitfire without loss. Two Hurricanes were confirmed shot down with another missing. Two more collided. Four Spitfires were lost during the day; all in action with Bf 109s. |
| 5. | 15 April 1941 | 17:00 mid-Channel | One Bf 109 destroyed | Claimed one Bf 109 destroyed at 17:30. It appears that Finucane claimed Adolf Galland shot down. Galland and his wingman, Hans-Jürgen Westphal, returned to base without incident. The JG 26 war diary states that Galland flew a Bf 109F for the first time—Werknummer 6714. Galland's logbook states it was an F-2, but photographic evidence suggests it was an F-0 pre-production variant. The source mentions an RAF pilot claiming him as a victory. Both of Galland's claims were made at 17:50–18:00 CET. |
| 6. | 11 July 1941 | 5 miles (8.0 km) west of Lille | One Bf 109s destroyed | JG 2 lost two pilots killed over Cherbourg and Boulogne. III./JG 26 suffered damage to one Bf 109. There is no mention in the JG 26 War Diary of further losses in men or aircraft. |
| 7. | 3 August 1941 | 7:25–30 miles (48 km) west of Saint Omer west of Saint Omer 7:25–7:30 | One Bf 109 destroyed One Bf 109 probably destroyed | The JG 26 War Diary noted the force–landing of one Bf 109E. No further losses are mentioned for JG 2 or JG 26. |
| 8. | 9 August 1941 | 11:25 Gosnay—Bethune | One Bf 109 destroyed Two Bf 109 shared destroyed | According to German records, 452's opponents on that date were JG 26. The Germans reported two losses. Unteroffizier Albert Schlager was killed. Another pilot parachuted to safety. According to the JG 26 War Diary only two Bf 109s were lost and a number of RAF aces' claims cannot be verified through this record. |
| 9–11. | 16 August 1941 | 08:40 near Gravelines; 18:30 15 miles (24 km) northeast of Boulogne; 18:30 15 miles (24 km) northeast of Boulogne | Three Bf 109s destroyed | Opponents were also from JG 26. Morning victory cannot be identified. In the afternoon I. and II. JG 26 took off to meet the second RAF operation of the day but missed it. JG 2 did intercept and lost three Bf 109s and their pilots. JG 2 and JG 26 met the third operation. JG 2 lost two Bf 109s shot down, one of which was destroyed. Finucane made a claim at 18:30 GMT. At 19:30 CET, the same time, Leutnant Josef Heyarts engaged a Spitfire in a lengthy dogfight and was shot down and killed. |
| 12. | 19 August 1941 | 11:10 Gravelines—Gosnay; 11:10 Gravelines—Gosnay | One Bf 109 destroyed One Bf 109 probably destroyed | The Hornchurch Wing bounced and shot down two Bf 109s from 5. Staffel (Squadron) of II./JG 26. Gefreiter Reinhardt Braun and Feldwebel Franz Schwaiger were killed. |
| 13–14. | 27 August 1941 | 07:20 3 miles (4.8 km) northwest of Gravelines; 07:20 Calais—Gris Nez | Two Bf 109s destroyed | All three Gruppen of JG 26 engaged the early morning circus. Losses not listed in the unit war diary. |
| 15–17. | 20 September 1941 | 15:35 5 miles (8.0 km) northwest of Abbeville; 15:35 5 miles NW of Abbeville; 15:35 5 miles (8.0 km) northwest of Abbeville | Three Bf 109s destroyed | According to the War Diary of JG 26 it suffered no losses. JG 2 lost two pilots killed but no figure is given for the number of aircraft casualties. |
| 18–19. | 21 September 1941 | 15:25 20 miles (32 km) east of Hardelot; 15:25 20 miles (32 km) east of Hardelot | Two Bf 109s destroyed | JG 26 lost Leutnant Ulrich Dzialas 8. Staffel killed but no figure is given for the number of fighters lost. One II./JG 2 Bf 109 belly-landed damaged. |
| 20. | 2 October 1941 | 17:40 15–20 miles (24–32 km) east of Boulogne; 17:40 15–20 miles (24–32 km) east of Boulogne | One Bf 109 destroyed One Bf 109 damaged | The unit opposing Finucane's Squadron was III./JG 2. Three Bf 109F-2s crash-landed after combat. |
| 21. | 12 October 1941 | 12:00 southwest of Le Touquet | One Bf 109 destroyed | JG 2 was involved in air battles on this date. I./JG 2 lost one pilot killed (Lt. Rolf Beyer). |
| 22–23. | 13 October 1941 | 13:18 Saint-Omer—Boulogne; 13:20 Saint-Omer—Boulogne | Two Bf 109s destroyed One Bf 109 damaged | JG 2 claimed no losses. JG 26 suffered two losses. One Fw 190 crash-landed after combat and a Peter Göring was shot down and killed in a Bf 109. According to the War Diary, Göring was shot down by a Bristol Blenheim. |
| . | 20 February 1942 | 11:20–30 Off Calais—Gris Nez | One Fw 190 damaged | |
| 24. | 13 March 1942 | 15:30 E of Griz Nez; 15:30 Griz Nez—Saint Omer | One Fw 190 destroyed One Fw 190 shared destroyed | The Kenley Wing claimed 5 Fw 190s shot down but according to the JG 26 War Diary, III./JG 26 lost no aircraft. |
| . | 14 March 1942 | 17:17 25 miles (40 km) north-northwest of Le Havre | One Ju 88 shared destroyed | |
| 25. | 26 March 1942 | 16:00 north of Le Havre | One Fw 190 destroyed | No Fw 190s were reported lost but I./JG 2 lost two Bf 109F-4s. |
| 26–27. | 28 March 1942 | 17:35 off Gris Nez–Gravelines; 17:35 off Gris Nez–Gravelines; 17:35 off Gris Nez–Gravelines | One Bf 109 destroyed One Fw 190 destroyed One Bf 109 shared destroyed | Kenley Wing claimed 7 victories; One Fw 190 was lost; III./JG 26's Leutnant Johannsen was killed with 7. Staffel. Two Fw 190s were damaged and one pilot wounded in action against Hornchurch Wing Spitfires. |
| . | 2 April 1942 | 14:35 off Saint-Valery-en-Caux | One Fw 190 damaged | |
| . | 10 April 1942 | 17:39 5 miles (8.0 km) southeast of Mardyck | One Fw 190 damaged | Claimed south east of Mardyck at 17:39. Two Fw 190s were recorded lost. 4./JG 26 lost Leutnant Werner Michalski killed in Werknummer 067, "White 5" and 5./JG 26 lost Feldwebel Paul Rieger in Werknummer 037 "Black 2". Both were lost in combat with Spitfires. |
| . | 16 April 1942 | 07:45 south of Mardyck | One Fw 190 damaged | |
| . | 26 April 1942 | 10:37 Mardyck–Gravelines | One Fw 190 shared destroyed | No JG 26 losses listed. |
| . | 28 April 1942 | 11:30 Audruicq | One Fw 190 damaged | |
| . | 30 April 1942 | 11:55 15 miles (24 km) northwest of Le Havre | One Fw 190 probably destroyed | 602 Squadron claimed one destroyed, three probable and one damaged; III./JG 26 lost one Fw 190 and one damaged. |
| 28. | 17 May 1942 | 11:40 Guînes | One Fw 190 destroyed | 602 Squadron claimed two destroyed in total; Two JG 26 Fw 190s force landed with battle damage. |
| . | 8 June 1942 | 13:50 Saint-Omer | One Fw 190 probably destroyed | 602 Squadron claimed two probably destroyed; One JG 26 Fw 190 force landed with combat damage. |

=== Awards ===
- 13 May 1941 – "in recognition of gallantry displayed in flying operations against the enemy" Finucane was awarded the Distinguished Flying Cross

Flying Officer Brendan Finucane (41276)—No. 65 Squadron
This officer has shown great keenness in his efforts to engage the enemy and has destroyed at least 5 of their aircraft. His courage and enthusiasm have been a source of encouragement to other pilots of the squadron.

— London Gazette

- 9 September 1941 – Acting Flight Lieutenant Brendan Finucane DFC (41276) of No. 452 (RAAF) Squadron is awarded a Bar to the Distinguished Flying Cross for gallantry displayed in flying operation against the enemy:

This officer has led his flight with great dash, determination and courage in the face of the enemy. Since July 1941, he has destroyed three enemy aircraft and assisted in the destruction of a further two. Flight Lieutenant Finucane has been largely responsible for the fine fighting spirit of the unit.

— London Gazette

- 26 September 1941 – Acting Flight Lieutenant Brendan Finucane DFC (41276) of No. 452 (RAAF) Squadron is awarded a second Bar to the Distinguished Flying Cross for gallantry displayed in flying operation against the enemy:

This officer has fought with marked success during recent operations over Northern France and has destroyed a further six enemy aircraft. Of these, three were destroyed in one day and two in a single sortie on another occasion. His ability and courage have been reflected in the high standard of morale and fighting spirit of his unit. Flight Lieutenant Finucane has personally destroyed fifteen hostile aircraft.

— London Gazette

- 21 October 1941 – Acting Flight Lieutenant Brendan Finucane DFC (41276) of No. 452 (RAAF) Squadron is awarded a Distinguished Service Order for gallantry displayed in flying operation against the enemy:

Recently during two sorties on consecutive days, Flight Lieutenant Finucane destroyed five Messerschmitt 109's bringing his total victories to at least 20. He has flown with this squadron since June 1941, during which time the squadron has destroyed 42 enemy aircraft of which Flight Lieutenant Finucane had personally destroyed 15. The successes achieved are undoubtedly due to this officer's brilliant leadership and example

— London Gazette
