= Keith Truscott =

Australian rules footballer and flying ace (1916–1943)

Keith William Truscott
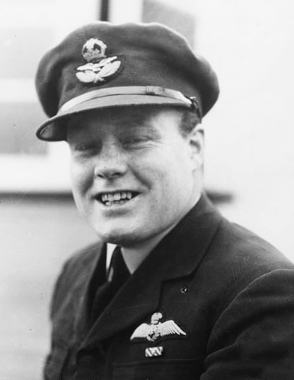
- Truscott c. 1941
- Born: 17 May 1916; South Yarra, Victoria
- Died: 28 March 1943 (aged 26); Exmouth Gulf, Western Australia
- Military career
- Allegiance: Australia
- Branch: Royal Australian Air Force
- Service years: 1940–1943
- Rank: Squadron Leader
- Nickname: "Bluey"
- Unit: No. 452 Squadron (1941–42)
- Commands: No. 76 Squadron (1942–43)
- Conflicts: Second World War; European theatre; South West Pacific theatre; Battle of Milne Bay
- Awards: Distinguished Flying Cross & Bar; Mentioned in Despatches

Keith William "Bluey" Truscott, DFC & Bar (17 May 1916 – 28 March 1943) was a World War II ace fighter pilot and Australian rules footballer with the Melbourne Football Club. After joining the Royal Australian Air Force in 1940, he became the second-highest-scoring Australian World War II ace, credited with 20 confirmed victories and 5 unconfirmed victories.

After completing flying training in Canada, Truscott served in Britain flying Spitfire fighters. He returned to Australia in early 1942 and served in New Guinea, where he fought during the climactic Battle of Milne Bay. He was killed in a joint Australian–US training exercise off the coast of Western Australia in March 1943, aged 26.

== Early life and sporting career ==
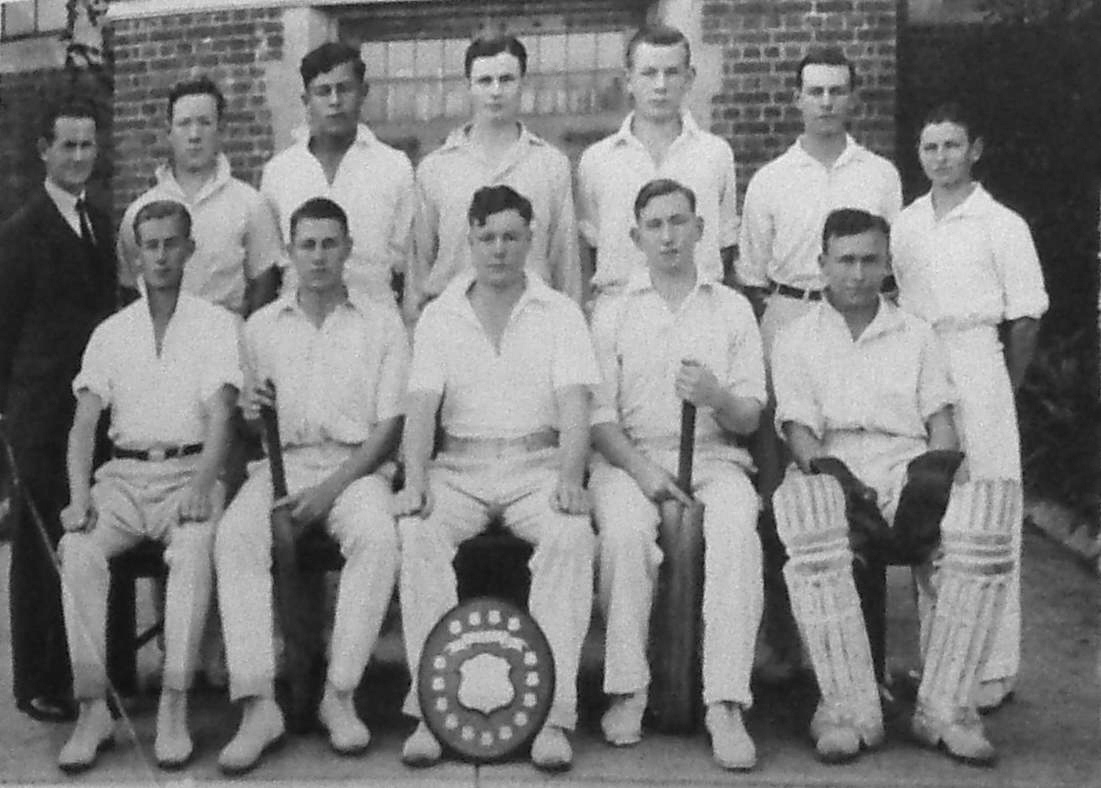
The Melbourne High School cricket team. Miller is standing at right. Truscott is seated with shield.

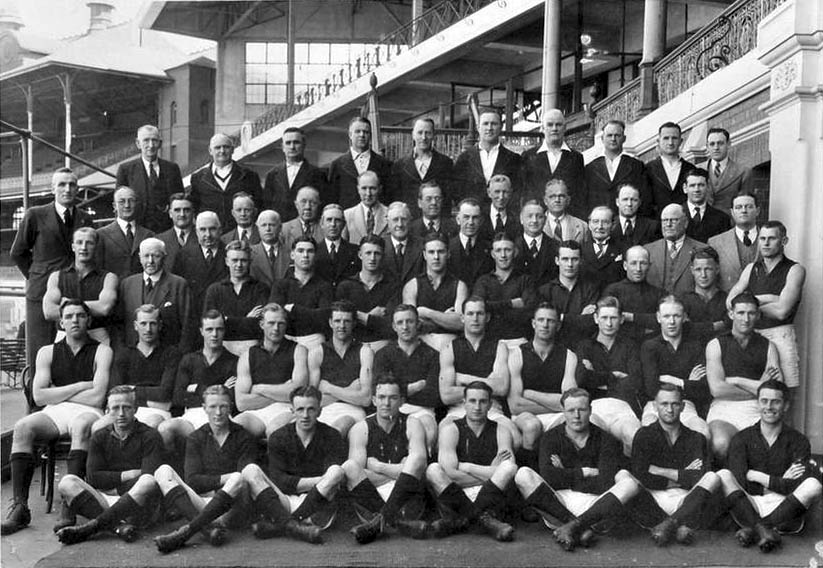
Melbourne Football Club 1940 VFL Premier Team. Truscott front row third from right

Truscott was born in South Yarra, Victoria, on 17 May 1916, to William Truscott and Maude Truscott (née Powell). He attended Melbourne High School, where he captained the First XI in cricket and First XVIII in football as well as being a prefect and house captain. While there, he mentored the young Keith Miller, who entered the First XI at the age of 14 and went on to be regarded as Australia's finest all-round cricketer; both students were taught Mathematics by Test cricketer Bill Woodfull and coached football by Ralph Empey.

Truscott enlisted at the age of 24, a day after his team Melbourne defeated Richmond and with five rounds of football remaining for the year. Melbourne was a favourite to win the 1940 premiership; Jack Dyer stated that this was "the best side Melbourne ever had. They won three Premierships on end and but for the war years they would have shattered Collingwood's record by winning six on end." Consequently, Truscott joining the war effort created significant publicity.

Truscott played 44 games (and kicked 31 goals) of VFL football as a half-forward flanker from 1937 to 1940, playing in Melbourne's 1939 and 1940 premiership victories, taking leave from military duties to play in the 1940 Grand Final in September.

Melbourne Coach Frank 'Checker' Hughes wrote how Melbourne's forward line included "that red-headed bullet, 'Bluey' Truscott". Truscott starred in Melbourne's 1939 Grand Final victory against Collingwood in front of 78,000 people. The Argus reported that Melbourne was down in the first quarter "and only a gallant effort by Truscott redeemed Melbourne"; after kicking a goal in the third quarter, "Truscott reached his greatest heights" and Melbourne went on to win the match. In the 1940 semi-final against Richmond, The Sporting Globe noted that "at half-time Melbourne replaced Norm Smith with Truscott . . . who immediately came into the play, dashingly gathering the ball round the wing and on the angle popping it through for Melbourne’s seventh goal" a match they won by three points.

After being recalled from Britain and before his deployment to the North-Western Area Campaign, Truscott made one final appearance in 1942. Anticipating Truscott's return, the Melbourne Football Club delayed the traditional unfurling of their Premiership flag at the start of the season for the match. Truscott was made Captain for the game against Richmond and wore No.1 on his jumper instead of his usual No.5. Prior to the match, John Wren, one of the country's most notorious racketeers, gifted Truscott with a cheque for £1,000 to share with Paddy Finucane. The money was subsequently not accepted due to King's Regulations prohibiting such gifts.

== War service ==
Truscott worked as a teacher before becoming a clerk at Vestey Group business W. Angliss & Co., where he had also secured a job for his old friend from Melbourne High School Old Boys Association and Lord Somers Camp, Stan Bisset. Bisset and Truscott both agreed to enlist while sharing a beer after work one Friday night. Bisset later recalled that he and Truscott were thinking deeply about the war and that people were giving up everything to participate; they had an intense patriotic feeling towards Britain and decided that it was up to them not to wait for the enemy to come but rather to fight where they had a better chance of winning, "and so that's what we did".

In 1940, Truscott undertook his Initial Training Course, passing the two-month course in one month with Distinction before moving on to No. 3 Elementary Flying Training School RAAF. Truscott was instructed by Pilot Officer Roy Goon who instructed over 800 pilots in his career, and also served as Squadron Leader of No. 83 Squadron.

Truscott was awarded his Wings after completing flight training in Canada under the Australia and the Empire Air Training Scheme graduating 8th from a Class of 52 and passing with Distinction.

=== Royal Air Force ===
Truscott joined No. 452 Squadron flying a RAF Supermarine Spitfire in England on 5 May 1941. Truscott formed a strong and binding friendship with another fighter ace, Wing Commander Paddy Finucane. They formed, according to Ivan Southall, the toughest, ice-cold fighter partnership in the RAF, contributing to what was the highest scoring unit in Fighter Command. By this stage Truscott was, along with Clive Caldwell, one of the most famous RAAF pilots. While in England, his fame was such that he was used as fundraising icon, with the Marquess of Donegall exhorting his countrymen with red hair to donate money to buy a Spitfire in which Truscott, who was nicknamed "Bluey" because of his red hair, would fly.

In 1941, after destroying several Messerschmitts, Truscott's Spitfire had its tail shot off and fuel tanks ruptured. Returning to base, the Spitfire eventually ran out of fuel over the English Channel. Truscott attempted to bale at 4,000 feet but was caught in his cockpit; he broke free only 400 feet above the sea with his chute opening moments before he hit the water.

The ethics of attacks on parachutists was strongly debated during the war. In October 1941, Truscott destroyed two Messerschmitts over occupied France during a series of engagement and one of those pilots managed to bale out. Truscott then shot at the parachutist as he descended. On the squadron's return to RAF Kenley, Truscott's close friend and crew member Clive 'Bardie' Wawn DFC called him "a bastard, [for] shooting at that Jerry". Truscott's reply to Wawn was pragmatic: "He might have gone up tomorrow and shot you down". Truscott had earlier seen a German pilot shooting at a parachuting RAF pilot and vowed to return the favour.

Truscott destroyed at least 16 Luftwaffe Messerschmitt Bf 109s, was twice awarded the Distinguished Flying Cross (invested to him by King George VI), and was promoted to acting squadron leader in January 1942. Citations for Truscott's DFCs refer to "great courage and determination" and that he had shown "fine fighting spirit; destroyed 11, probable destroyed 3, damaged 2 hostile aircraft, attacked and damaged a Destroyer (during the Channel Dash) as well as a German Heinkel He 114." The destroyer Truscott attacked was most likely the Z7 Hermann Schoemann, which was the only destroyer that reported being strafed by 20mm aerial cannon fire on that day. It is believed that this sortie was the first time a fighter squadron had attacked and damaged a warship without assistance.

One of Truscott's more unusual sorties was "Leg Operation", which involved his squadron escorting a Bristol Blenheim to parachute a prosthetic leg into a Saint-Omer hospital where Douglas Bader was being held by the Germans. Bader had lost both legs in 1931 after crashing his plane in an air-show. However, as a fighter ace with some 22 aerial victories, he was well regarded by the Germans, who with the consent of Hermann Göring, agreed to Bader's request to allow the English to parachute in a replacement leg.

=== Royal Australian Air Force ===
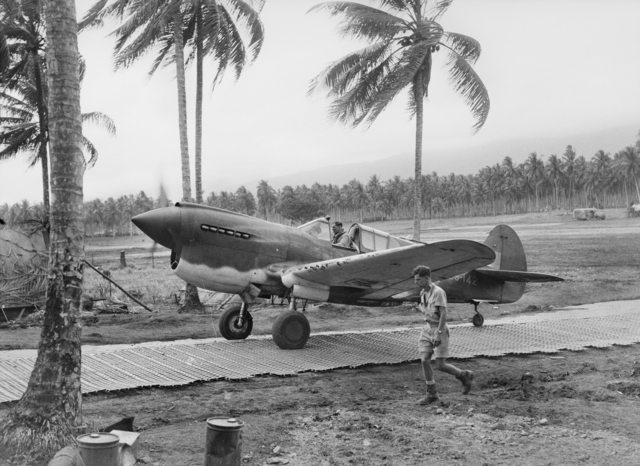
Truscott, Squadron Leader No. 76 Squadron RAAF at Milne Bay, New Guinea, in September 1942.

Truscott was promoted to Commanding Officer in June 1942 before being posted back to the RAAF in Australia after the Bombing of Darwin, and he joined No. 76 Squadron, flying Kittyhawks.

It was RAAF policy that all pilots returning from campaigns abroad must relinquish their ranks. However, political interference saw Truscott retain his rank (and pay) upon his posting to No. 76 Squadron. That placed Truscott in what his Commanding Officer wrote was "an invidious position", and the matter was formally escalated with Group Command. The loss of Squadron Leader Peter Turnbull inadvertently resolved the matter as Truscott was promoted as Turnbull's replacement in January 1943. However, the Minister for Air was publicly forced to review the policy, resulting in a landmark case that saw all pilots able to retain their original ranks.

Truscott's squadron was posted to Gurney Field in Milne Bay, Papua, and played what was described as "the decisive factor" in winning the Battle of Milne Bay. During the battle, Nos. 75 and 76 Squadrons fired 196,000 rounds and wore out 300 gun barrels against ground targets, raking the palm trees at low-levels for snipers. With Japanese troops less than five kilometres from the airstrip, Truscott's pilots were ordered to evacuate to Port Moresby to protect their assets. However, Truscott refused his orders, mindful of how his Ground Crew would feel being left behind after all officers had evacuated. Truscott was subsequently Mentioned in Dispatches for his distinguished service in the battle. An official report notes that Truscott was "literally adored by the Pilots and Ground Crew. His devil-may-care swagger, fiery red mop of hair on which a Melbourne Cricket Club cap was usually perched, and infectious smile just couldn't fail to inspire confidence in others."

No. 76 Squadron was later transferred to Darwin, Northern Territory, and the RAAF journal Wings stated that when out-climbed by Japanese Zeros in early night dog-fights, Truscott would turn on the navigation lights of his Kittyhawk to attract Japanese fire, giving him a chance to shoot back. One night in January 1943, Truscott intercepted three bombers head-on over Darwin and, with just one gun operating effectively, shot down a Betty Mitsubishi G4M.

Truscott was killed on 28 March 1943, during a RAAF training exercise with the US Navy off Exmouth, Western Australia. It had earlier been agreed that the RAAF would launch surprise feint attacks on any US Catalinas they came across along the coast. At Truscott's request, the US agreed to keep their Catalinas well off the water during the exercise. Two days later, Truscott and his wingman, Pilot Officer Ian Loudon (later promoted to squadron leader, and awarded the DFC), sighted PBY Catalina 101-P-1 from Fleet Air Wing 10 in the distance. The conditions of the day were highly unusual: the water was mirror-like creating a false horizon. The Australian echelon prepared for a beam attack at what Loudon thought was a height well over 200 feet (60 m). Due to the weather conditions and distance from the Catalina, Loudon and Truscott were not able to discern that the Catalina was actually in a slow descent preparing to land on the water. With the sun shining in their eyes, it was not until 800 yards (730 m) prior to contact that Loudon realised their true altitude. Loudon radioed Truscott but it was too late; Truscott's P-40E Kittyhawk clipped the water at a flat angle, he immediately pulled-up the aircraft but it stalled at 200 feet (60 m) and fell into the sea, killing Truscott instantly. His body was recovered and he was buried with military honours at Karrakatta Cemetery, Perth.

== Memorials ==
Truscott's life and service were honoured in a number of ways. The RAAF later named a base on the northern coast of the Kimberley region as Truscott Airfield.

Truscott's Spitfire Mark IIa, P7973 "R-H" is on permanent display at the Australian War Memorial.

The Melbourne Football Club's award for the best and fairest player is named in his honour: the "Bluey" Truscott Memorial Trophy.

At Melbourne High School, a scholarship is awarded in his name to a student displaying all-round achievement in academic, sporting, and extra-curricular activities. For reasons unknown, it was discontinued, apparently in 1948. In 1994, John Miller, winner of the 1946/47 Bluey Truscott Scholarship, Principal Ray Willis, and the MHSOBA re-established the Bluey Truscott Scholarship. Miller provided the Bluey Truscott bronze plaque (hanging in the school foyer) and the "John Miller Distinguished Achievement Medal" to be awarded to all subsequent MHSOBA Bluey Truscott winners.

The Prime Minister of Australia Kevin Rudd invoked the story of Truscott in his Battle for Australia Commemorative Committee Speech 2008.

Truscott Street in Thornton, Truscott Street in North Ryde, and Truscott Street in Geelong are also named in his honour.

Truscott, as a boy, appears as a character briefly in the film Smithy (1946).

Truscott is portrayed by Chris Kaye in the 2024 War Film The Shamrock Spitfire

== Honours and awards ==
- 17 October 1941 – Pilot Officer Truscott (400213) was awarded the Distinguished Flying Cross:

Truscott joined Squadron in May after period training in Australia and Canada. Has participated in may operational sorties against enemy and has displayed great courage and determination. Has destroyed at least six enemy aircraft.

- 27 March 1942 – Squadron Leader Truscott (400213) was awarded a Bar to the Distinguished Flying Cross:

Skillful courageous fighter pilot since May 1941 participated large number sorties and convoy escorts. Throughout shown fine fighting spirit. Destroyed eleven, probably destroyed three, damaged two hostile aircraft. In February 1942 Truscott participated in attack on destroyer which left damaged condition black smoke issuing behind bridge. Next day assisted destruction German floatplane.

- 26 March 1943 – Commanding Officer Truscott (400213) was Mentioned in Dispatches

I commend No.76 Squadron for its excellent work in the Milne Bay operations. The 110 sorties carried out by your Squadron in a period of eight days were carried out under very difficult conditions. Even though you were forced to operate from unfinished landing strips and during adverse weather conditions, the organisation successfully carried out these fighter attacks on enemy forces. I am also cognisant of the fact that these operations were completed in the face of the enemy, who had penetrated as far as one of your landing strips and to within a short distance of the other. The courage and determination displayed by the members of your Squadron contributed materially to the defeat and to the eventual withdrawal of the Japanese from this area. 16 October 1942, George Kenney, Major General, Commander

NB: Squadron records from Milne Bay indicate 220 sorties were flown comprising 340 flying hours, of which Truscott flew 60 hours.

Truscott's war service was acknowledged by the following medals:

- Distinguished Flying Cross and Bar (DFC*)
- 1939–1945 Star
- Air Crew Europe Star
- Pacific Star
- Defence Medal
- War Medal 1939–1945 (With oakleaf, signifying Mention in Despatches)
- Australia Service Medal 1939–45
- Mentioned in Despatches
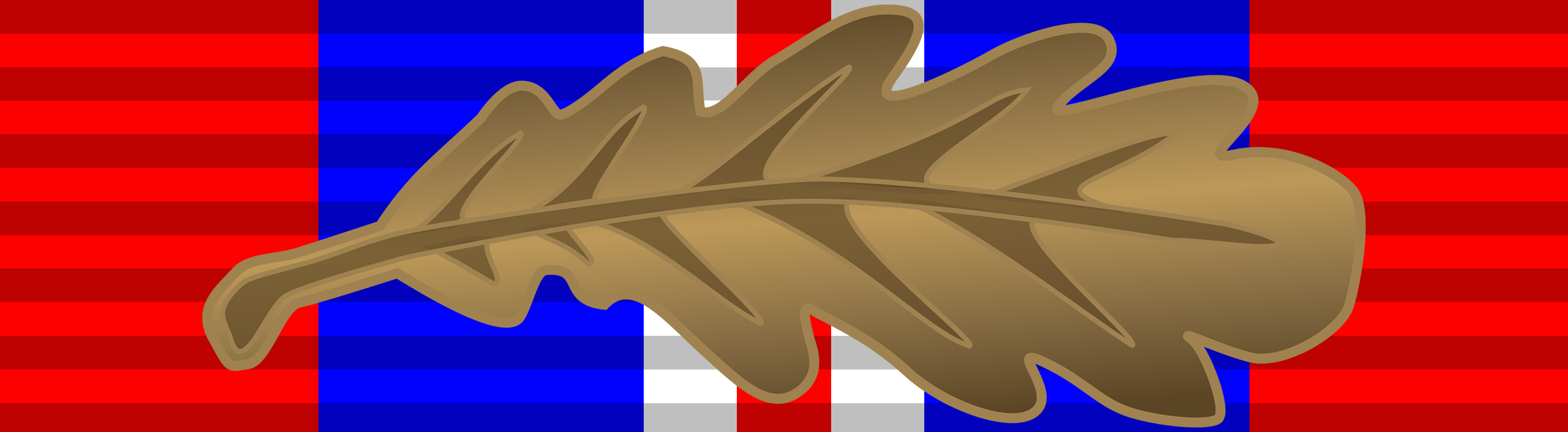

== See also ==
- List of World War II aces from Australia
- List of Victorian Football League players who died on active service
