= Narrow-gauge railways of France =

The French National Railways used to run a considerable number of 1,000 mm (3 ft 3 3/8 in) metre gauge lines, a few of which still operate mostly in tourist areas, such as the St Gervais-Vallorcine (Alps) and the "Petit Train Jaune" (little yellow train) in the Pyrenees. The original French scheme was that every sous-prefecture should be rail connected. Extensive 600 mm (1 ft 11 5/8 in) gauge lines were also built for the sugar-beet industry in the north often using ex-military equipment after the First World War. Decauville was a famous French manufacturer of industrial narrow-gauge railway equipment and equipped one of the most extensive regional 600 mm (1 ft 11 5/8 in) narrow-gauge railway, the Chemins de fer du Calvados. Corsica has a narrow-gauge network of two lines following the coast line, that are connected by one line crossing the island through highly mountainous terrain. The petit train d'Artouste, a tourist line in the Pyrenees, uses 500 mm (19 3/4 in) gauge.

== Narrow-gauge funiculars ==
1,300 mm (4 ft 3 3/16 in)

- Funiculars of Lyon

1,200 mm (3 ft 11 1/4 in)

- Funiculaire du Perce-Neige
- Funival

1,100 mm (3 ft 7 5/16 in)

- Funiculaire de Thonon-les-Bains

600 mm (1 ft 11 5/8 in)

- Grand-Hôtel du Cap-Ferrat funicular; operating

== 1,000 mm (3 ft 3 3/8 in) ==
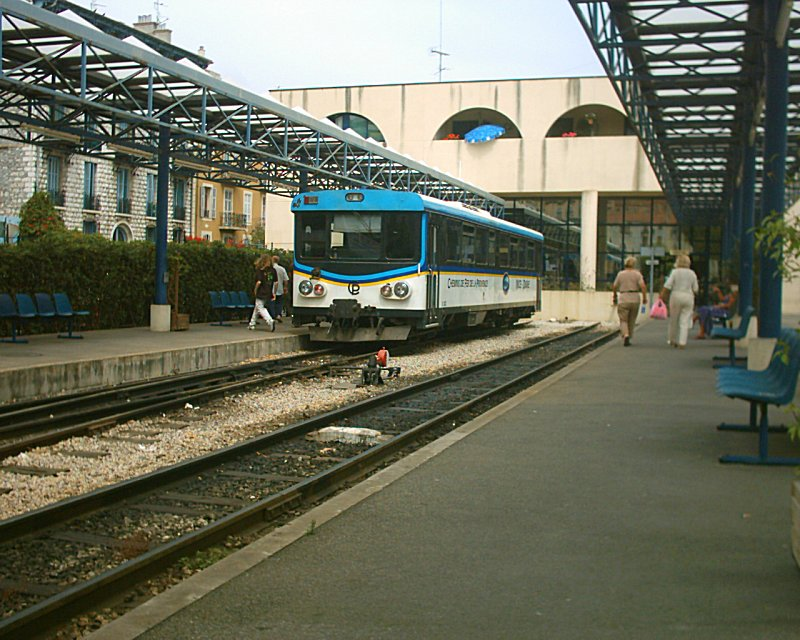
A Chemins de Fer de Provence train at Gare de Nice CP.

- Belleville funicular tramway (1891-1924)
- Chemin de fer d'Anvin à Calais (1881-1955)
- Chemin de fer de Boulogne à Bonningues (1900-48)
- Chemin de fer des Côtes-du-Nord (1905-56)
- Chemin de fer du Blanc-Argent
- Chemin de fer du Cambrésis (1881-1960)
- Chemin de fer du Finistère (1893-1946)
- Chemin de fer de La Mure
- Chemin de fer du Montenvers
- Chemin de fer du Vivarais
- Chemins de Fer d'Aire à Fruges et de Rimeux-Gournay à Berck (1891-1955)
- Chemins de fer de la Corse
- Train des pignes
  - Chemins de fer de Provence
- Chemins de fer du Morbihan (1902-48)
- Funiculaire de Pau
- Funiculaire de Saint-Hilaire du Touvet
- Funiculaire du Pic du Jer
- Funiculars of Lyon
- Ligne de Cerdagne
- Petit train de la Rhune
- PO Corrèze (1904-70)
- Réseau Albert (1889-1955)
- Réseau Breton (all closed or regauged)
- Réseau des Bains de Mer (1887-1951)
  - Chemin de fer de la Baie de Somme
- Saint-Étienne tramway
- Saint-Gervais–Vallorcine railway
- Tramway d'Avranches (1907-14)
- Tramway à vapeur d'Ardres à Pont d'Ardres (1902-55)
- Tramway du Mont-Blanc
- Tramways Électrique du Finistère (1903-32)

== 750 mm (2 ft 5 1/2 in) ==
- CF Economiques Forestiers des Landes (1907-34)

== 700 mm (2 ft 3 9/16 in) ==
- Chemin de fer d'Abreschviller; 6.1 km, operating

== 600 mm (1 ft 11 5/8 in) ==
- Chemin de Fer de la Vallée de l'Ouche;
- Chemin de Fer de Saint-Eutrope; 2.5 km, defunct
- Chemin de fer des Chanteraines; 5.5 km, operating
- Chemin de Fer des Combes; operating
- Chemin de fer du Haut-Rhône; 4 km, operating
- Chemin de fer touristique du fort de Villey-le-Sec; 1.3 km, operating
- Chemin de fer du Val de Passey at Choloy-Ménillot
- Chemins de fer du Calvados; (1891-1944)
- Compagnie du chemin de fer de Semur en Vallon
- Conservatoire provençal de patrimoine de véhicules anciens
- Froissy Dompierre Light Railway; operating
- Le petit train de Bligny sur Ouche
- Le petit train de l'Yonne; 2.5 km, operating
- Le p'tit train de Saint-Trojan; 6 km, operating
- Petit train du Port-aux-Cerises; 3 km, operating
- Rail Rebecq Rognon
- Tacot des Lacs; 2.5 km, operating
- Train de Rillé; 3 km, operating
- Train touristique du Musée de la Mine de Noyant-d'Allier; 1.8 km, operating
- Tramway de Deauville; (1876-1905)
- Tramway de Pithiviers à Toury; 80 km, part (30 km) operating as a heritage railway
- Tramway de Rothéneuf
- Tramway de la Trinité à Étel
- Tramway de Royan
- Tramway du Cap-Ferret; operating
- Tramway du Touquet-Paris-Plage
- Trianon tramway; (1906-11)
- Towing tramway along the Marne-Rhine Canal between Arzviller and Niderviller.

== 500 mm (19 3/4 in) ==
- Chemin de Fer Touristique du Tarn; original gauge 600 mm (1 ft 11 5/8 in)
- Jardin d'Acclimatation railway
- Petit train d'Artouste

== 400 mm (15 3/4 in) ==
- Train de l'Andorge en Cevennes

== See also ==
- Decauville
- Trench railways
- Voie ferrée d'intérêt local
- Voie Sacrée, see Le Chemin de Fer Meusien
