= List of World War II aces from Australia =

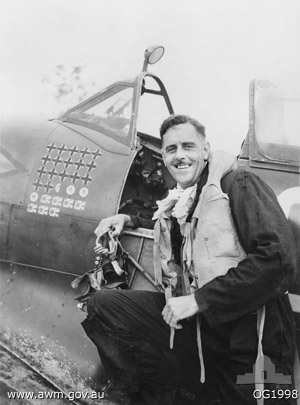
Clive Caldwell, the top-scoring Australian ace of World War II, with his Supermarine Spitfire on Morotai, Dutch East Indies, 1944

This is a list of fighter aces in World War II from Australia.

== Methodology ==
An "ace" is generally considered to be any pilot who has downed five or more enemy aircraft, though the term has never been officially adopted by the Royal Australian Air Force (RAAF). Accordingly, the numbers of victories attained by its fighter pilots were not routinely publicised by the RAAF during the war.

Historians have gleaned figures from combat reports, unit histories, personnel records, and award citations, which sometimes recorded the pilot's tally of victories at the time the decoration was recommended. The top-scoring Australian ace of World War II, Clive Caldwell, is generally credited with 28½ victories, that is, 27 solo "kills" and three shared, or a total of 30 if shared victories are counted as one each. His total was almost twice that of the second-highest scoring Australian ace, Adrian Goldsmith, with 17.

For aces of other countries, see List of World War II aces by country.

== Aces ==
Name	Victories	Unit(s)	Awards	Notes
Clive Caldwell	28½ or 30, i.e. 27 + 3 shared.	250, 112 Sqdns RAF; 1 Wing RAAF (CO)	DSO, DFC & Bar	In North Africa, Caldwell is credited with 21–23 victories; and in the South West Pacific, with 6½–7 victories.
Adrian Goldsmith	16¼ or 17	234, 242, 126 RAF 452 RAAF	DFC, DFM	
Paterson Hughes	15 or 17 (14 + 3 shared)	64, 234, 247 RAF	DFC	KIA 7 September 1940
Keith Truscott	15 or 16	452, 76 RAAF	DFC & Bar	Killed in flying accident on 28 March 1943
John Waddy	15 15½	250, 260, 92 RAF 4 SAAF 80 RAAF	DFC	
Les Clisby	14 or 16	1 RAF	DFC	KIA 15 May 1940
Charles Scherf	14 or 14½	418 RCAF	DSO, DFC & Bar	
Nigel Cullen	13 or 16	267, 80 RAF	DFC	KIA 4 March 1941
Mervyn Shipard	13 or 14	68, 89 RAF	DFC & Bar	
Tony Gaze	12 or 14 (11 + 3 shared) or 14.5	610, 616, 64, 129, 66, 41, RAF	DFC & Two Bars	Score includes one V-1 flying bomb.
Nicky Barr	12	3 RAAF	MC, DFC & Bar	
Bruce Bretherton	12	73 255 267 RAF	DFC	
Peter Turnbull	12	3, 75, 76 RAAF	DFC	KIA 27 August 1942
John Yarra	12	232, 64, 233, 185 RAF 453 RAAF	DFM	KIA 10 December 1942
Hugo Armstrong	11	126, 611, 72 RAF, 452 RAAF	DFC & Bar	KIA 5 February 1943
Charles Crombie	11 or 12	25, 89, 176, 89 RAF	DSO, DFC	KIFA 26 August 1945
Howard Mayers	11 or 12 (11 + 1 shared)	94, 601 RAF	DSO, DFC & Bar	
William Millington	11	79, 249 RAF	DFC	KIA 30 October 1940
Robert Whittle	11 or 13 (10 + 3 shared)	250 RAF 86 RAAF	DFM	
Bobby Gibbes	10¼ or 12 (10 + 2 shared)	450, 3 RAAF	DSO, DFC & Bar	
Virgil Brennan	10	64, 249 RAF 452, 79 RAAF	DFC, DFM	KIFA 13 June 1943
Edward Coate	10	252, 227, 272 RAF	DFC & Bar	
John Cock	10 or 11 (10 + 1 shared)	87, 72 RAF 3, 453 RAAF	DFC	
John Curchin	9 or 12 (8 + 4 shared)	600, 609 RAF	DFC	
James Kearney	9	31 RAAF	DFC	
Colin Parkinson	9 or 10	19, 56, 603, 229 RAF	DFC	
Norman Williams	9	10, 35 RAF, 23 RAAF	CGM, DFM & Bar	Bomber Command
Wilfred Arthur	8 or 10	3, 75, 76 RAAF	DSO, DFC	
John Jackson	8	23, 3, 75 RAAF	DFC	KIA 28 April 1942
Kenneth McDonald	8	31 RAAF	DFC	
John Pain	8	32, 261, 73 RAF		
John Perrin	8 or 10	87, 54 RAF 3, 5, 24, 76 RAAF	DFC	
Alan Rawlinson	8 or 10	3, 79 RAAF	DFC & Bar	
Ian Russell	8 or 10	245, 607, 609 RAF	DFC	KIA 1 June 1940
Gordon Steege	8	11, 260 RAF, 3, 450 RAAF	DSO, DFC	
William Storey	8	135 RAF	DFC	
Rex Wilson	8	3 RAAF	DFM	KIA 9 December 1941
John Bartle	7	112 RAF, 450 RAAF		
John Bisley	7		DFC	
Alan Boyd	7	3, 75, 76, 84, 67 RAAF		
John Boyd	7	135, 242, 126 RAF	DFM	KIA 14 May 1942
Gregory Graham	7	80 RAF		
Keith Hampshire	7 or 10	12, 6, 22, 456 RAAF	DSO & Bar, DFC	
Rudolf Leu	7	112 RAF	DFM	
Gordon Tweedale	7	43, 126, 155 RAF	DFM	KIA 9 May 1942
Russell Foskett	6½	80, 94 RAF	OBE, DFC	KIA 31 October 1944
Roderick Bowes	6	79 RAF	DFC	KIA 21 May 1943
Keith Chisholm	6 or 7 (5 + 2 shared)	452 RAAF	MC, DFM	
Alexander Constantine	6	141, 273, 136 RAF		
Robert Cowper	6	153, 89, 108 RAF 456 RAAF	DFC & Bar	Score includes one V-1 flying bomb
Walter Mailey	6	3 RAAF	DFM	
Gordon Olive	6 or 8	65 RAF, 456 RAAF	DFC	
Thomas Paxton	6	250, 30 RAF		
Stewart Rees	6	600 RAF	DFC	
John Saunders	6			KIA 22 November 1941
Desmond Sheen	6	212, 72 RAF	DFC & Bar	
Ronald Simes	6	3 RAAF	DFM	KIA 9 January 1942
Donald Smith	5 or 6 (5 + 1 shared)	126, 41 RAF 452, 453 RAAF	DFC	
Raymond Thorold-Smith	6 or 7 (6 + 1 shared)	452 RAAF	DFC	KIA 15 March 1943
Geoffrey Atherton	5	24, 25, 75, 82 RAAF	DFC & Bar	
Maxwell Bell	5	19 RAF	DFC	KIA 9 September 1944
Robert Bungey	5	226, 145 RAF 452 RAAF	DFC	Died 10 June 1943
Bobby Bunting	5	93 RAF	DFC	
Henry Burney	5	112 RAF		
Alan Cameron	5 or 7	3 RAAF	DFM	
Alfred Clare	5	453, 24, 5 RAAF		
Laurance Cronin	5	453 RAAF, 81 RAF	DFC	
William Cundy	5 or 7 (5 + 2 shared)	135, 260 RAF 452 RAAF	DFC, DFM	
Victor Curtis	5	3 RAAF		KIA 6 January 1943
Charles Fry	5 or 6	112 RAF	DFC & Bar	
Peter Giddy	5	3 RAAF		
Richard Glyde	5 or 6 (3 + 3 shared)	87 RAF	DFC	KIA 14 August 1940
Wilfred Goold	5	607 RAF	DFC	
Reginald Gordon	5 or 6	24, 31 RAF	DFC & Bar	
Ronald Hammond	5	248 RAF	DFM	
Richard Hillary	5	603 RAF		KIA 8 January 1943
Leslie Jackson	5	21, 23, 75 RAAF	DFC & Bar	
Peter Jeffrey	5 or 6 (5 + 1 shared)	3, 75, 76 RAAF	DSO, DFC	
Donald McBurnie	5 or 6 (5 + 1 shared)	238 RAF, 450, 451 RAAF	DFC, DFM	
Lawrence McIntosh	5	112, 111 RAF		
Richard Nitschke	5	250 RAF		KIA 20 December 1941
Ronald Rankin	5 or 8 (4 + 4 shared)	272, 236, 227 RAF 30 RAAF	DFC	
John Ratten	5	72 RAF 453 RAAF	DFC	KIA 27 February 1945
Leonard Reid	5 or 7	504, 185, 130 RAF 79, 452 RAAF	DFC	
Arthur Spurgin	5	68, 87, 89 RAF 86 RAAF	DFC	
