= Hugo Armstrong =

Australian flying ace (1916–1943)

Hugo Throssell Armstrong
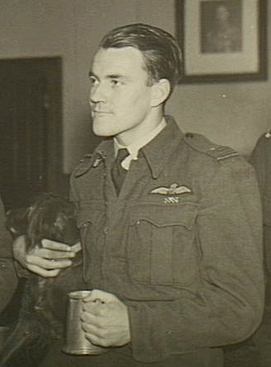
- Born: 9 June 1916; Perth, Australia
- Died: 5 February 1943 (aged 26); English Channel
- Military career
- Allegiance: Australia
- Branch: Royal Australian Air Force
- Rank: Squadron Leader
- Nickname: Sinker
- Units: No. 257 Squadron; No. 129 Squadron; No. 72 Squadron
- Commands: No. 611 Squadron
- Conflicts: Second World War; Circus offensive
- Awards: Distinguished Flying Cross and bar

Hugo Throssell Armstrong, DFC & Bar (9 June 1916 – 5 February 1943) was an Australian flying ace of the Royal Australian Air Force (RAAF) during the Second World War. He was credited with at least ten aerial victories.

From Perth, Armstrong joined the RAAF in May 1940. After completing his flight training he was sent to the United Kingdom where he was posted to No. 257 Squadron and then No. 129 Squadron. During his service with the latter, he destroyed a number of German aircraft while flying sorties to the Low Countries and France.

He was later transferred to No. 72 Squadron where he continued to be successful. Awarded the Distinguished Flying Cross (DFC) in May 1942, he was given command of No. 611 Squadron in September. In January 1943, he received a bar to his DFC. He was killed the following month when he was shot down over the English Channel.

== Early life ==
Born in Perth, Western Australia, on 9 June 1916, Hugo Throssell Armstrong was the son of Percival Armstrong and his wife Grace. He was the nephew of Captain Hugo Throssell, a Victoria Cross recipient of the First World War and also the grandson of George Throssell, a former premier of Western Australia. He was educated at Hale School and worked as a car salesman prior to his enlistment in the Royal Australian Air Force (RAAF) in May 1940.

== Second World War ==
Armstrong, who was nicknamed Sinker, underwent flight training at the RAAF station at Wagga before proceeding on to No. 4 Elementary Flying Training School. He was posted to the United Kingdom in February 1941 and was assigned to No. 257 Squadron. Operating from Coltishall using Hawker Hurricane fighters, the squadron was operating both at day and night, carrying out fighter sweeps to the Low Countries and also doing night patrols.

=== Circus offensive ===
Later in the year, Armstrong, at the time holding the rank of pilot officer, transferred to No. 129 Squadron, newly reformed in June and operating the Supermarine Spitfire fighter. As part of the Tangmere Wing, it was engaged in the RAF's Circus offensive, escorting bombers to targets in France. On one such mission, on 21 September, Armstrong destroyed a Messerschmitt Bf 109 fighter. The squadron continued in its escort role until November, at which time it switched to convoy patrols along the east coast.

No. 129 Squadron returned to offensive operations in early 1942, operating from Westhampnett. On 14 March, the Tangmere Wing were escorting Lockheed Hudson light bombers attacking a 6,000-ton vessel and accompanying escort ships that were making their way to Le Havre. Armstrong's squadron provided top cover and when several Bf 109s attempted to engage the bombers, he destroyed one 5 miles (8.0 km) from Étretat. Ten days later he shot down a Focke-Wulf Fw 190 fighter near Abbeville. Another Fw 190 was damaged over the English Channel on 4 April.

Promoted to flight lieutenant and posted to No. 72 Squadron later in April as one of its flight commanders, Armstrong damaged a Fw 190 at the end of the month. He destroyed a Bf 109 on 4 May, and also shared in the destruction of another the same day. On 27 May he shot down a Bf 109. He was duly awarded the Distinguished Flying Cross (DFC) at the end of the month; the citation, published in The London Gazette, read:

This officer has participated in 29 operational sorties over enemy territory. He has destroyed at least 5 enemy aircraft and damaged a further 2. Flight Lieutenant Armstrong has displayed courage and initiative and his judgment and skill as a leader have contributed largely to the successes achieved by his flight.

— London Gazette, No. 35577, 29 May 1942

On 5 June Armstrong destroyed yet another Bf 109, over Abbeville airfield, and on 27 July shot down a Fw 190 off Calais. In August, he was reported to have been offered the command of one of the RAF's American fighter squadrons but was struck down with appendicitis and hospitalised before he could take up the role. On recovering his health, he was given command of No. 611 Squadron, a Royal Auxiliary Air Force fighter squadron. He was the first Australian graduate from the Empire Air Training Scheme to lead a RAF squadron in the United Kingdom.

=== Squadron command ===
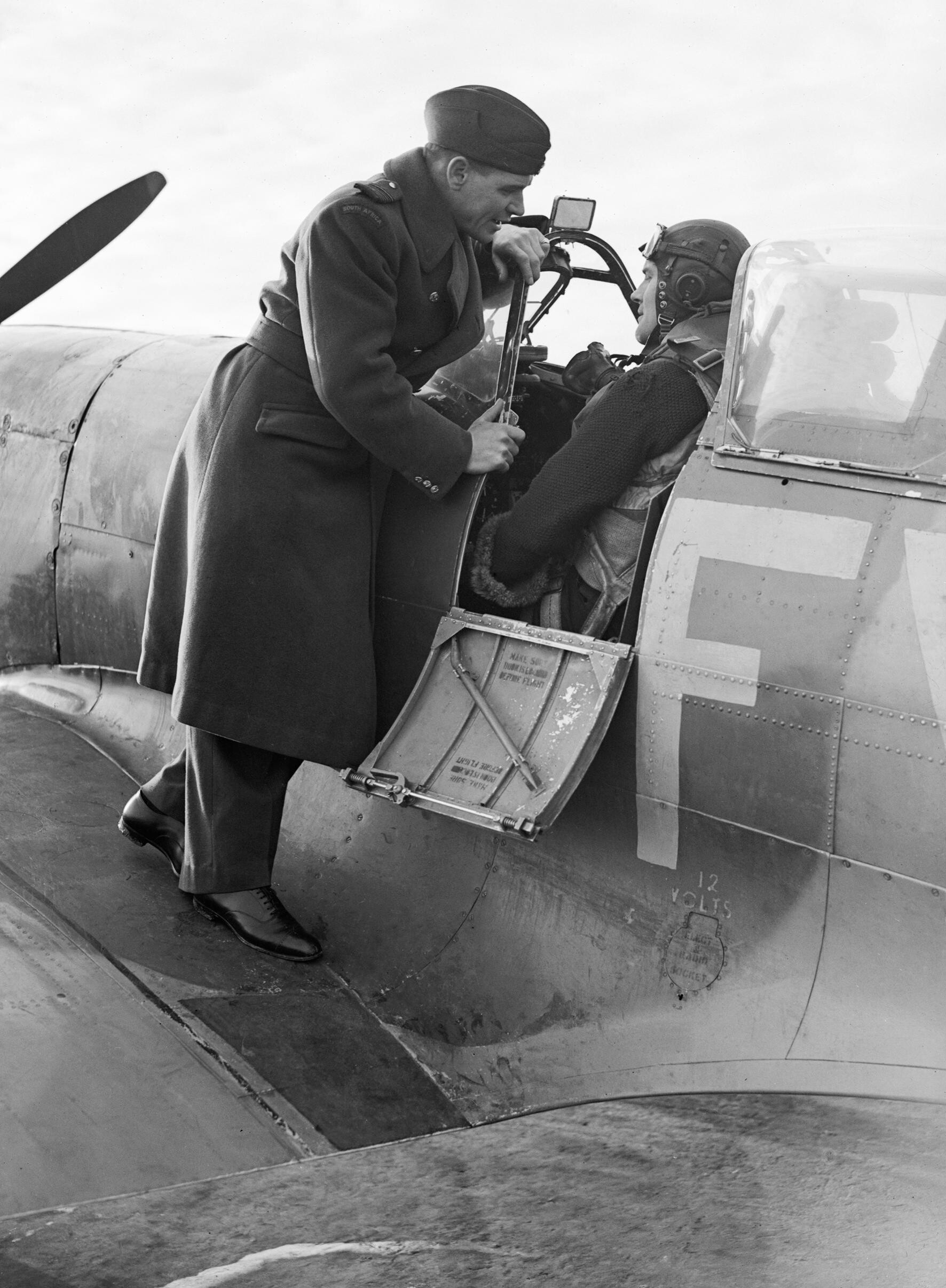
Group Captain Adolph Malan, the station commander at Biggin Hill, on the wing of Armstrong's Spitfire, 2 January 1943

At the time Armstrong took command of No. 611 Squadron as acting squadron leader, it operated the Spitfire Mk IX, which was competitive with the Luftwaffe's Fw 190, from Biggin Hill. The squadron was tasked with high-cover patrols and bomber escort duties. On 2 October 1942, Armstrong claimed a Bf 109 as probably destroyed off the French coast. Exactly a month later, he shot down a Fw 190 over the Somme estuary and was also credited with a Bf 109 as a probable. A Fw 190 was claimed as a probable on 9 November. In early January 1943, Armstrong was awarded a bar to his DFC.

The published citation read:

Since being awarded the Distinguished Flying Cross Squadron Leader Armstrong has participated in many sorties over enemy occupied territory during which he has destroyed a further 4 enemy fighters and probably destroyed 2 others. His great powers of leadership have contributed largely to the successes achieved by his squadron. This officer's keenness to engage the enemy at all times and his excellent escort work have set an inspiring example to all.

— London Gazette, No. 35855, 8 January 1943

At this stage of the war, the Luftwaffe was mounting sneak attacks on targets in the United Kingdom using fighter-bombers and on 20 January, Armstrong intercepted one of these and shot down two Bf 109s 1 mile (1.6 km) south of Pensevey Bay, near Eastbourne. On 5 February, while attempting another interception of a sneak attack by German fighter-bombers, Armstrong and two wingmen were themselves attacked by several Fw 190s over the English Channel. He was shot down and killed by the Luftwaffe flying ace Heinz Gomann.

Armstrong was described in Australia's official history of the Second World War as having the qualities "which marks the truly-great fighter pilot". He has no known grave and is commemorated on the Runneymeade Memorial at Englefield Green. He is credited with ten aircraft destroyed, shared in the destruction of another aircraft, three probably destroyed, and two damaged. The bar to his DFC was presented by Western Australia's Lieutenant Governor, Sir James Mitchell, to his mother in a ceremony at Government House in Perth on 4 August 1944.

== See also ==
- List of World War II aces from Australia
