= Ron Rankin =

RAAF officer & Australia international rugby union player (1914–1991)

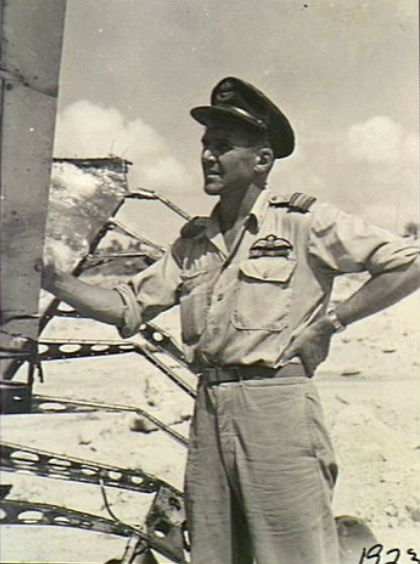
- Rankin in 1944
- Born: 3 November 1914; Majors Creek, New South Wales, Australia
- Died: 7 August 1991 (aged 76); Canberra, Australian Capital Territory, Australia
- Military career
- Allegiance: Australia
- Branch: Royal Australian Air Force
- Service years: 1940–1945
- Rank: Squadron Leader
- Service number: 402394
- Conflicts: Second World War; North African campaign; Tunisian campaign; Italian campaign; Allied invasion of Sicily; New Guinea campaign
- Awards: Distinguished Flying Cross & Bar; Croix de Guerre (Belgium)
- Height: 175 cm (5 ft 9 in)
- Weight: 73.5 kg (162 lb)
- School: Hurlstone Agricultural High School
- Occupation(s): Farmer, teacher

Rugby union career
- Position: Fullback
International career
Years	Team	Apps	(Points)
1936–38	Australia	7	(27)

Ronald Rankin, DFC & Bar (3 November 1914 – 7 August 1991) was an Australian fighter ace in the Second World War and a rugby union international of the 1930s.

== Biography ==
Born in Majors Creek, a Southern Tablelands village outside Braidwood, Rankin was the second of four children and received his education in Sydney at Hurlstone Agricultural High School.

Rankin, a strong tackling fullback, was appointed Drummoyne captain in his second season of first-grade in 1935. He gained seven Test caps for the Wallabies, first selected as 21-year old for the 1936 tour of New Zealand, where he debuted against the All Blacks at Athletic Park, Wellington. Capped for the final time in 1938, he was later part of the 1939–40 tour of Britain and Ireland, which was abandoned two days after the team arrived due to the war.

During the war, Rankin was attached to the No. 236 Squadron RAF in England, flying Blenheims on missions and reconnaissance. He later flew Beaufighters over north Africa while stationed in Egypt with the No. 227 Squadron. By the time he completed his tour in January 1943, Rankin had shot down at least five enemy aircraft and was awarded the Distinguished Flying Cross. After returning home, he was honoured by Belgium with the Croix de guerre, then joined the No. 30 Squadron RAAF for bombing and strafing missions over the Netherlands East Indies and New Guinea.

Rankin was a farmer in Braidwood and a Canberra teacher in his post war life.

== See also ==
- List of Australia national rugby union players
