= Keith Chisholm =

Keith Bruce Chisholm
- Born: 22 December 1918; Petersham, New South Wales
- Died: 23 August 1991 (aged 72); New York City, United States
- Military career
- Allegiance: Australia
- Branch: Royal Australian Air Force
- Service years: 1940–1946
- Rank: Flight Lieutenant
- Service number: 402150
- Unit: No. 452 Squadron RAAF
- Conflicts: Second World War; Channel Front
- Awards: Military Cross; Distinguished Flying Medal
- Other work: Woolbuyer

Keith Bruce Chisholm, MC, DFM (22 December 1918 – 23 August 1991) was an Australian pilot who served in No. 452 Squadron RAAF during the Second World War. He was recognised for his exploits with the Polish and French resistance after being shot down over France in October 1941.

== Early career ==
Chisholm was born in Petersham, New South Wales, and educated at Newington College (1930–1936). While training as a dentist, war broke out, and he joined the Royal Australian Air Force, in 1940 and trained with the Empire Air Training Scheme in Canada, being one of the first Australian graduates.

== With No. 452 Squadron and capture ==
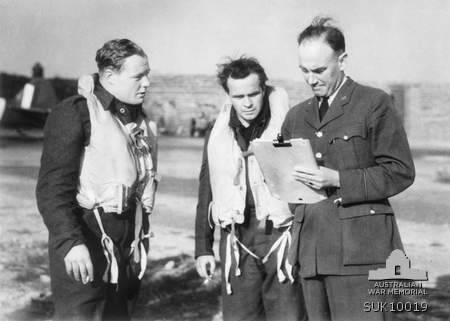
Squadron Leader Keith Truscott (left) and Sergeant Chisholm (centre) of No. 452 (Spitfire) Squadron RAAF at an RAF station, with the Squadron Intelligence Officer, 20 September 1941

In May 1941 he was assigned to 452 squadron, a Royal Australian Air Force squadron which belonged to the RAF Kenley Wing. In August and September 1941, he was responsible for 7 "kills," while flying Spitfire Mark Vs. On 1 October 1941, he was shot down near Berck-sur-Mer, and parachuted into the sea. The official Australian War History notes:

In Chisholm the squadron lost a pilot of outstanding ability who had contributed greatly to its record of achievements. His subsequent exploits... may serve to indicate the character of these early non-professional pilots.

He was captured by the Germans and sent to Lamsdorf Prisoner of War camp. In April 1942 he and another RAAF airman exchanged identities with two soldiers and were able to join a working party outside the camp. In June, Chisholm and several others escaped. They were recaptured near Brno, in Czechoslovakia, and returned to Lamsdorf Prisoner of War camp.

== Successful escape ==
In August 1942, having again swapped his identity, Chisholm and three others managed to escape from a work camp near Gliwice in occupied Poland. After a week they made contact with sympathetic Poles from Home Army and were taken to a resistance leader in Kraków. Chisholm lived with a Polish family in Warsaw for much of this time. Plans for escape back to England were developed and abandoned as the war progressed.

The official account of his escape notes a degree of audacity in his activities; on one occasion, when a fellow escapee's papers (Charles Douw van der Krap) were challenged in Poland, he pushed a German policeman into the Vistula river to effect their escape. The German subsequently drowned. According to Krap's diary, Chisholm overreacted to a routine document check, which endangered them and caused Krap's, whose document was recovered by the Germans, much trouble, forcing him into hiding. In March 1944, Chisholm and another Dutch escapee, Frederik Kruimink, left Poland by train for Berlin, using money and forged papers obtained from the Polish resistance.

After a day spent in Berlin; "Visiting cinemas, viewing bomb damage and dining in restaurants," Chisholm and his partner departed by train for Brussels. After many delays, Chisholm reached Paris on 10 May 1944. Here he lived with a policeman and joined the French Forces of the Interior, until, with liberation, he was able to return to England on 30 August 1944.

Official War historian John Hetherington commented:

For more than two years he had by tenacity, effrontery and resilience kept himself free in enemy territory and despite repeated failures as his successive plans neared fruition, had finally surmounted all difficulties and escaped completely.

Chisholm was the first Empire trainee to win the Distinguished Flying Medal.

== Later life ==
After the war, Chisholm sponsored a member of the family who had hidden him, Polish lawyer and former underground member Halina Kozubowska, to come to Australia. He met her on arrival in Sydney with other refugees in November 1946.

"I always fall on my feet" he told the Western Mail in 1952, following his engagement to 24-year-old Eliane Defferriere, in Paris in 1952. After the war he became a woolbuyer, moving to Andover, Massachusetts in 1957.

Chisholm died in 1991, survived by his second wife, Marie-France, and four children. A memorial service was held in the Newington College Chapel. In 1993, his ashes were returned to Australia by his widow and stepson and interred, with full military honours, at Rookwood Cemetery with a Newington College Guard of Honour.

== See also ==
- List of World War II aces from Australia
