= Trams in Avranches =

Railway line in France

Coordinates: 48.68511795501748°N 1.3561732073836121°W

Electric tram in Avranches
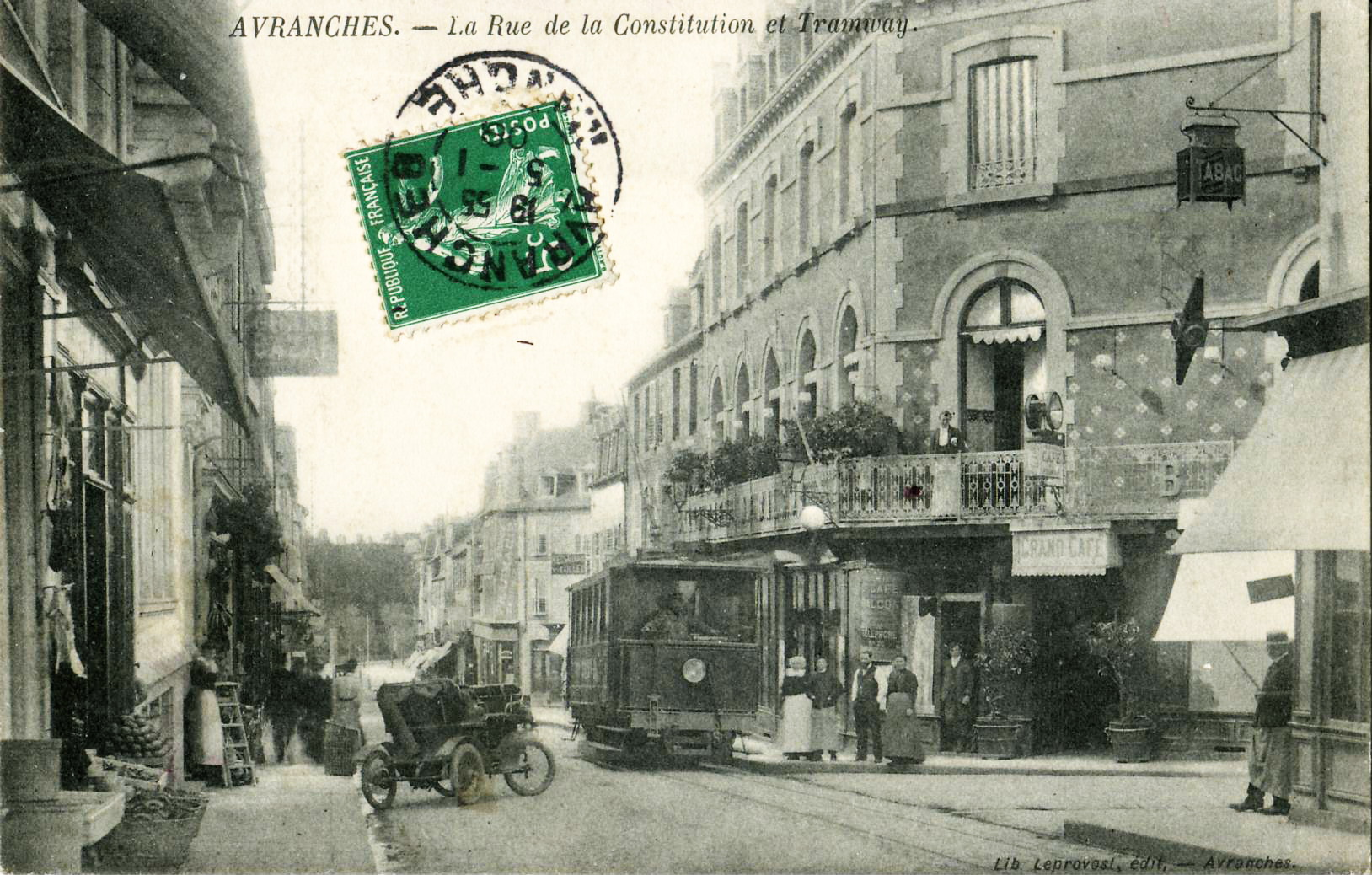
- Electric tram in Rue de la Constitution

Technical
- Line length: 2.7 km (1.7 mi)
- Track gauge: 1,000 mm (3 ft 3 3/8 in)
Route map
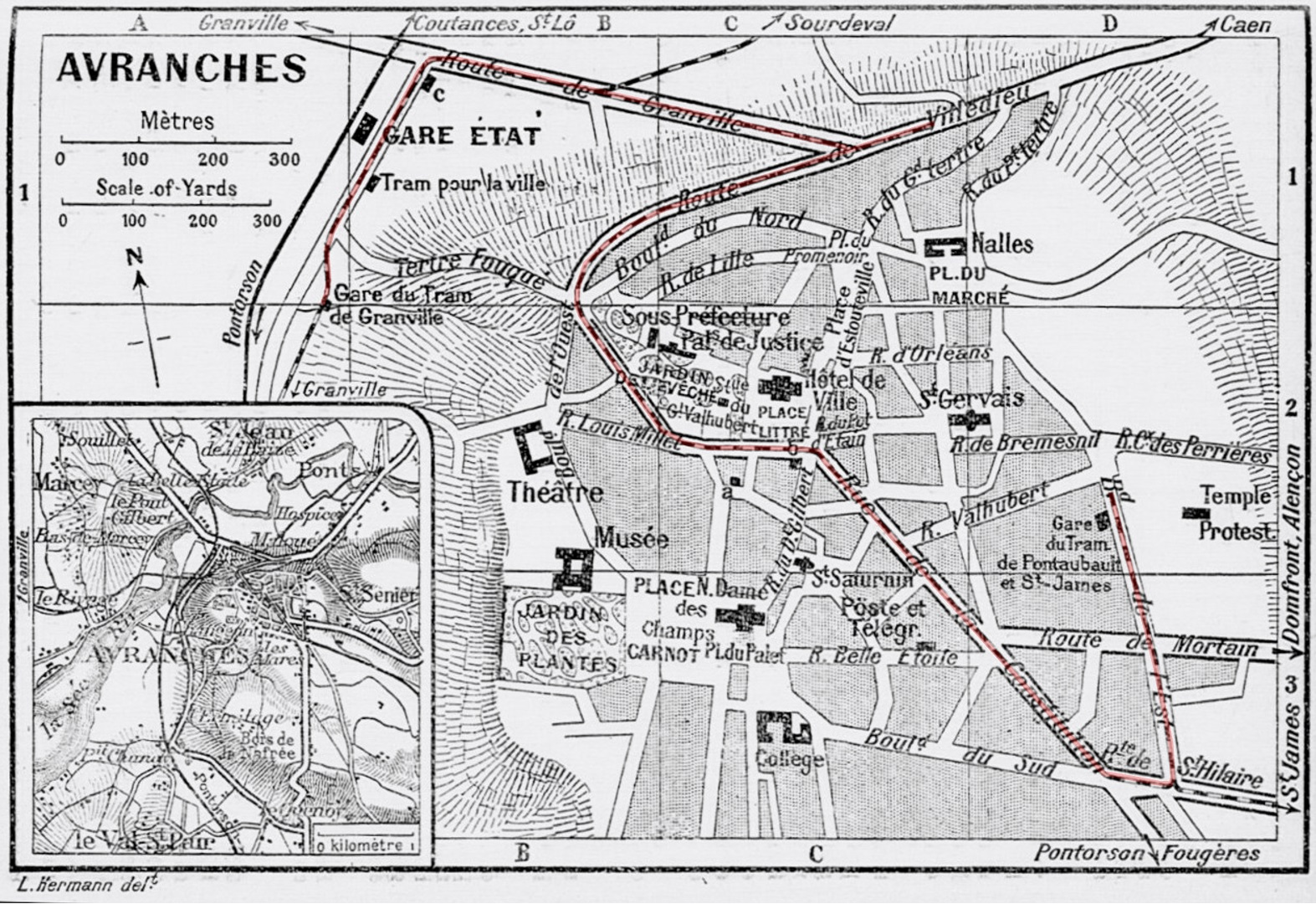

The Tramway d'Avranches was a 2.7 kilometres (1.7 miles) long tramway system serving the coastal town of Avranches, France.

Inaugurated in April 1907, the network consisted in a 1,000 mm (3 ft 3 3/8 in) line stretching across the town centre. Traction was electric. The tram closed on 2 August 1914.

== History ==
In December 1904, the Société française des tramways électriques, which had been awarded the concession for the steam operated Granville-Avranches-Sourdeval tramway, informed the municipality of Avranches of its intention to install an electric tramway between its railway station and town centre instead of the originally planned 1.7 kilometres (1.1 miles) long rack railway. The energy was supplied by a power plant built by Mr Ravous, a building contractor from Granville, and located near the Avranches station. It consisted of steam boilers, an engine room and an accumulator room.

The tramway was inaugurated by mayor Maurice Chevrel. Twelve departures per day were offered to passengers, from 6:30 to 20:45.

Operations were suspended during World War I and the electrical operation went unreinstated, but a horse-drawn carriage link then replaced it, until a bus link was introduced in September 1939.

Avranches-Est station, also known as the tramway station, was demolished around 1990. All that remains is the Place des Tramways.

== Stations ==
The tramway had initially seven and later nine stations, as follows:

- Gare du Tram de Granville, also known as Gare de Chemins de fer de la Manche
- Avranches-Etat, now Avranches railway station (connection to standard gauge Lison–Lamballe railway and metre gauge Granville-Avranches-Sourdeval tramway)
- Malhoué, also known as Rue de Malloué, now Rue de la Liberté
- Bourg-l’Evêque, now Rue du Général-de-Gaulle
- Hotel de Ville, previously Place Littré
- Rue Valhubert
- Place Angot
- Octroi du Centre, now Place Patton
- Avranches-Est (connection to metre gauge Avranches–Saint-James tramway

It had been originally planned that the terminus of the line in the town would be located at the terminal station of the Avranches–Saint-James tramway, using its track between the Octroi du Centre (now Place Patton) and the station. The track and the switch connecting the two lines had been laid, but a fault in the switch had caused an accident in March 1907, when the Avranches to Saint-James tramway ran onto the track of the electric tramway towards the station, causing the derailment of a car at the end of the train. As the Société des chemins de fer de la Manche operating the electric line and the Compagnie des tramways normands operating the tramway from Avranches to Saint-James were initially unable to agree on how to operate the section together, the electric line ran initially only to Octroi du Centre.

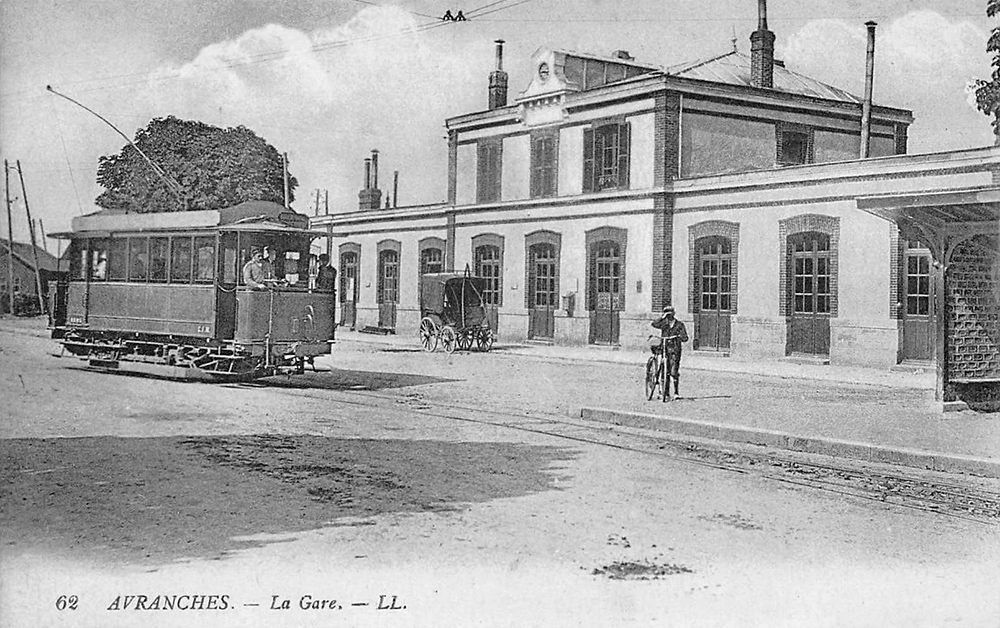
The tramway at the Avranches-État station

During 1909, part of the services were extended from Avranches-État station to the Gare du Tram de Granville (also known as Gare de Chemins de fer de la Manche). They just stopped at the Gare de l'Etat to pick-up passengers. By October 1909, the line was extended from Octroi du Centre to the Avranches–Saint-James tramway terminus.

== Connections ==
The electric tramway had the same gauge and was connected to the steam operated Granville-Avranches-Sourdeval tramway and Avranches–Saint-James tramway at either end of its line.
