= Condé-Granville tramway =

Railway in Normandy, France

Coordinates: 48.83653194917484°N 1.602469970145911°W

Condé–Granville tramway
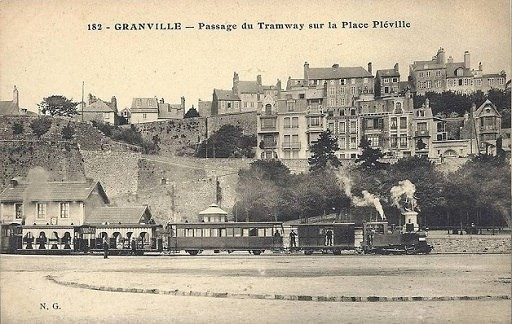
- Passage of the Tramway over the Pléville Square in Granville

Technical
- Line length: 68 km (42.25 mi)
- Track gauge: 1,000 mm (3 ft 3 3/8 in)

The Condé-Granville tramway was a 68 (42¼) long metre gauge railway from Granville to Avranches in the Manche department of the Normandy region, which operated from 1908 to 1935.

== History ==
The line opened in 1908, at a similar time as the Granville-Avranches-Sourdeval tramway Coutances-Lessay metre gauge railway. Both lines were operated by the Société des Chemins de Fer de la Manche (CFM) until 1935.

The locomotives required an average of 400 litres of water every 20 kilometres (105 Gallons per 12½ miles), so many water towers were installed along the line where they could be refilled. They were so light and flimsy that it is said that some passengers would occasionally get off on the uphill gradient from the Bréhal station towards Donville to relieve the locomotive.

Members of the Association des Amis du Moulin du Hutrel et du Petit Patrimoine Bréhalai excavated a 10 m (32 ft) section of track around 2013 and laid it near the lagoons on the surviving stone bridge over the river La Vanlée and secured it with reconstructed railings.
