= Les Clisby =

Royal Air Force officer

Leslie Redford (Les) Clisby
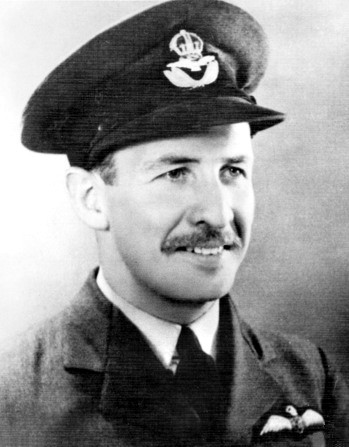
- Flying Officer Les Clisby
- Born: 29 June 1914; McLaren Vale, South Australia
- Died: 15 May 1940 (aged 25) near Rethel, France
- Military career
- Allegiance: Australia; United Kingdom
- Branch: Royal Australian Air Force; Royal Air Force
- Service years: 1935–40
- Rank: Flying Officer
- Unit: No. 1 Squadron RAF (1937–40)
- Conflicts: World War II; Battle of France †
- Awards: Distinguished Flying Cross

Leslie Redford (Les) Clisby, DFC (29 June 1914 – 15 May 1940) was an Australian fighter ace of World War II. Serving with the Royal Air Force (RAF), he was credited with sixteen aerial victories before being killed in action during the Battle of France. In a combat career lasting a matter of months, he was Australia's first ace of the war.

Born in South Australia, Clisby joined the Royal Australian Air Force as a mechanic in 1935, but was later accepted for flying training. He graduated as a pilot in 1937, and chose to take a commission with the RAF. After arriving in Britain, he was assigned to No. 1 Squadron, flying the recently introduced Hawker Hurricane. Posted to France following the outbreak of World War II, he achieved his first aerial victory on 1 April 1940.

Clisby became known as a highly aggressive fighter pilot, who threw himself into combat irrespective of the odds. In a five-day period, commencing on 10 May 1940, he was credited with destroying at least eight German aircraft. Awarded the Distinguished Flying Cross for these and earlier victories, he was himself shot down in flames on 15 May. He was buried in France.

== Early career ==
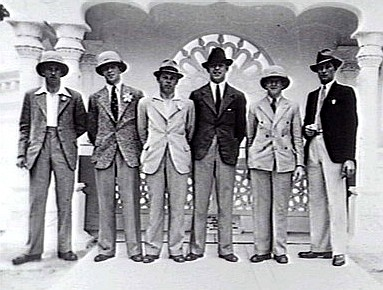
Clisby (far left) and fellow RAAF pilots in Ceylon en route to Britain, 4 August 1937

Born in McLaren Vale, South Australia, on 29 June 1914, Clisby was the second of four children of carpenter Albert Clisby and his wife Mabel, née Chapman. While attending Nailsworth Junior Technical School, Les studied engineering in evening classes at the South Australian School of Mines and Industries in Adelaide. He joined the Royal Australian Air Force (RAAF) as a mechanic in 1935, and was later accepted into the flying training course at Point Cook, Victoria.

On 24 April 1936, Clisby was flying in formation when he encountered problems and bailed out. An inquiry found that the plane's loss was due to his lack of experience. He graduated in 1937 and, under a pre-war arrangement between the British and Australian governments, volunteered for transfer to the Royal Air Force (RAF), sailing for Europe that July. On 26 August, he was granted a five-year short-service commission as a pilot officer, and assigned to No. 1 Squadron at RAF Tangmere in Sussex. The unit operated the new Hawker Hurricane, a monoplane with a top speed of over 300 miles per hour (480 km/h) and four machine guns in each wing. In among training and an active social life, Clisby wrote to his family of a young lady back home in Adelaide becoming his fiancée.

== World War II ==
By the outbreak of war on 1 September 1939, Clisby was a flying officer. Five days later, No. 1 Squadron deployed to Le Havre in northern France with the RAF Advanced Air Striking Force that accompanied the British Expeditionary Force. Through the autumn and winter of 1939–40, amid the so-called Phoney War, a succession of small and indecisive clashes took place between the Allied air forces and the Luftwaffe. Clisby achieved his first aerial victory on 1 April 1940, a Messerschmitt Bf 110 twin-engined fighter over Moselle. The following day in the same vicinity, he claimed a Messerschmitt Bf 109. As the Battle of France opened on 10 May, Clisby began to score heavily, estimates for his run of "kills" in the next five days ranging from eight to thirteen or more.

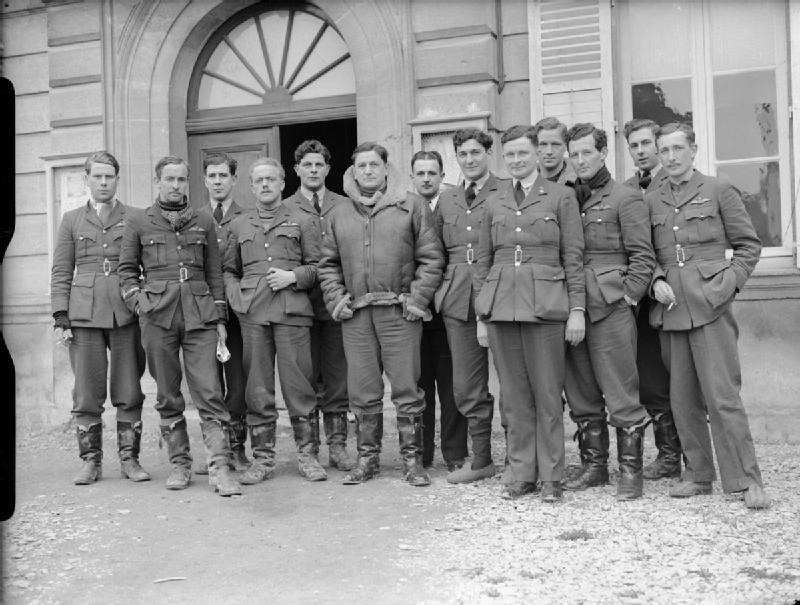
Flying Officer Clisby (second from left) and fellow officers of No. 1 Squadron RAF in France, April 1940. Pilot Officer Robert Lawrie Lorimer (third from left) would die in the same action as Clisby the following month.

Clisby destroyed two Dornier Do 17 bombers on 10 May, after which his aircraft was struck by friendly fire from a French anti-aircraft battery. He became an ace the following day, when he shot down three German fighters, before the rudder of his Hurricane was damaged by enemy gunfire. Breaking off combat, he found a Heinkel He 111 bomber drifting in front of him and instinctively took a shot at it, forcing it to land in a paddock. Clisby himself landed nearby and, when they tried to escape, chased the German crewmen across the field, firing his revolver. Capturing one in a rugby tackle, he forced the others to surrender at gunpoint. He then proceeded to march them over to French authorities before rejoining his squadron, whose diarist recorded: "He wanted their autographs!" According to Time magazine, reporting on the exploit some weeks later, "Clisby's commanding officer remarked it was a bit uncommon for pilots to bring back prisoners".

By now Clisby had become known for his extreme aggression in the air, rushing headlong into combat irrespective of the odds and often alone. On 12 May, he was credited with the destruction of six aircraft, claiming three Bf 109s and three Henschel Hs 126 reconnaissance planes (also identified as Arados) during action in support of Fairey Battles in their historic raid on the Albert Canal bridges near Maastricht, on the Dutch-Belgian border. For his achievements that day, as well as his earlier successes, Clisby was awarded the Distinguished Flying Cross (DFC). The citation was promulgated in the London Gazette on 14 June:

Flying Officer Leslie Redford CLISBY (40043) (now reported missing). One day in April, 1940, this officer was the pilot of one of three Hurricanes which attacked nine Messerschmitt 109's, one of which he shot down. The following day he destroyed another Messerschmitt 109. In May, 1940, this officer was engaged in six combats against the enemy in which he shot down eight enemy aircraft. Flying Officer Clisby has displayed great courage on all occasions.

Described as being "extrovert, profane, perpetually cheerful and addicted to flying", Clisby also had "premature lines" on his face. At twenty-five, and with only a few months of air-to-air combat experience, he was considered a seasoned campaigner and had become No. 1 Squadron's top-scoring ace. He was also the first Australian-born ace of the war, and was well known for giving vent to patriotic feelings for his homeland in another way. All RAAF personnel who served with the RAF were permitted to continue wearing their original dark-blue Australian uniform until it wore out, after which they were to exchange it for the lighter-coloured British variety. Clisby flatly refused to give up his RAAF uniform, regardless of how shabby it became. When teased about its condition, he would simply respond, "It will see me through".

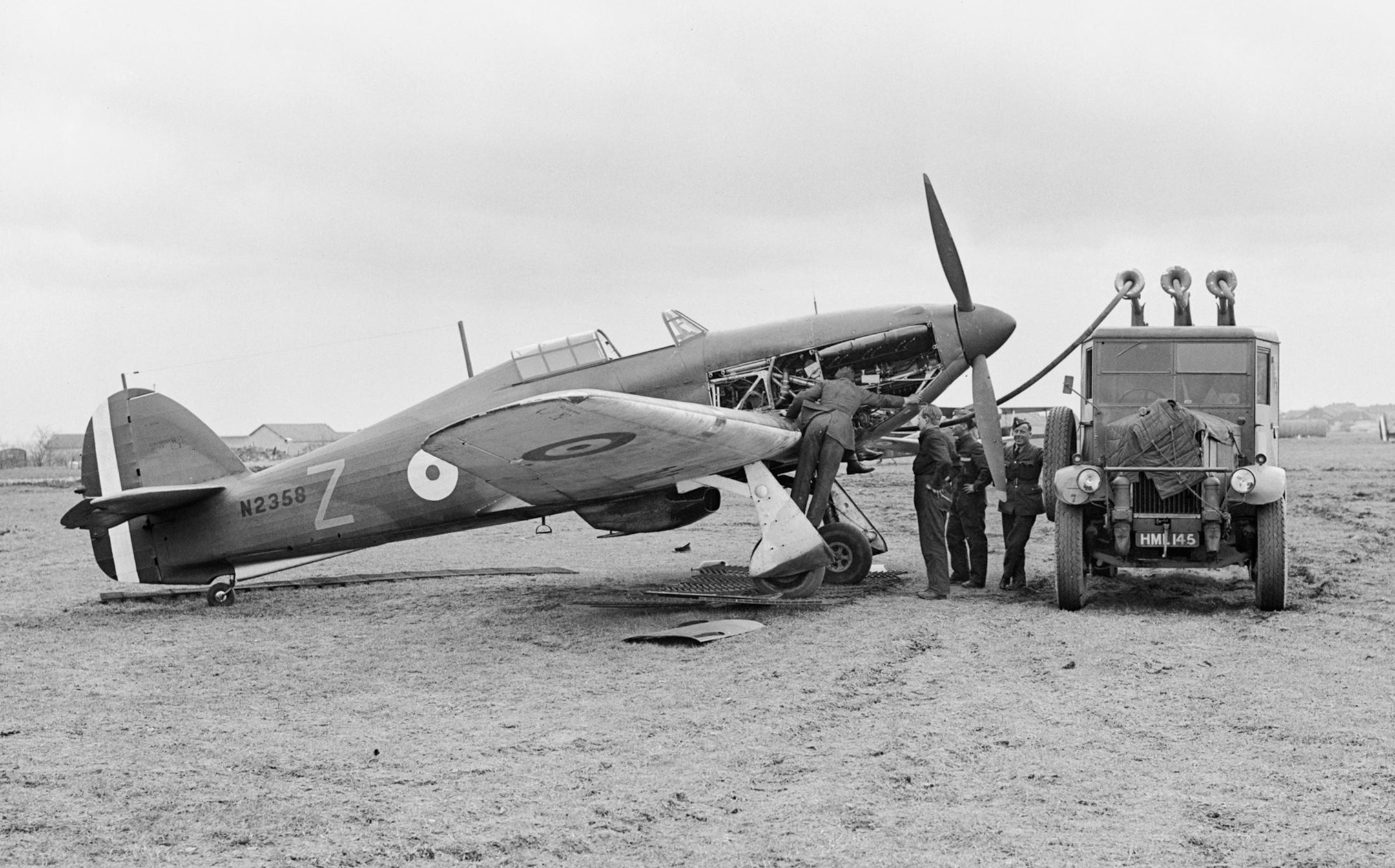
Hurricane of No. 1 Squadron refuelling at an airfield in France, April 1940

Clisby was still wearing his RAAF uniform on 15 May when he went into action with his flight against more than thirty Bf 110s over Reims. Having destroyed two of the German heavy fighters, Clisby's Hurricane was seen going down with its cockpit trailing smoke and flames, evidently hit by cannon fire. He was initially posted as "missing", along with one of his comrades, Flying Officer Lorimer, whose plane was also seen losing height in the same action. The French later found two burnt-out Hurricanes in the vicinity of Rethel, which were identified as Clisby's and Lorimer's. Clisby died without knowing that he had been awarded the DFC. A fellow pilot later said, "He was an Australian and had thrown himself into the fray with a reckless abandon that was magnificent in its way".

Estimates of Clisby's number of victories in his short career range from nine to twenty or more, but the most common—and official—score attributed to him is sixteen. The loss of much of the RAF's documentation in the chaotic retreat through France and across the English Channel in May 1940 meant that many squadron records and combat claims had to be reconstructed from the memory of surviving personnel. Even the date of Clisby's death is unclear, some sources—including the Commonwealth War Graves Commission—claiming 14 May rather than the following day. Regardless of the exact date, he was the first RAF ace of the war to be lost in action.

Clisby was buried in the military cemetery at Choloy in north-eastern France. His name appears on Supplementary Panel 12 of the Commemorative Area at the Australian War Memorial, Canberra.

== See also ==
- List of World War II aces from Australia
