= Paterson Clarence Hughes =

Australian fighter pilot (1917–1940)

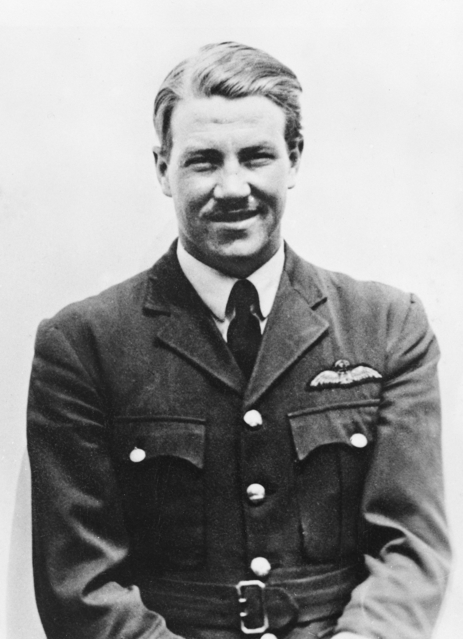
- Hughes in 1940
- Born: 19 September 1917; Cooma, New South Wales, Australia
- Died: 7 September 1940 (aged 22); Sundridge, Kent, England
- Military career
- Allegiance: Australia; United Kingdom
- Branch: Royal Australian Air Force (1936–1937); Royal Air Force (1937–1940)
- Service years: 1936–1940
- Rank: Flight lieutenant
- Service number: 39461 (RAF)
- Units: No. 64 Squadron RAF (1937–1939); No. 234 Squadron RAF (1939–1940)
- Conflicts: World War II; European air campaign; Battle of Britain †
- Awards: Distinguished Flying Cross

Paterson Clarence Hughes, DFC (19 September 1917 – 7 September 1940) was an Australian fighter ace of World War II. Serving with the Royal Air Force (RAF), he was credited with as many as seventeen aerial victories during the Battle of Britain, before being killed in action in September 1940. His tally made him the highest-scoring Australian of the battle, and among the three highest-scoring Australians of the war.

Born in Cooma, New South Wales, Hughes joined the Royal Australian Air Force as a cadet in 1936. After graduating as a pilot, he chose to take a commission with the RAF. In July 1937, he was assigned to No. 64 Squadron, which operated Hawker Demon and, later, Bristol Blenheim fighters. Posted to No. 234 Squadron following the outbreak of World War II, Hughes began flying Supermarine Spitfires as a flight commander. He shared in his unit's first aerial victory on 8 July 1940, and began scoring heavily against the Luftwaffe the following month. Known for his practice of attacking his targets at extremely close range, Hughes is generally thought to have died after his Spitfire was struck by flying debris from a German bomber that he had just shot down. He was posthumously awarded the Distinguished Flying Cross, and was buried in England.

== Early life ==
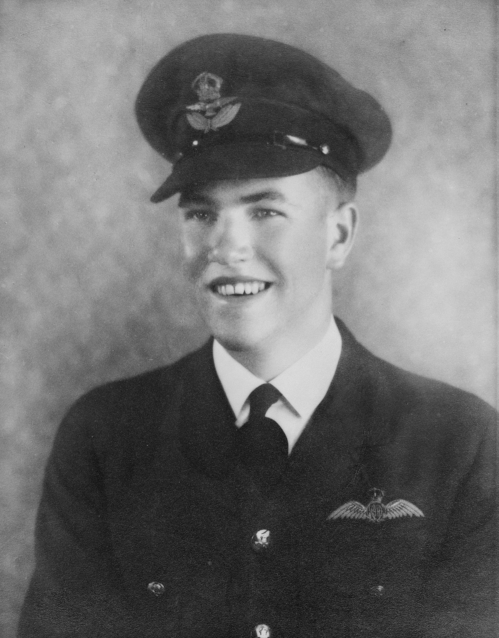
Hughes, c. December 1936

Paterson Clarence Hughes was born in Numeralla, near Cooma, New South Wales, on 19 September 1917. He was the second-youngest of twelve children, the last of four boys in his family. Hughes's father was a teacher by profession but at the time of Pat's birth was running the community post office; christened Percival Clarence Hughes, and known as Percy, he had apparently adopted the name Paterson by the time of his marriage to Catherine Vennell in 1895. Percy was also a writer, contributing to newspapers and magazines such as The Bulletin, and "Paterson" may have been homage to the poet Banjo Paterson. In any case, Pat shared his father's interest in literature. He also grew to love the landscape of the local Monaro district in the shadow of the Snowy Mountains, which he described as "unrivalled in the magnificence and grandeur of its beauty".

Hughes was educated at Cooma Public School until age twelve, when the family moved to Haberfield in Sydney; his father was by then working as a labourer. He attended Petersham Boys' School, becoming a prefect in 1932 and vice captain the following year. As well as playing sport, he was a keen aircraft modeller and built crystal radio sets. Having attained his intermediate certificate, Hughes entered Fort Street High School in February 1934. He left after eight months to take up employment at Saunders' Jewellers in George Street, Sydney, and enlisted in the Royal Australian Air Force (RAAF) on 20 January 1936. Hughes had also applied to, and been accepted by, the Royal Australian Navy, but chose the RAAF.

Training as an air cadet at RAAF Point Cook near Melbourne, Hughes learnt to fly in de Havilland Moths before progressing to Westland Wapitis in the middle of the year. A practical joker who bridled under RAAF discipline, his euphoria during his first solo on 11 March 1936 was such that he "went mad, whistled, sang and almost jumped for joy". A fellow cadet recalled that Hughes "loved life and lived it at high pressure". Upon graduation in December 1936, Hughes was assessed as having "no outstanding qualities" despite being "energetic and keen". Under a pre-war arrangement between the British and Australian governments, he volunteered for transfer to the Royal Air Force (RAF), and sailed for the United Kingdom in January 1937. His decision to transfer had not been quick or easy; though keen to "try and do something special" in England, and intrigued by "a fascinating picture of easy life, beer and women" that had been presented to him, in the end he felt that it was simply "willed" that he should go.

== Early RAF service ==
On 20 March 1937, Hughes was granted a five-year short-service commission as a pilot officer in the RAF. Like some of his compatriots, he refused to exchange his dark-blue RAAF uniform for the lighter-coloured RAF one. He undertook advanced flying instruction at No. 2 Flying Training School in Digby, Lincolnshire. Slated to fly bombers, he appealed and in July was posted as a fighter pilot to No. 64 Squadron, which operated Hawker Demons out of RAF Martlesham Heath, Suffolk. The squadron was transferred to RAF Church Fenton, Yorkshire, in May 1938. Hughes was promoted to flying officer on 19 November. No. 64 Squadron subsequently received Bristol Blenheim 1F twin-engined fighters, and completed its conversion to the type in January 1939.

There's no use muttering about things... to my mind the chances of living through this are about equal anyhow, and that's all one can ask after all...

— Hughes to his brother shortly after the outbreak of World War II

Hughes was promoted to acting flight lieutenant in November 1939 and became a flight commander in the newly formed No. 234 Squadron, which, like No. 64 Squadron, came under the control of No. 13 Group in the north of England. On establishment the previous month at RAF Leconfield, East Yorkshire, No. 234 Squadron was equipped with Blenheims, Fairey Battles and Gloster Gauntlets; it began re-arming with Supermarine Spitfires in March 1940 and was operational two months later. The commanding officer, Squadron Leader Richard Barnett, rarely flew, and Hughes assumed responsibility for overseeing conversion to the Spitfire. "More experienced and more mature" than his fellow pilots, according to historian Stephen Bungay, the Australian "effectively led" No. 234 Squadron. By this time, Hughes had acquired a young Airedale Terrier known as Flying Officer Butch, who sometimes flew with him—against regulations. He had also met and begun dating Kathleen ("Kay") Brodrick of Hull. On 19 June, Hughes and his squadron transferred to RAF St Eval, Cornwall, under the jurisdiction of the newly formed No. 10 Group in south-west England.

== Battle of Britain ==
As the Battle of Britain got under way in July 1940, Hughes shared in No. 234 Squadron's first confirmed aerial victories. He and his section of two other Spitfires shot down a German Junkers Ju 88 attacking convoys near Lands End on 8 July, and another south-east of Plymouth during a dawn patrol on 28 July. A shared claim for a Ju 88 on 27 July could not be confirmed as destroyed; after a chase over the water at heights as low as 50 feet (15 m), the German escaped, despite being struck in the engines and cockpit, and was credited to the section as "damaged". German records, made available post-war, confirm that a Junkers 88A, piloted by Leutnant Ruckdeschel, was lost on this day. On 1 August, Hughes was seconded from No. 234 Squadron to help set up the only Gloster Gladiator-equipped unit to operate during the Battle of Britain, No. 247 (China British) Squadron in Plymouth. The same day, he married Kay Brodrick, who likened him to Errol Flynn, in the register office at Bodmin, Cornwall. Apart from Flying Officer Butch, the witnesses were strangers; Kay arrived alone, and no-one from No. 234 Squadron could attend. Barnett was transferred out of No. 234 Squadron on 13 August, and Hughes took temporary command until the arrival of Squadron Leader Joe "Spike" O'Brien four days later. By now the fighting was intensifying over southern England, and the squadron relocated from St Eval to RAF Middle Wallop, Hampshire, on 14 August. Almost immediately after Hughes landed the Luftwaffe bombed the airfield; several ground staff and civilian workers were killed, but No. 234 Squadron's Spitfires escaped damage.

No-one had more air sense than Pat ... his only problem was that he got too close but that was his way.

— Joe Roddis, Hughes's fitter

It was following No. 234 Squadron's move to Middle Wallop that Hughes began to score heavily against German fighters. On 15 August, in one of the costliest engagements of the Battle of Britain, known thereafter to the Luftwaffe as "Black Thursday", Hughes claimed victories (one of them shared) over two Messerschmitt Bf 110s. He again achieved dual success on 16, 18 and 26 August, all six victims being Messerschmitt Bf 109s brought down in the vicinity of the Isle of Wight. Whereas in July he had fired at his targets from a range of 150 to 50 yards (137 to 46 m), it was now his habit to close to 30 yards (27 m), approximately three Spitfire lengths, before delivering his final burst; he also made head-on attacks against enemy aircraft. He had a narrow escape on the 16th after his second victory of the day, when he chased a quartet of Junkers Ju 87s and had his tailplane shot up from behind by another Bf 109; he dived and forced the German to overshoot, then broke off having exhausted his ammunition firing at his former attacker. In the pub with Kay and his squadron mates that evening, Hughes jokingly told his wife, "In case of accidents make sure you marry again."

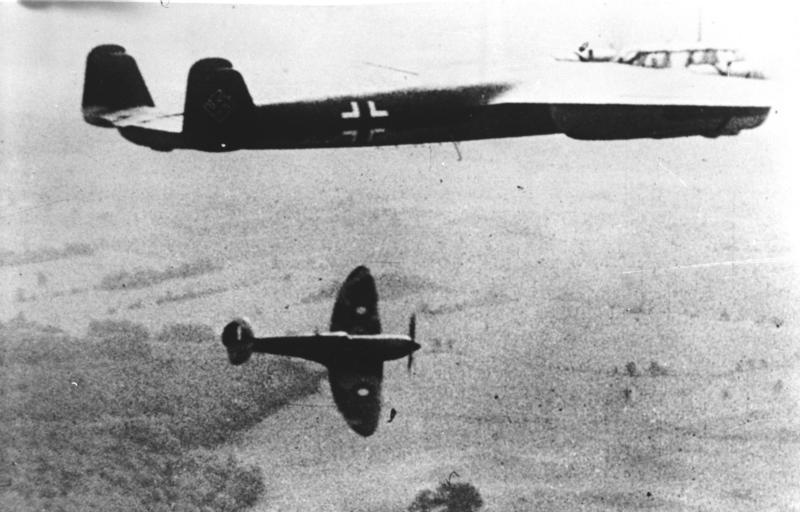
Dornier Do 17 and Supermarine Spitfire, 1940

On 3 September, Hughes's promotion to substantive flight lieutenant was promulgated in The London Gazette. He claimed three Me 110s in the space of fifteen minutes south of Haslemere on 4 September, two Bf 109s while patrolling Kenley the following day, and a Bf 109 destroyed plus one probable near Dover on 6 September; he had to break off combat with the last-mentioned when its tanks ruptured, covering Hughes's canopy in oil. One of his victims on 5 September may have been Oberleutnant Franz von Werra, who was captured and subsequently became famous as "the one that got away". Hughes and his protégé, Bob Doe, claimed half of No. 234 Squadron's victories between mid-August and early September.

Hughes was killed in action on the evening of 7 September 1940, after he intercepted a Dornier Do 17 bomber taking part in a large-scale attack on London. His Spitfire crashed in a field between Sundridge and Bessels Green in Kent. He apparently bailed out, but his parachute failed to open; his body was found in a garden on Main Road, Sundridge, not far from the wreck of his Spitfire. The Dornier came down in the River Darent. No. 234 Squadron lost its commanding officer, O'Brien, in the same action. Mystery surrounds exactly how Hughes came to grief, though his close-in tactics are believed to have played a major part in it. The strain of regular combat without respite, manifesting itself in fatigue and spots before the eyes, may also have contributed. He is generally thought to have collided with flying wreckage from the crippled German bomber, rendering his Spitfire uncontrollable. It is also possible that Hughes accidentally rammed his target. Further speculation suggested that he was the victim of friendly fire from another British fighter attacking the same Dornier, or was struck by German bullets from a Bf 109. Some observers on the ground, including collier Charles Hall, maintained that Hughes rammed the Dornier on purpose. Four days after his death, No. 234 Squadron was moved back to the relative quiet of Cornwall.

== Legacy ==
Everyone talks about the wrong people ... the self-publicists. Now who has ever heard of Pat Hughes? He saved our squadron, and he shot down a lot more than others I could name. But he died you see. That was a blow.

— Bob Doe, quoted in 2000

The top-scoring Australian flying ace of the Battle of Britain and one of fourteen Australian fighter pilots killed during the battle, Hughes has been described as "the inspiration and driving force behind No. 234 Squadron RAF". He is generally credited with seventeen confirmed victories—fourteen solo and three shared. This tally puts him among the top ten Allied Battle of Britain aces. It also ranks him among the three highest-scoring Australians of World War II, after Clive Caldwell with thirty victories (twenty-seven solo and three shared) and Adrian Goldsmith with seventeen (sixteen solo and one shared).

A war widow after barely five weeks of marriage, Kay Hughes was inconsolable in her loss: "I wept until I could cry no more." Flying Officer Butch ran out of the mess on the day of his master's death, and was never seen again. Following a service at St James', Sutton-on-Hull, on 13 September 1940, Hughes was buried in the churchyard at Row G, Grave 4. A week later, Kay discovered she was pregnant, but eventually miscarried. She subsequently drove ambulances for the British war effort. News of his son's marriage came as "a complete surprise" to Percy Hughes, who only learned of his daughter-in-law's existence from the Australian Air Board's casualty letter. Having married three more times after Hughes's death, Kay died on 28 June 1983 aged 66 and, in accordance with her wishes, her ashes were buried with her first husband, whose headstone was amended to read "In loving memory of his wife Kathleen."

Hughes was posthumously awarded the Distinguished Flying Cross (DFC) on 22 October 1940 for his "skill and determination" as a flight commander and "gallantry in his attacks on the enemy"; Squadron Leader O'Brien had recommended the decoration a week before their deaths. Kay was presented with the medal at Buckingham Palace on 23 June 1942. In Australia, Hughes is commemorated at Christ's Church, Kiama, with a memorial tablet placed by his sister Muriel. A special memorial is dedicated to him at Monaghan Hayes Place, Cooma. His name appears on the Battle of Britain Roll of Honour in Westminster Abbey, and on supplementary panel 12 in the Commemorative Area of the Australian War Memorial (AWM), Canberra. The AWM also holds his DFC and service medals in its collection. Kay had given the medals to her sisters-in-law to pass on to Percy in the 1950s and, after being lost during an Anzac Day parade in the 1960s, they went through several family members' hands before turning up in the safe of the Kiama Country Women's Association; they were donated to the AWM in 1990. On 7 September 2005, Charles Hall's sons dedicated a plaque in Hughes's honour at the house where he fell in Main Road, Sundridge; Bob Doe attended, expressing his thanks for "an Australian who came to help us when we needed him". Shoreham Aircraft Museum in Kent unveiled a memorial stone to Hughes at Sundridge on 23 August 2008. On 15 September 2014, the AWM's daily Last Post Ceremony was dedicated to Hughes's memory.

== Combat record ==
No.	Date	Flying	Foe	Result	Location
1	8 July 1940	Spitfire	Junkers Ju 88	Destroyed (shared)	SE Lands End
–	27 July 1940	Spitfire	Junkers Ju 88	Damaged (shared)	SE Lands End
2	28 July 1940	Spitfire	Junkers Ju 88	Destroyed (shared)	SE Plymouth
3	15 August 1940	Spitfire	Messerschmitt Bf 110	Destroyed	Middle Wallop – Isle of Wight
4	15 August 1940	Spitfire	Messerschmitt Bf 110	Destroyed (shared)	SW Swanage
5	16 August 1940	Spitfire	Messerschmitt Bf 109E	Destroyed	Isle of Wight
6	16 August 1940	Spitfire	Messerschmitt Bf 109E	Destroyed	Isle of Wight
7	18 August 1940	Spitfire	Messerschmitt Bf 109E	Destroyed	Isle of Wight
8	18 August 1940	Spitfire	Messerschmitt Bf 109E	Destroyed	Isle of Wight
9	26 August 1940	Spitfire	Messerschmitt Bf 109E	Destroyed	Isle of Wight
10	26 August 1940	Spitfire	Messerschmitt Bf 109E	Destroyed	Isle of Wight
11	4 September 1940	Spitfire	Messerschmitt Bf 110	Destroyed	Haslemere–Brighton
12	4 September 1940	Spitfire	Messerschmitt Bf 110	Destroyed	Haslemere–Brighton
13	4 September 1940	Spitfire	Messerschmitt Bf 110	Destroyed	Haslemere–Brighton
14	5 September 1940	Spitfire	Messerschmitt Bf 109E	Destroyed	Eastchurch
15	5 September 1940	Spitfire	Messerschmitt Bf 109E	Destroyed	S Manston
16	6 September 1940	Spitfire	Messerschmitt Bf 109E	Destroyed	Dover
–	6 September 1940	Spitfire	Messerschmitt Bf 109E	Probable	Dover
17	7 September 1940	Spitfire	Dornier Do 17	Destroyed	London–Brighton
