= Granville-Avranches-Sourdeval tramway =

Coordinates: 48.83653194917484°N 1.602469970145911°W

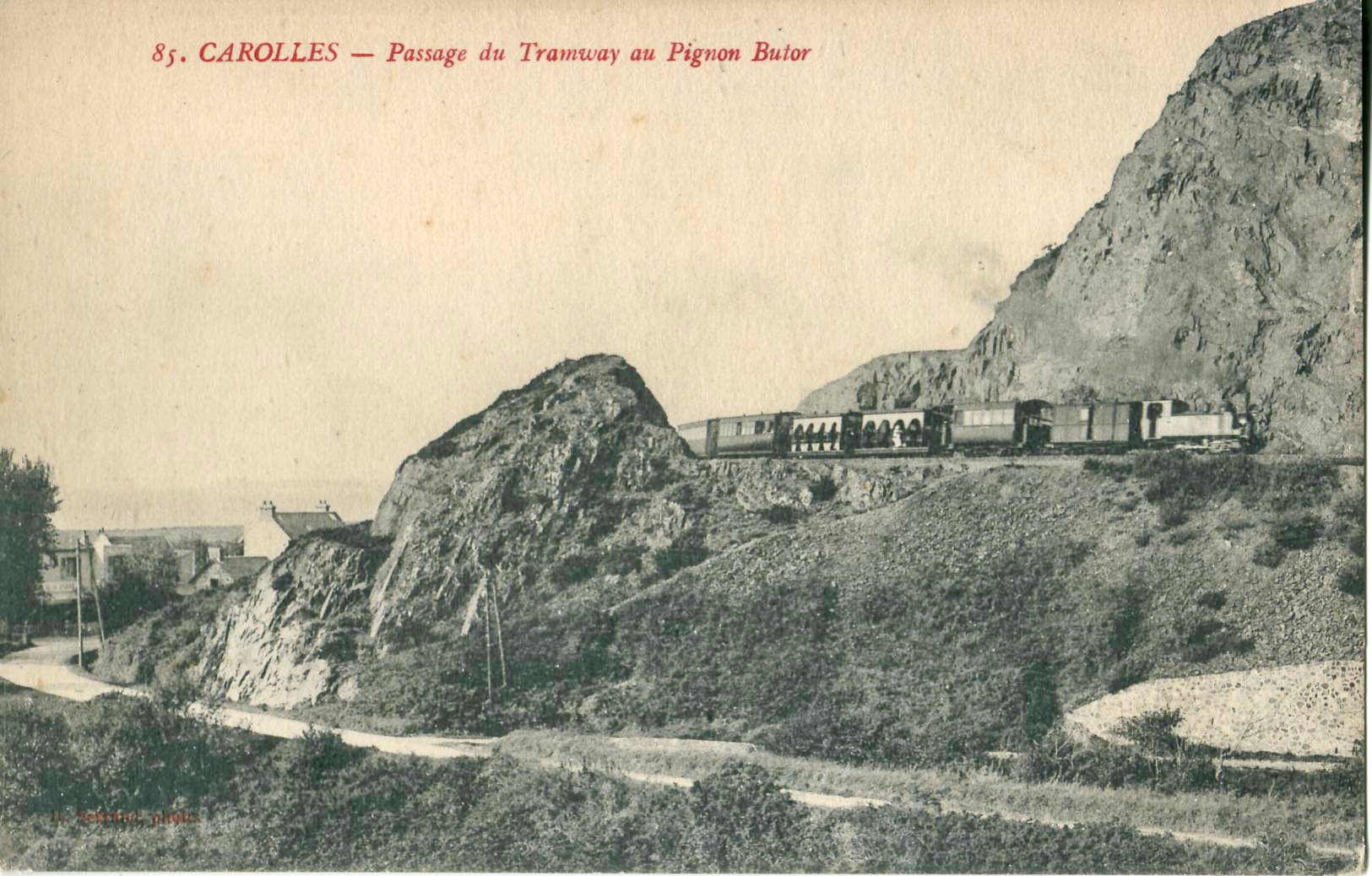
- Passage of the Tramway at Pignon Butor

Technical
- Line length: 71 km (44.12 mi)
- Track gauge: 1,000 mm (3 ft 3 3/8 in)

The Granville-Avranches-Sourdeval tramway was a 71 km (44 mi) long 1,000 mm (3 ft 3 3/8 in) gauge railway from Condé-sur-Vire via Granville to Avranches in the Manche department of the Normandy region, which operated from 1908 to 1935.

== History ==
The line opened in 1908, at a similar time as the Condé-Granville tramway and the Coutances-Lessay metre gauge railway. These lines were operated by the Société des Chemins de Fer de la Manche (CFM) until 1935.
