= Trams in Deauville =

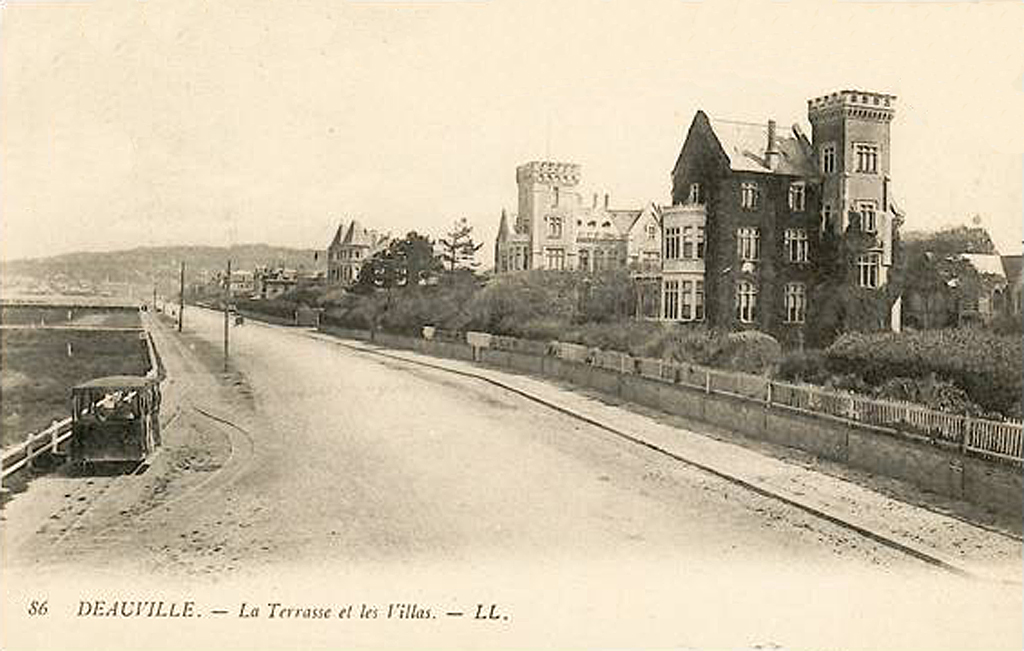

The Tramway de Deauville was a small 600 mm (1 ft 11 5/8 in) narrow gauge tramway system serving the balneary station of Deauville, France.

Inaugurated in 1876, the network consisted of a line stretching Avenue de la République across the town centre. Traction was by horse and transport without concessions. The tram closed in 1905.
