= Choloy-Ménillot =

- Commune
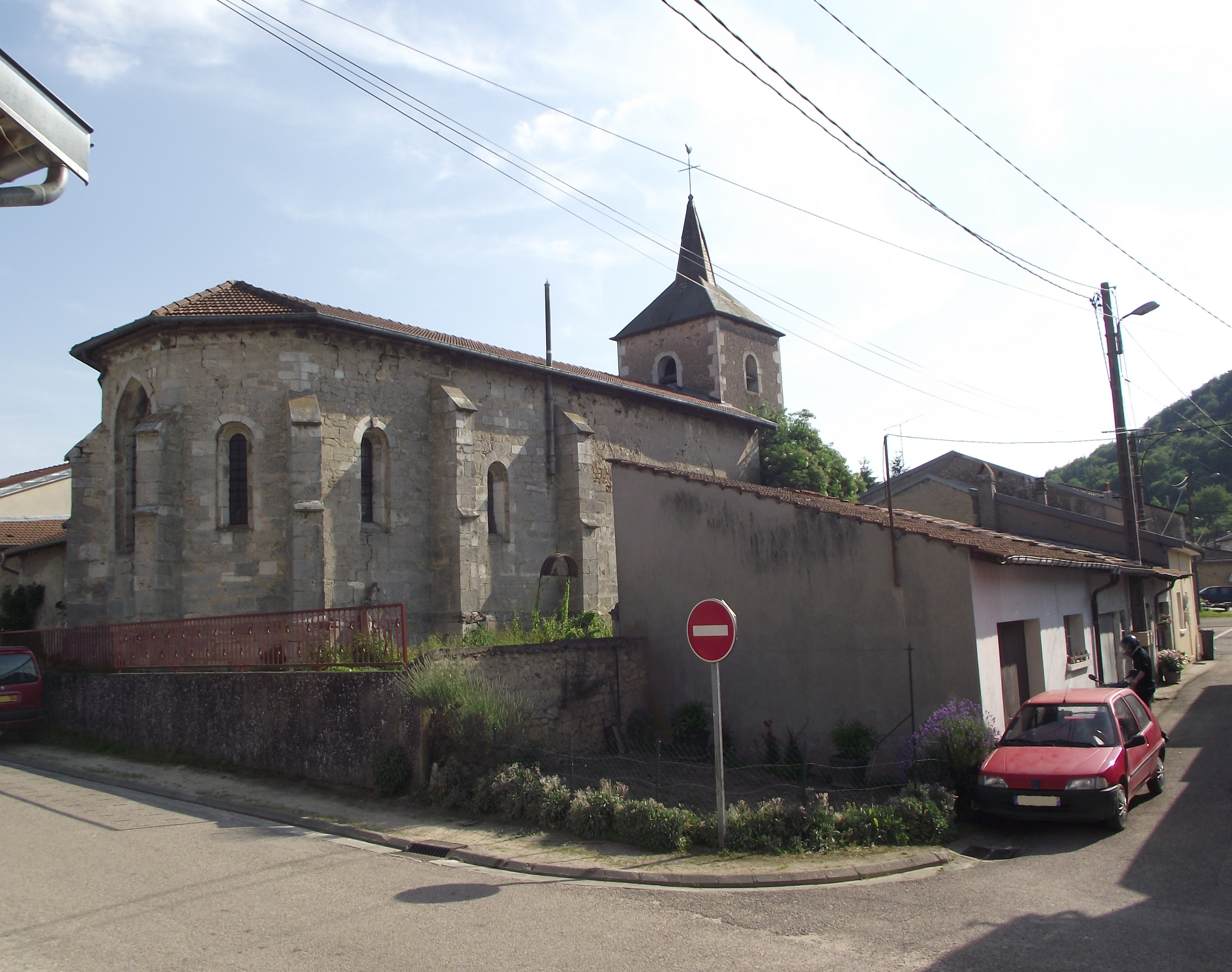
- The church in Ménillot

- Coat of arms
- Location of Choloy-Ménillot
- Location within France Location within Grand Est
- Coordinates: 48°39′45″N 5°49′11″E
- Country: France
- Region: Grand Est
- Department: Meurthe-et-Moselle
- Arrondissement: Toul
- Canton: Toul

Government
  - Mayor (2020–2026): Pierre Varis
- Area^{1}: 11.95 km^{2} (4.61 sq mi)
- Elevation: 249 m (817 ft)
- Highest elevation: 412 m (1,352 ft)
- Lowest elevation: 226 m (741 ft)
- Population (2023): 700
  - Density: 59/km^{2} (150/sq mi)
- Time zone: UTC+01:00 (CET)
  - Summer (DST): UTC+02:00 (CEST)
- INSEE/Postal code: 54128 /54200
- ^{1} French Land Register data, which excludes lakes, ponds, glaciers > 1 km^{2} (0.386 sq mi or 247 acres) and river estuaries.

Choloy-Ménillot (French pronunciation: [ʃɔlwa menilo]) is a commune in the Meurthe-et-Moselle department in north-eastern France.

It is located 28 kilometres west of Nancy and 5 kilometres west of Toul.

Near the village is the Royal Canadian Air Force Cemetery Choloy, which contains the remains of Canadian military personnel or their family members who died while serving with the Canadian No. 1 Air Division during the Cold War period of the 1950s and 1960s. It also contains graves of Canadian and Commonwealth aircrew who died in World War II, including: RCAF pilot Andy Watson, 21, from Hamilton, Ont., who stayed with his Lancaster while the rest of the crew; Australian Hurricane pilot Les Clisby, who died during the Battle of France in 1940, and was the first RAF ace of the war to be lost in action; and New Zealand Hurricane pilot Cobber Kain, first RAF ace of the war, who also died during the Battle of France.

== See also ==
- Chemin de fer du Val de Passey
- Communes of the Meurthe-et-Moselle department
