= PO Corrèze =

P.O. Corrèze
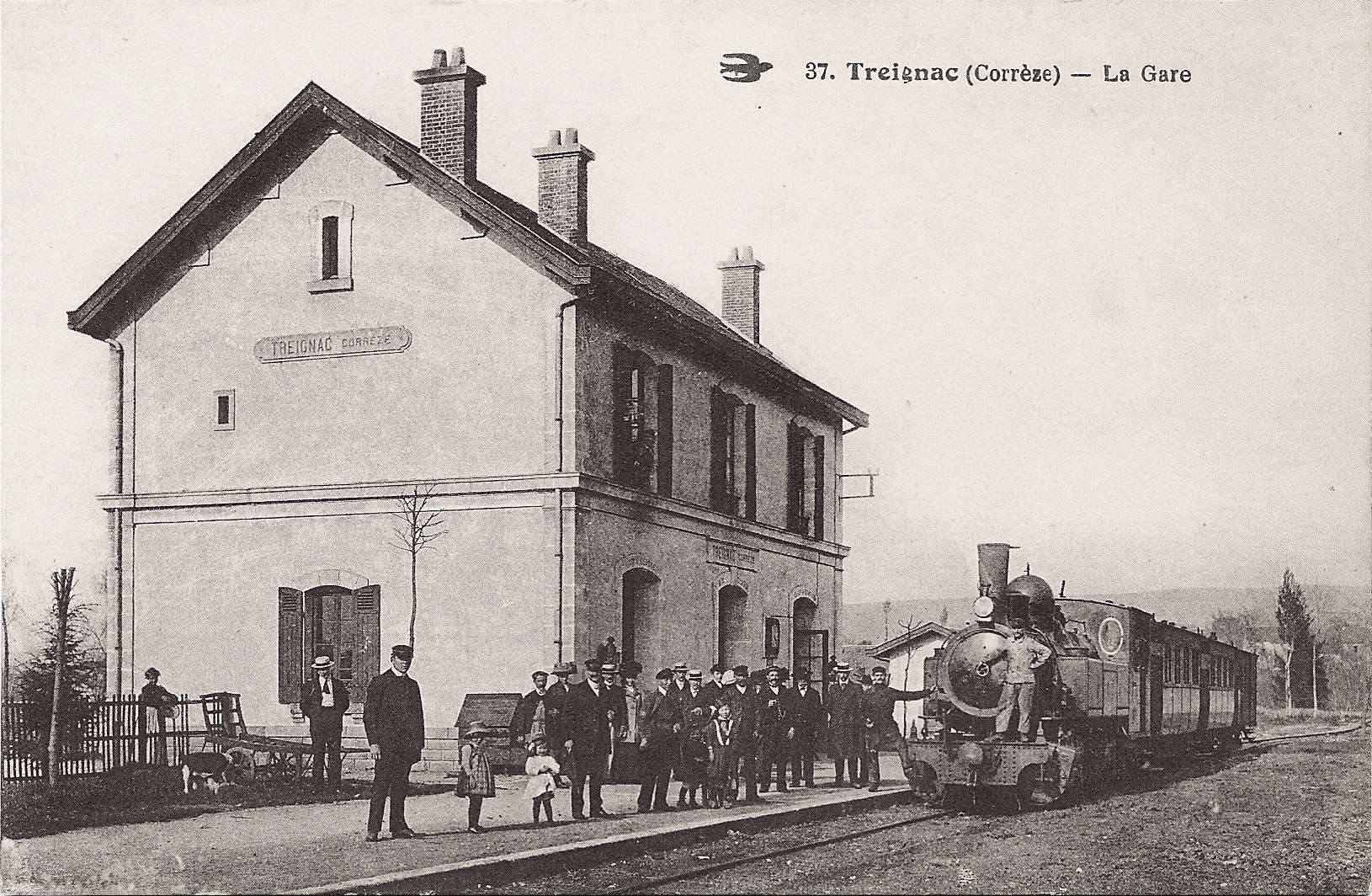
- Passenger train powered by 0-4-4-0 Mallet tank locomotive from series 101–104 at the Treignac station.

Overview
- Status: Closed
- Owner: Chemin de fer de Paris à Orléans (until 1938); SNCF (from 1938)
- Locale: Limousin region of France
- Termini: Uzerche; Argentat
- Stations: 20

History
- Opened: 1904
- Closed: 1970

Technical
- Line length: 65.5 km (40.7 miles)
- Track length: 94.6 km (58.8 miles)
- Track gauge: 1,000 mm (3 ft 3 3/8 in) metre gauge

The PO Corrèze (POC) is a former metre-gauge railway in the Corrèze department in central France. The concession was granted to the Chemin de Fer de Paris à Orléans (PO) and constructed by the Société de Construction des Batignolles. Together with the Chemin de fer du Blanc-Argent and the Blois à Saint Aignan, they formed the metre-gauge network of the PO.

The centre of the railway was at Tulle, where there was a connection with the SNCF, and consisted of three lines:

- From Tulle, north to Uzerche and a connection with the standard gauge PO (later SNCF) lines,
- From Tulle, south to Argentat,
- From Seillac, a branch headed east to Treignac.

There was also a connection with the Tramways de Corrèze (TC) at Saint Bonnet Avalouze. TC used POC tracks to reach Tulle.

The entire line was opened in 1904. It was closed to passengers on 3 November 1969 and to freight on 31 May 1970.

Steam traction was used throughout the duration of operation. Diesel traction appeared in the 1930s for passenger service in the form of autorails (railcars). Diesel locomotives arrived in 1962 to power the freight trains.

== Permanent way ==
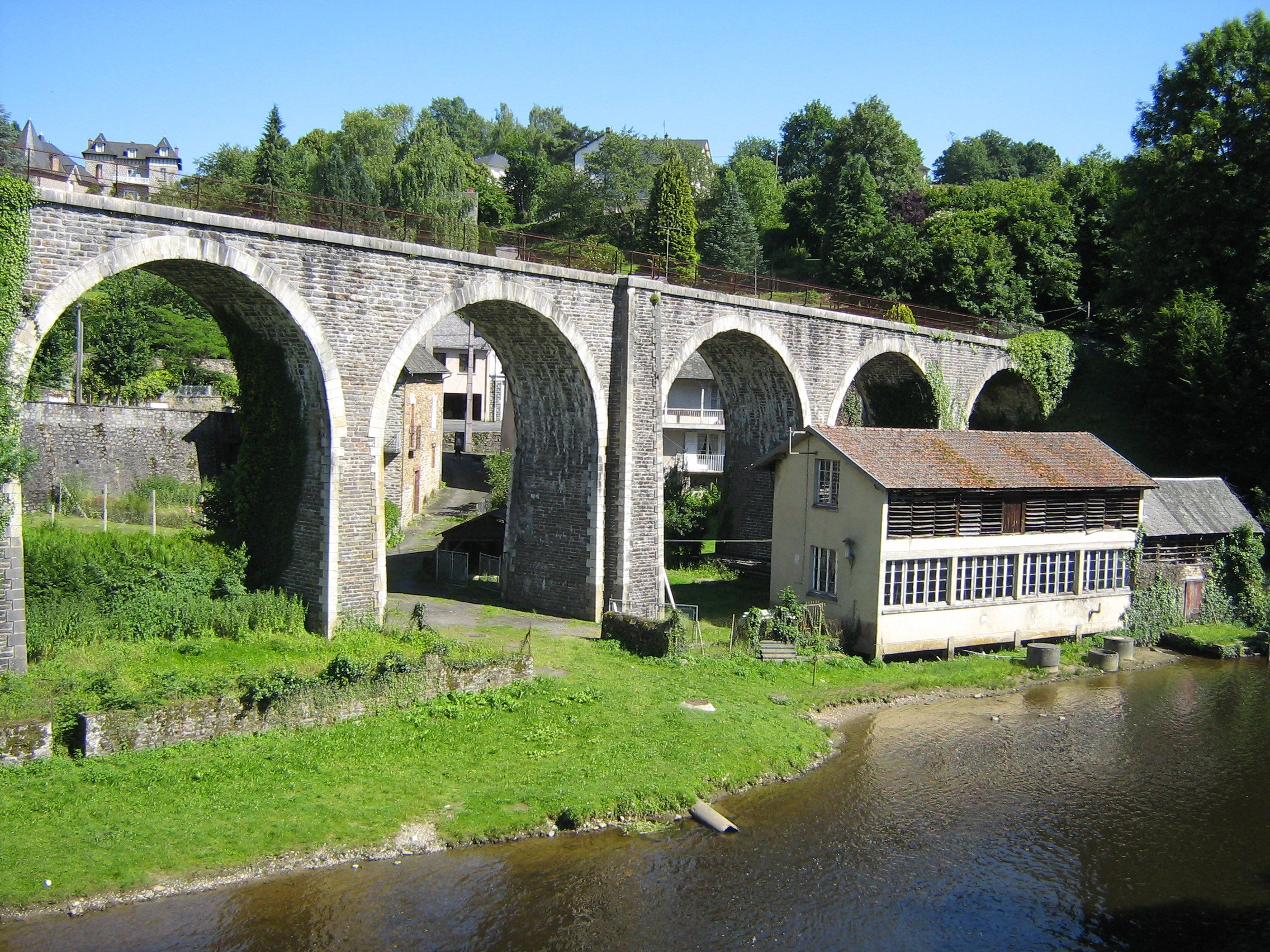
Viaduct at Uzerche

Due to the difficult terrain, it was necessary to build a number of bridges, viaducts and tunnels.

Tulle–Uzerche

- Viaduct of 7 arches of 10 m across the Cérrone, length 94 metres (308 ft)
- Viaduct of 5 arches of 8.5 m across the Cérrone, length 62 metres (203 ft)
- Viaduct of 5 arches of 10 m across the Cérrone, length 75 metres (246 ft)
- Viaduct of 4 arches of 10 m across the Vézère, length 55 metres (180 ft)
- Viaduct of 11 arches of 10 m and one of 12 m across the GC3, length 152 metres (499 ft)
- 80-metre (260 ft) long Tulle Tunnel
- 60-metre (200 ft) long Puy l'Évêque Tunnel,
- 98-metre (322 ft) long Sainte Eulalie Tunnel,

Tulle–Argentat

- 22-metre (72 ft) long steel bridge over the Corrèze (river)
- Viaduct of 4 arches of 10 across the Corrèze, length 56 metres (184 ft)
- 1,378-metre (4,521 ft) long Pandrines Tunnel.

== Stations ==
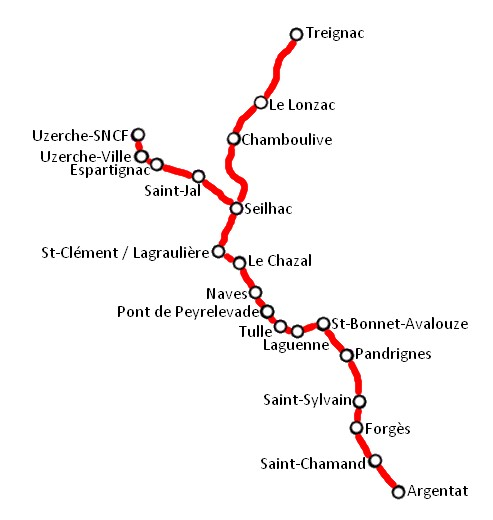

The station buildings were built in the style of the PO, with a combined station house and goods shed, with the roof extended over the loading dock. The stations at Tulle and Uzerche shared facilities with the SNCF.

Tulle–Argentat (33.6 km or 20.9 miles)

- Tulle
- Laguenne
- Saint-Bonnet-Avalouse
- Pandrignrd - Saint Paul
- Saint-Sylvian (Corrèze)
- Forgès
- Saint-Chamas (Corrèze)
- Argentat

Tulle–Uzerche (31.9 km or 19.8 miles)

- Tulle
- Naves
- Saint Clément - Lagraulière
- Seilhac
- Saint-Jul
- Uzerche

Seilhac–Treignac (29.0 km or 18.0 miles)

- Seilhac
- Chamboulive
- Le Lonzac
- Treignac

== Rolling stock ==
=== Steam locomotives ===
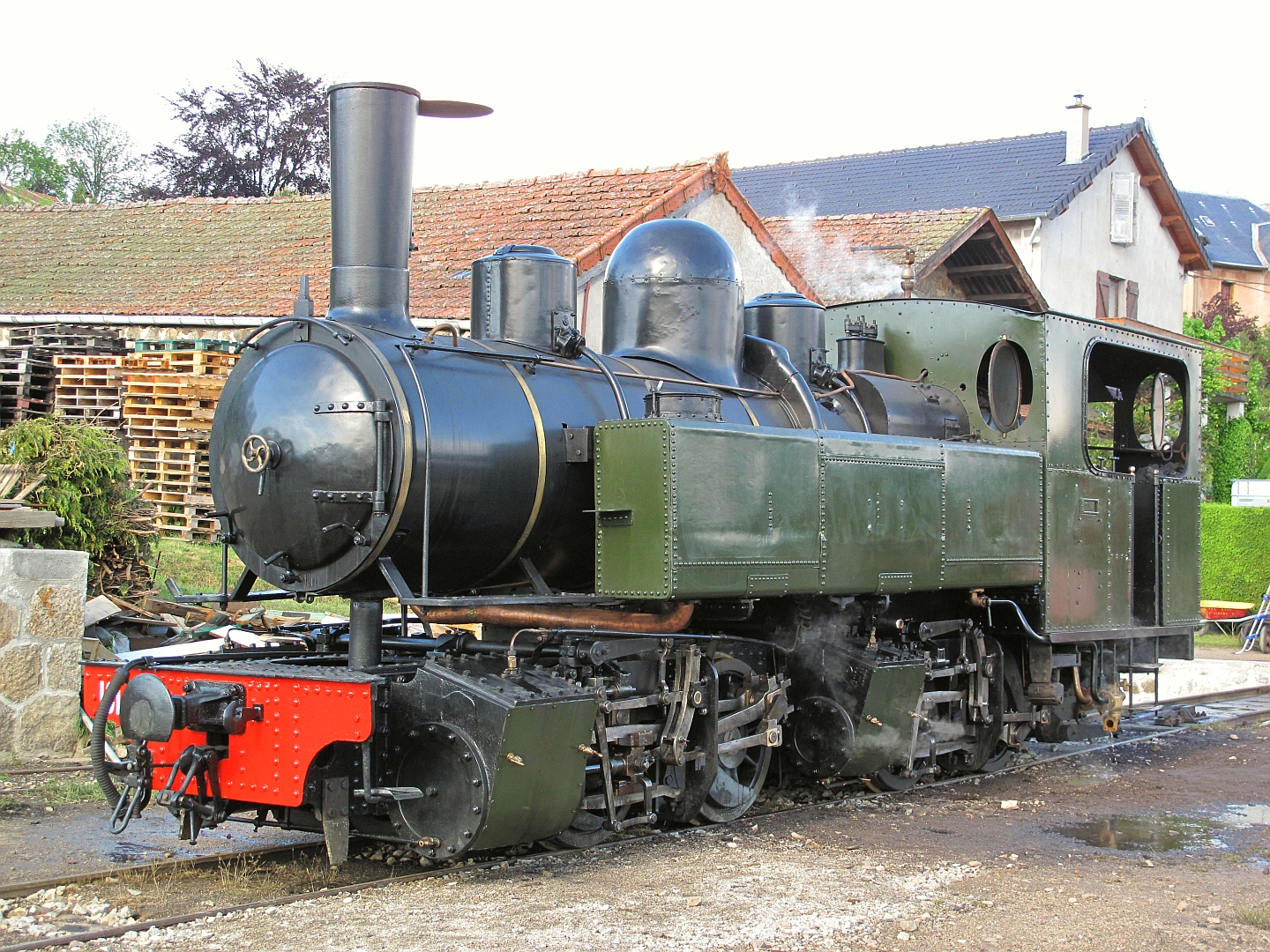
Mallet N°101 on the Voies Ferrées du Velay, at Tence, May 2011.

Ten 2-4-0 tank locomotives were built by the Société de Construction des Batignolles for the opening of the line. Four 0-4-4-0 Mallet tank locomotives were ordered from Ateliers de construction du Nord de la France (Blanc-Misseron), who subcontracted the order to Ateliers de Tubize.

No.	W.A.	Manufacturer	Serial No.	Year	Comments
61	2-4-0T	Batignolles	1471	1903	
62	2-4-0T	Batignolles	1472	1903	
63	2-4-0T	Batignolles	1473	1903	to Chemin de fer du Blanc-Argent
64	2-4-0T	Batignolles	1474	1903	to Chemins de fer départementaux de la Meuse
65	2-4-0T	Batignolles	1475	1903	
66	2-4-0T	Batignolles	1476	1903	to Chemins de fer départementaux de la Meuse
67	2-4-0T	Batignolles	1477	1903	to Chemins de fer départementaux de la Meuse
68	2-4-0T	Batignolles	1478	1903	to Chemins de fer départementaux de la Meuse
69	2-4-0T	Batignolles	1479	1903	to Limagne
70	2-4-0T	Batignolles	1480	1903	
101	0-4-4-0T	Blanc-Misseron / Tubize	337 / 1473	1906	Preserved at the Voies ferrées du Velay
102	0-4-4-0T	Blanc-Misseron / Tubize	338 / 1474	1906	
103	0-4-4-0T	Blanc-Misseron / Tubize	339 / 1475	1906	to Chemins de fer départementaux de la Meuse
104	0-4-4-0T	Blanc-Misseron / Tubize	340 / 1476	1906	Preserved at the Chemin de fer du Vivarais

=== Diesel locomotives ===
- 401–402, 32-tonnes loco-tractors built by CFD Montmirail and delivered on 1962.

=== Autorails (railcars) ===
- X 211 and X 212, type X 210 built by SCF Verney in 1951

=== Carriages and wagons ===
Passenger carriages

- 38 four-wheel carriages with outside platforms
- 1 first-third composite saloon AC2f No. 1
- 11 28-seat first-third composites AC3 Nos. 2–10, AC3f Nos. 11–12
- 18 39-seat third class AC4f Nos. 21–38
- 9 passenger luggage vans DPf Nos. 51–59

Goods vehicles

- Covered van K 96–100, 5.5 tonnes, 1904
- Covered van K 101–125, 5.5 tonnes, 1904, series saw service on the Chemins de fer départementaux de la Meuse
- Covered van with brake compartment Kf 126–140, 6 tonnes, 1906
- Covered van with brake compartment Kf 141–150, 6 tonnes, 1908
- Open wagon I 201–225, 5 tonnes, 1904
- Open wagon I 226–230, 5 tonnes, 1908
- Open wagon I 231–245, 5 tonnes, 1925
- Flat wagon HH 301–320, 4 tonnes, 1904
- Flat wagon with brake, HHf 321–335, 4 tonnes, 1904
- Flat wagon with brake, HHf 336–350, 4 tonnes, 1912
- Flat wagon, HH 351–356, 4 tonnes, 1904
- Flat wagon (sleepers), L 401–402, 4 tonnes, 1904

== Additional stock ==
A number of vehicles have also run on the PO-Corrèze

- De Dion-Bouton autorails from the Réseau des Tramways de l'Ain, Nos. 51–56
- An 0-6-6-0 Mallet tank locomotive from the Chemin de Fer du Blanc-Argent, No. 41
- Billard type A 80D autorail from the Réseau de la Dordogne, CFD Nos. 601–605, 607, 609, 611
- Three bogie passenger carriages from the Tramways de la Sarthe, Nos. B 39–41
- Four Billard type A 80D from the Chemin de Fer du Blanc-Argent in 1968, Nos. 31–32, 311–312
- A railcar and trailer from the Réseau Breton, Nos. X 153 and RL 5
- Approximately 100 goods wagons from the Réseau Breton
- Four sleeper flat wagons from the Chemin de Fer du Blanc-Argent, Nos. 501–502, 601–602

== Notes and references ==
- Davies, John (November 2003). Société Nationale des Chemins de fer Français Locomotive List 1938–1975. Woodbridge, Queensland: Dr. John Davies. p. 90. ISBN 0-9585541-2-9.

== Bibliography ==
- « Le PO Corrèze », dans Chemins de Fer Régionaux et Urbains, vol. 1969-III, no 93, Mai-Juin 1969
- Lanoue, Banaudo & Lanoue, Fabrice (2003). Sur les rails du Limousin (in French). de Borée. pp. 66–68, 144–149. ISBN 2-84494-204-0.
