= Chemin de fer du Blanc-Argent =

Railway in the region of Centre-Val de Loire, France

The Chemin de Fer du Blanc-Argent (pronounced [ʃəmɛ̃ d(ə) fɛʁ dy blɑ̃ aʁʒɑ̃]; BA) is a 1,000 mm (3 ft 3 3/8 in) gauge railway in the region of Centre-Val de Loire, France, part of which is still open to traffic, whilst another section is now operated as a heritage railway.

== History ==
The BA was conceived as a standard-gauge cross-country route linking lines of the Chemin de Fer de Paris à Orléans (PO). Although the original scheme was abandoned, the PO built the line as a single-track metre-gauge railway, linking Argent with Le Blanc, and running through the departments of Loiret, Loir-et-Cher and Indre.

The line had a total length of 191 kilometres (119 mi), with headquarters at Romorantin. It opened in 1901 and remained intact until 1951, when the first closures took place. All traffic was steam hauled until the early 1930s, when Billard railcars were introduced to handle some of the passenger traffic. Steam locomotives were operated until the 1950s. In 1981, the Centre region and SNCF agreed to rebuild the four Verney railcars, and built two new ones. The timetable was reorganised to give better connections with the SNCF. The BA became part of TER in 1987. Freight traffic on the BA ended in 1989.

== The lines ==
The BA was divided into five sections operationally.

Argent – Salbris	Closed to passengers in 1939. Argent - Clemont was the first section to close completely, in 1951. Clémont - Salbris closed to freight in 1973
Salbris – Romorantin	Open to passengers.
Romorantin – Valençay	Open.
Valençay – Luçay-le-Mâle	Closed in October 2009 after a safety inspection. There is a replacement bus service.
Luçay-le-Mâle – Buzançais	Closed to passengers in 1980, freight in 1989. Used by the preservation society Luçay-le-Mâle - Argy, Argy - Buzançais rebuilt to standard gauge.
Buzançais – Le Blanc	Closed to passengers in September 1953 and freight in December 1953.

== Rolling stock ==
=== Steam locomotives ===
- Eight 0-6-0T locomotives (Nos. 21–28) ordered from ANF Blanc-Misseron, who subcontracted to Ateliers de Tubize.
- Eight 0-6-0T locomotives (Nos. 29–36) built by Buffaud & Robatel.
- One 2-4-0T locomotives (No. 63) built by Batignolles. Transferred from PO Corrèze in 1946.
- Two 0-6-2T locomotives (Nos. 42–43); built by SACM for the Société Générale des Chemins de fer Économiques, sold to SNCF in 1940.
- One 0-6-6-0T locomotive (No. 41); built by Corpet-Louvet in 1912 for CF Centre (No. 103); sold to Tramways de l'Ain; sold to SNCF for B-A as No. 41 in 1938; to PO Corréze in 1946; to Réseau Breton in 1953.

=== Railcars ===
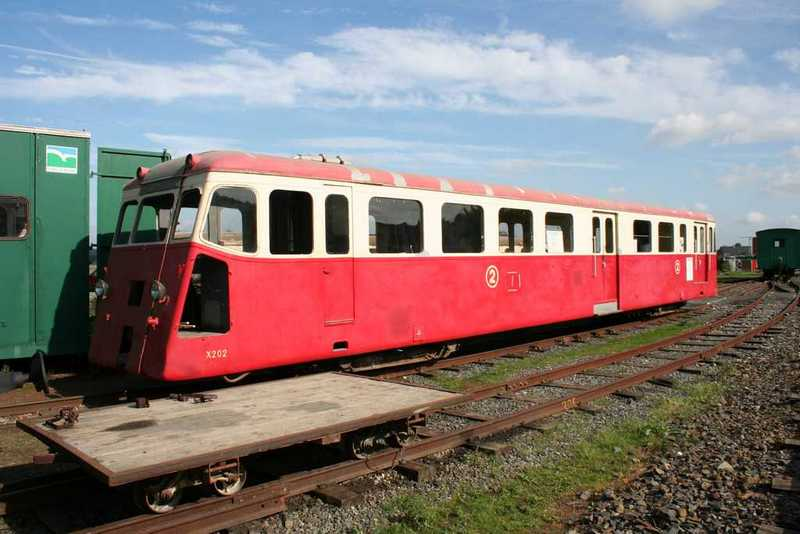
X202 as preserved

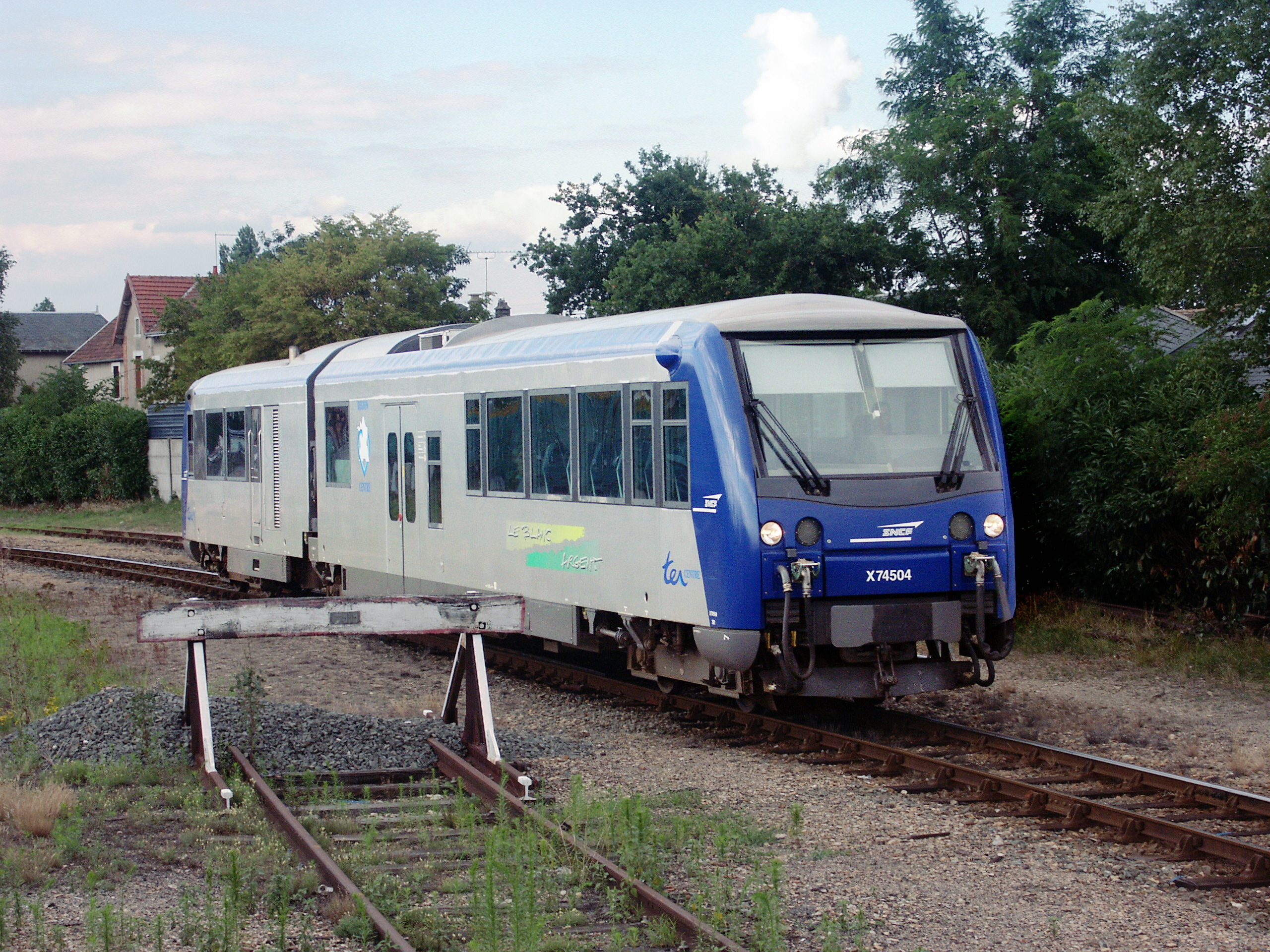
X74504 leaving Salbris station

- Four Billard railcars, introduced in the 1950s, ex CFD Charentes et Deux Sèvres.
- Four SCF Verney railcars, built 1950. Two more were transferred from the PO Corrèze in 1968.
- Two CFD railcars built 1984.
- X201–X206 De Dion-Bouton OC2 railcars. Transferred from the Réseau Breton in 1967. Only X202 and X205 put in service, the rest were used as spares sources. X202 now preserved in Brittany.
- X74501–X74505 CFD-Bagnères twin railcars, entered service in 2001.

=== Diesel locomotives ===
- 11–14 CFD 0-6-0 diesel locotracteur, Nos. 13 and 14 built on the frames of steam locomotives 25 and 28. No. 12 now on the Chemin de Fer de la Baie de Somme, Nos. 13–14 still working on the BA.

== Preservation ==
Part of the line between Lucay-le-Male and Buzançais has been preserved by the Société d'Animation du Blanc-Argent (SABA). The final section, between Argy and Buzançais, has been converted to standard gauge to serve a local agricultural industry so Argy is the southern terminus of the preserved part of the line.

=== Preserved stock ===
- 11 Corpet-Louvet 0-4-0T, ex enterprises Paul Frot.
- X224 Verney railcar.
- X205 De Dion-Bouton OC2 railcar.
- X206 De Dion-Bouton OC2 railcar.
- 713 Renault Draisine built 1930.
- 208 Billard draisine built 1968.
- 56115 Deutz 4w diesel, ex Euskirchener Kreisbahn and mine-musée du Blégny, Belgium.
- 56116 Deutz 4w diesel, details as 56115.
- Brookville 4w diesel, works number 3162.1945. Ex US Army. Reconstructed in 2002 with hedge flail
- COMESSA 4w diesel, built 1935.
- 4 0-6-0 diesel built on chassis of a Couillet steam locomotive, works number 693/1884. Ex CF Indre-et-Loire Nord and CF Seine et Marne et Yonne.
- Various open wagons and vans. Passenger carriages are four wheeled ex Switzerland and also some converted from goods vans.
