= Chemin de fer du Val de Passey =

Heritage railway in Grand Est, France

Coordinates: 48.650739°N 5.806193°E

Chemin de Fer du Val de Passey
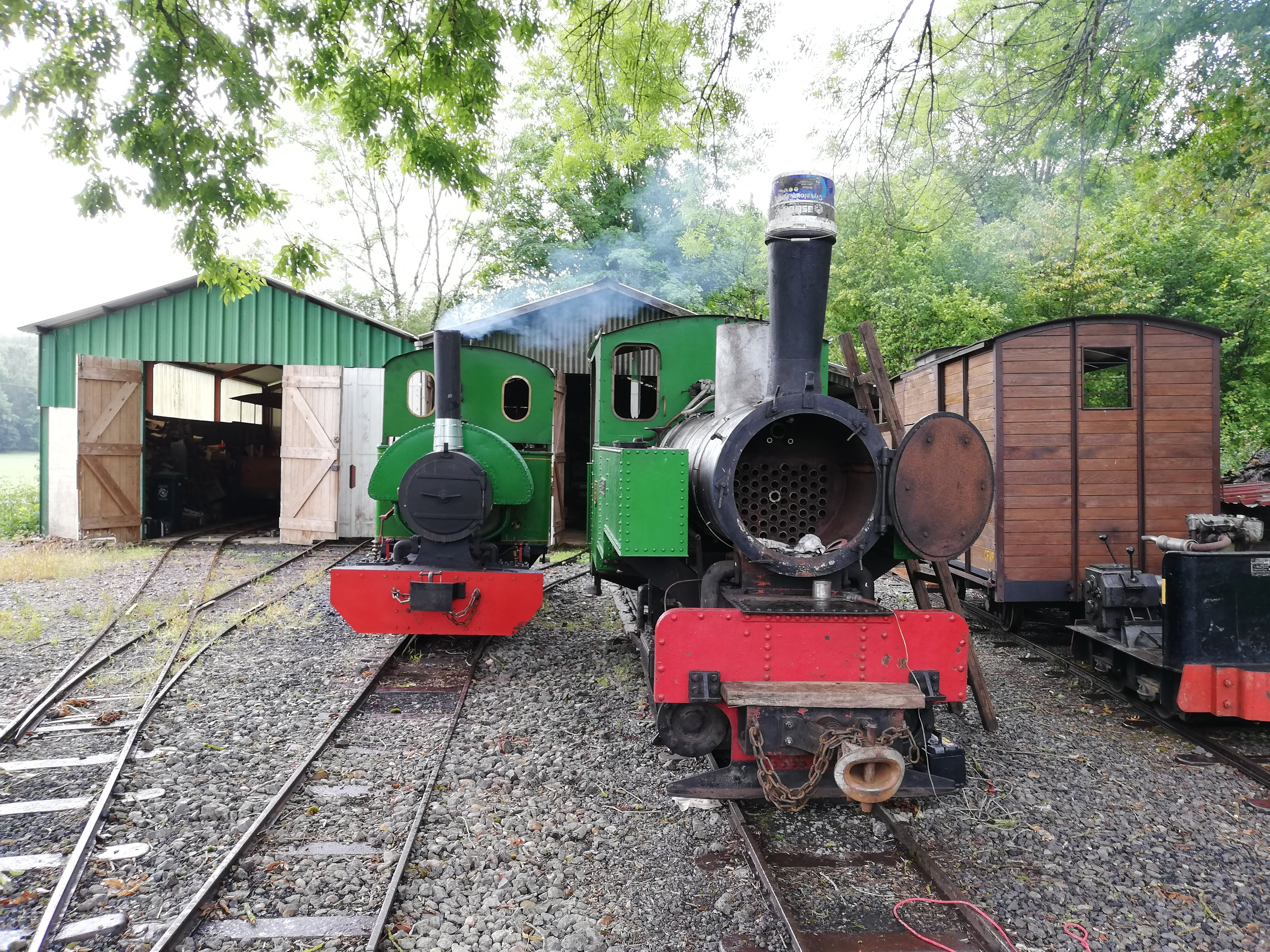

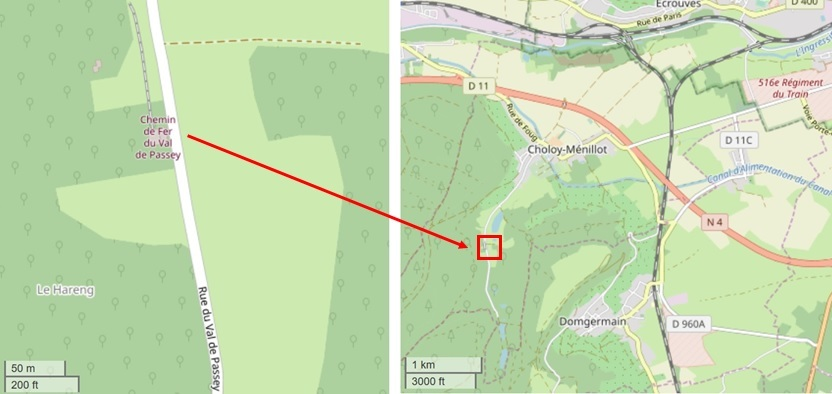
- Locomotives, route and location

Technical
- Line length: 0.8 kilometres (0.50 mi)
- Track gauge: 600 mm (1 ft 11 5/8 in)

The Chemin de fer du Val de Passey is a 0.8 km (0.5 mi) long heritage railway with 600 mm (1 ft 11 5/8 in) gauge near Choloy-Ménillot southwest of Toul in France.

== History ==
The narrow-gauge railway was constructed by the banker Jaques Maginot (born 19 August 1927; died 24 September 1998) on his private property and has been operated by a foundation as a museum railway on 5-6 running days per year since his death.

In 1968, Jaques Maginot found the Bagnall saddle steam locomotive Charles in Belgium in need of renovation. During a general overhaul, he completely disassembled it and rebuilt it according to the original drawings using the original boiler. In 1972 and 1975 he built two wood-clad passenger coaches with 18 and 12 seats and wrought-iron railings. In 1978 he acquired the Decauville locomotive Simonne, which he overhauled according to his own plans and calculations. He modified the rear wall of the driver's cab for better operability.

In order to be able to operate two locomotives at the same time on open days, the track was extended to about 800 meters. In 1990, he purchased a 4 m (13 ft) long caboose and baggage car and in 1992 a 6.2 kilometres (3.9 mi) long bulk freight car.

The historic rail vehicles attract public interest because they have been preserved, maintained and demonstrated at the Chemin de Fer du Val de Passey for more than 40 years Similar Decauville Progress locomotives are listed as historical monuments in France.

== Route ==
The 0.8 kilometres (0.5 mi) long narrow-gauge railway line leads from a 3-track locomotive shed and the adjacent 2-track coach remise along Rue du Val de Passey to the double-track station at the visitors' car park. From the station, the route follows a sloping track into and through the forest to the double-tracked terminal station where the line ends. The tracks have a weight per metre of 12 kg/m in the stations and 18 kg/m on the line in between.

The line through the forest crosses a small stream at two points. Due to the swampy subsoil 600 tons of gravel had to be brought-in as ballast. In 1990 electrically operated red-white square wave signals were installed.

== Rolling stock ==
=== Locomotives ===
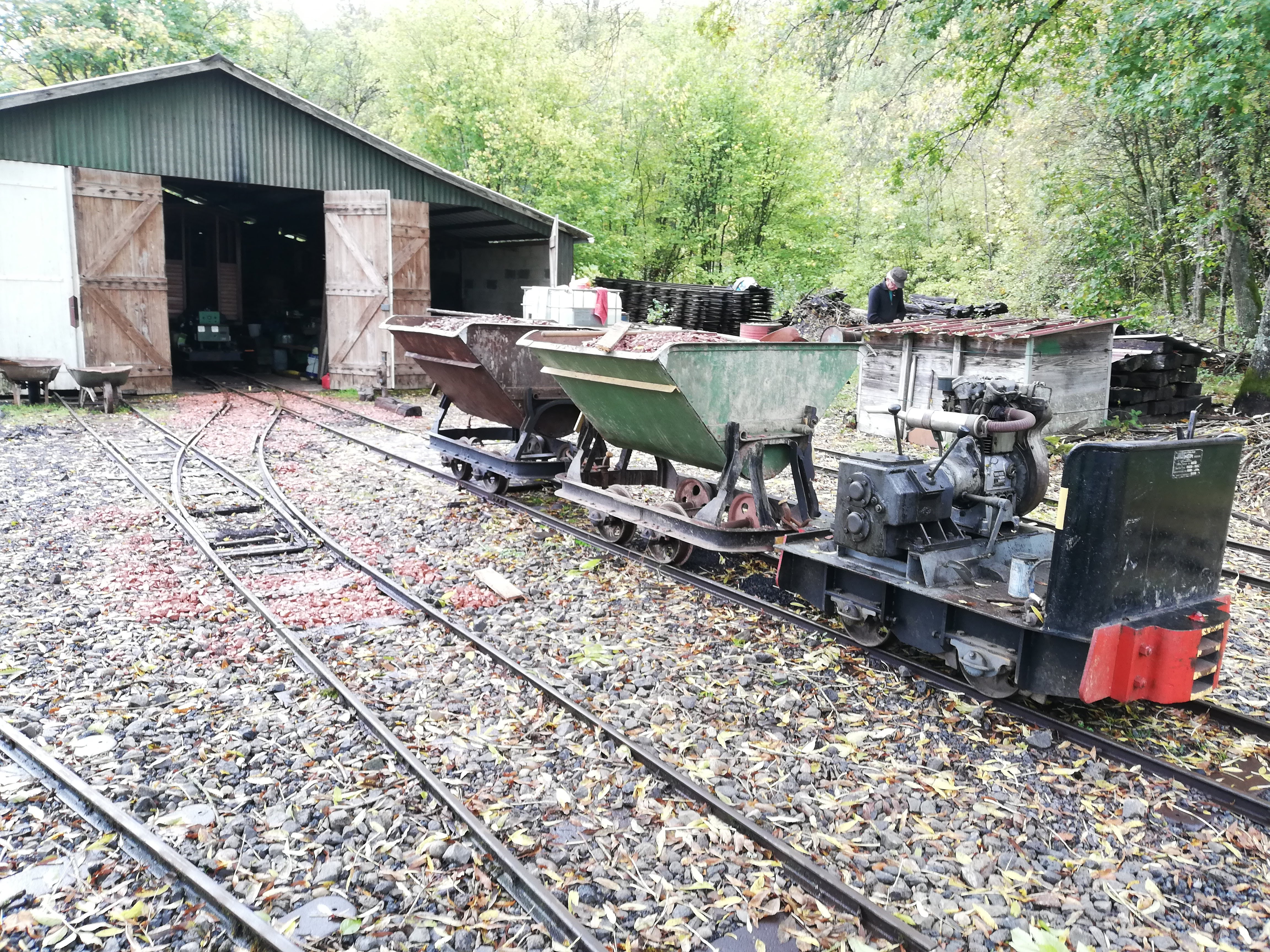
Heim 302/1952 Type Lilliput with Decauville V-skip wagons

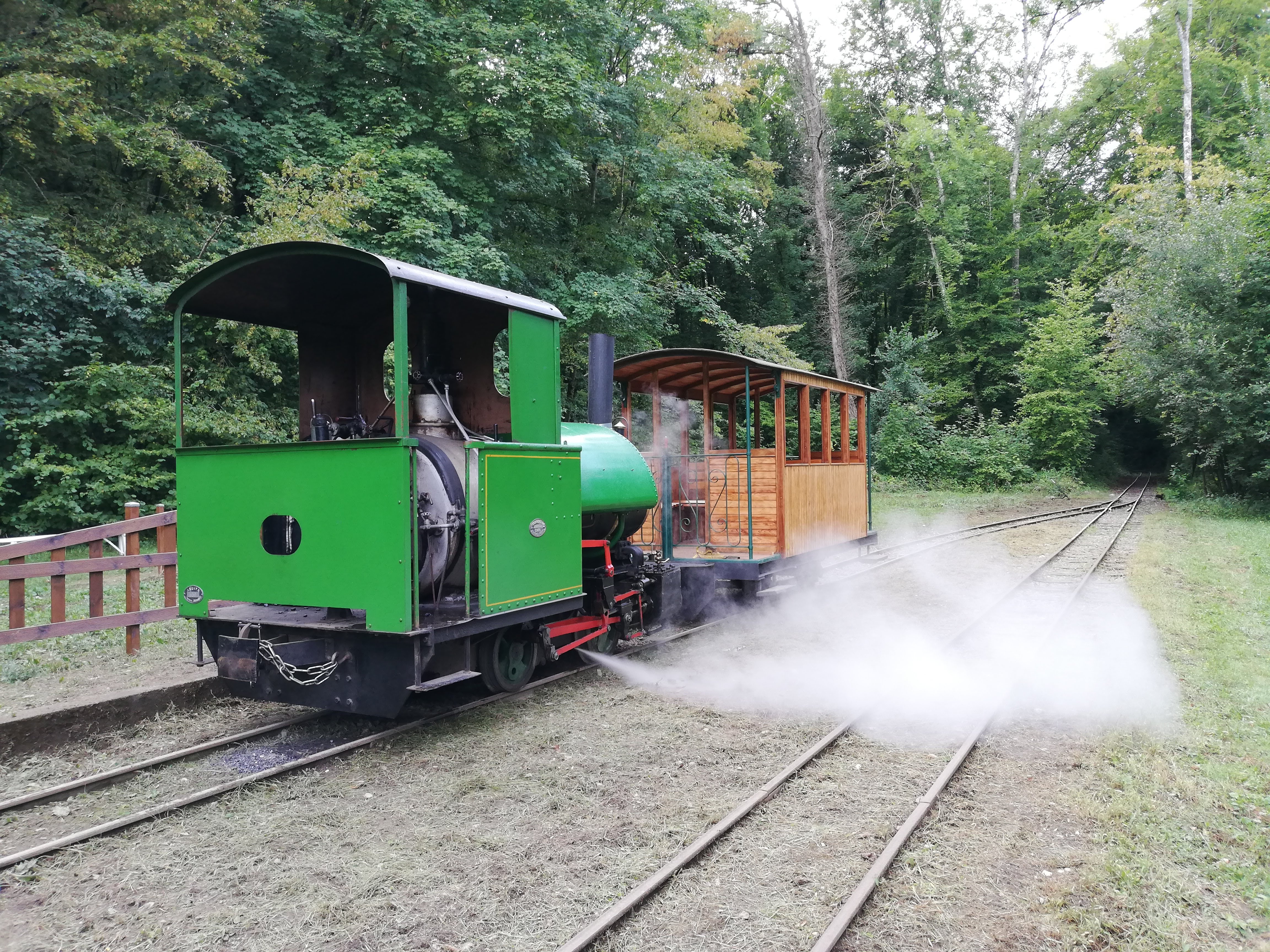
The Bagnall locomotive with the passenger wagon

The 10.5 tonne 0-6-0T Decauville locomotive Simonne was manufactured in 1916 by Établissements Decauville Ainé with the works number 1587. It differs from the other locomotives of the Progress type in that it does not have a flat rear wall of the cab, but an inclined one, which makes it easier to operate. It was used by the French army during the World War I and in the post-war period until June 1965 at the Toury sugar mill in Eure-et-Loir. From there it was sold to the owner of a château in Quinéville (Manche) called Touquet, who kept it in the open air in the château's garden. When Jaques Maginot bought it in 1978, it was in good condition but needed a new boiler, which Jaques Maginot rebuilt himself with the help of a professional boiler-maker. The locomotive was taken out of service after Whitsun 2013, as it needed new boiler tubes after 30 years of operation.

The 5.5 tonne 0-4-0ST saddle tank locomotive Charles was built by W.G. Bagnall in 1919 with the works number 2094. It is one of four locomotives (works numbers 2092-2095) built by Bagnall for Elias Wild & Son Ltd. They are identical in construction to Bagluey's locomotives Margaret and Mercedes. The locomotive was used by Ecausse d'Enghien in Belgium in the 1930s and was stored by an entrepreneur in Nivelles in 1966. It is probably the only operational Bagnall saddletank locomotive in continental Europe.

The 0.9 tonne Heim cabless locomotive of the Lilliput type with works number 302 of 1952 has an 8 hp Bernard W112 petrol combustion engine. It was the second or third locomotive of this type, and is oldest that is still preserved.

The 3 ton Gmeinder locomotive from 1938 has a 25 hp 2-cylinder Kaelble G 1102 combustion engine. It originates from a sand quarry near Sierck-les-Bains (Moselle) and was put back into service in 1989 by a member of the Foundation. However, it is rarely used because it is difficult to start by hand.

== Carriages ==
Most of the passenger and freight cars were built by Mr. Maginot himself:

- 1 two-axle passenger car A 11 (built 1975, 12 seats)
- 1 bogie car B 21 (year of construction 1972, 18 seats)
- 1 bogie wagon with benches C22 (built 1992)
- 1 two-axle luggage car DP 1 (year of construction 1990)
- 3 dump trucks
- 2 flat cars
- 2 freight cars for rail transport;
- 1 tank wagon for weed killing (400 litres);
- 1 power generator wagon for track work^{(status 2014)}
