= Rail Rebecq Rognon =

RRR
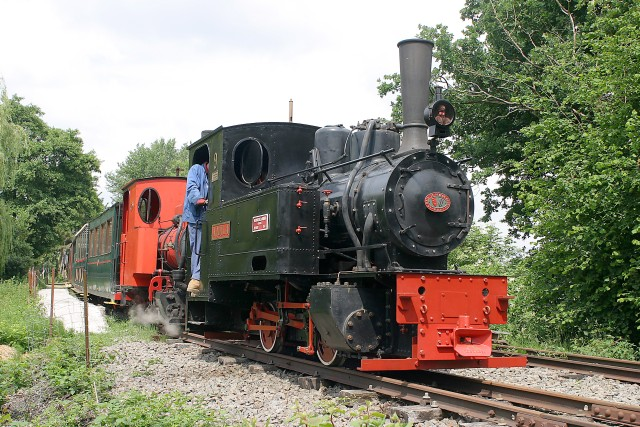
- Steam locomotives "Aquila" et "Arthur" on a 30th anniversary train
- Locale: Walloon Brabant
- Terminus: Rebecq - Rognon
- Coordinates: 50°39′39″N 4°08′03″E

Commercial operations
- Original gauge: 4 ft 8 1/2 in (1,435 mm)

Preserved operations
- Stations: 3
- Preserved gauge: 600 mm (1 ft 11 5/8 in)

Website
- http://www.rail-rebecq-rognon.eu

Rail Rebecq Rognon (RRR, also Petit Train Du Bonheur) is a heritage narrow gauge railway in Belgium.

== Establishment ==
In 1972, Erik Goegebeur purchased a 9-ton Orenstein & Koppel steam locomotive in response to an advert in a local newspaper. The locomotive was initially stored in the yard of Goegebeur's Kawasaki dealership, prior to a full overhaul and restoration to working order.

During 1973, Goegebeur bought the old signalman's house in Rognon, Bloc U, located at the junction of the old lines 115 (Braine-l'Alleud - Tubize - Rebecq - Braine-le-Comte) and 123 (Enghien - Braine-le-Comte). These lines were both dismantled, but their trackbeds, although overgrown by vegetation, were preserved.

With a working engine to use, the idea of running on the lines passing Goegebeur's house arose. The local authorities, represented by the Mayor Marcel Bartholomé and municipal secretary André Fagnard, and received a favorable and enthusiastic response.

The RRR reclaimed local tram track used by the line connecting Brussels to Leerbeek.

After several years of construction, the RRR was inaugurated in the spring of 1977.

== Route ==
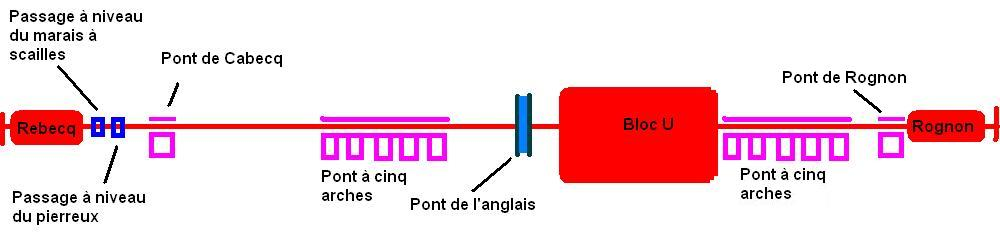

== Locomotives ==
=== Steam Locomotives ===
Original Railway	Number and name	Type or Class	Builder	Works Number	Built	Wheels	Notes	Image
	ARTHUR		Maffei	2842	1905	0-4-0WT		
	BIRLAND		O&K	11908	1928	0-4-0WT		

=== Diesel Locomotives ===
Original Railway	Number and name	Type or Class	Builder	Works Number	Built	Wheels	Notes	Image
Briqueterie de Ploegsteert	6001-6005		Moës			4wDM	(five locomotives were obtained originally)	
