= Adrian Goldsmith =

Australian World War II flying ace

Adrian Philip Goldsmith
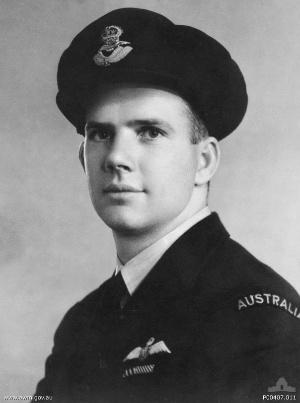
- Flight Lieutenant Adrian Goldsmith c. 1944
- Born: 25 April 1921; Waverley, New South Wales
- Died: 25 March 1961 (aged 39); Wahroonga, New South Wales
- Military career
- Allegiance: Australia
- Branch: Royal Australian Air Force
- Service years: 1940–1945
- Rank: Squadron Leader
- Nickname: Tim
- Conflicts: Second World War; European theatre; Siege of Malta; South West Pacific theatre
- Awards: Distinguished Flying Cross; Distinguished Flying Medal

Adrian Philip "Tim" Goldsmith, DFC, DFM (25 April 1921 – 25 March 1961) was an Australian flying ace of the Second World War. Officially credited with shooting down 16¼ enemy aircraft while serving with the Royal Australian Air Force, Goldsmith scored 12¼ of his victories during the Siege of Malta. His final four victories were achieved against Japanese aircraft while conducting operations over the South West Pacific.

== Early life ==
Goldsmith was born in the Sydney suburb of Waverley, New South Wales, on 25 April 1921 to Sidney Goldsmith, a timber merchant, and his English wife Philippa Mary (née Scott-Coward). Initially educated at Newington College, Goldsmith later attended Gosford High School following his family's move to Avoca Beach during the Great Depression. In 1937, aged 16, Goldsmith gained employment with the New South Wales Department of Works and Local Government as a clerk.

== Second World War ==
On 16 September 1940, Goldsmith enlisted in the Royal Australian Air Force for service during the Second World War. Accepted for pilot training, he graduated from his course and was posted to England in June 1941 with the rank of sergeant. During this time, he was briefly posted to No. 134 Squadron RAF and No. 242 Squadron RAF. On 10 December 1941, Goldsmith married Dorothea Rosemary Britton in a ceremony at Tuckingmill, Cornwall.

In February 1942, Goldsmith was posted to No. 126 Squadron RAF on Malta during a critical period in the Siege. Flying Hawker Hurricanes and Supermarine Spitfires during this time, Goldsmith managed to shoot down a Messerschmitt Bf 109 and damage another during an aerial engagement on 21 April; his own plane was damaged by a cannon shell fired by the third of four Bf 109s involved, partially jamming his ailerons. Within the first fortnight in May, Goldsmith had shot down a further six German and Italian aircraft and was subsequently recommended for the Distinguished Flying Medal. The announcement and accompanying citation for the award was published in a supplement to the London Gazette on 5 June 1942, reading:

Air Ministry, 5th June, 1942.

ROYAL AIR FORCE.

The KING has been graciously pleased to approve the following awards in recognition of gallantry displayed in flying operations against the enemy: —

Distinguished Flying Medal.

Aus.402500 Sergeant Adrian Philip GOLDSMITH, Royal Australian Air Force, No. 126 Squadron.

This pilot has destroyed at least 5 enemy aircraft. On one occasion he dived through a strong enemy fighter screen to destroy a bomber. When engaged by the fighters he shot one of them down.

Commissioned as a pilot officer in the Citizen Air Force on 15 May, with the service number 402500, Goldsmith conducted a sortie against an Axis shipping convoy approximately 130 miles (210 km) from his base on 15 June. During the engagement, Goldsmith attacked a large formation of aircraft and was confirmed as shooting down two aircraft—a CANT Z.506 and a Fiat BR.20—with a probable third (a Macchi C.200), within a space of ten minutes. For his efforts during this action, Goldsmith was awarded the Distinguished Flying Cross. The notification and citation for the award was published in a supplement to the London Gazette on 7 July 1942, reading:

Air Ministry, 7th July, 1942.

ROYAL AIR FORCE.

The KING has been graciously pleased to approve the following awards in recognition of gallantry displayed in flying operations against the enemy: —

Distinguished Flying Cross.

Pilot Officer Adrian Philip GOLDSMITH, D.F.M., (Aus.4O2500), Royal Australian Air Force, No. 126 Squadron.

This officer is a skilful and courageous pilot. In June, 1942, during an attack on a convoy 130 miles from his base, he shot down 2 enemy aircraft. Since being awarded the Distinguished Flying Medal, Pilot Officer Goldsmith has destroyed 6 enemy aircraft, bringing his victories to 11.

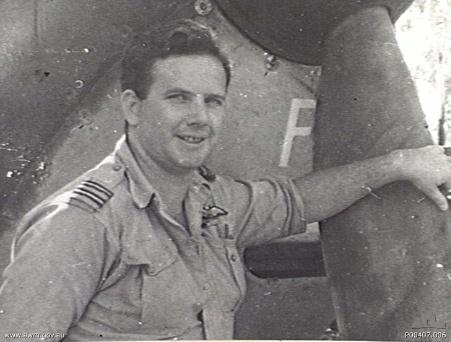
Flight Lieutenant Goldsmith c. 1944

By the end of his tour in July 1942, Goldsmith had amassed a tally of 12¼ aircraft shot down. Returning to England, he served as a flying instructor before proceeding home to Australia. He was promoted to flying officer on 15 November 1942. In January 1943, Goldsmith was posted as a flight commander to No. 452 Squadron RAAF, which was operating out of Batchelor, Northern Territory, in the defence of Darwin from Japanese air raids. The unit later relocated to Strauss, near Darwin, in February. On 2 May, Goldsmith was shot down and forced to bail out of his aircraft into the sea. After twenty-four hours in an inflatable dinghy, he was discovered and rescued.

Goldsmith was promoted to acting flight lieutenant in September 1943, by which time he had credited with shooting down four Japanese aircraft in aerial engagements. During 1943, Goldsmith's wife was reported as missing and presumed killed while on a voyage to Australia. In April 1944, he was posted to Mildura, Victoria, as a flying instructor. On 21 October 1944, Goldsmith attended an investiture ceremony at Government House, Sydney, where he was decorated with his Distinguished Flying Cross and Distinguished Flying Medal by the Governor of New South Wales. Two days later, he married Doris May McGrath, an Army nurse, at St Mary's Catholic Church, Concord, New South Wales. Promoted to acting squadron leader, Goldsmith was discharged from the Air Force on 31 May 1945 for medical reasons. By this time, he had been credited with an official tally of 16 aircraft shot down as well as a quarter shared victory, and a further three probables.

== Later life ==
Re-settling in Burwood, New South Wales, Goldsmith gained employment as a salesman. In 1946, he was employed by Commonwealth Oil Refineries Ltd and travelled around New South Wales with his work. He was later made State marketing-manager for the company, and returned to Sydney.

On 25 March 1961, aged 39, Goldsmith died of peritonitis at the Sydney Sanitarium and Hospital following an operation for ileo-caecal volvulus. Survived by his wife and son, a second son was born in October 1961. Goldsmith was cremated and his ashes were later scattered over the Timor Sea.
