= History of rail transport in France =

Travel poster for rail service from Paris to Rome via Lyon, 1920

Rail transport in France dates from the first French railway in 1827 to present-day enterprises such as the AGV.

== Beginnings ==
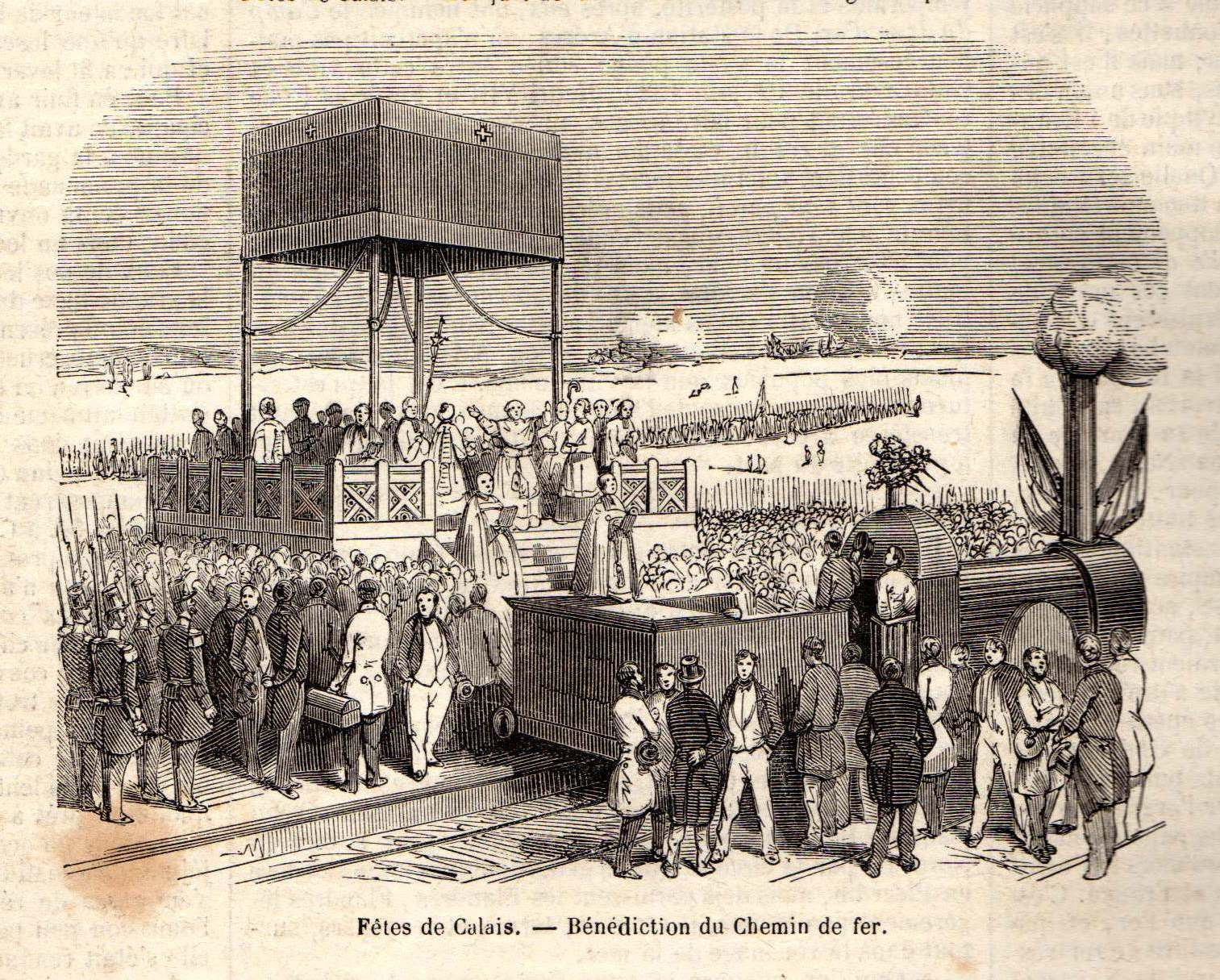
Catholic priests bless a railway engine in Calais, 1848.

France was slow in building railways, compared to Britain and in Belgium, which had already demonstrated their value by 1830. Urban land was expensive, as were iron and coal. A serious obstacle was powerful political opposition, especially as mobilized by the transport companies that used canals, roads, and rivers. They blocked the necessary railway charters in Parliament. Already in 1810, the French engineer fr:Pierre Michel Moisson-Desroches had proposed to build seven national railway lines from Paris, in order to travel "short distances within the Empire". However, nothing happened. Mining companies in 1828 opened the first railway to move coal from the fields around St. Etienne 11 miles (18 km) to the Loire River. Most of the work was done by horses, although steam locomotives were used for the last segment. Passenger service opened in 1835.

Between 1828 and 1833, the 57 km (35 mile) Saint-Étienne–Lyon railway was constructed. During the first few months of operation, horses pulled the trains; then steam locomotives were used.

The small French banking system was stretched to the limit in funding the early operations. The Péreire brothers were pioneers, but they discovered expenses were much higher than expected, especially maintenance costs. The government rejected all major rail projects before 1842, and France steadily fell behind the nations that had reached a quick consensus on railway policy. In 1842 Britain had 1,900 miles of railways in operation; France only 300.

The eventual relationship created between the French rail system and the government formed a compromise between two competing options:

1. the completely laissez-faire free-market system that had created Britain's elaborate rail network
2. a government-built and government-controlled railway, such as had grown up in Belgium.

France employed a mixture of these two models to construct its railways, but eventually turned definitively to the side of government control. The relationships between the government and private rail companies became complicated, with many conflicts and disagreements between the two groups.

== Government intervention ==
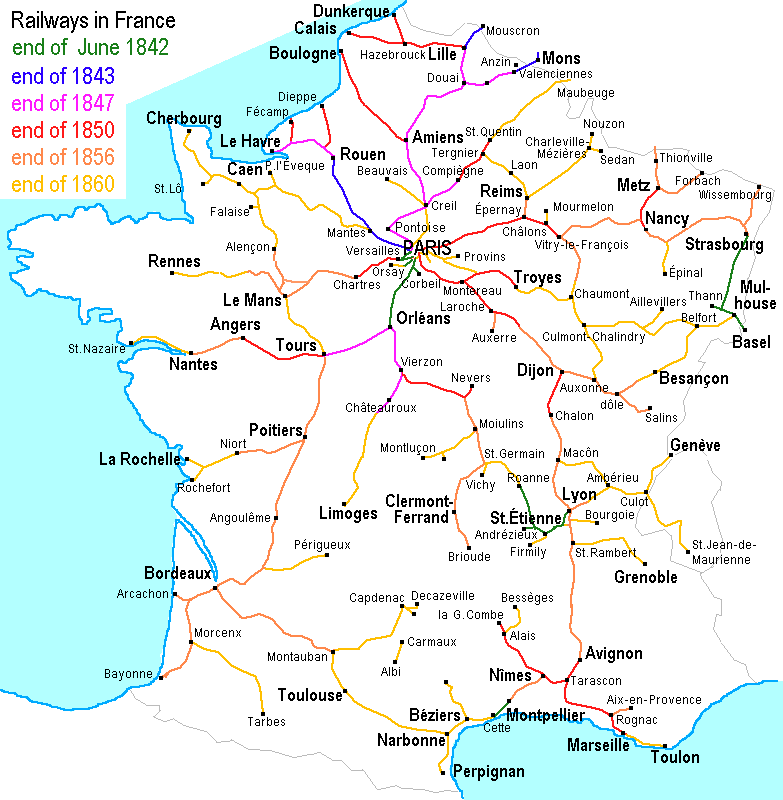
Development of the network up to 1860

The 1842 agreement was designed by Adolphe Thiers. The Thiers Plan, adopted in 1842, called for the state to contribute about $50,000 per mile and own the system. Private companies spend about $40,000 per mile for track, equipment, buildings, locomotives, and cars. The government further subsidized the companies by having the department of the Ponts et Chaussées do most of the planning and engineering work for new lines. The government would assist in securing the land, often by expropriation. The government also agreed to pay infrastructure costs, building bridges, tunnels, and track bed. The private companies would then furnish the tracks, stations and rolling stock, as well as pay the operating costs. The policy was confusing and contradictory, and blocked monopolies, which meant no regional networks could form.

This general policy masked many exceptions and additions. The most successful companies, especially the Chemins de fer du Nord, would often build their own lines themselves in order to avoid the complications of going through the government. For instance, during the economic boom period of the 1850s, the national government had to pay only 19 percent of the costs of railway construction. Other less successful lines, such as the Midi, would often need more assistance from the government to remain in operation. The same proved true during recessions, such as in 1859, when the railway lines gained a new agreement to save them from bankruptcy. In exchange for funding part of the construction of rail lines, the French government set maximum rates that the companies could charge. It also insisted that all government traffic must travel at a third of standard cost.

The expectation that the government would eventually nationalize the rail system formed another important element in French railway legislation. The original agreement of 1842 leased the railway lines to the companies for only 36 years. Napoleon III extended these leases to 99 years soon after he came to power. That the rail companies only operated on leases paved the way for the nationalization of the French rail lines under the socialist government of the 1930s.

When the Republic replaced the monarchy in 1848, 2000 miles (3200 km) of track were in operation, but the situation was highly unsatisfactory. Three dozen companies were in operation, most of them with incomplete lines that sharply limited traffic. Financially, most were in great distress. Moving passengers and freight from one plane to another was quite difficult, and many called for radical reforms; but no legislation was passed.

In 1838, the concession for the Strasbourg–Basel railway was granted to the Compagnie du chemin de fer de Strasbourg à Bâle, founded by the Koechlin brothers. The railway was opened in 1840–1844.

== Success under the Second Empire ==
When Napoleon III turned his presidency into an imperial role, he gained almost dictatorial powers and made completion of a good working system a high priority. The first step was to amalgamate all the companies along specific routes. The consolidation into six major companies proved successful. By 1857 the consolidation was complete, and the government was no longer operating any lines. All the trunk lines were interconnected. The original plan of using Paris as a hub was continued, so that long-distance travel from one place to another necessitated connecting to another line in Paris. Paris grew dramatically in terms of population, industry, finance, commercial activity, and tourism. The worldwide commercial crisis of 1857–58 delayed financing and construction for a brief while, but the financing for all six companies was solidified by government guarantees. The original vision from 1842 of a grant national network was largely realized. The system was virtually complete by 1870, although constant construction was done to upgrade the quality of lines, set up double trackage, rebuild bridges, Improve signaling, and large freight yards and passenger stations, reduce slopes and drill long tunnels.

=== National policy ===
The Second Empire under Napoleon III, 1852–1871, emphasized building infrastructure. Napoleon III placed great emphasis on economic growth and modernization, with special attention to infrastructure and construction of railways, as well as coal and iron establishments. He also stimulated French banking, completion of the telegraph system and subsidization of steamship lines. Railways were given priority over canals and local roads. The state built most of the railway system and invited private companies to operate the lines under leases of up to 99 years. They were publicly owned but privately operated. The state guaranteed the dividends of the railway operating companies, and in exchange took two-thirds of any greater profits. The financing involved stretched the private banking sector to its limit, and was greatly augmented by the introduction of the 300 franc bond, which enabled large numbers of middle-class Frenchmen to invest easily in the economic expansion.

When railways were begun France already operated well-established governmental structures and procedures that could easily expand to encompass railway regulations as well. The engineering bureaucracy was world-class. The agency that handled canals expanded to include railways. The Ponts et Chaussées, had very close control over the construction of roads, bridges, and canals in France; therefore, it was inevitable that the new railways would also fall under the government's close scrutiny. Other reasons also led the French government to control its railways closely. Unlike Britain or the United States, France as a European continental power had pressing military needs from its railways, needs which a private sector might not provide. The French government constructed long stretches of strategic railways in eastern France along the German border that served strategically crucial ends but lacked economic viability. "Pure" private economic interests would not have constructed these routes on their own, so France used government rewards and pressure to encourage the rail companies to build the needed lines. (The German and Russian Empires also had widespread strategic railway systems that purely commercial interests would not have built.)

By 1867 six large companies controlled networks comprising a total of 16,000 kilometers, and by 1871 the systems embraced over 23,000 kilometers. They were:

- Chemin de Fer de l'Est
- Chemin de Fer du Nord
- Chemins de fer de Paris à Lyon et à la Méditerranée
- Chemin de Fer Paris-Orléans
- Chemin de Fer du Midi

=== Leadership ===
The railway construction was such a grand project, and it showed in such dramatic effects in Great Britain, the leading financiers, industrialists, and technicians competed vigorously for the place, all under the Emperor's watchful eye. Key players included the brothers Isaac Pereire and Emile Pereire, Auguste de Morny, Paulin Talabot, and—richest of them all—James de Rothschild. In the battle for control of a line from Paris to the Mediterranean, Talabot, with Rothschild support, won, besting the Pereire brothers. In 1853, Morny floated the idea of a Grand Central Railroad. By 1857 it became the scheme for six major monopolistic networks in six regions: North (Nord), East (Est), West (Ouest), PLM, Orleans, and Southern (Midi). The Government gave 99-year leases, and gave continuing subsidies, and return for heavily subsidized or free government movements. The six were required to build feeder networks locally.

=== Railways in operation ===
The first completed lines radiated out of Paris, connecting France's major cities to the capital. These lines still form the backbone of the French railway system. By the 1860s, workers had completed the basic structure of the network, but they continued to build many minor lines during the late 19th century to fill in the gaps.

By 1855, the many original small firms had coalesced into six large companies, each having a regional monopoly in one area of France. The Nord, Est, Ouest, Paris-Orléans, Paris-Lyon-Méditerranée (PLM), and the Midi lines divided the nation into strict corridors of control. Difficulties arose in that the six large monopolies, with the exception of the Midi Company, all connected to Paris, but did not link together anywhere else in the country. The French railway map comprised a series of unconnected branches running out of Paris. While this meant that trains served Paris well, other parts of the country were not served as well. For instance, one branch of the Paris-Orléans Line ended in Clermont-Ferrand, while Lyon stood on the PLM Line. Thus any goods or passengers requiring transportation from Lyon to Clermont-Ferrand in 1860 needed to take a circuitous route via Paris of over seven hundred kilometers, even though a mere hundred and twenty kilometers separated the two cities.

This centering on Paris led to inefficiency in the Franco-Prussian War (1870–1871). The Prusso-German railway lines, inter-connected in a grid-like fashion, proved far more efficient at advancing troops and supplies to the front than the French one. The arrangement of the lines also hurt France's economy. Shipping costs between regional centers became greatly inflated. Thus many cities specialized in exporting their goods to Paris, as trans-shipment to a second city would double the price. France lagged behind German building following the unification of Germany in 1871. France ended up with this arrangement for a number of reasons. Paris formed the undisputed capital of France, and many viewed it as the capital of Europe. To French railway planners, it seemed only natural that all the lines should involve the metropolis. By contrast, Germany ended up with a far superior system because it had little unity and many centers vying for preeminence. Thus a variety of rail centers arose. Berlin, Munich, Dresden, Hamburg, and the Rhine areas all had links to each other. By 1900, German preeminence was obvious and factored into the growing hostility toward Germany in France.

By 1914 the French railway system had become one of the densest and most highly developed in the world, and had reached its maximum extent of around 60,000 km (37,000 mi). About one-third of this mileage comprised narrow-gauge lines.

Following 1918, France received significant additions to its locomotive and wagon fleet as part of the reparations from Germany required by the Versailles Treaty. In addition, the network of the Imperial Railways in Alsace-Lorraine was taken over by France when the Alsace-Lorraine region, which had been under German control since the Franco-Prussian War, was returned to France.

=== Rates decline and tonnage increases ===
Railway freight rates fell steadily from 14.5 (centimes per ton-kilometer 0 and 1841–1844, 28.7 and 1855–1864, then slowly 25.4 in 1905–1913. Meanwhile, freight rates on the roads held steady at about 25. The rapid pace of industrialization in the growth of national markets dramatically increased the tonnage carried. In 1845, the railways carried 102 million ton-kilometers; by 1850, the total had quadrupled to 423 million. By 1855 it reached 1,530 million, in 1860, 3,140 million.

== Nationalisation ==
By the 1930s, competition from motor vehicles took its toll on the railways, and the rail network needed pruning. The narrow-gauge lines suffered most severely from road competition; many thousands of miles of narrow-gauge lines closed during the 1930s. By the 1950s the once extensive narrow-gauge system had practically become extinct. Many minor standard gauge lines also closed. The French railway system today has around 40,000 km (25,000 mi) of track.

Many of the private railway operating companies began to face financial difficulties. In 1938 the socialist government fully nationalised the railway system and formed the Société Nationale des Chemins de fer Francais (SNCF). Regional authorities have begun to specify schedules since the mid of the 1970s with general conventions between the regions and the SNCF since the mid-1980s.

From 1981 onwards, a newly constructed set of high-speed TGV (Train à Grande Vitesse) lines linked France's most populated areas with the capital, starting with Paris-Lyon. In 1994, the Channel Tunnel opened, connecting France and Great Britain by rail under the English Channel.

== See also ==
- Narrow-gauge railways in France
- Rail transport in France
- Transportation in France
- Chemin de Fer de la Baie de Somme
- Imperial Railways in Alsace-Lorraine
- History of rail transport worldwide
