= Barthélemy Thimonnier =

French inventor of an early sewing machine

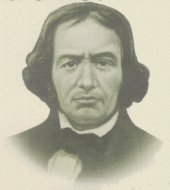
- Born: 19 August 1793; L'Arbresle, Rhône
- Died: 5 July 1857 (aged 63); Amplepuis

Thimonniers Stitch – a chain stitch formed with a barbed needle

Barthélemy Thimonnier (19 August 1793 in L'Arbresle, Rhône - 5 July 1857 in Amplepuis) was a French inventor, who is attributed with the invention of the first sewing machine that replicated sewing by hand. He was born in L'Arbresle, in Rhône in France.

== Early life ==
In 1795, his family moved to Amplepuis. Thimonnier was the eldest of seven children. He studied for a while in Lyon, before going to work as a tailor in Panissières. Barthelemy Thimonnier married an embroideress in January 1822. In 1823, he settled in a suburb of Saint-Étienne and worked as a tailor there.

== Invention of the sewing machine ==
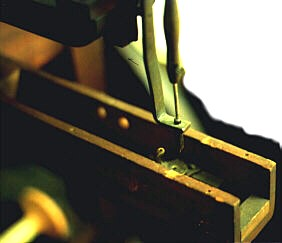
Close up of a copy of Barthélemy Thimonnier's sewing machine from about 1830

Though the first sewing machine needle was patented by Charles Fredrick Wiesenthal in 1755, in 1829 Thimonnier reinvented the sewing machine. In 1830 he signed a contract with Auguste Ferrand, a mining engineer, who made the requisite drawings and submitted a patent application. The patent for his machine was issued to them on 17 July 1830 in the names of both men, supported by the French government. One important early investor of Barthélemy Thimonnier was Louis-Antoine Beaunier of the Saint-Étienne miners' school.

The earliest sewing machine was actually patented by Thomas Saint in 1790, so Thimonnier's machine was not the first. Saint's contribution was not made public until 1874 when William Newton Wilson, himself a sewing machine manufacturer, found the drawings in the London Patent Office and built a machine which worked following some adjustments to the looper. So, in 1790 Thomas Saint had invented a machine with an overhanging arm, a feed mechanism (adequate for the short lengths of leather he intended it for), a vertical needle bar and a looper. The London Science Museum has the model that Wilson built from Saint's drawings.

== Sewing machine riot ==
The same year, he opened (with partners) the first machine-based clothing manufacturing company in the world. It was supposed to create army uniforms. A workshop was established in the rue de Sèvres in Paris with around 80 sewing machines in total.

However in 1831, 150–200 tailors confronted them at the factory destroying dozens of machines in the process, reportedly fearful of losing work and lower wages following the issuing of the patent.

According to Moniteur,

A group of tailors, numbering about 150, headed this afternoon to rue de Sèvres, n° 155, towards the home of Mr. Gombert, into which they violently entered with the intention of breaking the sewing machines for military clothing. Informed of their project, M. Perrasset, standard-bearer in the battalion of the 10th legion of the national guard, immediately warned the police commissioner and M. Pascal, chief of the same battalion. Immediately a detachment of the 8th light, commanded by Lieutenant Pirolle, and passing rue de Sèvres, intervened at the requisition of the head of the establishment; their appearance put some of the delinquents to flight, they confined the other in the house from which they only came out between two hedges formed by the line and the National Guards who had come running from the quarter; 75 of these workers were thus taken to the police headquarters where they are imprisoned. They were immediately interrogated and the culprits will be placed in the hands of the king's attorney.

— Moniteur, 20 January 1831
(Translation; French)

It is unclear whether "Gombert" is mistakenly referring to Barthélemy Thimonnier or referring to one of his partners, funders or employees.

A month later the Gazette des Tribunaux (The Court Gazette) refers to it as the house of "Mr. Petit". This is referring to Maison Germain Petit & Cie, the company established by Barthélemy Thimonnier & Auguste Ferrand.

They also claim mechanic destruction was prevented by the National Guard and are highly critical towards the attempts. The Court Gazette, a criminal justice magazine, often directly sourced from governmental accounts. Given the high level of political resistance at the time (see Canut revolts) it could be unlikely that any success of the destruction would be stated publicly by governmental sources for fear of inspiring further actions.

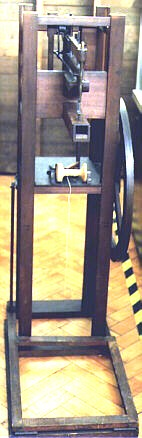
A copy of Barthélemy Thimonnier's sewing machine from about 1830

The statement went on to note the following,

They appeared today before the 6th correctional chamber. These seventy-five defendants cluttered the courtroom … Questioned by the President on the reasons for their irruption at Mr. Petit's, each of the seventy-five defendants rising in turn, and with a German, Provençal, Gascon, Norman accent, etc., answered: it was to see the machine, out of curiosity; always the same answer …. M. Ferdinand Barrot, in an indictment full of wisdom and of moderation … demonstrated to them, by means of statistics made available to them, that the invention of mechanics was favorable to industry, and consequently to industrialists.

— Gazette des Tribunaux, 23 February 1831
(Translation; French)

According to a later source,

Five defendants were sentenced to one month's imprisonment and sixty-nine to eight days' imprisonment; the seventy-fifth, whose name was Jacob, was acquitted.

— Le Travail National, 1909
(Translation; French)

Thimonnier retired from the company the same year, shortly following the riot. The entire company was then fully dissolved a few years later, following the death of principal investor, Mr.Beaunier of The Saint-Étienne miners' school.

A model of the machine is exhibited at the London Science Museum. The machine is made of wood and uses a barbed needle which passes downward through the cloth to grab the thread and pull it up to form a loop to be locked by the next loop.

== Later life ==
Thimonnier then returned to Amplepuis and supported himself as a tailor again, while searching for improvements to his machine. He obtained new patents in 1841, 1845, and 1847 for new models of sewing machine. However, despite having won prizes at World Fairs, and being praised by the press, use of the machine did not spread. Thimonnier's financial situation remained difficult, and he died in poverty at the age of 63. The Thimonnier sewing machine company, created after his death, existed up to the 20th century.
