= Rail transport in France =

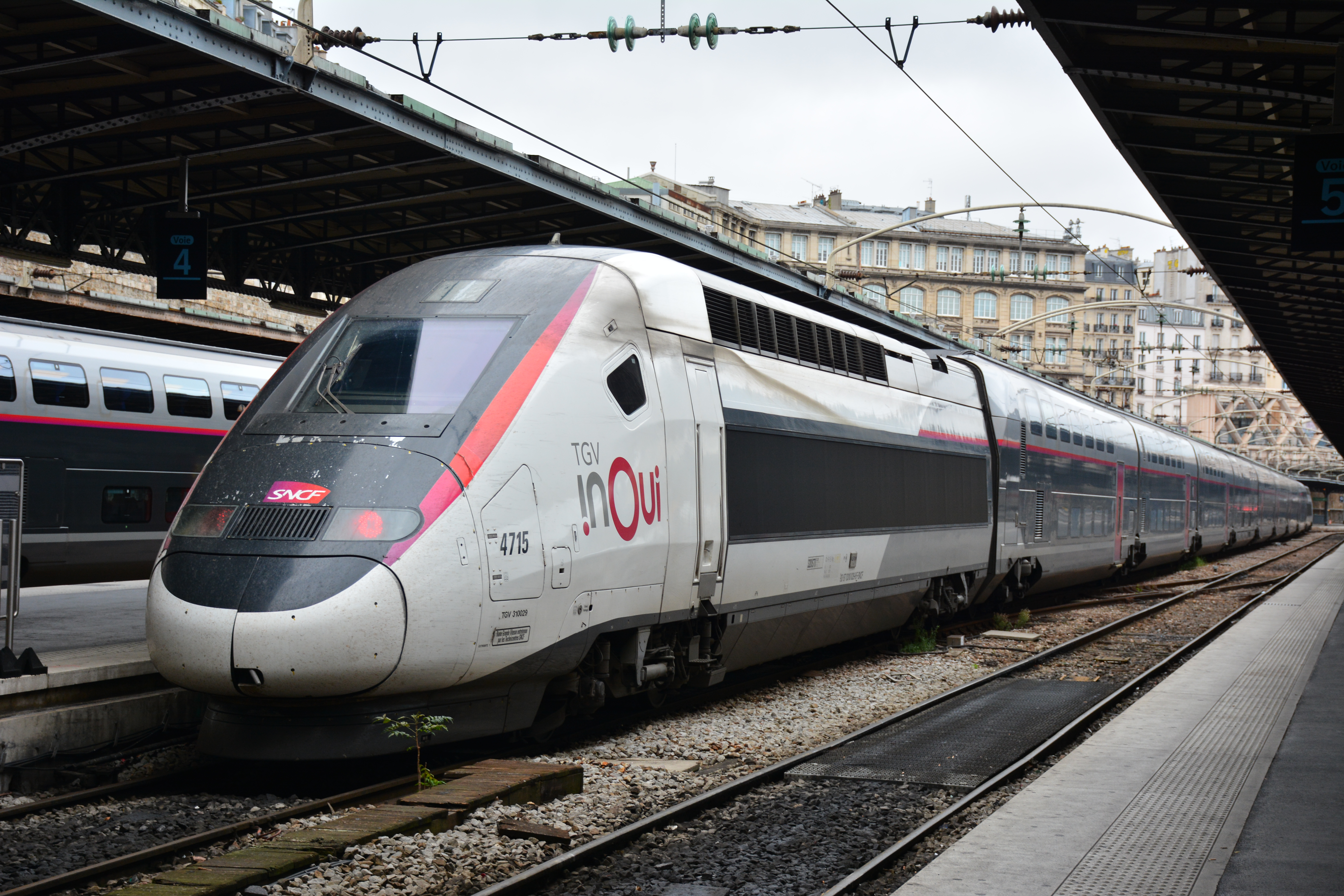
- TGV at Gare de l'Est in Paris.

Operation
- National railway: SNCF
- Infrastructure company: SNCF Réseau
- Major operators: Thalys, TGV Lyria, Eurostar, RATP, Elipsos, ECR

Statistics
- Ridership: 1.762 billion (2017, SNCF and RATP sections of RER)
- Passenger-distance: 100.2 billion (2017)
- Freight: 33.6 billion tonne-km (2017, SNCF and competitors)

System length
- Total: 29,901 kilometres (18,580 mi)
- Double track: 16,445 km (10,218 mi)
- Electrified: 15,140 km (9,410 mi)
- High-speed: 2,734 km (1,699 mi) (dedicated); 929 km (577 mi) (upgraded)

Track gauge
- Main: 1,435 mm (4 ft 8 1/2 in) standard gauge
- High-speed: 1,435 mm (4 ft 8 1/2 in)

Electrification
- 25 kV AC: 9,113 km (5,663 mi)
- 1.5 kV DC: 5,905 km (3,669 mi)
- other: 122 km (76 mi)

Features
- No. of tunnels: 1,300
- Tunnel length: 540 km (340 mi)
- Longest tunnel: 50.5 km (31.4 mi) (Channel Tunnel)
- Longest bridge: 2.178 km (1.353 mi) (Saint-André-de-Cubzac bridge)
- No. of stations: 3,054 (2009).
- Max elevation: Refuge-du-Nid-d'Aigle station at 2,412 metres (7,913 ft)
Map

Rail transport in France is marked by a clear predominance of passenger traffic, driven in particular by high-speed rail. The SNCF, the national state-owned railway company, operates most of the passenger and freight services on the national network managed by its subsidiary SNCF Réseau. With a total of 29,901 kilometres (18,580 mi) of railway, France operated the second-largest European railway network in 2007. As of 2021, it was among the ten longest railway networks in the world.

The first railway line in the country opened in 1827 from Saint-Étienne to Andrézieux. The network has undergone a major modernization since 1981 with the arrival of the TGV high-speed rail service which has been consistently expanded in subsequent years.

In 2017, there were 1.762 billion journeys on the French national rail network, among which 1.270 billion on SNCF services and 493 million on RATP sections of the RER, the express regional network operating in the Paris area which is shared between both companies. The Paris suburban rail services represents alone 82% of the French rail annual ridership.

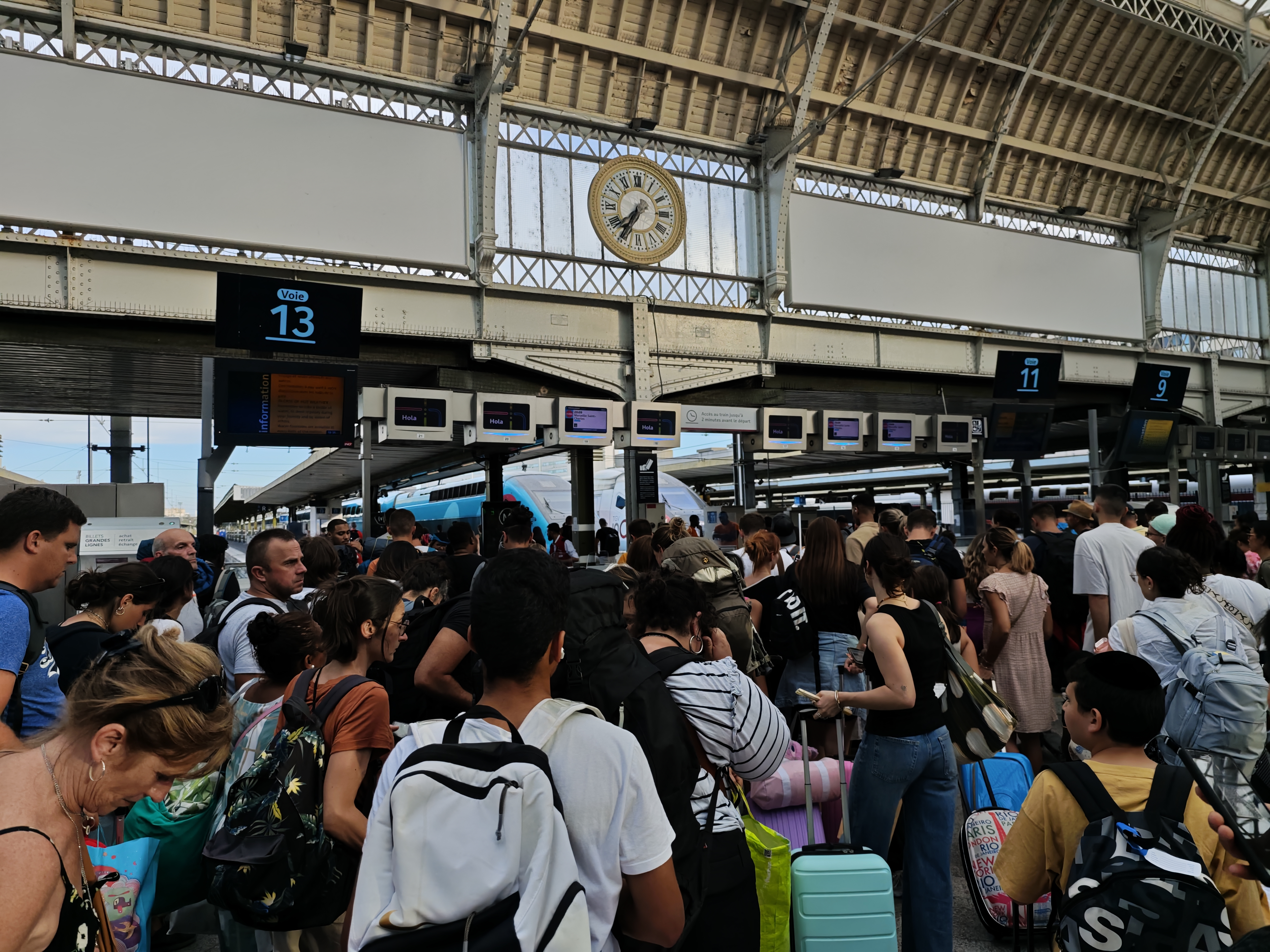
Passengers on platform while boarding a high-speed train at Gare de Lyon, Paris

With a total of 100.2 billion passenger-kilometres, France has the fifth-most used passenger network worldwide, and second-most used in Europe after that of Russia.

France is a member of the International Union of Railways (UIC). The UIC country code for France is 87.

At the same time, only 9% of French cargo is shipped via railway, or about ½ of the European average, and only a small fraction when compared to certain countries.

National and regional services (TER) are complemented by an important network of urban railways which is still rapidly growing. Six cities are served by metro systems (Lille, Lyon, Marseille, Paris, Rennes and Toulouse), while 31 metropolitan areas are additionally served by tram networks, among which 23 were inaugurated in the 21st century.

France was ranked 7th among national European rail systems in the 2017 European Railway Performance Index for intensity of use, quality of service and safety performance, a decrease from previous years.

== History ==
In 1814, the French engineer Pierre Michel Moisson-Desroches proposed to the Emperor Napoleon to build seven national railways from Paris, in order to travel "short distances within the Empire".

However, the history of railways in France really begins in 1827, when the first trains operated on the Saint-Etienne to Andrezieux Railway, the first French line, granted by order of King Louis XVIII in 1823.

== Operation ==
Since Legrand Star rail plan of 1842, French railways are highly focused on Paris.

Traffic is concentrated on the main lines: 78% of activity is done on 30% of the network (8,900 km / 5,500 mi), and the 46% of smaller lines (13,600 km / 8,500 mi) only drive 6% of the traffic. The 366 largest stations (12%) account for 85% of passenger activity, and the smallest 56% of stations take only 1.7% of traffic.

=== Freight transport ===
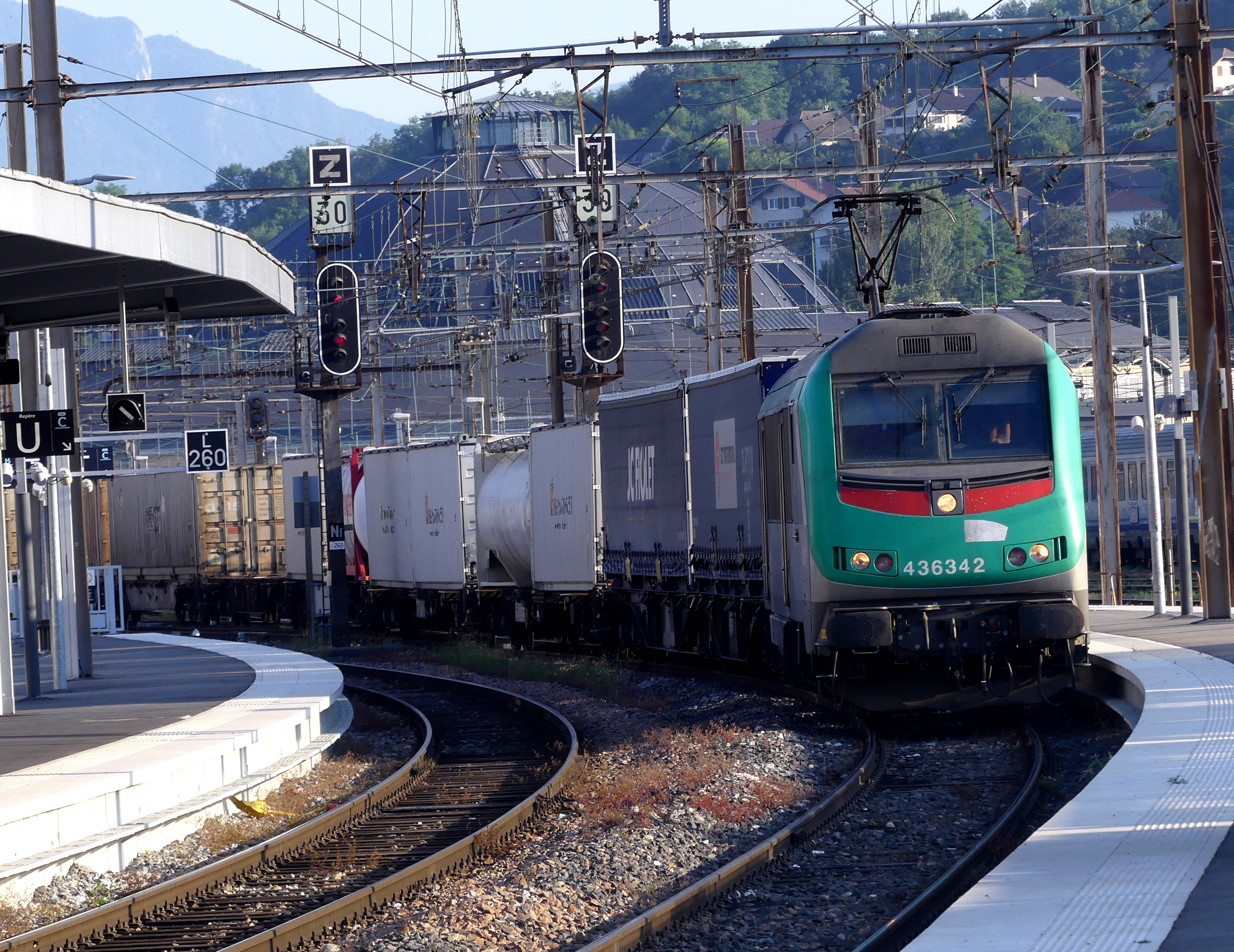
Freight train hauled by a BB 36000 passing through Chambéry station.

Freight transport has declined since the early 1980s. Today the network is predominantly passenger-centric; railways transport only 9% of French cargo, or about 1/2 of the European average, and less than a fourth of the US railways' share of US cargo.

Since 1 January 2007, the freight market has been open to conform to European Union (EU) agreements (EU Directive 91/440). New operators had already reached 15% of the market at the end of 2008.

=== Passenger transport ===
==== Short and middle distance ====
The Transport express régional (TER) is directed by the administrative Regions of France. They contract with the SNCF for lines exploitation. Regional rail on the island of Corsica is operated by Chemins de fer de la Corse. Rapid transit is known as Réseau Express Régional (RER), present in Paris (Réseau Express Régional) and planned for Lyon (Réseau Express de l'Aire urbaine Lyonnaise). Commuter rail systems cenetred around the Swiss cities of Geneva (Léman Express) and Basel (Basel S-Bahn), in the Swiss canton of Jura (RER Jura), and in the Ortenau region of Germany (Ortenau Regional S-Bahn) also serve nearby towns in France. Several TER lines also connect to railway stations in neighbouring countries.

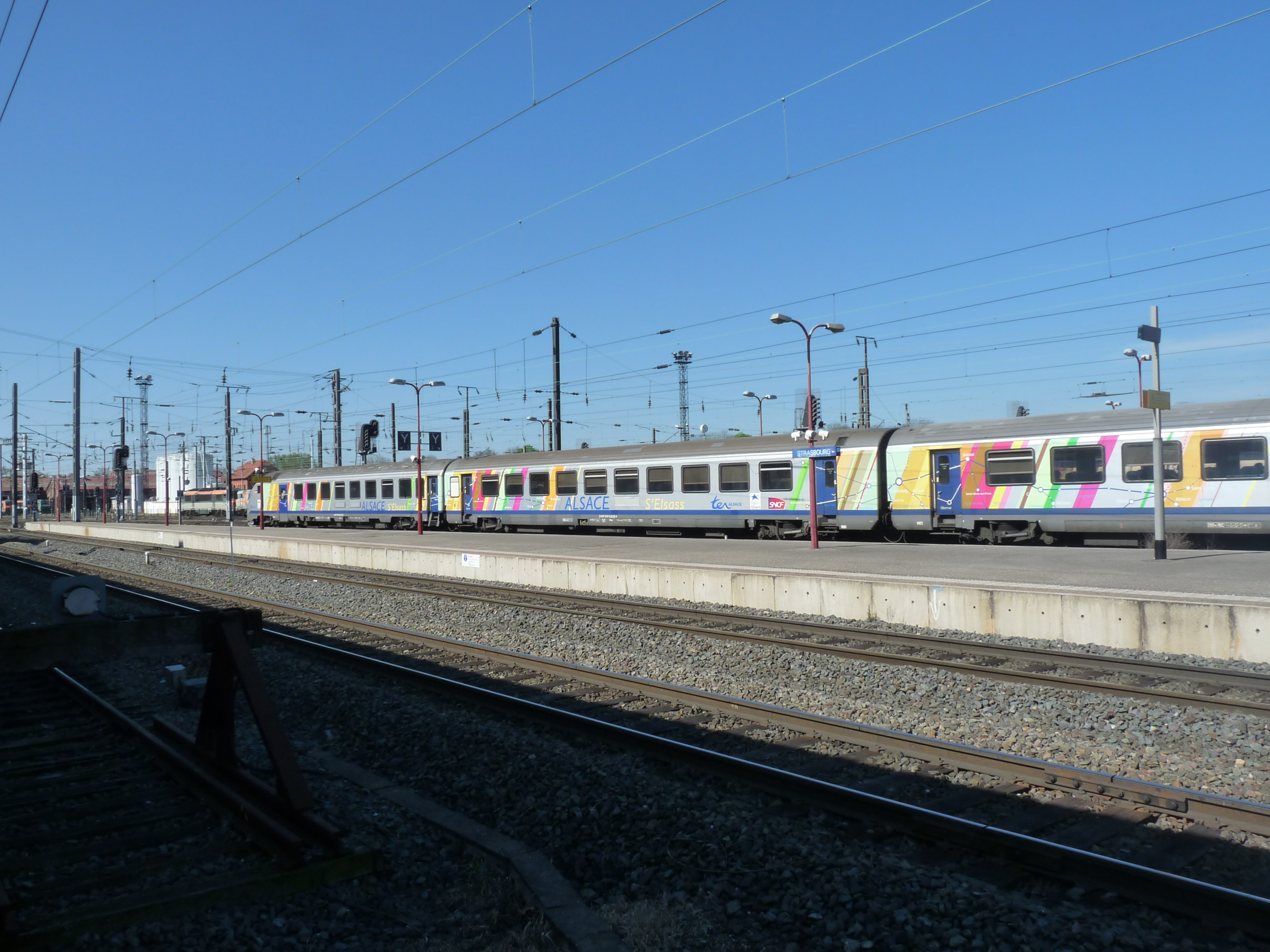
French regional train in Strasbourg

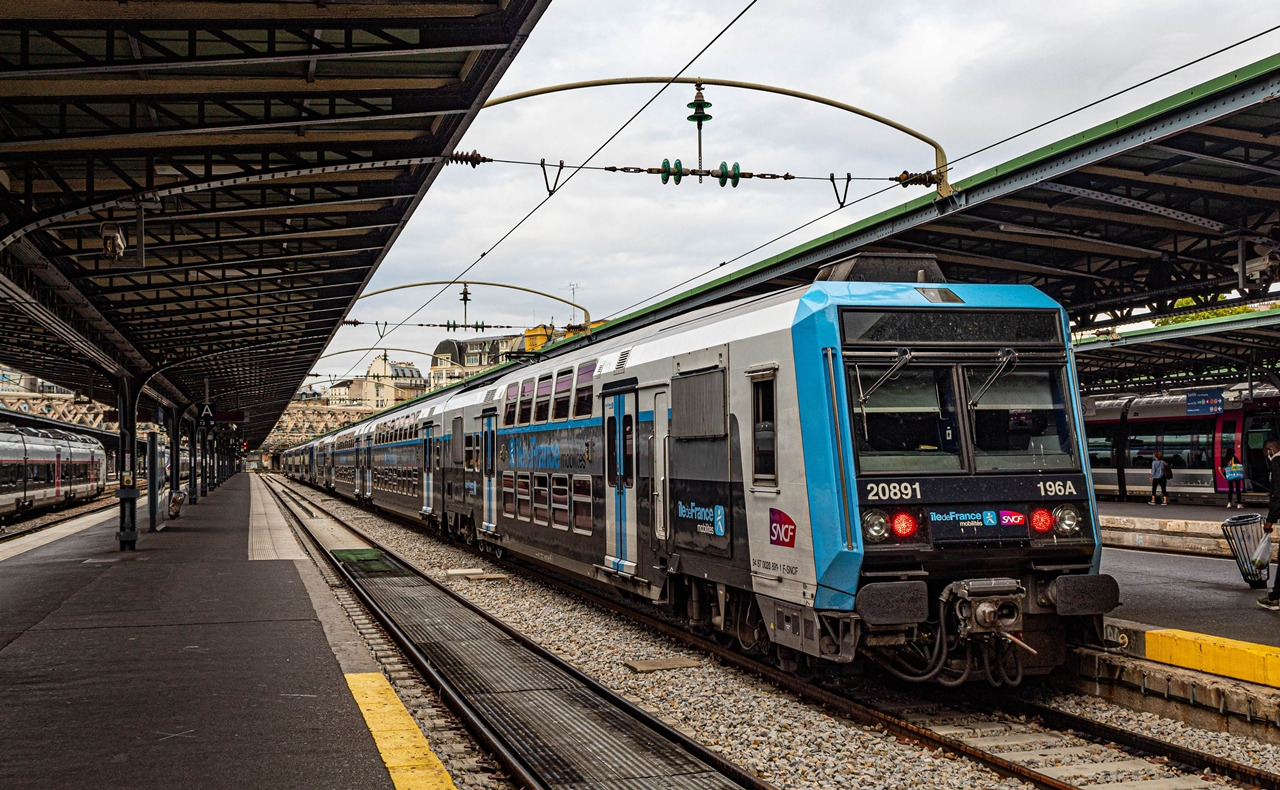
Regional train at Gare de l'Est, Paris

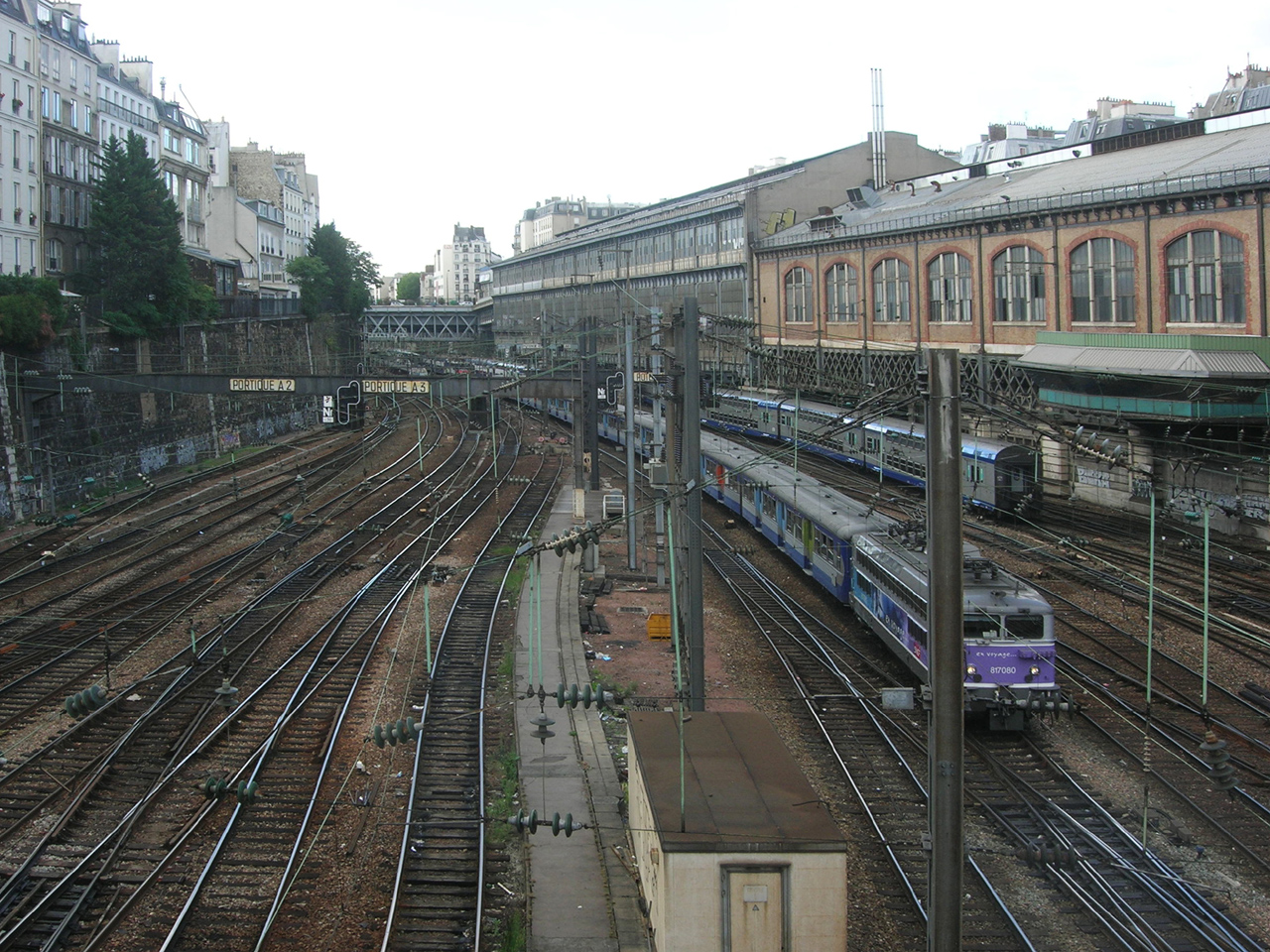
Gare Saint Lazare, Paris

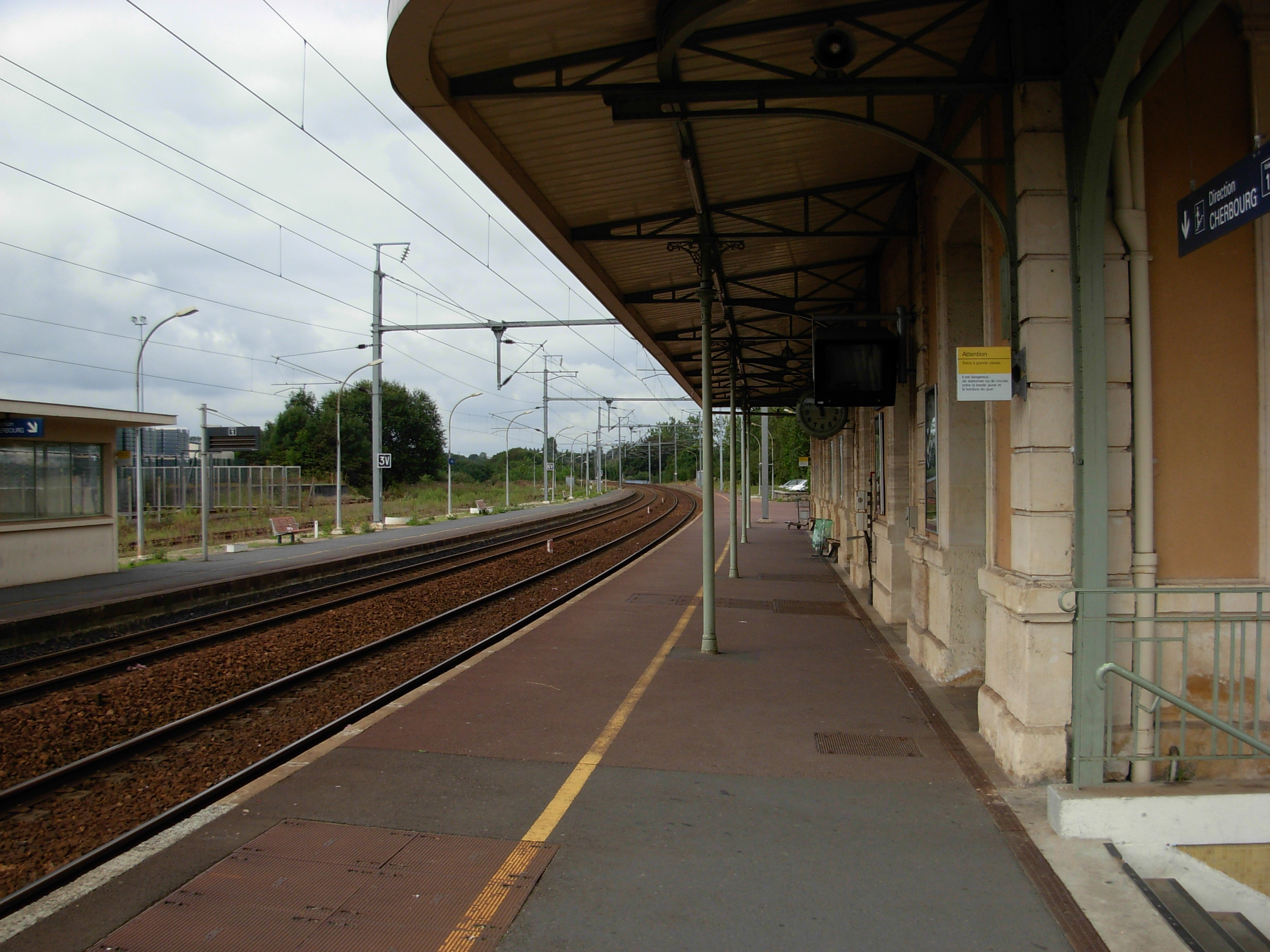
Bayeux station in the Normandy region

==== Long distance ====
The SNCF directly manage this class of trains. The TGV (including TGV inOui and Ouigo) is used on the most important destinations, both national and international, while Intercités carriages are still used for other lines (Intercités de Nuit for nighttime services). Cross-border services are operated by TGV Lyria to Switzerland, EuroStar to Belgium, Germany, Luxembourg, the Netherlands and the United Kingdom, AVE to Spain, and Trenitalia France to Italy.

== Network ==
The French railway network, as administered by SNCF Réseau, as of June 2007, is a network of 29,213 kilometres (18,152 mi) of commercially usable lines, of which 15,141 km (9,408 mi) is electrified. 1,876 km (1,166 mi) of those are high speed lines (LGV), 16,445 km (10,218 mi) have two or more tracks. 5,905 km (3,669 mi) are supplied with 1,500 V DC, 9,113 km (5,663 mi) with 25 kV AC at 50 Hz. 122 km (76 mi) are electrified by third rail or other means.

1,500 V is used in the south; HSR lines and the northern part of the country use 25 kV electrification.

Trains drive on the left, except in Alsace and Moselle where tracks were first constructed while those regions were part of Germany.

=== Rail links to adjacent countries ===
- Same gauge
  - Belgium — voltage change 25 kV AC/3 kV DC (except high-speed line to Brussels, same voltage)
  - Germany — voltage change 25 kV AC/15 kV AC
  - Italy — voltage change 25 kV AC or 1.5 kV DC/3 kV DC
  - Luxembourg — same voltage
  - Monaco — same voltage
  - Spain via the LGV Perpignan-Figueres — same voltage
  - Switzerland — voltage change 25 kV AC or 1.5 kV DC/15 kV AC
  - United Kingdom via the Channel Tunnel — voltage change 25 kV AC/750 V DC third rail (except high-speed line to London, same voltage)
- Break-of-gauge, 1,435 mm (4 ft 8 1/2 in)/1,668 mm (5 ft 5 21/32 in)
  - Spain (on conventional tracks) — voltage change 1.5 kV DC/3 kV DC
- Andorra — No rail link to France
- No rail links from Saint Martin to Sint Maarten or from French Guiana to Suriname or Brazil

== Current status ==
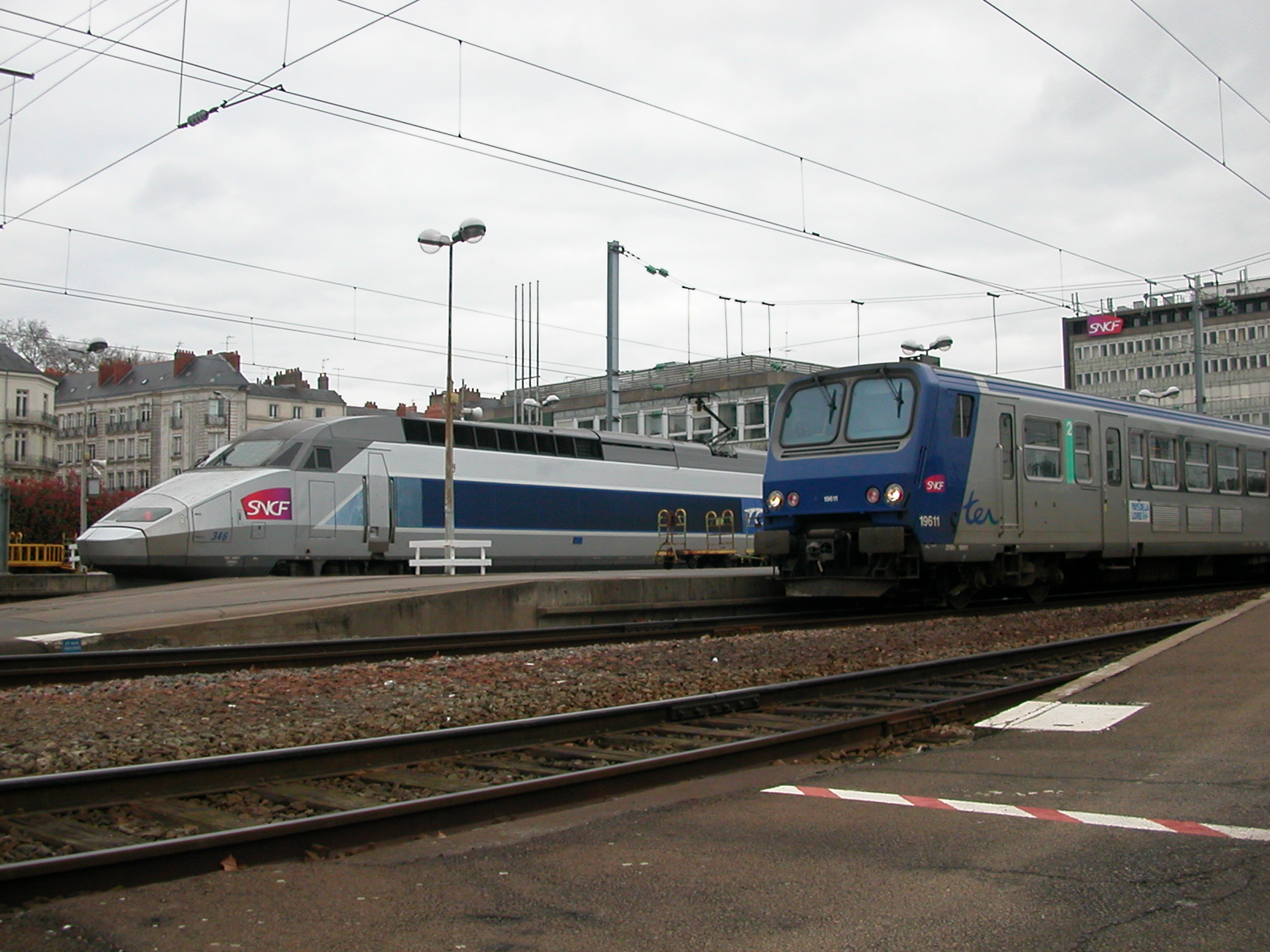
TGV and regional train in Nantes station

The French non-TGV intercity service (TET) is in decline, with old infrastructure and trains. The French government is planning to remove the monopoly that rail currently has on long-distance journeys by letting coach operators compete.

Travel to the UK through the Channel Tunnel has grown in recent years, and from May 2015 passengers have been able to travel direct to Marseille, Avignon and Lyon. Eurostar is also introducing new Class 374 trains and refurbishing the current Class 373s.

The International Transport Forum described the current status of the French railways in their paper "Efficiency indicators of Railways in France":

- The success of the TGV is undeniable (Crozet 2013). Work started in September 1975 on the first high-speed rail (HSR) line, between Paris and Lyon, and it was inaugurated in September 1981. New high-speed lines were opened in 1989 (towards the south-west), in 1993 (towards the north), etc. The high-speed network extent was 2,600 km in 2017, after the opening of four new lines.
- The regionalisation of intercity and local services was tested in 1997 and fully deployed in the early 2000s. Since then, TERs (regional express trains) have seen traffic rise steeply (50% between 2000 and 2013) as, to a lesser extent, have services in the Ile de France region (25%).
- Rail freight has been far less successful. The French network carried 55 billion tonne-km in 2001, but this figure scarcely reached 32 billion tonne-km in 2013. This weak performance contrasts sharply with the ambitious public policy of the last fifteen years. The Grenelle Environment Forum (2007–2010) oversaw the deployment of a costly freight plan that was no more effective than its predecessors.

== Funding ==
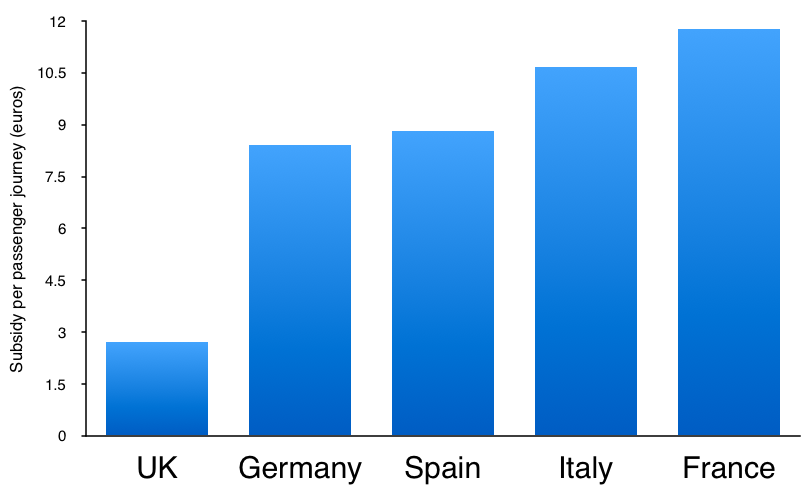
Subsidy per passenger journey for United Kingdom, Germany, Spain, Italy and France in Euros

Like roads, the French railways receive rail subsidies from the state in order to operate. Those amounted to €13.2 billion in 2013.

== Rolling stock ==
Alstom is the manufacturer of the TGV, and is behind many regional train models (Régiolis, SNCF Class Z 26500 ... )

== See also ==
- Eurail – International rail pass for travel in European countries
- Interrail – International rail pass for travel in European countries
- Transport in France
- Narrow gauge railways in France
- Rail transport in Europe
- Réseau Ferré National – Railroad lines and infrastructure owned by the French State and assigned to SNCF Réseau
