= Charles Fredrick Wiesenthal =

German physician and inventor

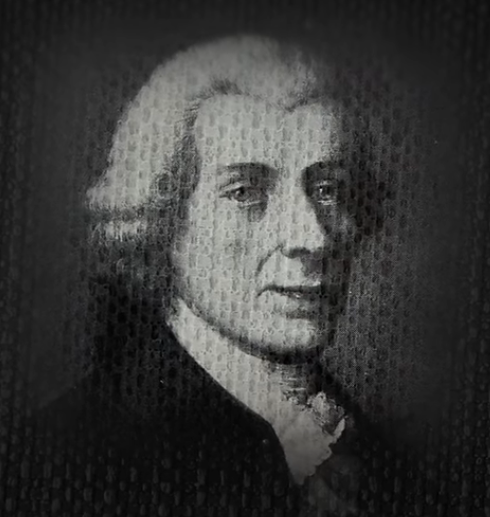
- Born: 1726; Germany
- Died: 1789 (aged 62–63); Baltimore, Maryland, U.S.
- Occupations: Inventor and physician
- Known for: Invention of mechanical sewing machine

Charles Fredrick Wiesenthal (1726–1789) was a German-American physician and inventor who was awarded the patent for the first known mechanical device for sewing in 1755.

Wiesenthal was born in the Kingdom of Prussia, but lived in England at the time of invention. He lived from 1755 to 1789 in Baltimore. For his invention of a double pointed needle with an eye at one end, he received the British Patent No. 701 (1755). Barthélemy Thimonnier reinvented the sewing machine in 1830.
