= History of rail transport in the United Kingdom =

The United Kingdom consists of Great Britain and Northern Ireland, and previously consisted of Great Britain and the whole of Ireland. Rail transport systems developed independently on the two islands of Great Britain and Ireland, and most of the railway construction in the Republic of Ireland was undertaken before independence in 1922. Thus, the logical division to discuss the history of railways in these areas is by geographical division, rather than the political division of nation states.

- History of rail transport in Great Britain discusses the history of rail transport on the larger of the British isles, comprising England, Scotland and Wales. Here, the vast majority of the railway system standardised on the standard gauge of 4 ft 8 1/2 in (1,435 mm).
- History of rail transport in Ireland discusses the history of rail transport on the island of Ireland, comprising the Republic of Ireland and Northern Ireland. Here a system using a broad gauge of 5 ft 3 in (1,600 mm) was used.
