= Saint-Étienne–Andrézieux railway =

French railway line (opened 1827)

Saint-Étienne - Andrézieux railway
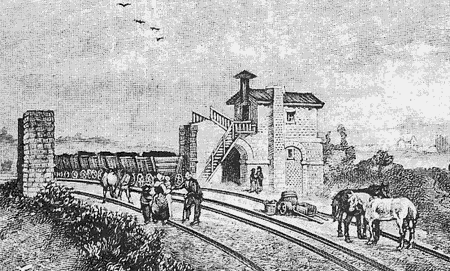
- An intermediate station of the line in 1836

Overview
- Termini: Saint-Étienne; Andrézieux

Service
- Type: Railway

History
- Opened: 1827

Technical
- Line length: 18 km (11.2 mi)
- Number of tracks: 1
- Track gauge: 1,435 mm (4 ft 8 1/2 in)

The Saint-Étienne to Andrézieux railway (ligne de Saint-Étienne à Andrézieux) was the first public railway in France and continental Europe, granted by order of King Louis XVIII to Louis-Antoine Beaunier in 1823.

Eighteen kilometers long and opened on 30 June 1827 to transport coal from the Forez mines to the river Loire, it marked the beginning of the expansion of the railway in France.

== History ==
=== The first railway concession in France ===
At the end of the First French Empire and the beginning of the Bourbon Restoration, the mining basin of the Loire was the largest in France; Saint-Étienne one of the largest cities, but the existing communication was not sufficient to meet industrial and mining needs.

Two local engineers, Louis de Gallois and Louis-Antoine Beaunier, after a study trip to England, concluded the necessity of a railway.

On 5 May 1821, Beaunier combined with financiers having interests in the region to demand the granting of a railway from Saint-Etienne to Andrézieux, about 23 kilometres long.

By royal decree of 25 February 1823, MM. de Lur-Saluces and others were allowed, under the title of the railroad company, to establish a line from the Loire at Pont-de-l’Âne on the river Furens (or Furan, its modern name), to the coal-mining area of Saint-Étienne.

Traffic was limited to goods, particularly coal. The mileage tax was 0.0186 francs per hectolitre of coal or 50 kg of goods.

The concession was perpetual.

=== The first railway company ===
The Ordinance of 21 July 1824 authorized and approved the constitution of a company called Compagnie du chemin de fer de Saint-Étienne à la Loire for the implementation and operation of the line. The company was formed for 99 years, unless renewed.

The capital was one million francs, represented by 200 shares of 5000 francs plus eight bonus shares given to the author of the project, Louis-Antoine Beaunier, who became the director of the company.

== Commissioning ==
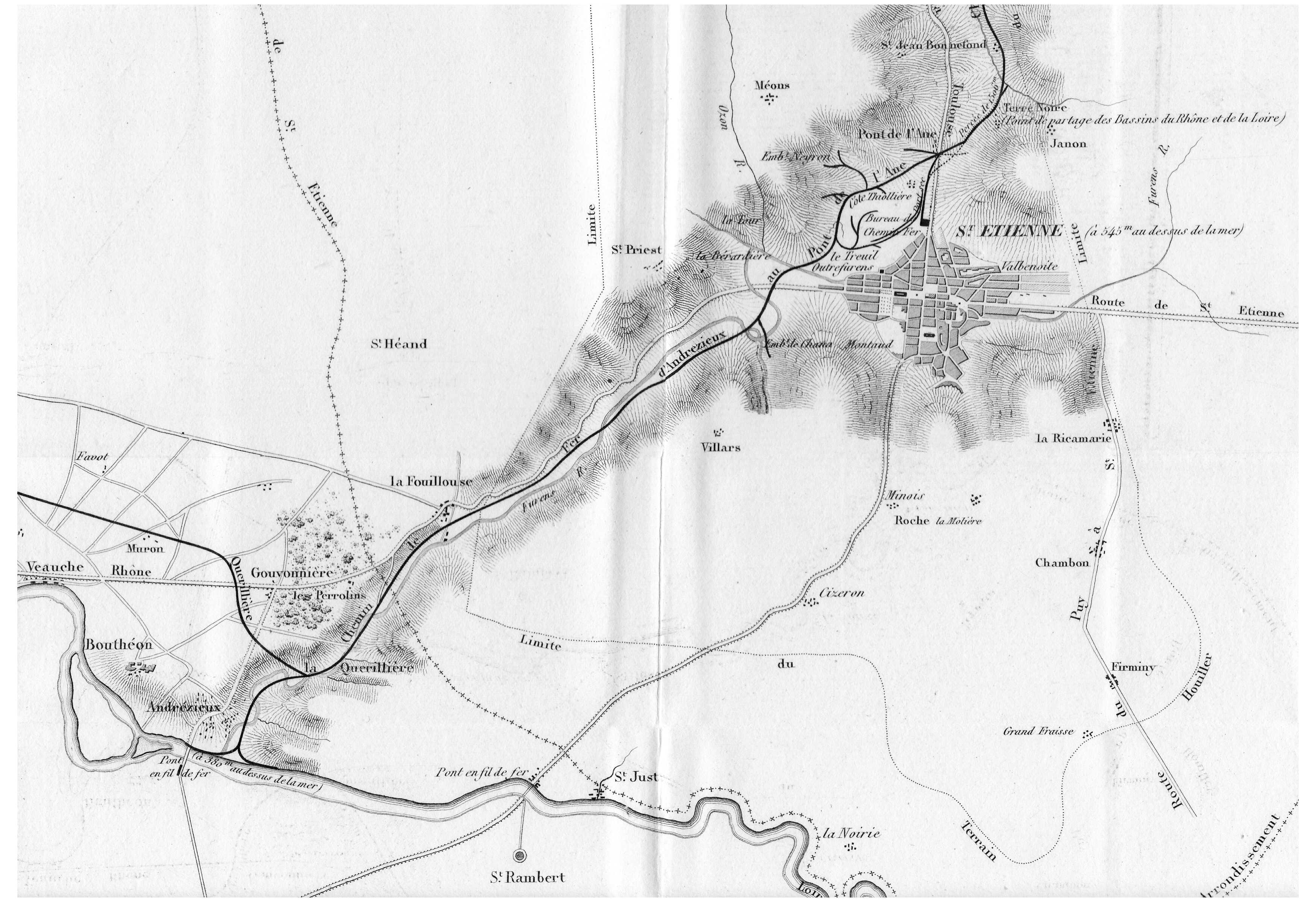
Carte du chemin de fer Saint-Étienne - Andrézieux (1837)

The line was used for trials from 1 May 1827 and fully opened on 30 June 1827. The "official" opening on 1 October 1828 was never held, nor any opening. This date refers to the first full financial year.

The first line was only for goods in wagons pulled by horses. On the return trip, they carried gravel, sand and lime. A major drawback of this project, which is that the Loire is navigable to Andrézieux only on a few days of the year. Accordingly, boats to sail downstream of the railway line were built in Saint Rambert (neighboring city of Andrézieux) and launched in Andrézieux, but would only sail down, not return. They were then sold at very low prices, which had a major effect on the price of coal transported.

=== Early travelers ===
The line was opened to passengers on 1 March 1832. It remained limited to animal traction at three miles per hour (4.8 km/h) until 1844, when the company bought two Schneider steam locomotives (The Loire and the Furens) with, until 1845, "mixed" traction for goods, animal for passengers.

=== Tracks ===
The line was single track from Saint-Étienne-de-Pont-bull to Andrezieux Port.

The track of the first French line adopted a system where the cast iron rails were 1.20 m long and were supported at each end by a cast chair, itself attached to the stone sleeper with large-headed nails driven into oak pegs.

== Evolution of the line ==
=== The Coteau - Andrézieux line ===
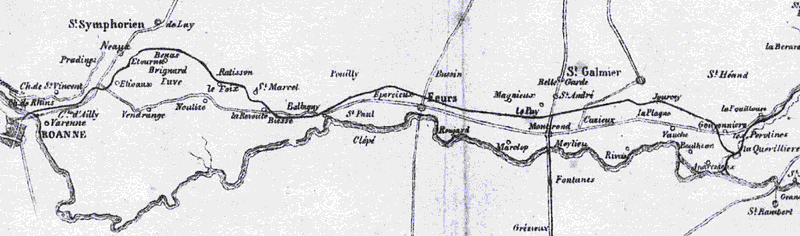
Map of Andrézieux - Le Coteau (- Roanne) in 1833, including the crossing of the Loire on the Pont de Pierre which was banned by the Roanne council

To transport coal Etienne, the Andrézieux line at Le Coteau was built in early 1830 by Mellet and Henry. In the Forez plain, it bypassed the towns of Veauche, Montrond-les-Bains, Feurs and Balbigny. From there, a succession of four inclined planes crossed the threshold of Neulise. The line joined the valley of Gand below Saint-Symphorien-de-Lay then to the Rhins where its track was taken over by the Roanne - Lyon line in 1869. On each inclined plane, the up train had to wait for a train down to balance. These expectations were scarcely compatible with passenger transport, yet the line was opened in August 1832 in the plains and from 15 March 1833 all the way.

=== Reconstruction of the 1850s ===
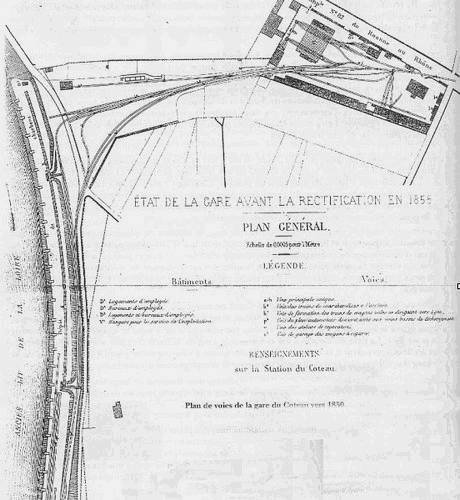
Station at Coteau port before 1857

In 1857, the Andrézieux to le Coteau line was restructured to allow operation by heavier and faster trains. The crossing of the threshold of Neulise was abandoned: the first railway to be closed in France. From Balbigny, the track followed the river to le Coteau via six tunnels. The bridge over the Loire between le Coteau and Roanne opened in 1858 .

== Bibliography ==
- François et Maguy Palau, Le rail en France, les 80 premières lignes, 1828-1851, 1995.
- Pierre Dauzet, Le siècle des chemins de fer en France, 1821-1938, Fontenay-aux-Roses, Bellenand, 1948.
- Jean Claude Faure et Gérard Vachez, La Loire berceau du rail Français, Éditions ARF, 2000.
- A. Cerclet, Code des chemins de fer: ou Recueil complet des lois, ordonnances, ..., 1 partie, Paris, Mathias, 1845, pages 1–14.
