= Louis-Antoine Beaunier =

French engineer

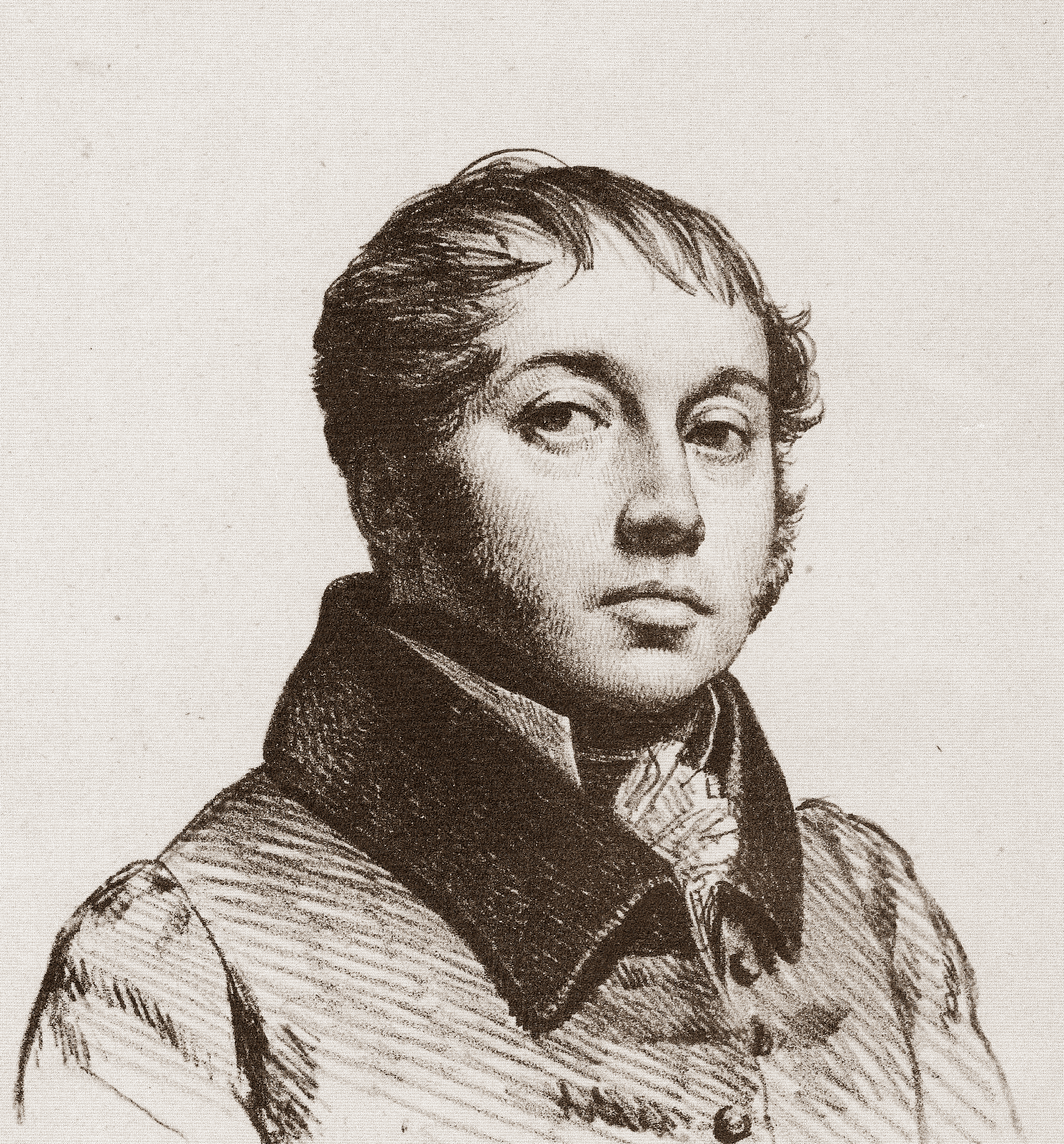

Louis-Antoine Beaunier (15 January 1779 in Melun – 20 August 1835 in Paris) was a French engineer.
