= Patrick D. Fleming =

American World War II flying ace

Patrick Dawson Fleming
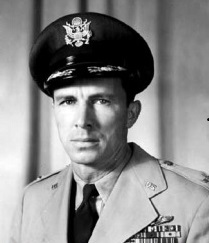
- Fleming as Deputy Commander of the 93rd Bomb Wing
- Born: January 17, 1918; New York City, U.S.
- Died: February 16, 1956 (aged 38); San Joaquin County, California, U.S.
- Burial place: Cedar Cemetery, Jamestown, Rhode Island, U.S.
- Military career
- Allegiance: United States
- Branch: United States Air Force; United States Navy
- Service years: 1941–1947 (USN); 1947–1956 (USAF)
- Rank: Colonel (USAF); Commander (USN)
- Nickname: Pat
- Units: USS Cincinnati (CL-6); Fighting Squadron 80; USS Ticonderoga (CV-14); Bombing Fighter Squadron 80; USS Hancock (CV-19); 306th Bomb Wing; 98th Bomb Wing
- Commands: Fighting Squadron 80
- Conflicts: World War II; Korean War
- Awards: Navy Cross; Air Force Distinguished Service Medal; Silver Star (2); Distinguished Flying Cross (4); Air Medal (6)

Patrick Dawson Fleming (January 17, 1918 – February 16, 1956) was a high-scoring World War II US Navy fighter ace, and later an accomplished US Air Force test pilot.

Fleming racked up 19 aerial victories in the Pacific Theatre, putting him in a three-way tie with Cornelius Nooy and Alexander Vraciu for fourth-highest-scoring Navy ace. At war's end he resigned his Navy commission and transferred to the Air Force, where he participated in early jet testing—including a flight in the Bell X-1 Chuck Yeager used to break the sound barrier. Fleming was later personally recruited by General Curtis LeMay to take part in Strategic Air Command (SAC) missions. With SAC Fleming participated in a classified "overflight" mission penetrating Soviet territory. Later he was promoted to deputy wing commander, 93rd Bomb Wing, the first operational group to receive the Boeing B-52 Stratofortress bomber. Fleming was among those killed in the first B-52 crash on February 16, 1956.

== World War II ==
Fleming was still aboard USS Cincinnati when the Japanese attacked Pearl Harbor on 7 December 1941. At the time, the ship was patrolling in the vicinity of the British West Indies as part of Task Group 3.8, ensuring French warships remained at port and searching for German blockade runners. After his tour of service with the light cruiser was completed in November 1942, Fleming went on to NAS Pensacola to earn his wings of gold. He was officially designated a Naval Aviator in March 1943. Later in the year he enrolled in night fighter training at NAS Quonset Point, Rhode Island, where he meet his soon-to-be wife Neville. Fleming completed training in November and moved to NAS Atlantic City to serve as a flight instructor while he awaited assignment to an active squadron. His waiting was short lived: on 1 February 1944 VF-80 was commissioned under the command of Lieutenant Commander Albert O. Vorse Jr. Patrick Fleming joined the rest of the squadron for training and carrier assignment. They finally departed for the war zone aboard USS Ticonderoga on 28 August 1944, with Fleming listed as Flight Officer.

=== VF-80 ===
==== November ====
"Vorse's Vipers" entered combat in the Pacific in early November 1944. Following closely on the heels of the Battle of Leyte Gulf, the Vipers flew missions over Luzon between 5—6 November as part of Task Group 38.3, aiding in the retaking of the Philippines. Patrick Fleming became one of the first men in his squadron to record a kill when on the first day of strikes he shot down a Mitsubishi A6M Zero after strafing/rocket attacks on shipping in Manila Bay. The lone Zero began with an altitude advantage, but upon seeing the division of American fighters dove towards the water to attempt escape. Greater weight and a more powerful engine put Fleming's Hellcat on his enemy's tail in short order, and with two bursts from the plane's six guns he sent the Zero crashing down in flames. From this point on when Fleming scored during a sortie, he would ensure enemy pilots didn't go down alone.

"Tico" returned to the Leyte and the Luzon area two more times in November to continue attacks on shipping at e.g. Ormoc Bay and Santa Cruz Harbor, and to destroy air installations at sites like Clark Field. Fleming's next aerial victories came on 25 November 1944 during the second strike of the day. Dive and torpedo bombers—along with their fighter escort—were vectored out to finish off a Mogami-class cruiser heavily damaged by the first strike. While the rest of the fighters worked over and successfully sank the crippled cruiser off Luzon's western coast, Fleming and his wingman Ens. Beaudry were busy serving as communications relay on the opposite side of the island. The two-man section noticed a group of 5 Yokosuka P1Y "Frances" bombers heading south towards the task group. They moved immediately to intercept, making overhead runs on the slower, comparatively ungainly twin-engine bombers. They knocked out 3 of the 5 with their first pass—two for Fleming and one for his wingman. There wasn't to be a second pass: the remaining Frances turned tail and ran.

==== December ====
On 14 December 1944, Fleming became an ace pilot. He led one of two VF-80 divisions flying together with VF outfits from USS Essex, Langley and San Jacinto on an afternoon fighter sweep over enemy airfields on Northern Luzon. Turning up nothing of interest at the first target area, the fighters re-routed southward to investigate reports of an enemy destroyer sighted earlier in the day. Cruising en route to those coordinates at 9,000′, they spotted a gaggle of twenty or so Japanese fighters (Zeros and Nakajima Ki-43 "Oscars") flying at lower altitude in loose formation, also heading on a southerly course. The American pilots jettisoned rockets and bombs before approach and a savage first pass was made on the unsuspecting bandits. Either the Japanese were taken completely by surprise or they misidentified the incoming Hellcats as friendlies. Whatever the case, about half of the Japanese fighters were destroyed or damaged in that first pass, negating their numerical superiority. Fleming claimed two.

When the F6F-5s pulled out of their runs, however, Japanese reinforcements arrived on the scene. VF-80 and company were outnumbered once again and no longer had surprise on their side. A wild dog fight ensued. In the melee many sections were dispersed, but Fleming and his wingman Beaudry managed to stick together. Fleming destroyed two more during the back-and-forth to run his day's score to four. Despite altitude and numerical disadvantages during this scrape, the pilots of VF-80 returned to their carrier without a single bullet hole in their planes, boasting a net of 19 enemy aircraft destroyed and more damaged.

==== January ====
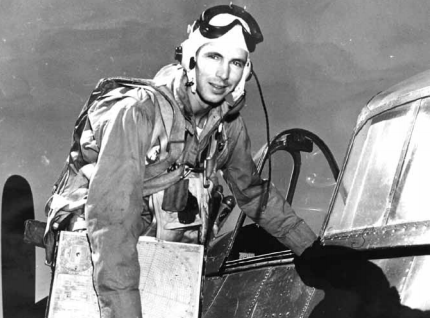
Fleming in 1945 getting ready to take to the skies

The next big day for Fleming came on 3 January 1945. He was chosen to lead three divisions on a morning sweep of airfields on central Luzon. Weather conditions rendered strikes difficult; even grouping up was problematic. By the time the divisions assembled only 10 of 12 fighters managed to get together, and due to cloud cover they chose slightly different targets than were originally assigned. Fleming's ten fighters twice encountered enemy formations. First, before reaching Koryu airfield, they spotted four Zeros flying south just off the western coast of the island. When the Japanese noticed the Americans, they split into two groups of two on separate headings. One pair continued southward while the other turned inland. The Vipers similarly split into two groups of six and four respectively. Fleming and his wingman Beaudry, in the latter group, loosed their ordnance and raced after the Zeros. Once again Fleming got the better of Beaudry, downing one along with Lt.(jg) Woodward. The men in the other group were similarly successful: both enemy fighters destroyed, no losses incurred. Those among the 10 Hellcats who held onto their payloads delivered them on Koryu and Shinchiku, taking on meager anti-aircraft fire in the process but scoring significant hits on installations on the runways themselves. In the wake of this bombing/strafing activity the sweep encountered its second batch of Japanese fighters, this time consisting of Oscars or Zeros, and Nakajima Ki-44 fighters nicknamed "Tojo." The enemies were split 3-2 between thin cloud cover, apparently trying to set a trap for any enemy fighters coming it at lower altitudes. Fleming et al. were positioned just right to see both groups, however, and the balance of Hellcats came in hard on the heels of the high cover fliers. All three Japanese fighters broke ranks and flew singularly, either to flee or to turn into the American charge. It was over quickly though, and results were similar to those experienced earlier in the day. It was Beaudry's turn to flame his quarry this time; two other pilots had the same luck with their targets. Seeing the high-fliers taken well in hand, Fleming zoomed down through the clouds on the lure planes. He flamed the Tojo on his first past and then shot the Oscar/Zeke off Ensign Parrish's tail, racking up a total of three for the day's efforts.

At the close of 1944, the US Navy decided it needed to significantly alter carrier air group composition to include many more fighter aircraft. The new norm of Japanese kamikaze tactics required beefed up combat air patrols for task groups and the implementation of supplemental "Jack Patrols" to spot low-flying bandits. To ease the bureaucratic difficulty of expanding fighter squadrons this way, existing squadrons were split into Fighter (VF) and Fighter-Bomber (VBF) squadrons. When this division was finally achieved aboard Ticonderoga on 10 January, Patrick Fleming became Executive Officer of the newly formed VBF-80.

Towards the end of January Ticonderoga moved to execute strikes against Formosa, prompting the depleted Japanese navy and air forces to respond with Kamikaze tactics. The morning of the attack on 21 January offered unlimited visibility and bright skies, giving Japanese pilots clear lines of sight to their targets. A handful got past the CAP and successfully dodged anti-aircraft fire put up by the task group. Two of these struck the flight deck and island structure of the carrier, setting off bombs in compartments adjacent to the hangar deck where fueled, armed planes lay in wait. Explosions wracked the ship, but the firefighting teams aboard Tico ultimately managed to quench the flames. No longer in fighting condition, Ticonderoga retired to Ulithi and Carrier Group 80 (CVG-80) took up residence aboard the USS Hancock.

==== February ====
February was a big month for Patrick Fleming and for the whole of Vorse's Vipers. On the 15th, the Fast Carrier Task Force began launching its first aerial assault against Tokyo. During two consecutive days of this operation—16 February and 17 February 1945—Ticonderoga's fighters shot down more than 65 Japanese aircraft with 25 or more probably destroyed or damaged in aerial combat; Fleming alone scored nine between the two days, running his final tally to 19 confirmed kills and cementing his position as the squadron's high-scorer. The Vipers suffered only three combat losses in these sorties.

Strikes against Chiba Peninsula's airfields occurred on 16 February. Fleming led a noontime sweep through hazy skies with the objective of destroying installations at Mobara airfield, one of the major strips in the vicinity of Tokyo. In the immediate wake of successful fighter bombing runs on Mobara's hangars Fleming spotted a band of Japanese fighters, mostly Zeros, milling about at high altitude north of the target zone. He chased the nearest enemies up to their level just under the clouds, charging his guns for the first pass. Two were quickly flamed from astern; the rest fled. Following some of the running Zekes down almost to ground level at Mobara, Fleming stuck with his quarry even as anti-aircraft fire filled the skies around him. Only after he'd exploded the two planes he was chasing did he pull out of his run and away from enemy fire. One more victory was scored by Fleming before returning to Hancock, running his day's total to five.

In the early morning hours of the 17th Fleming knocked another four out of the air. He was again assigned as leader and again flew with the usual suspects in his division: his wingman Beaudry, as well as a section consisting of Lt. Cormier and Ens. Fraifogle. This sweep was assigned more airfields to disable starting in the vicinity of the Katori Area, with subsequent targets heading south as far as Mobara. Finding no significant opposition at Katori, the ten-man sweep proceeded past Yachimata towards Mobara flying at 12,000′. Before arriving there, however, they spotted 15-20 Japanese aircraft at around 6,000′ including a group of six Nakajima Ki-27 "Nate" fighters. The Nate model was out of date even before Pearl Harbor and stood little chance against the significantly more advanced Hellcat. Lt. Fleming tore into the half dozen aged fighters, picking off four to the rest of his division's two. After the uneven match—VF-80 again reported no bullets taken in the brief scuffle—, the division headed down to the airfields for rocket attacks and strafing before their return to Hancock.

== Air Force Service ==
After post-war leave, Fleming was given command of a fighter squadron, a promotion to Lieutenant Commander, and transferred to the carrier USS Boxer (CV-21). Immediately afterwards he was sent to Naval Air Station Patuxent River for test pilot training. It is at this point Fleming made up his mind to resign from the Navy and transfer to the Army Air Forces. He picked up with the USAAF exactly where he left off with the Navy: he went to test pilot school at Wright Field, working his way up to chief of the Fighter Section of the Flight Test Division.

At the time, jet fighter operational use was still in its infancy. Fleming test flew both the Lockheed P-80 Shooting Star and Republic F-84 Thunderjet and in each instance experienced harrowing technical malfunctions. While testing the ability of bombers to tow the short-range jets of the day, Fleming's P-80 became stuck to the towline of the B-29 it was flying with. The tow would not release and even snapped back to obstruct Fleming's view. The towing program was cancelled soon thereafter. Later, participating in the first P-84 flights across the Atlantic Ocean to England, Fleming's cockpit heat control stuck during his ride from Iceland to Scotland. He endured scorching 170 degree heat, arriving at his destination thoroughly dehydrated. He had better luck in "Glamorous Glennis," the Bell X-1 aircraft Chuck Yeager used as the first man to pass the speed of sound. Fleming took the X-1 to Mach 1.2; its fastest recorded speed was to be Mach 1.45.

Fleming's talent propelled him into a group of elite Air Force pilots operating at the edge of American strategic planning and technological advance. At the time this meant participation in Strategic Air Command initiatives. Moving from jet fighters to jet bombers, Fleming served at Kirtland Air Force Base flying North American B-45 Tornados and Boeing B-47 Stratojets. On August 9, 1951, Fleming was part of the flight crew in a B-47 flying from Fairbanks, Alaska to Wichita, Kansas. The record-setting 2,800-mile flight took just 5 hours and 36 minutes to complete. Around this time same Fleming took Life photographer Margaret Bourke-White up in a B-47 for an article on the SAC.

A more dangerous B-47 mission occurred in 1952, when Fleming and other SAC pilots were personally approached by General LeMay to conduct covert "overflight" missions deep into Soviet territory. Project 52 AFR-18 took place on October 15, 1952, Fleming leading the crew in the backup B-47. His route covered Wrangel Island and then held a "racetrack" pattern over the Chukchi Sea. The main crew, led by Donald Hillman, photographed Siberian sites and was spotted by MiG fighters in the middle of the mission, but the Russians were ultimately unable to engage the photo-reconnaissance bombers. The flight was considered a success, winning the approval of newly elected President Dwight D. Eisenhower, who continued the overflight program during his presidency.

Fleming was transferred to Headquarters Strategic Air Command at Offutt Air Force Base, in January 1952, serving there until June 1953, when he joined the 98th Bomb Wing at Fairchild Air Force Base. Deployed to Yokota Air Base, Japan, Fleming flew combat missions in the B-29 Superfortress during the last month of the Korean War. He returned to the U.S. in December 1953.

Pat Fleming was ultimately promoted to deputy commander of the 93rd Bomb Wing at Castle Air Force Base. They were the first unit to receive the B-52 and Fleming was the first SAC pilot to fly one. He flew as pilot instructor after logging extensive hours in the new aircraft.

== Death ==
Fleming was killed in a crash on February 16, 1956, while serving as a supervisor on a routine training flight. Around seven hours after taking off from Castle Air Force Base in a B-52 Stratofortress, a turbine wheel of the right forward alternator broke apart and punctured a cell of the forward body fuel tank. The resulting leak spilled fuel into the lower crew compartment and ignited a blaze that ultimately downed the bomber. Three died in the crash/explosion that resulted, and Fleming, the fourth casualty, lost his life when he bailed out of the flaming craft. Fire damage to his parachute prevented its proper deployment as he fell to Earth. He was killed on impact. This tragedy marked the very first B-52 crash.

== Awards ==
Fleming received the following decorations:

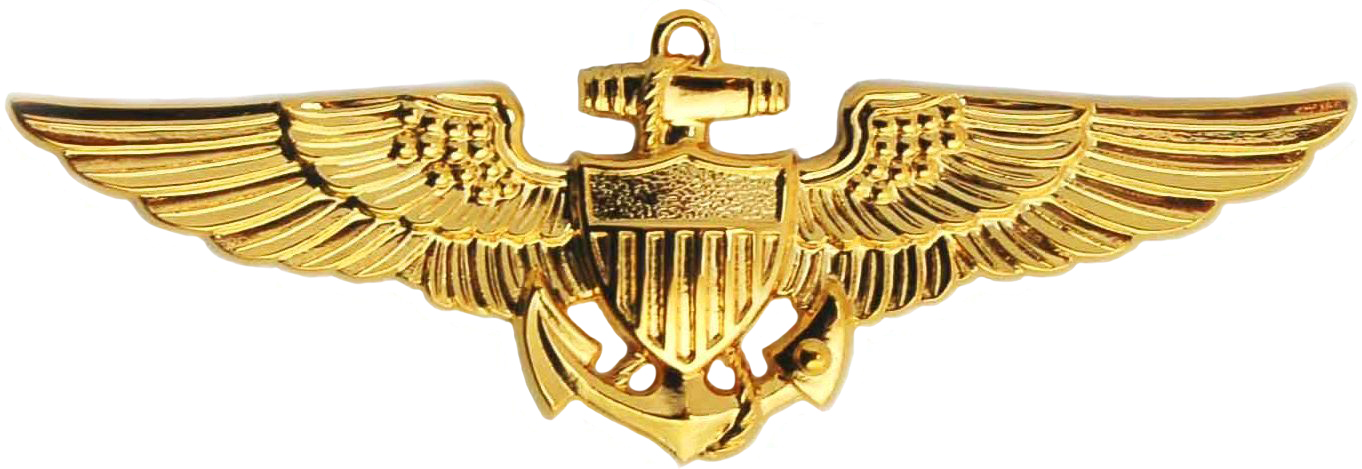

USAF Senior Pilot Badge
Naval Aviator Badge
Navy Cross	Air Force Distinguished Service Medal	Silver Star w/ one 5/16" Gold Stars
Distinguished Flying Cross w/ two 5/16" Gold Stars (USN)	Distinguished Flying Cross (USAF)	Air Medal with three 5/16" Gold Stars (USN)
Air Medal w/ 1 bronze oak leaf cluster (USAF)	Army Commendation Medal	Navy Unit Commendation w/ one 3/16" bronze star
Combat Readiness Medal	China Service Medal	American Defense Service Medal w/ Fleet Clasp (3/16" Bronze Star)
American Campaign Medal	European-African-Middle Eastern Campaign Medal w/ one 3/16" bronze star	Asiatic–Pacific Campaign Medal w/ four 3/16" bronze stars
World War II Victory Medal	Army of Occupation Medal w/ 'Japan' clasp	National Defense Service Medal w/ one 3/16" bronze star
Korean Service Medal w/ one 3/16" bronze star	Air Force Longevity Service Award w/ bronze oak leaf cluster	Philippine Liberation Medal w/ two 3/16" bronze stars
Philippine Independence Medal	United Nations Service Medal	Korean War Service Medal

=== Navy Cross citation ===
Lieutenant Patrick Dawson Fleming
U.S. Navy
Date Of Action: February 16, 1945

The President of the United States of America takes pleasure in presenting the Navy Cross to Lieutenant Patrick Dawson Fleming, United States Navy, for extraordinary heroism in operations against the enemy while serving as Pilot of a carrier-based Navy Fighter Plane in Bombing Fighting Squadron EIGHTY (VBF-80), attached to the U.S.S. HANCOCK (CV-19), in the action against Tokyo air fields on 16 February 1945. He skillfully and courageously led a division of planes on a fighter sweep against enemy airpower. During the action, he personally destroyed five aircraft in the air amid heavy anti-aircraft fire. His skill and courage coupled with his leadership and complete disregard for his personal safety were at all times in keeping with the highest traditions of the United States Naval Service.

Patrick Fleming was also posthumously awarded the Air Force Association's David C. Schilling Award in 1957. The award is given annually for "the most outstanding contribution in the field of flight."
