= William O. Burch =

Former U.S. Rear Admiral and Naval Aviator

William Oscar Burch Jr.
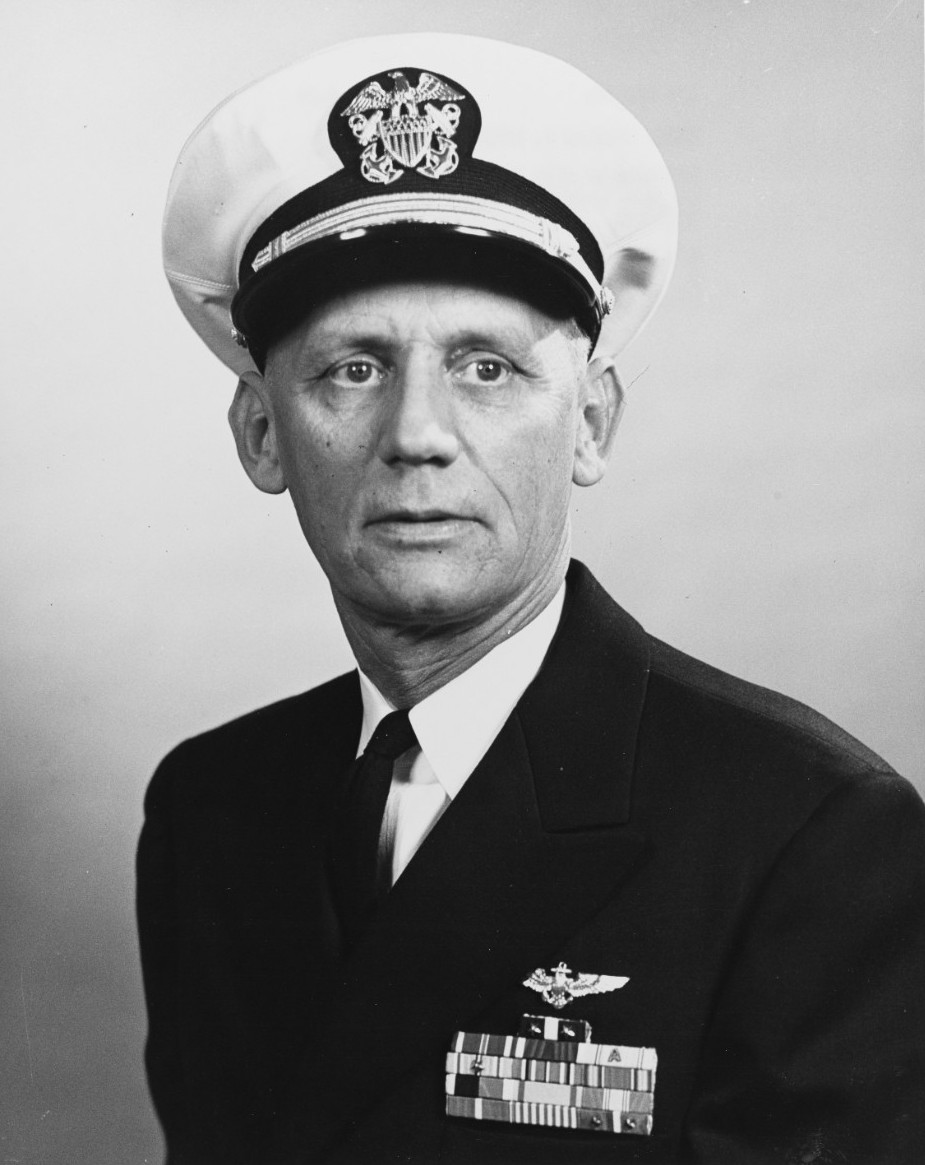
- Born: June 27, 1904; Paducah, Kentucky
- Died: January 21, 1989 (aged 84); Virginia Beach, Virginia
- Burial place: Eastern Shore Chapel Cemetery, Virginia Beach, VA
- Spouse: Emily Lou Culbertson
- Military career
- Allegiance: United States of America
- Branch: United States Navy
- Service years: 1927–1962
- Rank: Rear Admiral
- Nickname: "Bill"
- Commands: Scouting Squadron 5 (VS-5) Naval Air Station Cecil Field; USS Pine Island (AV-12); USS Tarawa (CV-40) Naval Aviation Safety Center
- Conflicts: World War II: Marshalls–Gilberts raids; Invasion of Salamaua–Lae; Invasion of Tulagi; Battle of the Coral Sea; South China Sea raid
- Awards: Navy Cross (3); Legion of Merit

William Oscar Burch Jr. (June 27, 1904 – January 21, 1989) was a decorated naval aviator and triple Navy Cross recipient during who reached the rank of rear admiral in the United States Navy.

== Early life and education ==
William Oscar Burch Jr. was born to William Oscar and Elizabeth Burch (née Metzler) in Paducah, Kentucky, 27 June 1904. He became an Eagle Scout in 1922, and in 1923 he was accepted into the U.S. Naval Academy Class of 1927. While there, he participated in soccer, baseball, and bowling. After graduating from Annapolis in 1927, he was commissioned as an ensign in the United States Navy.

== Early military career ==
Upon receiving his commission, Ensign Burch was assigned to the USS Medusa (AR-1), followed by the USS West Virginia (BB-48). In March 1930, he reported to the Naval Air Station Pensacola for flight instruction and graduated as a naval aviator near the end of that year. Following flight instruction, he became a junior aviation officer aboard the USS Pennsylvania (BB-38). In May 1933 he returned to Pensacola as a flight instructor until June 1935.

== World War II ==
Lieutenant Commander Burch was a flight leader in Scouting Squadron FIVE (VS-5) attached to the USS Yorktown (CV-5), flying the Douglas SBD Dauntless dive bomber. Burch and VS-5 took part in the Invasion of Salamaua–Lae on March 10, 1942. Performing dive bombing attacks on Japanese forces, VS-5 achieved seven direct hits, resulting in the sinking of three ships. One of those direct hits was from Burch, resulting in him being awarded his first Navy Cross.

Shortly after the Invasion of Salamaua–Lae, Burch became the commander of Scouting Squadron FIVE (VS-5). Still attached to the Yorktown, he led his squadron taking part in the invasion of Tulagi on May 4, 1942. In Tulagi Harbor, Burch and his squadron damaged or destroyed eight Japanese ships. A few days later they again engaged the Japanese at the Battle of the Coral Sea. On May 7, the Japanese aircraft carrier Shōhō was sighted and VS-5 was sent out with other squadrons from the USS Lexington to intercept the carrier. Burch was the first pilot to successfully attack the Shōhō, dropping his 1,000 pound bomb directly through the middle of the flight deck. The following day, May 8, 1942, Burch led his squadron on another attack, targeting the Japanese aircraft carrier Shōkaku. Again, Burch successfully dropped his payload, directly hitting the deck of the Shōkaku amidships. The Shōkaku sustained three direct hits, leaving her severely damaged. For his actions in the engagements at the invasion of Tulagi and the Battle of the Coral Sea, Burch was awarded a Gold Star in lieu of his second Navy Cross by Admiral Chester W. Nimitz, Commander, U.S. Pacific Fleet.

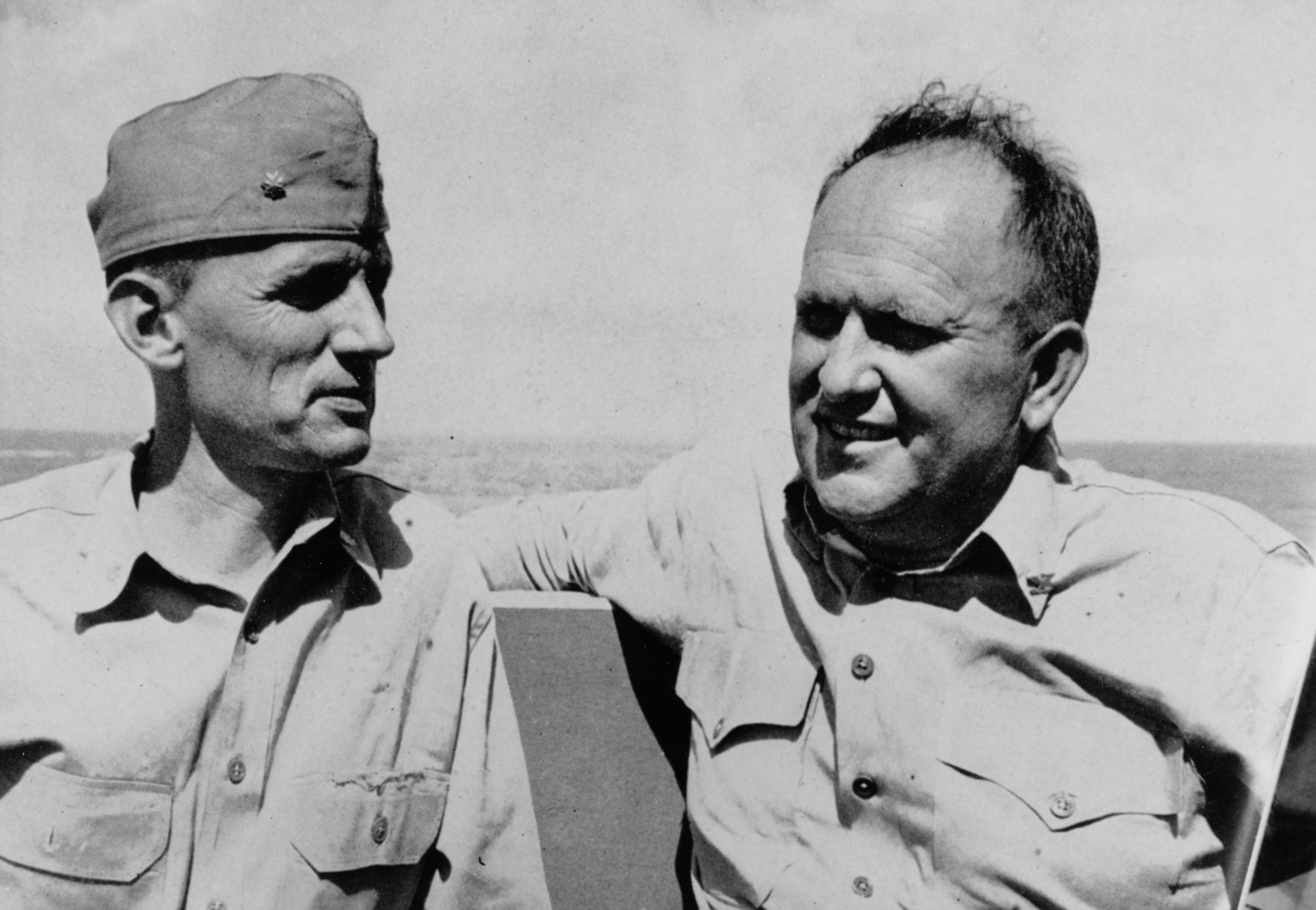
Commanding Officer, Captain Dixie Kiefer, USN (right), and Executive Officer, Commander William O. Burch Jr., USN (left), on the bridge of the USS Ticonderoga (CV-14)

In June and August 1942, Burch served as a carrier training officer in the Pacific. Following that assignment, he served as an executive officer for the Advanced Carrier Training Group until October 1942. As a prospective commanding officer of the USS Ticonderoga (CV-14), Burch reported to Naval Station Newport. Burch was given the position of executive officer upon the Ticonderoga's commissioning in May 1944. Deployed to the Pacific Ocean as part of Task Force 38, the Ticonderoga was near Formosa on January 21, 1945, when she was attacked by a Japanese kamikaze, causing a fire in the hangar deck. Executive Officer Burch was the first to man a hose and organized fire-fighting crews. For his actions on the USS Ticonderoga Burch was awarded a second Gold Star in lieu of a third Navy Cross. He served in that position until June 1945.

== Post war career ==
With the end of World War II, Burch's next assignment was as Commanding Officer of Naval Air Station Fort Lauderdale. He held that role at the same time as doomed Flight 19 in December 1945.
