= William Burch =

William Burch may refer to:

- William P. Burch (c. 1846–1926), American Thoroughbred horse racing trainer
- William O. Burch (1904–1989), United States Navy admiral
