= Albert O. Vorse Jr. =

American fighter ace (1914–1979)

Albert Ogden Vorse Jr.
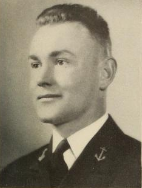
- Albert O. Vorse Jr. at US Naval Academy, c. 1937
- Born: August 9, 1914; Philadelphia, United States
- Died: October 27, 1979 (aged 65)
- Military career
- Allegiance: United States
- Branch: United States Navy
- Service years: 1937–1959
- Rank: Rear admiral
- Nickname: "Scoop"
- Commands: VF-80; CVG-80
- Conflicts: World War II: Battle of the Coral Sea; Battle of the Eastern Solomons; Battle of Iwo Jima
- Awards: Navy Cross; Silver Star; Distinguished Flying Cross (2)

Albert Ogden "Scoop" Vorse Jr. (August 9, 1914 – October 27, 1979) was an accomplished United States Navy aviator and flying ace of World War II who participated in some of the most prominent actions of the Pacific theater, including the Battle of the Coral Sea and the Guadalcanal Campaign. Vorse served in early fighter squadrons with legendary figures like Butch O'Hare and Jimmy Thach. Rising in rank throughout the war, he would act as executive officer and operations officer in different squadrons before being given command of his own squadron, VF-80, the eponymous Vorse's Vipers, assigned to Carrier Air Group 80 (CVG-80) on the USS Ticonderoga. Vorse ended the war as commander of CVG-80 and ultimately achieved rear admiral rank before his retirement in 1959.

== Early life and career ==
Vorse was born 9 August 1914 to Albert Ogden Vorse and Emma Yarnall Vorse. He was the eldest of three children, having both a brother, Frank Miller Vorse, and later a sister, Mary Ellen Vorse. Albert O. Vorse Sr. graduated from Yale Forest School in 1910 and worked as a forester for the landscape architecture firm Peters, Byrne and Company around the time of Albert Jr.'s birth. Albert Vorse Jr. entered the Phillips Academy Andover in 1929. While attending the prestigious prep. school, Vorse was on the wrestling, swimming, football and track teams. He graduated as a senior in 1933 and went on to the United States Naval Academy at Annapolis, Maryland. "Scoop" is again portrayed in football gear in his 'Lucky Bag' senior yearbook.

Upon graduation from the U.S. Naval Academy in 1937, Ensign Vorse reported for first duty to Naval Base San Pedro, where he was assigned to USS Astoria. He stayed with the ship for a couple years, serving as an officer when it returned the ashes of former Japanese Ambassador Hirosi Saito to his country in 1939. 15 March 1940 he was detached from the ship and sent to Naval Air Base Pensacola for aerial training. This same year his wife would give birth to their first son on 9 December 1940.

== World War II ==
=== VF-3 ===
Vorse was attached to the aircraft carrier Saratoga's VF-3 fighter squadron in January 1941. VF-3's division leaders were men like Commanding Officer Jimmy Thach, credited with developing the eponymous Thach Weave, and Donald Lovelace, for whom the destroyer escort USS Lovelace was later named. Vorse was a section leader in the squadron. VF-3 bore an imposing pedigree: it was the first carrier-trained unit (then called VF-2) and among the first to employ dive bombing tactics (as VB-2B).

Though his stint with VF-3 was a short one, he did see aerial combat with the unit and was awarded the Distinguished Flying Cross for actions performed on 20 February 1942. On that day, several Japanese Kawanishi H6K flying boats had followed the aircraft carrier Lexington and vectored Japanese carrier bombers and Mitsubishi G4M land attack planes to her coordinates. Thach's 1st Division splashed some of these snoopers but ran through its fuel reserves and was forced to land back aboard Lexington. Lovejoy's 2nd Division (of which Vorse was a section leader) went up as relief, but had yet to meet the enemy by the time Gayler's 3rd Division—launched early on a hunch—went skyward. What transpired next would give the Navy its first ace of World War II as well as its first Medal of Honor recipient for the war.

The first group of the Imperial Japanese Navy's 4th kokutai showed up on the scene and was rapidly intercepted by Lexington's CAP. The men of VF-3's 3rd Division were the first to intercept this initial wave of bombers, and each section of Gayler's division was credited at least one bomber downed. Meanwhile, as 2nd Division was en route to landing, they were re-routed for intercept to assist 3rd Division. They arrived just in time to harry the disorganized bombers. Vorse and four other pilots in 2nd Division finished the Japanese attack, earning one credit each before they moved on to the attack planes that were retreating. Refueled and ready to enter the arena once more, Thach's 1st Division—sans a reserve crew of Butch O'Hare and Duff Dufilho—took to the skies just as a gas-depleted 2nd Division was finally landing aboard Lexington. The 1st Division worked over the land planes and even had an assist by a Lexington Douglas SBD Dauntless from VS-2, which finished off the Japanese land planes and forced the last air-worthy bomber to retreat.

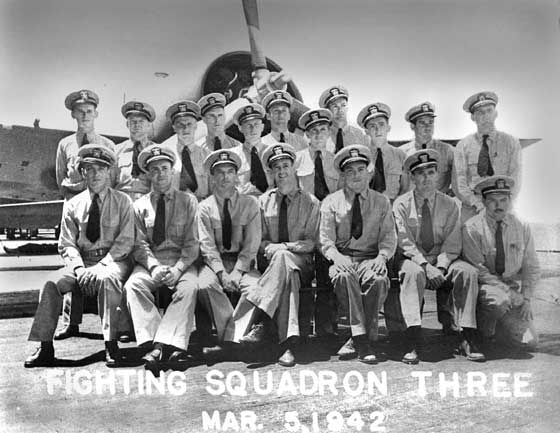
Albert O. "Scoop" Vorse Jr. pictured seated second from the left

A second division of the 4th kokutai, split up from its sister division in order to better find Lexington in the overcast weather, would be badly thrashed by O'Hare and Dufilho. The two pilots were the only fighters available to intercept the bombers in time given available resources. With "Duff" Dufilho's guns jammed, it would fall to O'Hare to single-handedly scatter the enemy. O'Hare performed the feat, earning himself five kills and propelling him into the history books as the Navy's first Medal of Honor recipient and ace of the war.

=== VF-2 ===
After Saratoga was torpedoed on 11 January 1942, the aircraft carrier was forced to return to Pearl Harbor for repairs. Soon to arrive at Pearl Harbor for refitting and redeployment was USS Lexington, which incidentally needed experienced aviators to fill out the ranks of its much-depleted VF-2 squadron. The two had already traded air groups in the wake of Saratoga's battle damage so there was some familiarity between the carriers. Since Saratoga's repairs would take months to finish and the Navy was aware of trouble brewing in the area of the Coral Sea, 12 April 1942 Jimmy Thach loaned a number of VF-3 pilots to VF-2 CO Paul H. Ramsey. Vorse was among those sent over to Lexington and would remain with VF-2 until 16 June 1942, mere weeks before its disestablishment.

The Battle of the Coral Sea would begin seemingly inauspiciously for "Scoop" Vorse. Rotten weather caused him and his wingmen to lose track of the VT-2 Douglas TBD Devastators they were charged with shepherding to the target area. With no hope of reconnecting with the outbound torpedo bombers, his section was forced to head back to Lexington. The change in plans wound up assisting in the defense of Task Force 17, however, when Vorse, returning to the formation of ships, broke through the clouds and into the flak-filled skies above Lexington and Yorktown. Almost immediately he spotted a lone Aichi D3A Val dive bomber making a run on Yorktown. Vorse zeroed in from above and followed the Val into the beginnings of its dive, shearing the enemy aircraft's wing from its fuselage with a hail of bullets. Even with this last-second effort, the Japanese bomb splashed dangerously close to Yorktown, exploding only a few hundred feet from port.

=== Return to VF-3 ===
After Coral Sea, the loaned pilots returned to VF-3. However, with Lexington sunk and VF-2 attached to Saratoga, VF-3 was now effectively homeless. In the interim it operated out of Pearl as a training unit. Jimmy Thach passed command to Butch O'Hare on 24 June 1942, making him CO, and O'Hare subsequently appointed Vorse as his executive officer (XO). However, the Navy was in the midst of a major reshuffling of fighter squadrons, including a move from twenty-seven to thirty-six plane squadrons as a standard complement. In the post-Midway milieu, fighter-starved air groups were actively recruiting from squadrons like O'Hare's VF-3. Wanting to get back out to sea, Vorse took Capt. James M. Shoemaker up on an offer to join VF-6.

=== VF-6 ===
Vorse was transferred on 6 July 1942, and the VF-6 "Shooting Stars" departed nine days later with USS Enterprise, as part of Task Force 16, under the command of Admiral Thomas C. Kinkaid.

Enterprise steamed along with Saratoga and Wasp as part of Task Force 61, under Vice Admiral Frank Jack Fletcher. It would support the U.S. Navy's first true counter-offensive and amphibious assault in the Pacific Ocean Theater, inaugurating the fighting at Guadalcanal on 7 August 1942. TF 61 arrived at Guadalcanal undetected and ahead of Japanese expectations. As a result, Japanese materiel such as planes for the newly constructed runways had yet to arrive, and Japanese defenses were neither manned nor even fully operational. When Saratoga and Enterprise's air groups began their runs on Red Beach in the pre-dawn hours they were virtually unopposed. The Japanese air response came from the 5th Air Attack Force, which scrapped plans to attack the Allied airfield at Rabi and instead launched straightaway for Guadalcanal. This included Japanese aces like Hiroyoshi Nishizawa and Saburō Sakai of the Tainan Air Group.

As leader of division Red 5 of VF-6, Vorse regularly flew CAP, including a number of memorable sorties during the month of August. On the very first day of combat, 7 August, he would launch three times: initially to run SCAP (air patrol for the transport screen) at 0642 hours, then CAP at 1015, and finally an attack flight sent up at around 1320, in which he encountered an enemy bomber formation. Vorse's section was headed for Tulagi at the time and was so surprised to see the three-plane section of Val dive bombers from 5th Air Attack Force's 2nd Air Group that they almost flew past them. Only Vorse acted quickly enough to chase the Vals into their diving run, downing the trailing plane before it could release its payload.

For the next two or so weeks there would be significantly less action for Vorse and VF-6. With Lexington sunk at Coral Sea and Yorktown lost at Midway, Fletcher sought to protect his aircraft carriers as best he could. On 10 August, TF 61 moved south for refueling and thereafter remained in the vicinity of the Solomons, adhering to coordinates that would keep it out of range of Japanese pilots stationed at Rabaul. Air Groups from Enterprise, Wasp and Saratoga, as well as those from Shōkaku and Zuikaku, as well as the light carrier Ryūjō, conducted regular anti-submarine patrols and combat air patrols while searching for each other's naval units. On 22 August, Vorse downed a Kawanishi flying boat reconnaissance plane before it could get within 25 miles of TF 61.

The two forces finally engaged each other at the Battle of the Eastern Solomons, on 24 August. At 1430 Vorse led the first CAP group to intercept bombers and fighter escorts making their way towards the U.S. carriers. Japanese Zero fighters effectively prevented Vorse and the men of his group—Register, Loesch and Sumrall—from engaging the incoming dive bombers, which by day's end would score three hits on Enterprise. Though the bombers got through, Vorse, Register and Sumrall each downed one Zero by the end of their first sortie. Out of both ammunition and gas by CAP's end, the men of Vorse's division were forced to land and refuel aboard Saratoga, with the notable exception of Vorse himself, who ran out of fuel and did a water landing off her stern.

Due to extensive damage from the Japanese bombing run, Enterprise was forced to retire to berth in the Tonga Islands, steaming steadily in that direction until it arrived 30 August 1942. By the time it reached port it had disembarked Vorse's VF-6, along with all of Air Group 6.

=== VF-80 ===
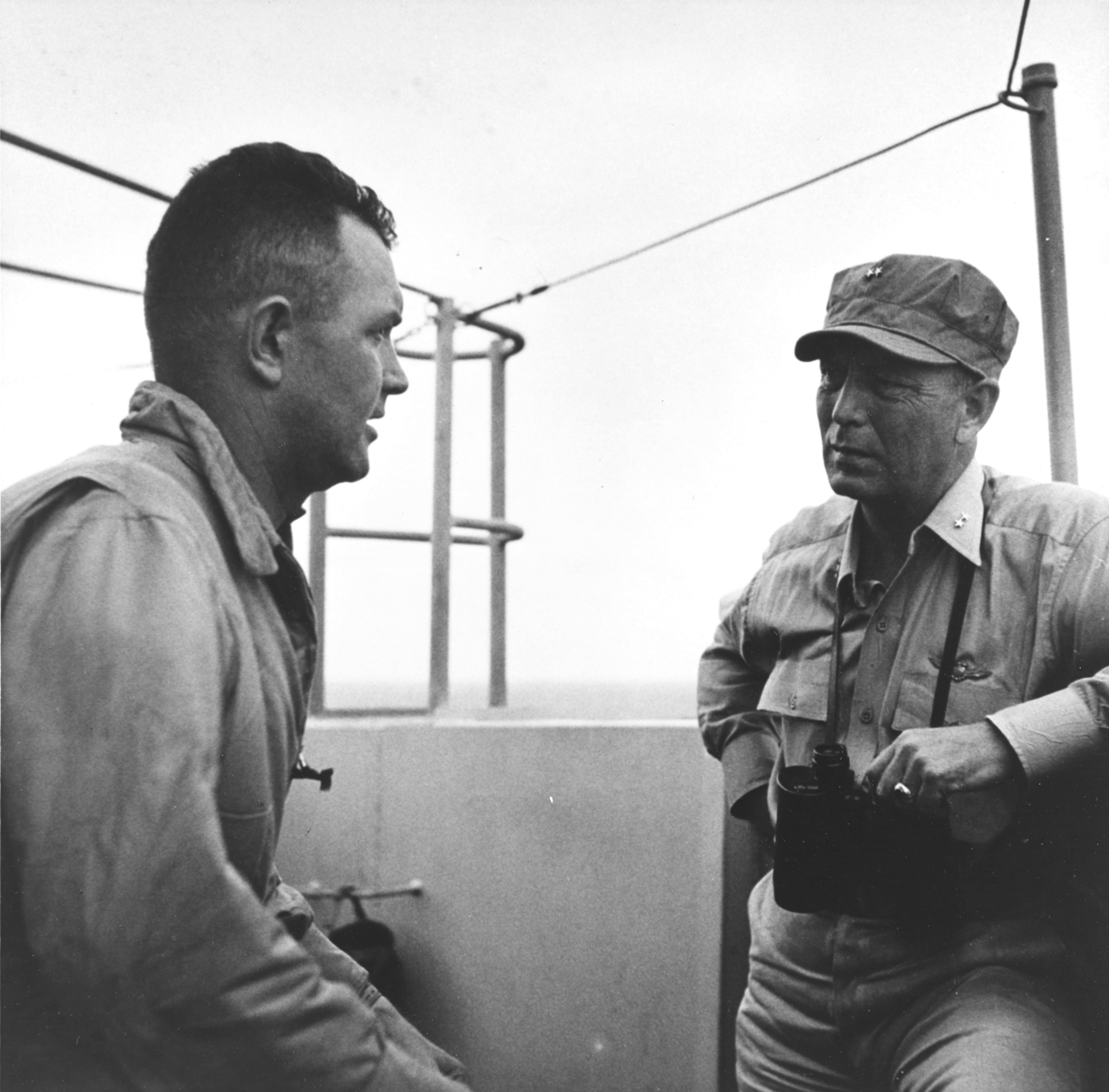
Commander Carrier Air Group 80 (CVG-80), Commander A.O. Vorse, discusses the results of the 6 November 1944 fighter raid on Manila with Rear Admiral Arthur W. Radford, right.

VF-80 was established 1 February 1944 with Vorse as Commanding Officer and Frank G. Gooding as XO. On 5 June 1944 VF-80—known as "Vorse's Vipers"—became officially attached to Carrier Air Group 80 (CVG-80) on the USS Ticonderoga. They departed for Pearl Harbor from Norfolk Naval Shipyard around 30 August 1944. On 16 October 1944 Vorse would be relieved of CO duty and transfer to Commander CVG-80, overseeing the bomber, fighter and torpedo squadrons aboard Ticonderoga. Two days later on 18 October, Ticonderoga headed for Enewetak Atoll, thence to Ulithi and ultimately Luzon, the largest island in the Philippines, where VF-80 carried out its first strike.

From 5–14 November 1944, VF-80 destroyed Japanese shipping in the vicinity of Manila; attacked targets on Zablan, Clark and Pasig airfields; and otherwise flew anti-sub and CAP patrols to protect the task group. At this point in the war the carriers were facing significantly less air opposition—certainly less than Vorse had been accustomed to during his time with VFs 2, 3 and 6. Japan's experienced aviators were dwindling, as were its carriers, which it guarded jealously for the final conflict. Even if these resources were available, the American re-capture of the Philippines effectively cut off Japan from much-needed oil.

Ticonderoga returned to Ulithi to regroup. She joined TG 38.2, which struck the coast of Luzon on 25 November. On that day Vorse spotted the primary objective of the raid, the cruiser Kumano, which CVG-80 torpedoed, bombed and ultimately sank in Dasol Bay. 25 November would be remembered by the task group less for successful completion of its mission than for the extreme kamikaze activity of the day: Essex, Intrepid, Hancock and Cabot were al hit by kamikazes. Not a single carrier was sunk, but over 100 men perished.

Ticonderoga retired to Ulithi for the holidays, departing from off Luzon. During this time VF-80 drilled and maintained battle readiness for the upcoming strikes against Formosa and the Sakishima Islands, which kicked off in the predawn hours of 3 January. Airfields, shipping, sugar refineries and aluminum plants were some of the main targets. Vorse is mentioned again in the squadron history on 12 January, when VF-80 flew a record 144 sorties and sunk an estimated 51,000 tons worth of escorts, oilers and merchant vessels. According to the record he flew three times that day and gave "Jap shipping a very unfriendly time."

On 15 January at around 0800 hours, Vorse led a contingent of 8 fighters and 13 bombers against shipping off Formosa. Despite bad weather and heavy enemy anti-aircraft fire, Vorse delivered a direct masthead hit on a destroyer from 200 feet (61 m). In the process almost 7 feet (2.1 m) of Vorse's left wing were shot off by enemy fire, forcing an emergency water landing at speeds of 160 knots (300 km/h; 180 mph), putting his fighter down in the water without suffering injury. For the above actions, Vorse was awarded the Navy Cross. It was also the fourth time up to that point that Vorse was forced to execute a water landing.

Vorse would not stay with Ticonderoga much longer. A week later, 21 January, two kamikaze pilots dove headlong into Ticonderoga. She was forced to limp her way back to Ulithi and debarked CVG-80 on 27 January, sending Vorse and his Vipers to Hancock. This was the fifth carrier he'd call home; Ticonderoga had been the third of these he left due to battle damage.

VF-80 first saw serious action aboard Hancock on 16–17 February 1945 as the US fleet approached the Japanese mainland 30 miles east of Honshu. They had the element of surprise and took full advantage of that fact, launching strikes against airfields and military installations on the ground. Strafing these targets quickly took a backseat to aerial combat when the Japanese arrived to contest the attacks on the homeland, providing more than enough excitement to make up for previous months of quiet CAP flights. Indeed, 16 February would mark a career high score for Vorse, who downed four in the air (2 Zeros, 1 Val and 1 Dinah) and accounted for two on the ground, and a squadron record that stands to this day: 71 aircraft destroyed.

The air group supported landings at the Battle of Iwo Jima from 21 to 22 February. Vorse led a raid on a seaplane base at Koniya, a town on the island of Amami Ōshima, on 1 March. Anti-aircraft fire was intense, with four Hellcats shot up during the flight, including Vorse's, which exhibited a foot-long gash in its left wing. The next day Hancock steamed for Ulithi to drop VF-80 off for rehabilitation leave. When the air group returned to action in May, Comdr. James Wright took over as CAG and P.D. Fleming led the fighter contingent.

== Awards and decorations ==
Vorse received the following decorations:

- Navy Cross
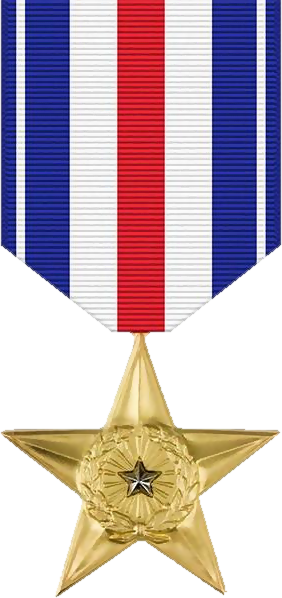
- Silver Star
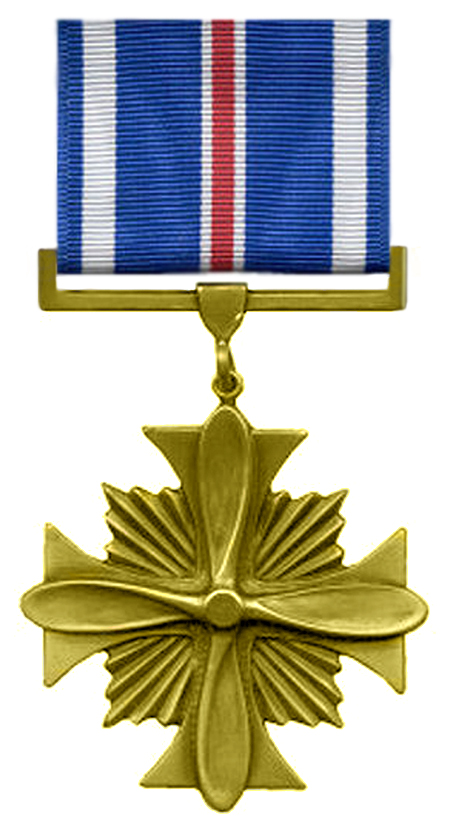
- Distinguished Flying Cross with one Gold Star
