= Cornelius N. Nooy =

American fighter ace

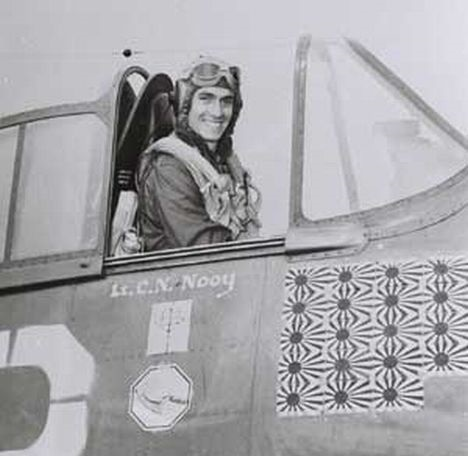
- Cornelius Nooy in his Hellcat, c. July 1945
- Born: April 15, 1921; Smithtown, New York
- Died: March 12, 1958 (aged 36); New York City, New York
- Burial place: North Branch Reformed Church Cemetery; Somerset County, New Jersey
- Military career
- Allegiance: United States
- Branch: United States Navy
- Service years: 1942–1958
- Rank: Lieutenant commander
- Nickname: "Connie"
- Units: USS Cabot; USS Belleau Wood
- Conflicts: World War II: Gilbert and Marshall Islands campaign; Operation Hailstone; Mariana and Palau Islands campaign; Battle of the Philippine Sea; Philippines Campaign; Battle of Leyte Gulf; Volcano and Ryukyu Islands campaign; Battle of Okinawa
- Awards: Navy Cross (3); Silver Star (2); Distinguished Flying Cross (2); Air Medal (6); Purple Heart

Cornelius Nicholas Nooy (April 15, 1921 – March 12, 1958) was a United States Navy flying ace of World War II. Nooy ended the war as the highest-scoring fighter pilot operating from a light aircraft carrier (CVL), and tied for fourth-highest-scoring ace in the US Navy (with Patrick D. Fleming and Alexander Vraciu). Nooy served two tours with VF-31's "Flying Meataxers" aboard USS Cabot and USS Belleau Wood. The first of these tours set a record for kills by a CVL fighter squadron.

== Early life ==
Nooy was born in Smithtown, New York, on April 15, 1921. He graduated from Smith Island High School and from the Long Island Institute of Applied Agriculture.

== World War II ==
Nooy enrolled in the US Navy's Aviation Cadet Program on 18 March 1942 and was quickly sent to the Naval Reserve Aviation Base in New Orleans, LA. He earned his wings on 15 January 1943 and was subsequently attached to Fighting Squadron 31 (VF-31) "Flying Meataxes", the outfit he'd stick with throughout the duration of the war.

=== VF-31 ===
VF-31 was officially established May 1943 and underwent unit training until August 1943, when it was attached to USS Cabot. The ship had its shakedown cruise September – October 1943 before transiting the Panama Canal on 13 November 1943, headed for Pearl Harbor. Cabot arrived at Pearl on 27 November. By January Cabot was again in motion, now attached to Rear Admiral Alfred E. Montgomery's Task Group 58.2 as part of Marc Mitscher's Fast Carrier Task Force. Their first strikes, launched in January, would be the opening salvo of Operation Flintlock in the Marshall Islands campaign.

==== January 1944 ====
VF-31 got their first taste of combat on 29 January during a dawn combat air patrol (CAP) mission over the islands of Roi and Namur. Nooy was slotted into position as wingman to squadron leader LCDR Winston, as would become the norm. Though Winston led his fliers off Cabot, the air coordinator for the task group was broadcasting from USS Essex and had the final say as to the position of the divisions. Given the weather that day—with stratus clouds enclosing the target area significantly reducing visibility at low altitude—the air coordinator ordered a last-second change in formation for the Meataxers. Rather than two divisions flying together with one division top cover, the three divisions were split out at 5,000, 10,000 and 15,000 feet.

Winston's division flew lowest, where the murk of clouds led to the worst visibility. As a result, Winston, Nooy, Wilson and Hancock shadowed a group of aircraft they expected to escort to the strike zone, only to discover at the last second that they were following on the heels of Japanese Zeros. Winston opened up on the surprised enemy fighters first and started a fracas that broke his division out into weaving sections. The Thach Weave worked well for Winston and Nooy, who each claimed a probable by knocking an enemy from their section mate's tail on the first exchange. Winston earned a confirmed kill on the second weave. With a lull in the action, Winston and Nooy slipped out towards a predetermined meet-up point at Point William but were jumped en route. Nooy spotted the Zeke nipping at their heels and attempted to alert Winston, but his radio was out and he didn't sense the danger. Winston only understood the gravity of his situation when tracers whipped past and bullets tore through his wings. The two successfully ran from their tail to the meet up point, Winston's plane still in fighting shape.

Once at Point William they met other friendly fliers and put together seven planes for another circuit over the target area. Winston, still at the tip of the spear, now led his men cruising at 8,000 feet, above the clouds and under the bright pacific sun. A first duo of Zeros came at the group head on from above. Scales (a VF-31 fighter who had joined up at Point William) raked one across its belly, but it was not enough to destroy the enemy. It was, however, enough that the interceptors split off and the Hellcats proceeded further into the target zone. Two Zeros were spotted further ahead, this time pursued by the Hellcats. Winston hit one from 8 o'clock causing it to dive off in desperation. Scales did not miss his second chance at a score and quickly finished the wounded bandit off. Winston continued charging, angling for the head Zero—apparently undaunted by his Hellcat's earlier holing. He scored hits in the center mass of the plane and knocked off its left flap. Nooy played vulture this time, pursuing the fleeing Japanese aircraft until his machine guns set it ablaze. The Zero was later seen to crash, giving Nooy his first confirmed kill.

==== February–March ====
The first few days of February saw Cabot launching more CAP and anti-submarine patrols in support of the Marine landings at Roi and Namur before the ship headed to recently-captured Majuro to regroup. By the afternoon of 12 February, Cabot and the rest of Task Group 58.2 were once again underway, headed to fleet up with Task Groups 58.1 and 58.3 in anticipation of Operation Hailstone. During this assault on Truk, VF-31 flew over the task group as an intercept force, otherwise combing the waves for signs of subs. The fighter squadron was getting fed up with their lot flying predominately CAPs and ASPs: they wanted bomber escort and strike mission assignments typically handed out to the larger aircraft carriers like USS Essex or USS Intrepid. That would have to wait, however. After a nighttime torpedo attack on 17 February severely damaged Intrepid, Cabot was assigned to escort her back towards Pearl. The light carrier returned to the task group and by mid-March was headed back to the Marshalls.

Nooy's next opportunity arose on 30 March during another CAP sortie in the vicinity of Palau. Unlike at Truk, when the fast carrier force achieved surprise and Japanese air forces could not muster a forceful counter-attack, the enemy knew that the Americans were coming. Japanese planes were already airborne when VF-31 began to take flight. Nooy's division was vectored to investigate radar contacts 50 miles out—what turned out to be almost a dozen Judy dive bombers headed for reprisal against American carriers. Nooy was the first to see the bandits. Tallyhoing his group, Nooy led the way in from above. It was not to be a long, running engagement as before. Instead, his .50 caliber guns raked through the first enemy's engine leaving it wreathed in flames. Nooy continued to fight vertically, climbing and diving three more times on three separate enemy aircraft. On the second and third runs his quarry smoked and broke ranks, but did not burn. Nooy was determined to finally seal the deal on his fourth pass. He clung to the "Judy" after his first pass, unleashing short bursts that were visibly wrecking the bomber as he chased it lower and lower. It finally caught fire at the wing root and slammed into the water below. Nooy was credited victories against the first and fourth pilots he fought, bringing his total score to three.

==== April–June ====
In early April Cabot refueled and returned to anchorage at Majuro, spending a week and a half there before again departing for the next TG 58.2 mission, Operation Desecrate-2. On 13 April Cabot steamed out of the atoll to engage in training exercises en route to the Hollandia area. By 19 April the ship was close enough to the combat zone to see anti-aircraft fire on the horizon. Cabot arrived on 21 April, launching strikes north of New Guinea designed to suppress Japanese air power in advance of U.S. Marine landings. After providing support for the operation, largely consisting of CAP/ASP missions over the task group, Cabot retired to refuel and re-supply in late April. The closing days of the month, along with 1 May, the task group renewed attacks on the previously battered Truk. On 30 April Nooy and Winston dropped bombs on Dublon Island that struck barracks, setting them on fire. VF-31 flew predominately as high cover for VT-31 on their bombing missions; Cabot's air group often flew alongside Air Group 5 of USS Yorktown during these strikes.

Almost the entire month of May was spent either at anchorage in Majuro or in the vicinity, engaging in gunnery practice (in the case of the ship), fighter director operation and other integral aspects of air group command.

By 6 June Cabot was headed out of Majuro, continuing exercises as it steamed towards Eniwetok for refueling. It did not stop long. Operation Forager was about to get underway. After the initial phase of operations consisting of fighter sweeps and bomber runs on Saipan, Rota and Guam, the Japanese contested American ambitions in the Marianas, leading to the Battle of the Philippine Sea between 19—20 June. The outcome would be disastrous for the Imperial Japanese Navy. Contributing its fair share to breaking the back of Japanese naval aviation, VF-31 claimed 28 destroyed and more probably destroyed or damaged. Up to this point in its tour, VF-31 claimed 113 enemy planes destroyed or damaged without a single loss of squadron personnel. Though he did not score a confirmed kill in June, Nooy played his part in this battle and is mentioned in a 20 June aircraft action report. During his division's CAP assignment, each of the four fighters holed an enemy "Betty" bomber with Wilson leading and probably killing its pilot before the other three took passes on the plane. Nooy's run helped start fires on the plane that were snuffed out by the sea in short order. Over the next few days, further strikes would rain down on Pagan Island before Cabot retired back to Eniwetok for the remainder of the month.

==== July–September ====
The Meataxers' next saw action at Iwo Jima. Following on the heels of the surprise attacks launched by Joseph J. Clark's TG 58.1, Cabot's fighter squadron flew top cover for the first TG 58.2 fighter sweep early on 4 July. Hellcats from USS Franklin and USS Wasp strafed airstrips and barracks in an attempt to nullify any possible aerial counterattack, also silencing anti-aircraft fire for the impending bomber strike. Meanwhile, the three divisions from Cabot were holding at 15,000 feet above the target area, watching the mayhem unfold below while they waited for retaliation from above. Japanese fighters arrived on the scene fifteen minutes later with a 3,000-foot altitude advantage. Nooy was flying wing on Wallace, the VF-31 strike leader and point man in the first of its three divisions. His division was the first to nose up into the Zekes, who Split S'ed away from the incoming Americans. Nooy fired at the extreme range of his guns while he chased the Zekes down but remarkably scored fatal hits on both of his targets. One enemy pilot bailed out. The other never had a chance. Just as soon as he had climbed back to altitude, Nooy spotted a Hellcat almost at sea level being hotly pursued by an enemy. He once more pushed his plane down, turning pursuer into pursued. He splashed this third Zero of the day with little difficulty. Nooy's fourth and final confirmed kill on the 4th was part of a team effort with a fighter from Wasp. They pounced on a Zero rapidly losing altitude as it sought to extract itself from the melee. Nooy is recorded as scoring hits from all angles, all over the doomed aircraft. He and the Wasp pilot went on to maul another enemy together, and Nooy probably destroyed yet another fighter later while he escorted a damaged friendly back to the carriers. Overall, the fighter squadrons from Wasp and Cabot each claimed over a dozen enemies shot down with only a handful of losses between them.

=== Aerial victories ===
Date	Type	Total	Location
29 January 1944	Mitsubishi A6M "Zeke" (or "Zero")	1	Kwajalein
30 March 1944	Yokosuka D4Y "Judy"	2	Palau
4 July 1944	Mitsubishi A6M	4	Iwo Jima
13 September 1944	Nakajima Ki-43 "Oscar"	3	Mindanao
21 September 1944	2 A6M, 2 Nakajima Ki-44 "Tojo", 1 Kawasaki Ki-61 "Tony"	5	Luzon
25 July 1945	Nakajima Ki-84 "Frank"	4	Yokkaichi airfield
		19	

== Post-war ==
After the war, Nooy moved back to New York and stayed with the U.S. Naval Reserves and was promoted to lieutenant commander in 1952. He was vice president of the American Partition Company and ran for political office in Branchburg, New Jersey, in 1954.

Cornelius Nooy died as a result of cancer on 12 March 1958. Nooy is buried at North Branch Reformed Church Cemetery in Somerset County, New Jersey.

== Awards and decorations ==
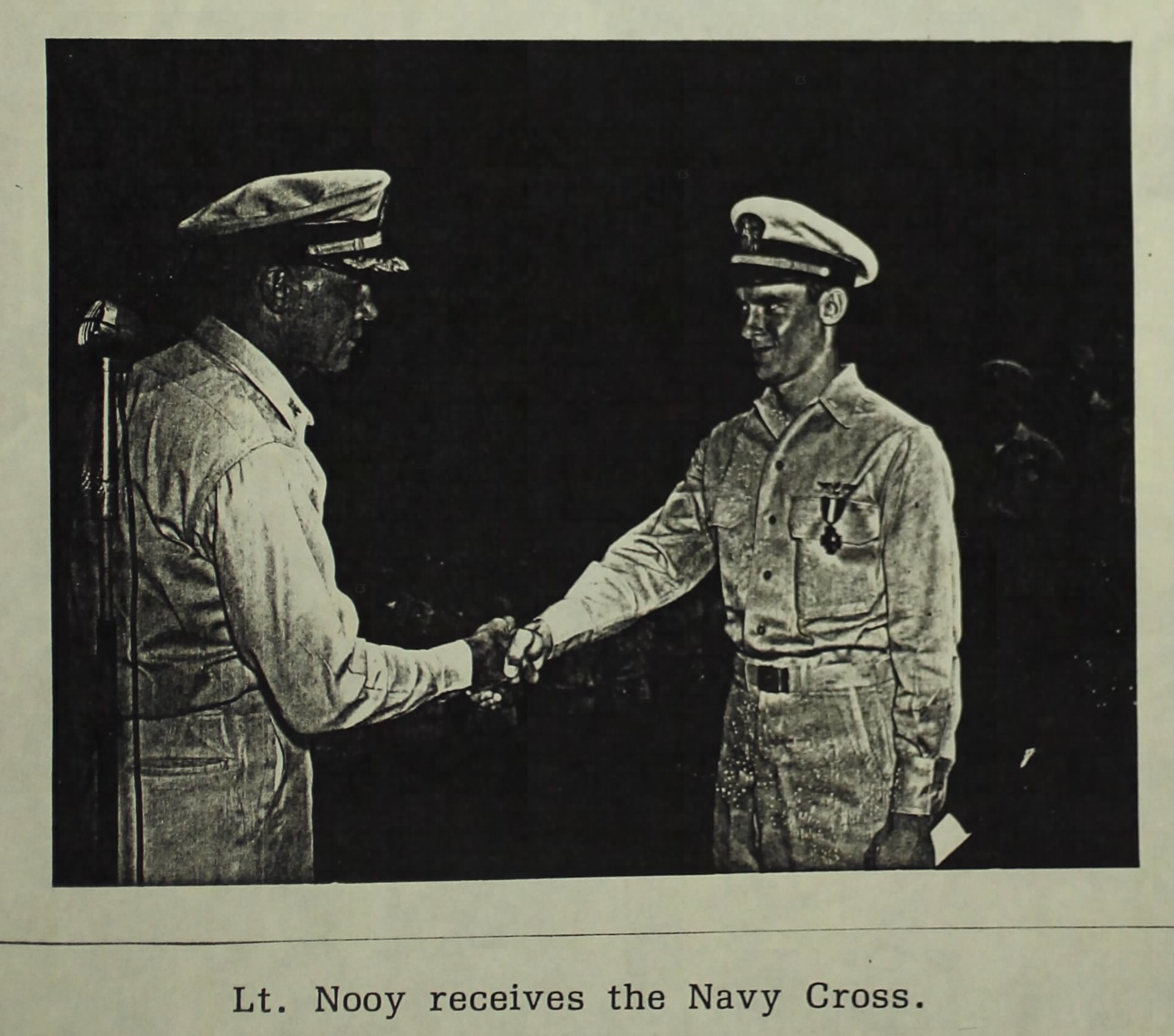
Nooy (right) after being presented with his Navy Cross in September 1944

Nooy received the following decorations:

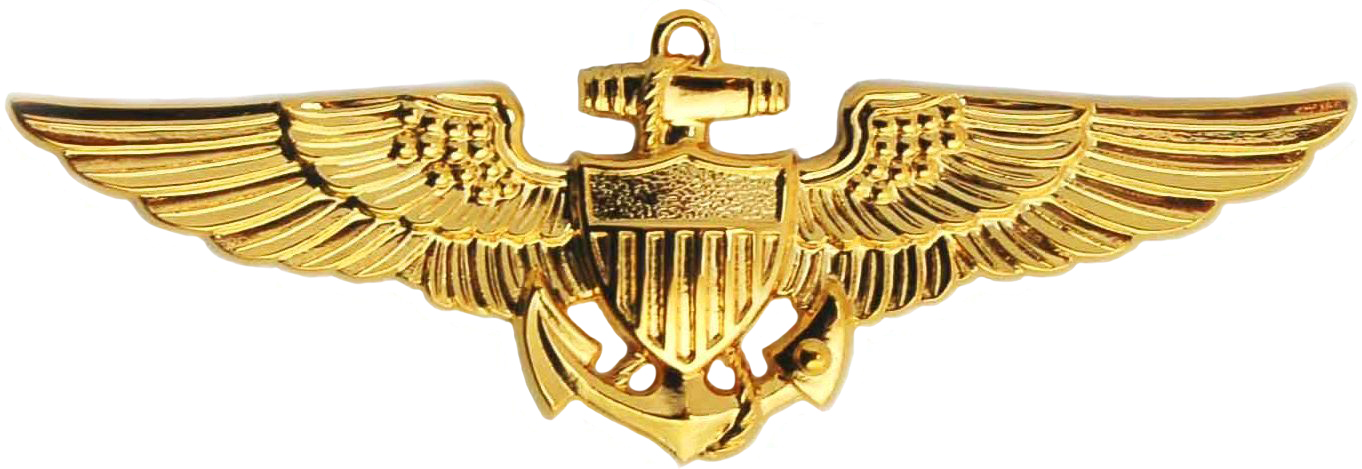

Naval Aviator Badge
Navy Cross w/ two 5/16" Gold Stars
Silver Star w/ one 5/16" Gold Star	Distinguished Flying Cross w/ one 5/16" Gold Star	Purple Heart
Air Medal w/ one 5/16" Silver Star	Combat Action Ribbon	Navy Presidential Unit Citation w/ one 3/16" bronze star
American Campaign Medal	Asiatic-Pacific Campaign Medal w/ one 3/16" silver star and two 3/16" bronze stars	World War II Victory Medal
Armed Forces Reserve Medal with bronze hourglass device	Philippine Presidential Unit Citation	Philippine Liberation Medal w/ two 3/16" bronze stars

=== 1st Navy Cross citation ===

Lieutenant Cornelius Nicholas Nooy
U.S. Navy
Date Of Action: July 4, 1944

The President of the United States of America takes pleasure in presenting the Navy Cross to Lieutenant [then Lieutenant, Junior Grade] Cornelius Nicholas Nooy, United States Naval Reserve, for extraordinary heroism in operations against the enemy while serving as Pilot of a carrier-based Navy Fighter Plane in Fighting Squadron THIRTY-ONE (VF-31), attached to the U.S.S. CABOT (CVL-28), in action against enemy Japanese Forces in the Pacific War Area, on 4 July 1944. Participating in the initial fighter sweep over the Japanese-controlled Bonin Islands, Lieutenant Nooy fought his plane gallantly against the enemy, dived from an altitude of ten thousand feet to destroy a hostile fighter which was attacking a friendly plane about fifty feet above the coast. During this same action Lieutenant Nooy shot down three other enemy aircraft and probably destroyed a fourth. By his fighting spirit, initiative and courage, Lieutenant Nooy contributed materially to the success of our operations in this area and upheld the highest traditions of the United States Naval Service.

=== 2nd Navy Cross citation ===

Lieutenant Cornelius Nicholas Nooy
U.S. Navy
Date Of Action: September 21, 1944

The President of the United States of America takes pleasure in presenting a Gold Star in lieu of a Second Award of the Navy Cross to Lieutenant [then Lieutenant, Junior Grade] Cornelius Nicholas Nooy, United States Naval Reserve, for extraordinary heroism in operations against the enemy while serving as Pilot of a carrier-based Navy Fighter Plane in Fighting Squadron THIRTY-ONE (VF-31), attached to the U.S.S. CABOT (CVL-28), in action against enemy Japanese forces in the vicinity of the Philippine Islands, on 21 September 1944. A daring and aggressive airman, Lieutenant Nooy gallantly led his section in a bold fighter sweep against a highly important and enemy-held airfield. Fighting his plane with skill and courage, he succeeded in shooting down five enemy planes with only minor damage to his own plane and later executed a bombing run which resulted in a direct hit on a Japanese hangar. By his superb airmanship, courageous fighting spirit, and unswerving devotion to duty, Lieutenant Nooy contributed substantially to the success of this vital operation, thereby reflecting the highest credit upon himself and the United States Naval Service.

=== 3rd Navy Cross citation ===

Lieutenant Cornelius Nicholas Nooy
U.S. Navy
Date Of Action: July 24, 1945

The President of the United States of America takes pleasure in presenting a Second Gold Star in lieu of a Third Award of the Navy Cross to Lieutenant [then Lieutenant, Junior Grade] Cornelius Nicholas Nooy, United States Naval Reserve, for extraordinary heroism in operations against the enemy while serving as Pilot of a carrier-based Navy Fighter Plane and Strike Leader in Fighting Squadron THIRTY-ONE (VF-31), attached to the U.S.S. BELLEAU WOOD (CVL-24), in action on 24 July 1945, while deployed over Kure, Japan. Leading his four-plane fighter strike against major units of the Japanese Fleet, Lieutenant Nooy braved intense anti-aircraft fire to press home a dive-bombing attack against the enemy battleship Ise and score a direct hit, thereby contributing to the final destruction of the hostile vessel. His expert airmanship, courage and devotion to duty were in keeping with the highest traditions of the United States Naval Service.
