= Bill Schoech =

William Alton Schoech (October 17, 1904 – January 26, 1982) was a vice admiral in the United States Navy.

Schoech was born October 17, 1904, near Blakesburg, Iowa. He entered the U. S. Naval Academy in 1924 and graduated with the rank of ensign in 1928.

During World War II he served as chief staff officer to Commander Aircraft, US Seventh Fleet.

His commands include the USS Sicily (CVE-118) and the USS Ticonderoga (CV-14). He served as the vice admiral of the United States Seventh Fleet from October 28, 1961, to October 13, 1962. In July 1963 he was appointed to be the Chief of Division of Material and he stayed there until 1965.

Schoech died January 26, 1982, in San Diego, California.
