= Dixie Kiefer =

United States Navy commodore (1896–1945)

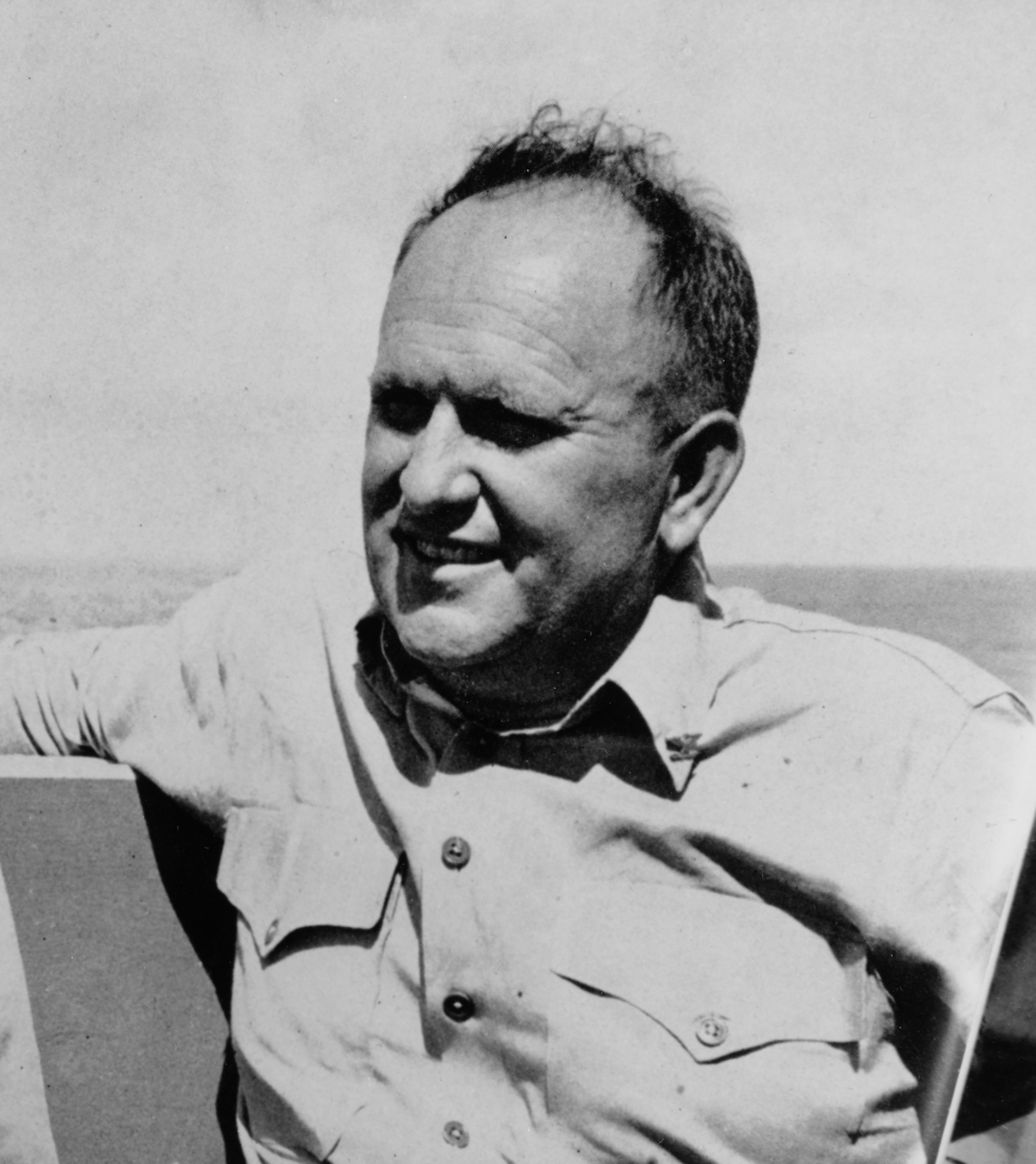
- Born: April 5, 1896; Blackfoot, Idaho, US
- Died: November 11, 1945 (aged 49); Mount Beacon, New York, US
- Burial place: Arlington National Cemetery
- Military career
- Allegiance: United States of America
- Branch: United States Navy
- Service years: 1917–1945
- Rank: Commodore
- Service number: 0-34685
- Commands: Naval Air Station Quonset Point; USS Ticonderoga
- Conflicts: World War I: North Sea Mine Barrage; World War II: Invasion of Salamaua–Lae; Battle of the Coral Sea; Battle of Midway; Philippines Campaign
- Awards: Navy Cross; Distinguished Service Medal; Silver Star; Purple Heart (2)

Dixie Kiefer (April 5, 1896 – November 11, 1945) was a United States Navy officer who served during World War II as executive officer of USS Yorktown and commanding officer of USS Ticonderoga. He was one of the Navy's best known figures during the war.

== Early life ==
Born in eastern Idaho at Blackfoot, Kiefer was the son of Mr. and Mrs. H. G. Kiefer and graduated from Lincoln High School in Lincoln, Nebraska. He entered the United States Naval Academy in 1915 and was commissioned in June 1918. His first assignment was USS Corona, a small anti-submarine patrol vessel operating in European waters during the last part of World War I.

== Naval aviator ==
In the 1920s, Kiefer became a pilot in the fledgling aviation branch of the Navy. On 11 November 1924, he made the first ever night take-off from a warship. His plane, a Vought UO-1, was launched by catapult from USS California in the harbor of San Diego. The only illumination was California's searchlights, directed 1,000 yards in the distance.

== World War II ==
By World War II, Kiefer had risen to the rank of commander. He served as Executive Officer of the aircraft carrier USS Yorktown (CV-5) in the Battles of Coral Sea and Midway, where he was credited with instilling high morale among the crew. He received the Distinguished Service Medal for Coral Sea and the Navy Cross for Midway. When Yorktown was sunk at Midway, Kiefer shattered his right leg and ankle while leaping from the ship.

After recovering from his injuries, Kiefer was promoted to captain and given command of the new carrier USS Ticonderoga (CV-14), which was commissioned at the Norfolk Navy Yard on 8 May 1944. He was popular with his sailors and was credited with training the carrier's air group and crew into an efficient wartime team. Reportedly, Kiefer would use the bullhorn 4-5 times a day to hurry his flight deck crew or else "that admiral over there will give me hell." Only one man deserted at San Diego. When the ship passed through the Panama Canal, Kiefer ensured that nearly the entire 3,000 crew received shore leave. The crew also had steak four nights in a row.

On 21 January 1945, Ticonderoga was hit by two Japanese kamikaze bombers. 144 men were killed and 200 injured. The first kamikaze hit started large fires among gasoline and planes in the hangar deck. Kiefer had port-side compartment deliberately flooded to put a 10-degree list on the ship. This caused the flaming gasoline to slide overboard – a procedure not used before. Then he maneuvered the ship to upwind of the burning wreckage. A second kamikaze hit Ticonderoga later that day. The explosion from that hit injured Kiefer, with 65 wounds from bomb shrapnel and a broken arm. Nonetheless he remained in command on the bridge for eleven hours, not leaving until it was reported that all of the other injured were treated.

While recovering from his injuries, Kiefer was made an honorary commodore in a ceremony at Rockefeller Center. He also served as commander of the Naval Air Station at Quonset, Rhode Island. He received the Distinguished Service Medal from Secretary of the Navy James V. Forrestal, who called him "the indestructible man".

He had not yet recovered when he died at age 49 on 11 November 1945 – his arm was still in a cast. He was killed in the crash of his Navy transport plane on Mount Beacon, New York, while returning to Quonset from Caldwell, New Jersey.

Kiefer was buried at Arlington National Cemetery in Arlington, Virginia.

Kiefer was said to be the most battered officer in the Navy. He broke his left ankle and split his kneecap playing football as a youth. His left elbow was smashed when a fellow pilot "buzzed" him in a seaplane and hit his arm with a wingtip float. The crew of Ticonderoga said of him, "He's got so much metal in him the ship's compass follows him when he walks across the deck."

== Awards and decorations ==

Badge	Naval Aviator insignia		
1st Row	Navy Cross		
2nd Row	Navy Distinguished Service Medal	Silver Star Medal	Purple Heart Medal with one 5/16" Gold Star
3rd Row	World War I Victory Medal	American Defense Service Medal	American Campaign Medal
4th Row	Asiatic-Pacific Campaign Medal with one silver and two bronze service stars	World War II Victory Medal	Philippine Liberation Medal with one star
