= VF-80 =

Fighter Squadron 80
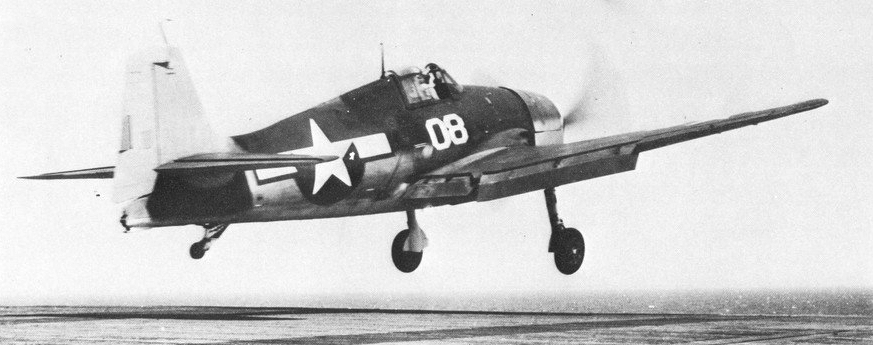
- VF-80 F6F launches from USS Ticonderoga in 1944
- Active: 1 February 1944 – 16 September 1946
- Country: United States
- Branch: United States Navy
- Type: Fighter
- Nickname(s): Vorse's Vipers
- Engagements: World War II

Aircraft flown
- Fighter: F6F-5 Hellcat

Fighter Squadron 80 or VF-80 was an aviation unit of the United States Navy. Originally established on 1 February 1944, it was disestablished on 16 September 1946. It was the first US Navy squadron to be designated VF-80.

== Operational history ==
VF-80 equipped with the F6F-5 Hellcat was assigned to Carrier Air Group 80 (CVG-80) on the USS Ticonderoga. From 5–14 November 1944, VF-80 attacked Japanese targets around the Philippines in support of the invasion of Leyte and conducted combat air patrols to protect the task group. Returning to action in late November, CVG-80 continued to hit targets in the Philippines until Ticonderoga retired to Ulithi for the Christmas holidays.

In early January 1945, CVG-80 struck airfields, shipping and industrial targets on Formosa and the Sakishima Islands in support of the invasion of Lingayen Gulf. On 21 January, Ticonderoga was hit by two Kamikazes and retired to Ulithi where CVG-80 was offloaded and VF-80 assigned to the USS Hancock.

On 16 February 1945, VF-80 participated in strikes against airfields and military installations on Honshu, also shooting down 71 Japanese aircraft—a single day record for carrier-based squadrons. VF-80 supported the invasion of Iwo Jima from 21 February and hit other Japanese targets until early March when it was relieved and returned to Ulithi.

== See also ==
- History of the United States Navy
- List of inactive United States Navy aircraft squadrons
- List of United States Navy aircraft squadrons
