= USS Ticonderoga (CV-14) =

Essex-class aircraft carrier of the US Navy

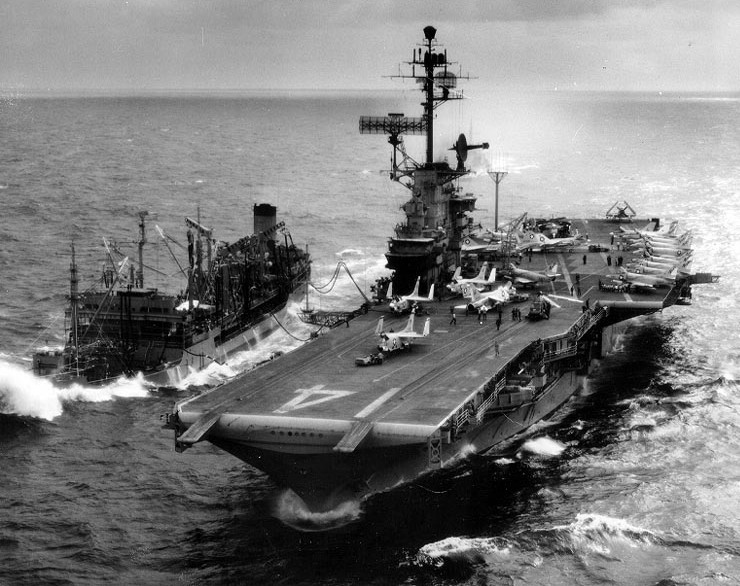
- USS Ticonderoga refueling off the coast of Vietnam in 1966

History

United States
- Name: Ticonderoga
- Namesake: Battle of Ticonderoga
- Builder: Newport News Shipbuilding
- Laid down: 1 February 1943
- Launched: 7 February 1944
- Commissioned: 8 May 1944
- Decommissioned: 9 January 1947
- Recommissioned: 1 October 1954
- Decommissioned: 1 September 1973
- Reclassified: CVA-14, 1 October 1952; CVS-14, 21 October 1969
- Stricken: 16 November 1973
- Fate: Scrapped, 15 August 1974

General characteristics
- Class & type: Essex-class aircraft carrier
- Displacement: 27,100 long tons (27,500 t) standard
- Length: 888 feet (271 m) overall
- Beam: 93 feet (28 m)
- Draft: 28 feet 7 inches (8.71 m)
- Installed power: 8 × boilers; 150,000 shp (110 MW)
- Propulsion: 4 × geared steam turbines; 4 × shafts
- Speed: 33 knots (61 km/h; 38 mph)
- Complement: 3448 officers and enlisted
- Armament: 12 × 5 inch (127 mm)/38 caliber guns; 32 × Bofors 40 mm guns; 46 × Oerlikon 20 mm cannons
- Armor: Belt: 4 in (102 mm); Hangar deck: 2.5 in (64 mm); Deck: 1.5 in (38 mm); Conning tower: 1.5 inch
- Aircraft carried: 90–100 aircraft

USS Ticonderoga (CV/CVA/CVS-14) was one of 24 Essex-class aircraft carriers built during and after World War II for the United States Navy. The ship was the fourth US Navy ship to bear the name, and was named after the capture of Fort Ticonderoga in the American Revolutionary War. Ticonderoga was commissioned in May 1944, and served in several campaigns in the Pacific Theater of Operations, earning five battle stars. Decommissioned shortly after the end of the war, she was modernized and recommissioned in the early 1950s as an attack carrier (CVA), and then eventually became an antisubmarine carrier (CVS). She was recommissioned too late to participate in the Korean War, but was very active in the Vietnam War, earning three Navy Unit Commendations, one Meritorious Unit Commendation, and 12 battle stars.

Ticonderoga differed somewhat from the earlier Essex-class ships in that she was 16 ft (4.9 m) longer to accommodate bow-mounted anti-aircraft guns. Most subsequent Essex-class carriers were completed to this "long-hull" design and were referred to as the Ticonderoga class. At the end of her career, after a number of modifications, she was said to be in the Hancock class according to the Naval vessel register.

Ticonderoga was decommissioned in 1973 and sold for scrap in 1975.

== Construction and commissioning ==
The ship was laid down as Hancock on 1 February 1943 at Newport News, Virginia, by the Newport News Shipbuilding & Dry Dock Co., renamed Ticonderoga on 1 May 1943, and launched on 7 February 1944, sponsored by Miss Stephanie Sarah Pell. She was commissioned at the Norfolk Navy Yard on 8 May 1944, Captain Dixie Kiefer in command.

== Service history ==
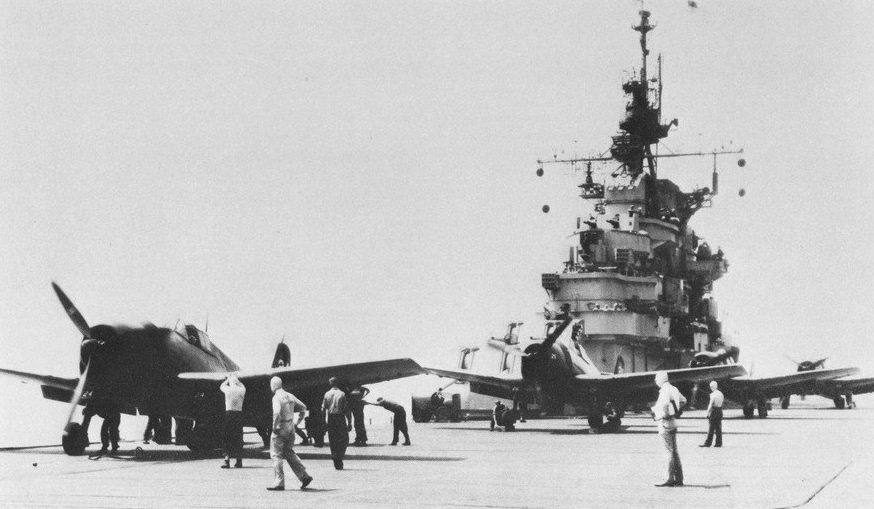
F6F Hellcats of VF-80 on Ticonderoga in June 1944

Ticonderoga remained at Norfolk for almost two months outfitting and embarking Air Group 80. On 26 June 1944, the carrier shaped a course for the British West Indies. She conducted air operations and drills en route and reached Port of Spain, Trinidad, on 30 June. For the next 15 days, Ticonderoga trained intensively to weld her air group and crew into an efficient wartime team. She departed the West Indies on 16 July and headed back to Norfolk where she arrived on 22 July for post-shakedown repairs and alterations. On 30 August, the carrier headed for Panama. She transited the Panama Canal on 4 September and steamed up the coast to Naval Base San Diego the following day. On 13 September, the carrier moored at San Diego where she loaded provisions, fuel, aviation gas, and an additional 77 aircraft, as well as the Marine Corps aviation and defense units that went with them. On 19 September, she steamed for Hawaii where she arrived five days later.

Ticonderoga remained at Pearl Harbor for almost a month. She and Carina conducted experiments in the underway transfer of aviation bombs from cargo ship to aircraft carrier. Following those tests, she conducted air operations – day and night landing and antiaircraft defense drills – until 18 October, when she exited Pearl Harbor and headed for the western Pacific. After a brief stop at Eniwetok, Ticonderoga arrived at Ulithi in the Western Caroline Islands on 29 October. There she embarked Rear Admiral Arthur W. Radford, Commander, Carrier Division 6, and joined Task Force 38 (TF 38) as a unit of Rear Admiral Frederick C. Sherman's Task Group 38.3 (TG 38.3).

=== World War II ===
==== Philippine campaign ====
The carrier sortied from Ulithi with TF 38 on 2 November 1944. She joined the other carriers as they resumed their extended air cover for the ground forces supporting the Battle of Leyte. She launched her first air strike on the morning of 5 November. The aircraft of her air group spent the next two days pummeling enemy shipping near Luzon and air installations on that island. Her aircraft bombed and strafed the airfields at Zablan, Mandaluyong, and Pasig. They also joined those of other carriers in sinking the heavy cruiser Nachi. In addition, Ticonderoga pilots claimed six Japanese aircraft shot down and one destroyed on the ground, as well as 23 others damaged.

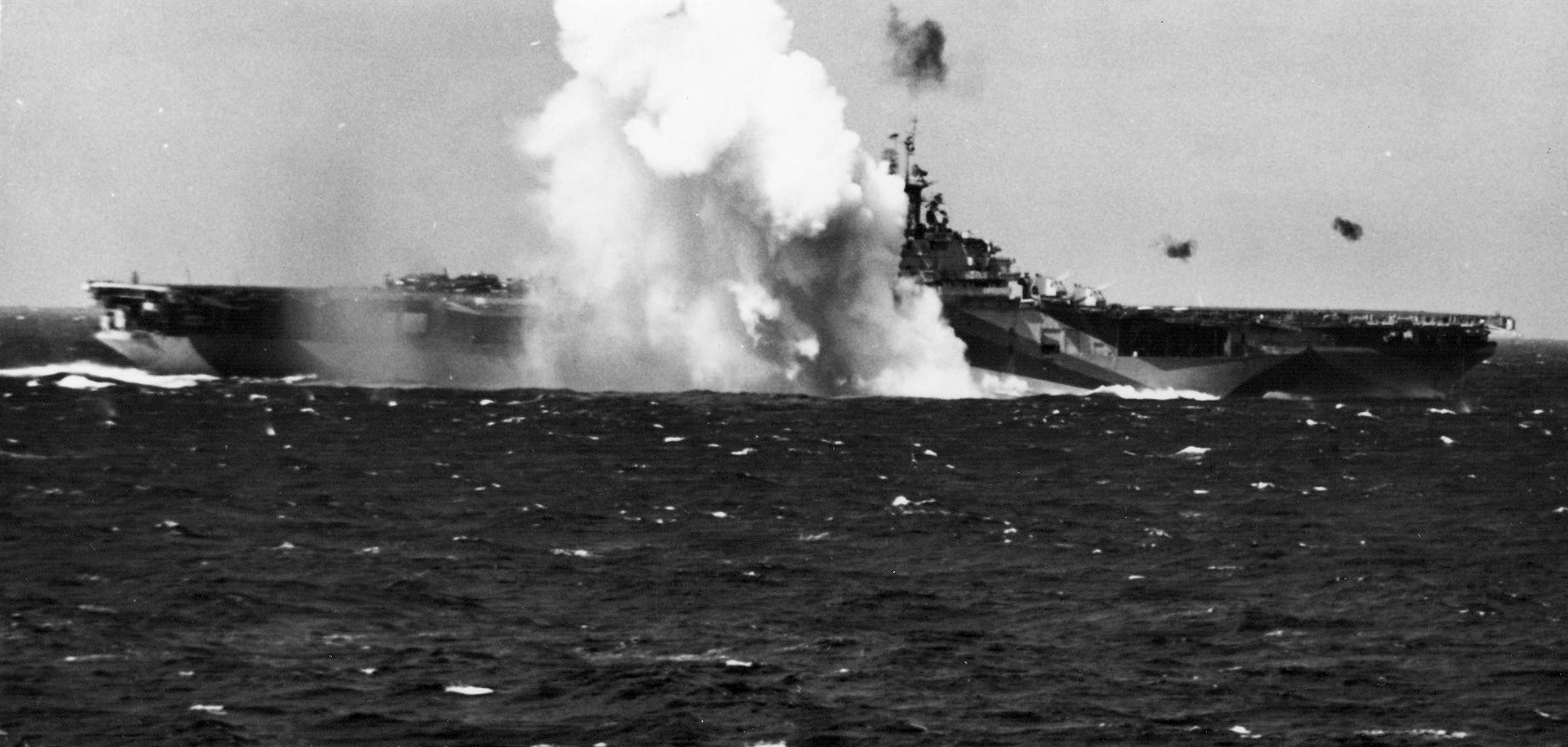
Kamikaze crashes near Ticonderoga in 1944

Around 16:00 on 5 November, the enemy attacked with a group of kamikaze aircraft. Two of the suicide aircraft penetrated the American combat air patrol and antiaircraft fire to crash into the aircraft carrier Lexington. Ticonderoga emerged from that attack unscathed and claimed a tally of two splashes. On 6 November, the warship launched two fighter sweeps and two bombing strikes against the Luzon airfields and enemy shipping in the vicinity. Her airmen returned later that day claiming the destruction of 35 Japanese aircraft and attacks on six enemy ships in Manila Bay. After recovering her aircraft, the carrier retired to the east to resupply.

She refueled and received replacement aircraft on 7 November and then headed back to continue operating against enemy forces in the Philippines. Early on the morning of 11 November, her aircraft combined with others of TF 38 to attack a Japanese reinforcement convoy, just as it was preparing to enter Ormoc Bay from the Camotes Sea. Together, the aircraft accounted for all the enemy transports and four of the seven escorting destroyers. On 12–13 November, Ticonderoga and her sister ships launched strikes at Luzon airfields and docks and shipping around Manila. This raid destroyed the light cruiser Kiso, four destroyers, and seven merchant ships. At the conclusion of the raid, TF 38 retired eastward for refueling. Ticonderoga and the rest of TG 38.3, however, continued east to Ulithi where they arrived on 17 November to replenish, refuel, and rearm.

On 22 November, the aircraft carrier departed Ulithi once more and steamed back toward the Philippines. Three days later, she launched air strikes on central Luzon and adjacent waters. Her pilots sank the heavy cruiser Kumano, previously damaged in the Battle off Samar. Later, they attacked an enemy convoy about 15 miles (24 km) southwest of Kumano in Dasol Bay. Of this convoy, cruiser Yasoshima, a merchantman, and three landing ships were sunk. Ticonderoga's air group ended their day of destruction with an aerial battle which cost the Japanese 15 aircraft shot down and 11 destroyed on the ground.

While her air group fought the Japanese, Ticonderoga's shipboard crew also went into action. Just after noon, a torpedo launched by an enemy aircraft broached in the wake of the light aircraft carrier Langley, announcing the approach of an enemy air raid. Ticonderoga's gunners manned their battle stations defending against both conventional and suicide attacks on the task group. Her sister ship Essex was set afire when one of the kamikazes crashed into her. When a second suicide aircraft tried to attack the stricken carrier, Ticonderoga's gunners joined those firing from other ships in shooting it down. That afternoon, while damage control parties worked on Essex, Ticonderoga recovered aircrew which the damaged Essex and Intrepid were unable to receive. The following day, TF 38 retired to the east.

TF 38 stood out of Ulithi again on 11 December and headed for the Philippines. Ticonderoga arrived at the launch point early in the afternoon of 13 December and sent her aircraft aloft to blanket Japanese airbases on Luzon while Army aircraft attacked those in the central Philippines. For three days, Ticonderoga airmen and their comrades launched airstrikes on enemy airfields. She withdrew on 16 December with the rest of TF 38 in search of a fueling rendezvous. While attempting to find calmer waters in which to refuel, TF 38 steamed directly through a violent, but unheralded, typhoon. Though the storm cost Admiral William Halsey's force three destroyers and over 800 lives, Ticonderoga and the other carriers managed to ride it out with a minimum of damage. Having survived the battle, Ticonderoga returned to Ulithi on 24 December.

Repairs occasioned by the typhoon kept TF 38 in the anchorage almost until the end of the month. The carriers did not return to sea until 30 December 1944 when they steamed north to hit Formosa and Luzon in preparation for the landings on the latter island at Lingayen Gulf. Severe weather limited the Formosa strikes on 3–4 January 1945 but also hampered enemy operations. The warships fueled at sea on 5 January. Despite rough weather on 6 January, the strikes on Luzon airfields were carried out. That day, Ticonderoga's airmen and their colleagues of the other air groups increased their score by another 32 enemy aircraft. 7 January brought more strikes on Luzon installations. After a fueling rendezvous on 8 January, Ticonderoga sped north at night to get into position to blanket Japanese airfields in the Ryūkyūs during the Lingayen assault the following morning. However, foul weather, the bugaboo of TF 38 during the winter of 1944 and 1945, forced TG 38.3 to abandon the strikes on the Ryūkyū airfields and join TG 38.2 in pounding Formosa.

==== South China Sea combat ====
During the night of 9–10 January, TF 38 steamed through the Luzon Strait and then headed generally southwest, diagonally across the South China Sea. Ticonderoga provided combat air patrol coverage on 11 January and helped to bring down four enemy aircraft which attempted to snoop the formation. Otherwise, the carriers and their consorts proceeded uneventfully to a point some 150 to 200 mi (240 to 320 km) off the coast of Indochina. There, on 12 January, they launched their approximately 850 aircraft and made a series of anti-shipping sweeps during which they sank 44 ships, totaling over 300,000 long tons (300,000 t).

After recovering aircraft in the late afternoon, the carriers moved off to the northeast. Heavy weather hindered fueling operations on the 13th–14th and air reconnaissance failed to detect any worthwhile targets. On 15 January, fighters raided Japanese airfields on the Chinese coast while the carriers headed for a position from which to strike Hong Kong. The following morning, they launched anti-shipping bombing raids and fighter sweeps of air installations. Weather prevented air operations on 17 January and again made fueling difficult. It worsened the next day and stopped replenishment operations altogether, so that they were not finally concluded until 19 January. The force then took a course generally northward to retransit Luzon Strait via Balintang Channel.

==== Attacks on South Japanese islands ====
The three task groups of TF 38 completed their transit during the night of 20–21 January. The next morning, aided by favorable flight conditions, their aircraft hit airfields on Formosa, in the Pescadores, and at Sakishima Gunto. While it allowed American flight operations to continue through the day, it also allowed for Japanese kamikaze operations.

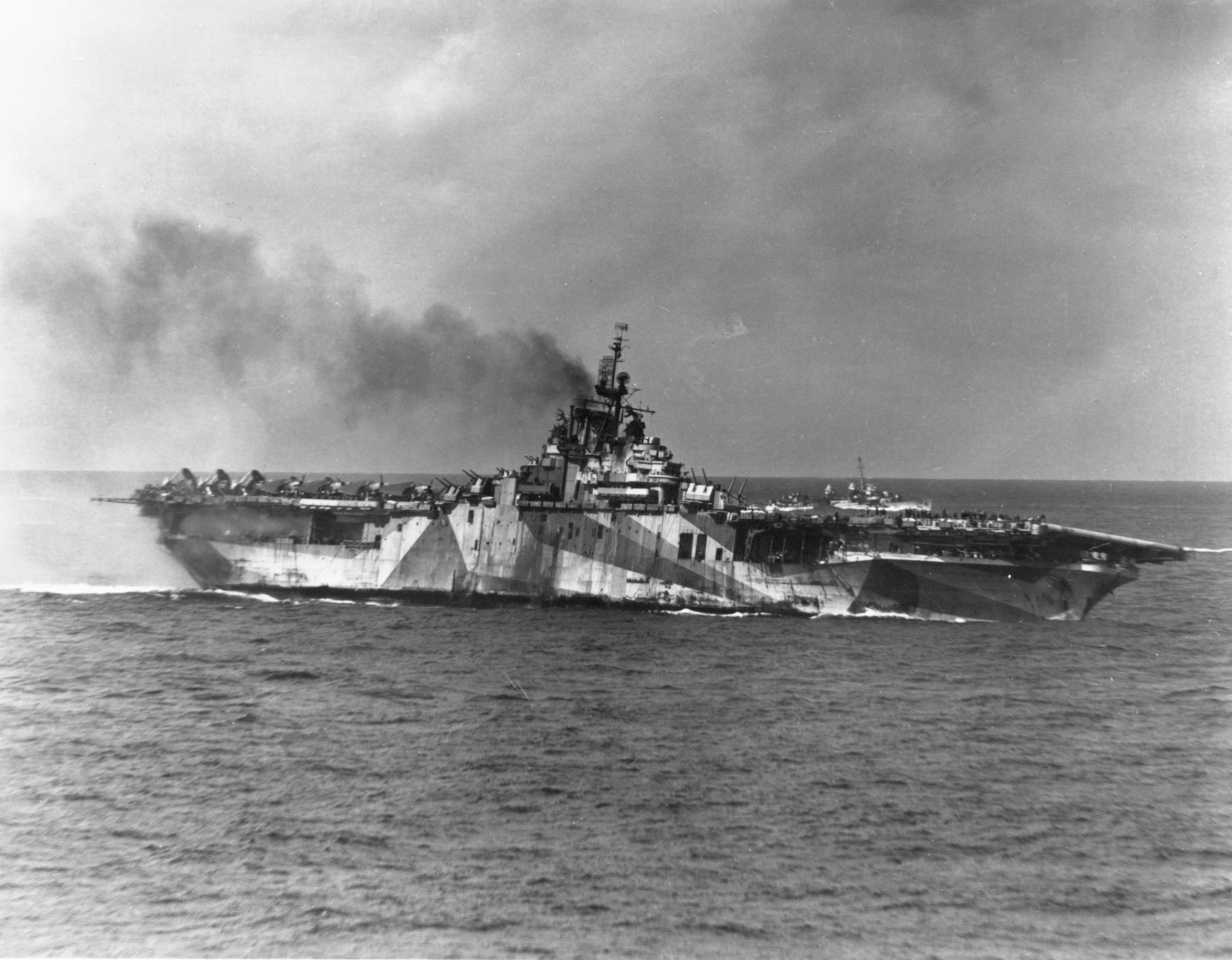
Ticonderoga listing after kamikaze attacks, 21 January 1945.

Just after noon, a single-engine Japanese aircraft scored a hit on Langley with a glide-bombing attack. Seconds later, a kamikaze swooped out of the clouds and plunged toward Ticonderoga. The aircraft crashed through the ship's flight deck abreast of the No. 2 5 in (127mm) mount, and its bomb exploded just above her hangar deck. Several aircraft stowed nearby erupted into flames and men were killed. While the crew were ordered into action to save the endangered carrier, Captain Kiefer conned his ship skillfully. First, he changed course to keep the wind from fanning the blaze. Then, he ordered magazines and other compartments flooded to prevent further explosions and to correct a 10° starboard list. Finally, he instructed the damage control party to continue flooding compartments on Ticonderoga's port side which induced a 10° port list which dumped the fire overboard. Firefighters and aircraft handlers completed the dangerous job of dousing the flames and jettisoning burning aircraft.

Other kamikaze then assailed the carrier. Her antiaircraft gunners shot down three which all crashed into the sea, but a fourth aircraft struck the carrier's starboard side near the island. Its bomb set more aircraft on fire, riddled her flight deck, and injured or killed another 100 sailors, with Captain Kiefer one of the wounded. Ticonderoga's crew continued their efforts and were spared further attacks. They brought her fires completely under control not long after 1400, and Ticonderoga retired.

==== Repair and relaunch ====
The stricken carrier arrived at Ulithi on 24 January but remained there only long enough to move her wounded to hospital ship Samaritan, to transfer her air group to Hancock, and to embark passengers bound for home. Ticonderoga cleared the lagoon on 28 January and headed for the U.S. The warship stopped briefly at Pearl Harbor en route to the Puget Sound Navy Yard where she arrived on 15 February. Captain William Sinton assumed command in February 1945.

Her repairs were completed on 20 April, and she cleared Puget Sound the following day for the Alameda Naval Air Station, Alameda, California. After embarking passengers and aircraft bound for Hawaii, the carrier headed for Pearl Harbor where she arrived on 1 May. The next day, Air Group 87 came on board and, for the next week, trained in preparation for the carrier's return to combat. Ticonderoga stood out of Pearl Harbor and shaped a course for the western Pacific. En route to Ulithi, on 17 May, she launched her aircraft for what amounted to training strikes on Japanese-held Taroa in the Marshalls. On 22 May, the warship arrived in Ulithi and rejoined the Fast Carrier Task Force as an element of Rear Admiral Radford's TG 58.4.

==== Preparing for the Japan campaign ====
Two days after her arrival, Ticonderoga sortied from Ulithi with TF 58 and headed north to spend the last weeks of the war in Japanese home waters. Three days out, Admiral Halsey relieved Admiral Raymond Spruance, the 5th Fleet reverted to 3rd Fleet, and TF 58 became TF 38 again for the duration. On 2–3 June, Ticonderoga fighters struck at airfields on Kyūshū in an effort to neutralize the remnants of Japanese air power – particularly the kamikaze – and to relieve the pressure on American forces at Okinawa. During the following two days, Ticonderoga rode out her second typhoon in less than six months and emerged relatively unscathed. She provided combat air patrol cover for 6 June refueling rendezvous, and four of her fighters intercepted and destroyed three Okinawa-bound kamikazes. That evening, she steamed off at high speed with TG 38.4 to conduct a fighter sweep of airfields on southern Kyūshū on 8 June. Ticonderoga's aircraft then joined in the aerial bombardment of Minami Daito and Kita Daito islands before the carrier headed for Leyte where she arrived on the 13th.

During the two-week rest and replenishment period she enjoyed at Leyte, Ticonderoga changed task organizations from TG 38.4 to Rear Admiral Gerald F. Bogan's TG 38.3. On 1 July, under the flag of Rear Admiral Clifton Sprague, she departed Leyte with TF 38 and headed north to resume raids on Japan. Two days later, a damaged reduction gear forced her into Apra Harbor, Guam, for repairs. She remained there until the 19th when she steamed off to rejoin TF 38. On the 24th, her aircraft joined those of other fast carriers in striking ships in the Inland Sea and airfields at Nagoya, Osaka, and Miko. During those raids, TF 38 aircraft found the sad remnants of the once-mighty Japanese Fleet and bagged battleships Ise, Hyūga, and Haruna as well as an escort carrier, Kaiyō, and two heavy cruisers. On 28 July, her aircraft directed their efforts toward the Kure Naval Base, where they pounded an aircraft carrier, three cruisers, a destroyer, and a submarine.

She shifted her attention to the industrial area of central Honshū on 30 July, then to northern Honshū and Hokkaidō on 9–10 August. The latter attacks thoroughly destroyed the marshaling area for a planned airborne suicide raid on the B-29 bases in the Marianas. On 13–14 August, her aircraft returned to the Tokyo area and helped to subject the Japanese capital to another severe drubbing. On the morning of 16 August, Ticonderoga launched another strike against Tokyo. During or just after that attack, word reached TF 38 to the effect that Japan had capitulated. The shock of peace, though not so abrupt as that of war almost four years previously, took some getting used to. Ticonderoga and her sister ships remained on a full war footing. She continued patrols over Japanese territory and sent reconnaissance flights in search of camps containing Allied prisoners of war so that air-dropped supplies could be rushed to them. On 6 September – four days after the formal surrender ceremony aboard Missouri – Ticonderoga entered Tokyo Bay.

=== Post-war ===
Her arrival at Tokyo ended one phase of her career and began another. From Tokyo, she embarked homeward-bound to Bremerton Navy Yard in Puget Sound and was again put to sea on 20 October 1945. After a stop in Pearl Harbor in November to alter the carrier to accommodate additional passengers for the Operation Magic Carpet voyage, she steamed to Okinawa, Japan, to pick up servicemen and returned home with a Typhoon on her back reaching Alameda Navy Yard in Oakland, CA in December 1945. She disembarked her passengers and unloaded cargo before heading out to the Philippines at Samar to pick up another group of veterans. Leaving Philippines in early January 1946, she headed home to Puget Sound Naval Shipyard outside of Seattle, WA delivering an estimated two to four thousand returning servicemen and unloading armaments and ammunition before entering the Bremerton Navy Yard to prepare for inactivation.

Almost a year later on 9 January 1947, Ticonderoga was placed out of commission and berthed with the Bremerton Group of the Pacific Reserve Fleet.

On 31 January 1952, Ticonderoga came out of reserve and went into reduced commission for the transit from Bremerton to New York. She departed Puget Sound on 27 February and reached New York on 1 April. Three days later, she was decommissioned at the New York Naval Shipyard to begin the extensive SCB-27C conversion. During the ensuing 29 months, the carrier received numerous modifications – steam catapults to launch jets, a new nylon barricade, a new deck-edge elevator and the latest electronic and fire control equipment – necessary for her to become an integral unit of the fleet. On 11 September 1954, Ticonderoga was recommissioned at New York, Captain William A. "Bill" Schoech in command.

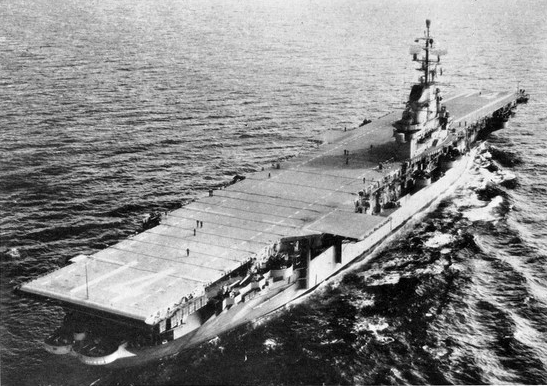
Ticonderoga following her SCB-27C conversion, circa 1954.

In January 1955, the carrier shifted to her new home port – Naval Station Norfolk, Norfolk, Virginia – where she arrived on the 6th. Over the next month, she conducted carrier qualifications with Air Group 6 in the Virginia Capes operating area. On 3 February, she sailed out of Hampton Roads for shakedown near Cuba, after which she returned via Norfolk to New York for additional alterations. During the late summer, the warship resumed carrier qualifications in the Virginia Capes area.

She visited Philadelphia over Labor Day weekend to participate in the International Air Show. To demonstrate the power of her new steam catapults, on three consecutive days she launched North American AJ-1 Savages while standing at anchor in the Delaware River. Ticonderoga next participated in tests of four new aircraft – the A4D-1 Skyhawk, F4D-1 Skyray, F7U Cutlass, and F3H-2N Demon. Ticonderoga then returned to normal operations along the East Coast until 4 November when she departed Naval Station Mayport, Florida, and headed for Europe. She relieved Intrepid at Gibraltar 10 days later and cruised the length of the Mediterranean during the following eight months. On 2 August 1956, Ticonderoga returned to Norfolk and entered the shipyard to receive an angled flight deck and an enclosed hurricane bow as part of the SCB-125 program.

Those modifications were completed by early 1957, and in April she got underway for her new home port – Alameda, California. She reached her destination on 30 May, underwent repairs, and finished out the summer with operations off the California coast. On 16 September, she sailed out of San Francisco Bay and shaped course for the Far East. En route, she stopped at Pearl Harbor before continuing west to Yokosuka Japan, where she arrived on 15 October. For six months, Ticonderoga cruised the waters from Japan in the north to the Philippines in the south. Upon arriving at Alameda on 25 April 1958, she completed her first deployment to the western Pacific since recommissioning.

From 1958 to 1963, Ticonderoga made four more peacetime deployments to the western Pacific. During each, she conducted training operations with other units of the 7th Fleet and made goodwill and liberty port calls throughout the Far East. Early in 1964, she began preparations for her sixth cruise to the western Pacific and, following exercises off the west coast and in the Hawaiian Islands, the carrier cleared Pearl Harbor on 4 May for what began as another peaceful tour of duty in the Far East. The first three months of that deployment brought normal operations—training and port calls.

=== Vietnam ===
==== Gulf of Tonkin incident ====
On 2 August, while operating in international waters in the Gulf of Tonkin, the destroyer Maddox reported being attacked by units of the (North) Vietnam People's Navy. Within minutes of her receipt of the message, Ticonderoga dispatched four, rocket-armed F-8E Crusaders to the destroyer's assistance. Upon arrival, the Crusaders launched Zuni rockets and strafed the North Vietnamese craft with their 20 mm (0.79 in) cannon. After the efforts of Ticonderoga and Maddox, one boat was left dead in the water and the other two damaged.

Two days later, late in the evening of 4 August, Ticonderoga received urgent requests from the destroyer Turner Joy – by then on patrol with Maddox – for air support in resisting what the destroyer alleged to be another torpedo boat foray. The carrier again launched aircraft to aid the American surface ships, and Turner Joy directed them. The Navy surface and air team believed it had sunk two boats and damaged another pair.

President Lyndon Johnson responded with a reprisal to what he felt at the time to be two unprovoked attacks on American seapower and ordered retaliatory air strikes on selected North Vietnamese motor torpedo boat bases. On 5 August, Ticonderoga and Constellation launched 60 sorties against four bases and their supporting oil storage facilities. The USN attacks reportedly resulted in the destruction of 25 PT-type boats, severe damage to the bases, and almost complete razing of the oil storage depot. For her quick reaction and successful combat actions on those three occasions, Ticonderoga received the Navy Unit Commendation.

==== Subsequent operations ====
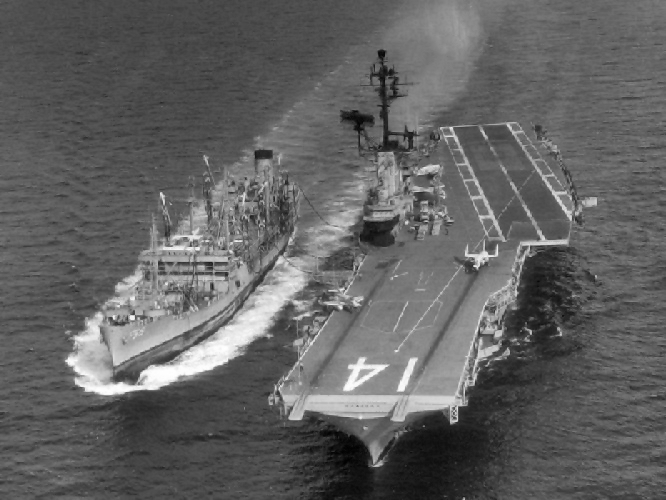
Manatee refuels Ticonderoga on 15 July 1965. U.S. Navy photo.

After a return visit to Japan in September, the aircraft carrier resumed normal operations in the South China Sea until winding up the deployment late in the year. She returned to the Naval Air Station North Island, California, on 15 December 1964. Following post-deployment and holiday stand-down, Ticonderoga moved to the Hunter's Point Naval Shipyard on 27 January 1965 to begin a five-month overhaul. She completed repairs in June and spent the summer operating along the coast of southern California. On 28 September, the aircraft carrier put to sea for another deployment to the Orient. She spent some time in the Hawaiian Islands for an operational readiness exercise then continued on to the Far East. She reached "Dixie Station" on 5 November and immediately began combat air operations.

Ticonderoga's winter deployment of 1965 and 1966 was her first total combat tour of duty during American involvement in the Vietnam War. During her six months in the Far East, the carrier spent a total of 116 days in air operations off the coast of Vietnam dividing her time almost evenly between "Dixie" and "Yankee Stations", the carrier operating areas off South and North Vietnam, respectively. Her air group delivered over 8,000 short tons (7,300 t) of ordnance in more than 10,000 combat sorties, with a loss of 16 aircraft, but only five pilots. For the most part, her aircraft hit enemy installations in North Vietnam and interdicted supply routes into South Vietnam, including river-borne and coastwise junk and sampan traffic as well as roads, bridges, and trucks on land. Specifically, they claimed the destruction of 35 bridges as well as numerous warehouses, barracks, trucks, boats, and railroad cars and severe damage to a major North Vietnamese thermal power plant located at Uong Bi north of Haiphong. After a stop at Yokosuka, Japan, from 25 April to 3 May 1966, the warship put to sea to return to the United States. On 13 May, she pulled into port at San Diego to end the deployment.

On 5 December 1965, an A-4 Skyhawk was lost overboard while the aircraft carrier was 80 miles (130 km) from Kikai Island, Kagoshima Prefecture, Japan. The aircraft was being rolled from a hangar bay onto an elevator. The aircraft had mounted on it a B43 nuclear bomb. The pilot, Lieutenant JG Douglas Webster, the A-4E Skyhawk, BuNo 151022, of Attack Squadron VA-56 "Champions", and the nuclear weapon were all lost. No public mention was made of the incident at the time and it would not come to light until a 1981 United States Department of Defense report revealed that a one-megaton bomb had been lost. Japan then asked for details of the incident.

==== 1966–1967, 1967–1968 deployments ====
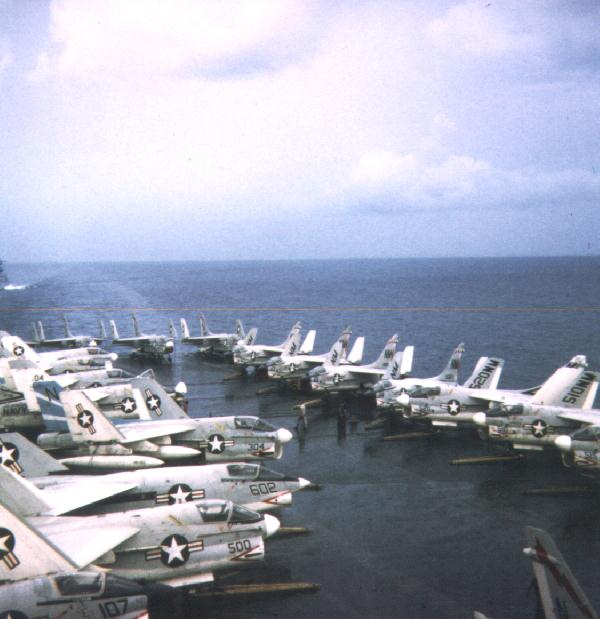
Aircraft of Attack Carrier Air Wing Nineteen (CVW-19) near the time described in the article – this photo is from 1971 when Air Wing Nineteen had moved to USS Oriskany.

Following repairs she steamed out of San Diego on 9 July to begin a normal round of West Coast training operations. Those and similar evolutions continued until 15 October, when Ticonderoga departed San Diego, bound via Hawaii for the western Pacific. The carrier reached Yokosuka, Japan, on 30 October and remained there until 5 November when she headed south for an overnight stop at U.S. Naval Base Subic Bay, Subic Bay in the Philippines on 10–11 November. On 13 November, Ticonderoga arrived in the Gulf of Tonkin and began the first of three combat tours during her 1966–1967 deployment. She launched 11,650 combat sorties, all against enemy targets located in North Vietnam. Again, her primary targets were logistics and communications lines and transportation facilities. For her contribution and that of Air Wing Nineteen to Operation Rolling Thunder, Ticonderoga was awarded her second Navy Unit Commendation.

She completed her final line period on 27 April 1967 and returned to Yokosuka, from which she departed again on 19 May to return to the United States. Ten days later, the carrier entered San Diego and began a month-long, post-deployment stand-down. At the beginning of July, she shifted to Bremerton, Washington, where she entered the Puget Sound for two months of repairs. Upon the completion of yard work, she departed Bremerton on 6 September and steamed south to training operations off the coast of southern California.

On 28 December 1967, Ticonderoga sailed for her fourth combat deployment to the waters off the Indochinese coast and arrived on Yankee Station in January 1968. Ticonderoga was on Yankee Station for the beginning of the 1968 Tet Offensive. Nearly coincidental with the Tet Offensive, the siege of Khe Sanh began and Pueblo, an American spy ship, was seized by the North Koreans and taken to Wonsan harbor. The aircraft carrier Ranger was immediately deployed to the coast of North Korea, beginning Operation Formation Star. Approximately a week later, Ranger was relieved off Korea by Ticonderoga and returned to Yankee Station. Enterprise joined Ticonderoga and strikes were planned against seven MiG airfields with approximately 200 MiGS. These strikes were never executed and Ticonderoga returned to Yankee Station to resume her role in the Tet Offensive. Between January 1968 and July 1968, Ticonderoga was on the line off the coast of Vietnam for five separate periods totaling 120 days of combat duty. During that time, her air wing flew just over 13,000 combat sorties against North Vietnamese and Viet Cong forces, most frequently in the continuing attempts to interdict the enemy lines of supply.

Between line periods, she regularly returned to Subic Bay and Naval Air Station Cubi Point for rest and replenishment. She also made port visits at Singapore and Hong Kong. On 9 July, during her fifth line period, LCDR John B. Nichols claimed Ticonderoga's first MiG kill. The carrier completed that line period and entered Subic Bay for upkeep on 25 July. Ticonderoga then proceeded for her homeport in Naval Air Station North Island, Coronado, California arriving on 17 August 1968 after a one-day delay in the fog off San Diego in the San Clemente Channel. Shortly thereafter, Ticonderoga moved to the Long Beach Naval Shipyard for repairs and certain conversions to handle the A-7 Corsair attack jet and to prepare for her fifth combat cruise in February 1969.

==== Final deployments ====
During the first month of 1969, Ticonderoga made preparations for her fifth consecutive combat deployment to the Southeast Asia area. On 1 February, she cleared San Diego and headed west. After a brief stop at Pearl Harbor a week later, she continued her voyage to Yokosuka where she arrived on the 20th. The carrier departed Yokosuka on 28 February for the coast of Vietnam where she arrived on 4 March. Over the next four months, Ticonderoga served four periods on the line off Vietnam, interdicting Communist supply lines and making strikes against their positions.

During her second line period, however, her tour of duty off Vietnam came to an abrupt end on 16 April when she was shifted north to the Sea of Japan. North Korean aircraft had shot down a Navy reconnaissance aircraft in the area, and Ticonderoga was called upon to beef up the forces assigned to the vicinity. However, the crisis abated, and Ticonderoga entered Subic Bay on 27 April for upkeep. On 8 May, she departed the Philippines to return to "Yankee Station" and resumed interdiction operations. Between her third and fourth line periods, the carrier visited Sasebo and Hong Kong.

The aircraft carrier took station off Vietnam for her last line period of the deployment on 26 June and there followed 37 more days of highly successful air sorties against enemy targets. Following that tour, she joined TF 71 in the Sea of Japan for the remainder of the deployment. Ticonderoga concluded the deployment—a highly successful one, for she received her third Navy Unit Commendation for her operations during that tour of duty—when she left Subic Bay on 4 September.

=== Post-Vietnam service ===
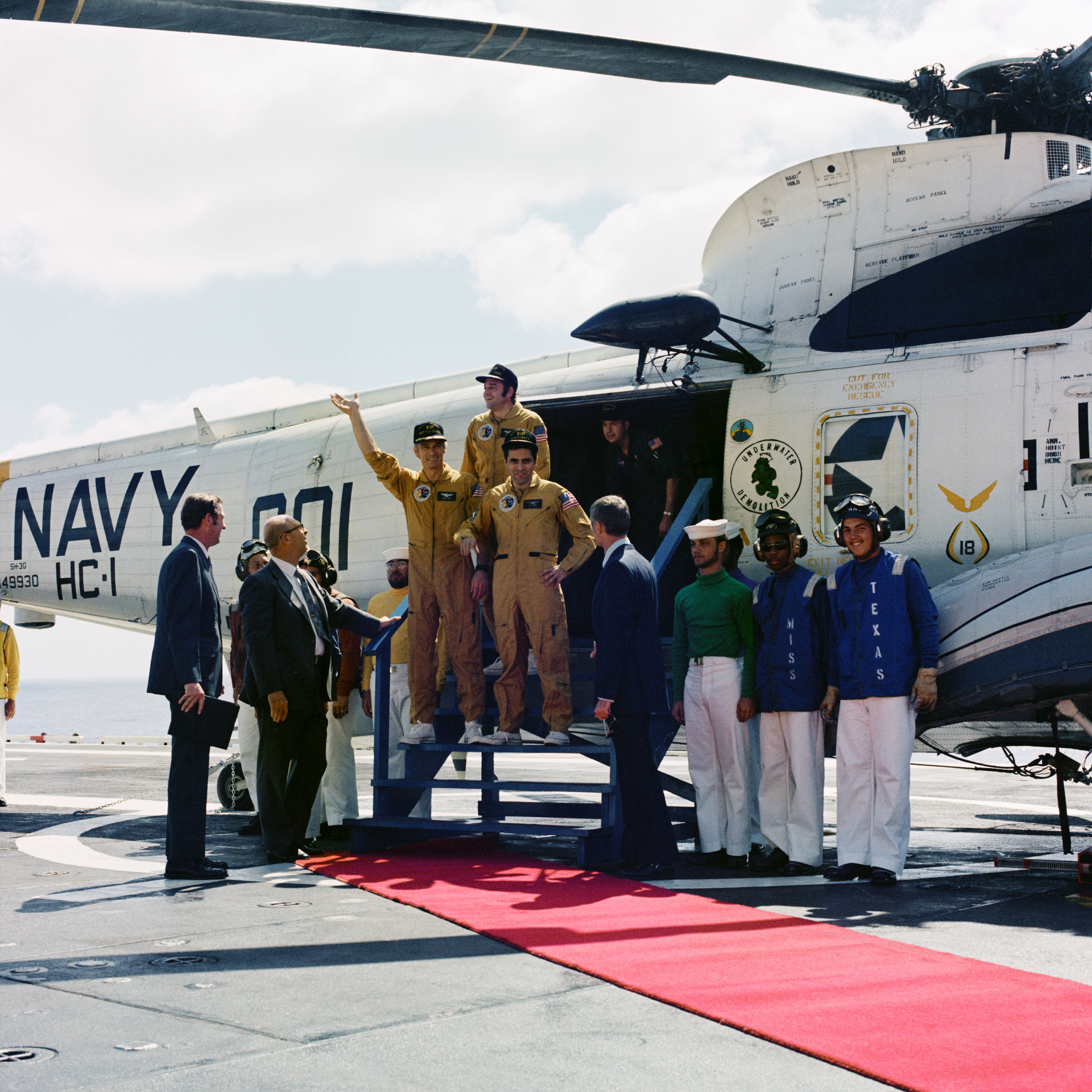
Apollo 17 crew arrive aboard Ticonderoga on 19 December 1972

Ticonderoga arrived in San Diego on 18 September 1969. After almost a month of post-deployment stand-down, she moved to the Long Beach Naval Shipyard in mid-October to begin conversion to an antisubmarine warfare (ASW) aircraft carrier. Overhaul and conversion work began on 20 October, and Ticonderoga was redesignated CVS-14 the next day. She completed overhaul and conversion on 28 May 1970 and conducted exercises out of Long Beach for most of June. On 26 June, the new ASW support carrier entered her new home port, San Diego. In July–August, she conducted refresher training, refresher air operations, and carrier landing qualifications. She operated off the California coast for the remainder of the year and participated in two naval exercises-HUKASWEX 4–70 late in October and COMPUTEX 23–70 between 30 November and 3 December.

USS Ticonderoga made an all but brief appearance in the Movie Tora! Tora! Tora! which was being filmed in 1970, Ticonderoga Flight Deck Number 14 briefly appears in shot, while playing Admiral William (Bull) Halsey's Flagship USS Enterprise (CV-6).

During the remainder of her active career, Ticonderoga made two more deployments to the Far East. Because of her change in mission, neither tour of duty included combat operations off Vietnam. Both, however, included training exercises in the Sea of Japan with ships of the Japanese Maritime Self Defense Force. The first of these two cruises also brought operations in the Indian Ocean with units of the Thai Navy and a transit of Sunda Strait during which a ceremony was held to commemorate the loss of the cruisers Houston and HMAS Perth in 1942. In between these two last deployments, she operated in the eastern Pacific and participated in the recovery of the Apollo 16 Moon mission capsule and astronauts 215 miles SE off Christmas Island during April 1972. The second deployment came in the summer of 1972, and, in addition to the training exercises in the Sea of Japan, Ticonderoga also joined ASW training operations in the South China Sea. That fall, she returned to the eastern Pacific and, in November practiced for the recovery of Apollo 17. The next month, Ticonderoga recovered her second set of space voyagers near American Samoa at decimal -17.88, -166.11. The carrier then headed back to San Diego where she arrived on 28 December. On 22 June 1973, Ticonderoga recovered the Skylab 2 astronauts near San Diego.

Ticonderoga remained active for nine more months, first operating out of San Diego and then making preparations for inactivation. On 1 September 1973, the aircraft carrier was decommissioned after a board of inspection and survey found her to be unfit for further naval service. Her name was struck from the Navy list on 16 November 1973, and arrangements were begun to sell her for scrap. She was sold for scrap 1 September 1975.

== Awards ==
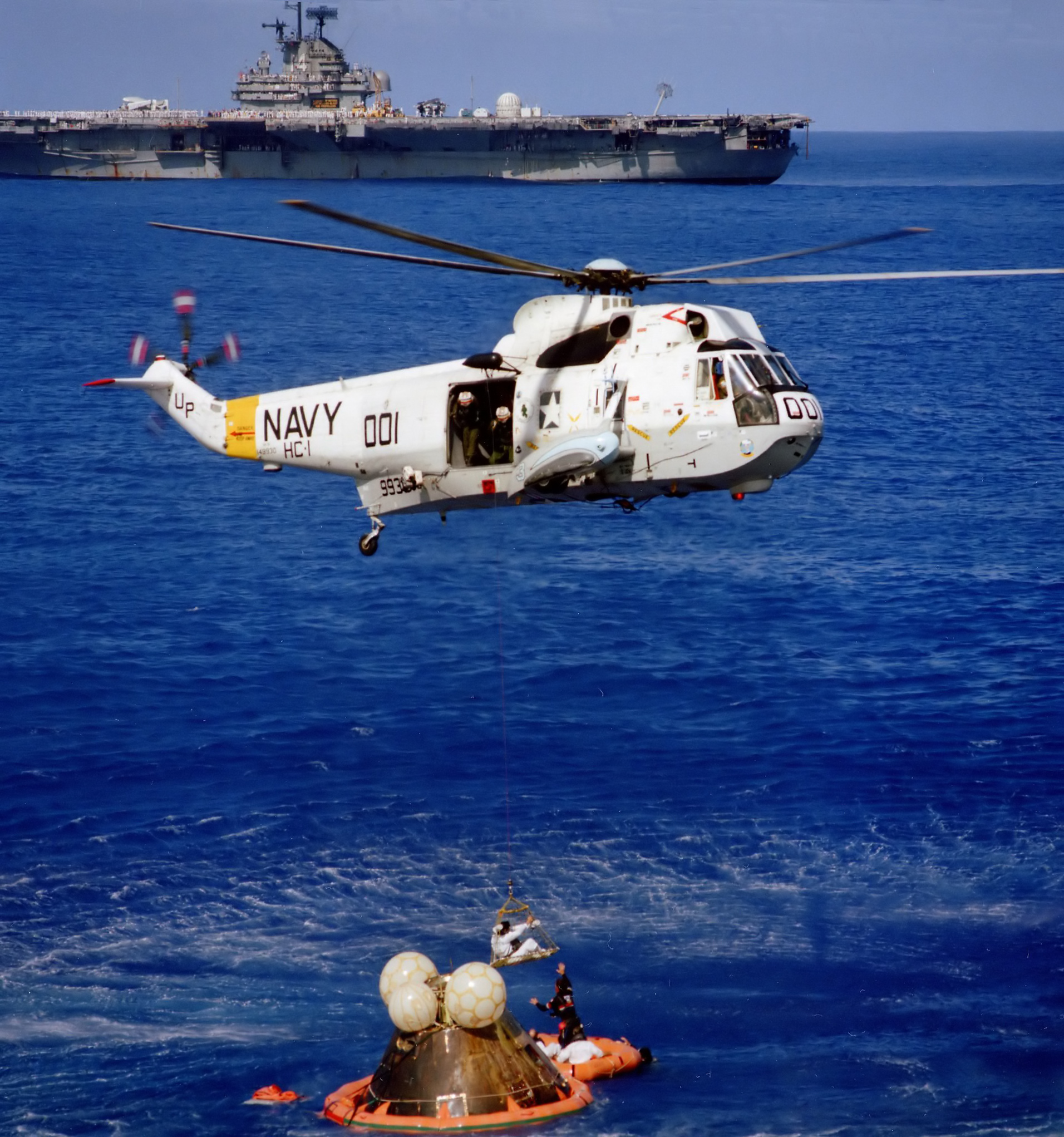
Apollo 17 recovery operations

Ticonderoga received five battle stars during World War II and three Navy Unit Commendations, one Meritorious Unit Commendation, and twelve battle stars during the Vietnam War.

Navy Unit Commendation (thrice)		Navy Meritorious Unit Commendation
American Campaign Medal	Asiatic–Pacific Campaign Medal (5 battle stars)	World War II Victory Medal
Navy Occupation Service Medal (with Asia clasp)	National Defense Service Medal	Armed Forces Expeditionary Medal (4 times)
Vietnam Service Medal (12 battle stars)	Korean Defense Service Medal	Philippine Presidential Unit Citation
Republic of Vietnam Meritorious Unit Citation (Gallantry Cross Medal with Palm)	Philippine Liberation Medal (1 battle star)	Republic of Vietnam Campaign Medal

== Gallery ==
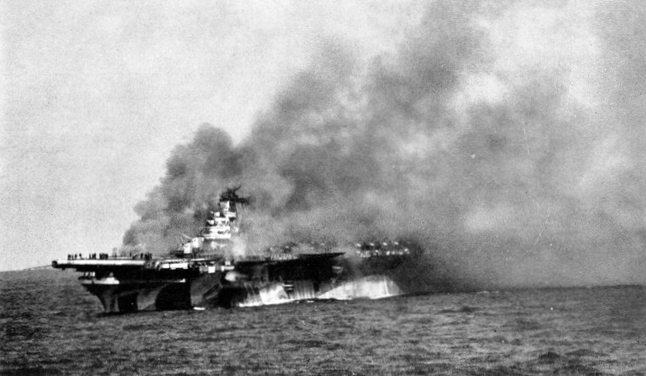
Ticonderoga burning on 21 January 1945

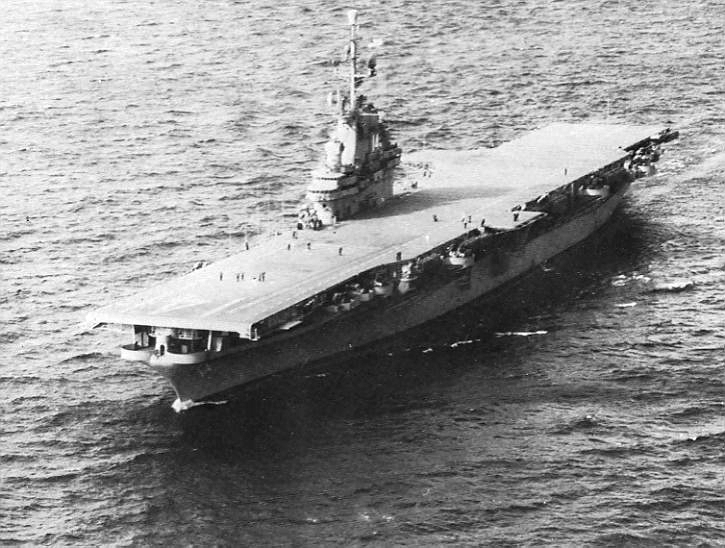
Ticonderoga underway in 1954

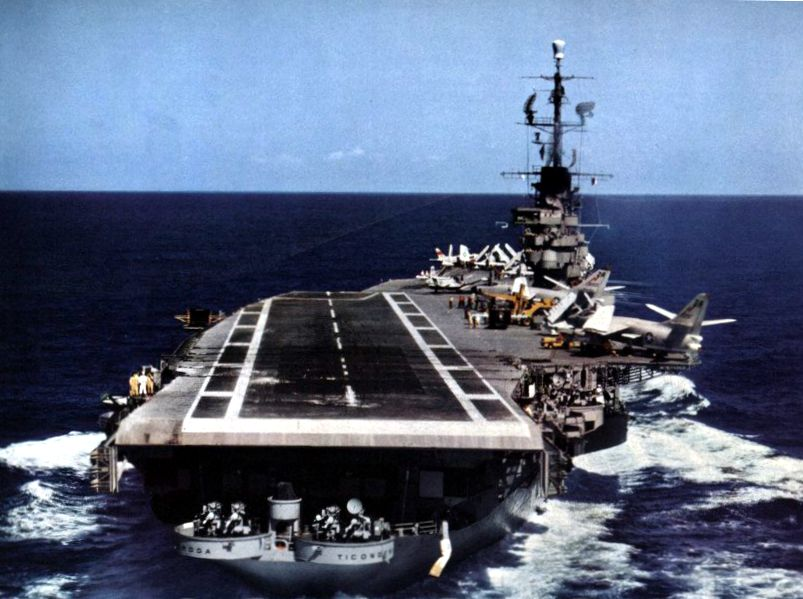
Aft view of Ticonderoga in 1957

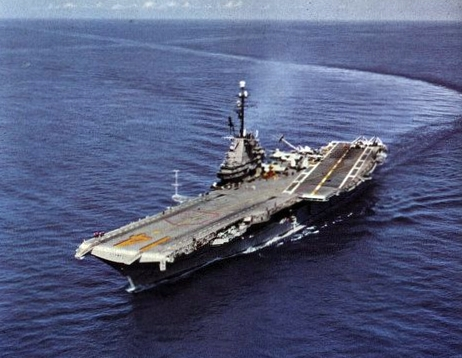
Ticonderoga underway in 1960

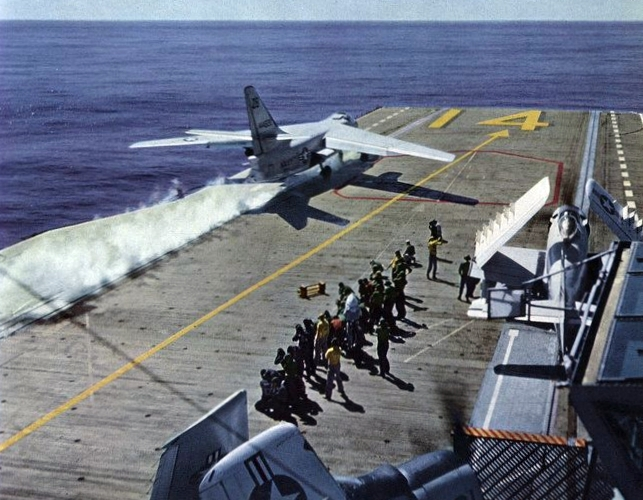
A3D-2 Skywarrior of VAH-4 launching from Ticonderoga in 1960

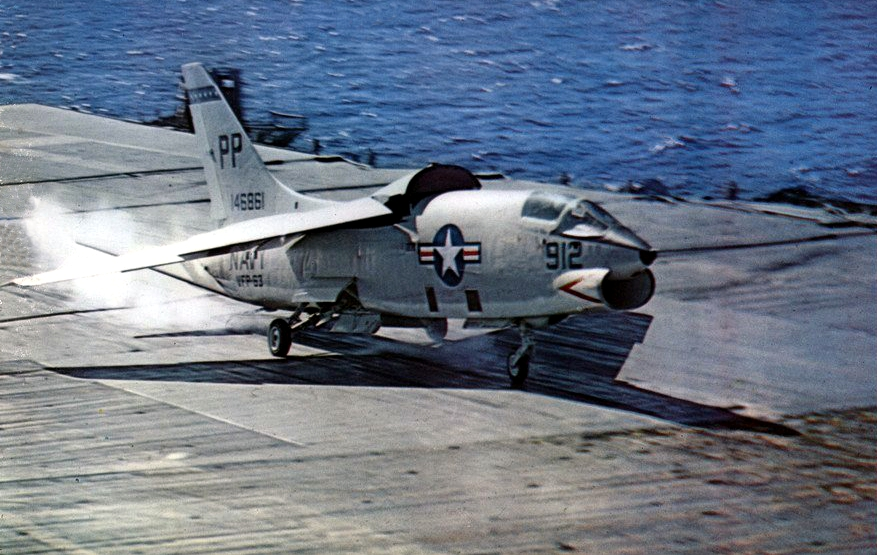
RF-8A of VFP-63 landing on Ticonderoga in 1963

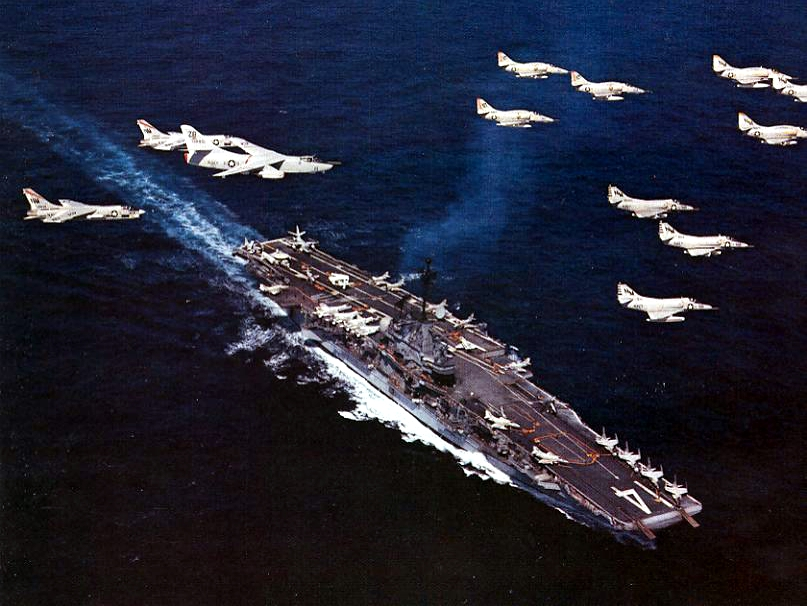
CVW-19 aircraft flying over Ticonderoga in 1968

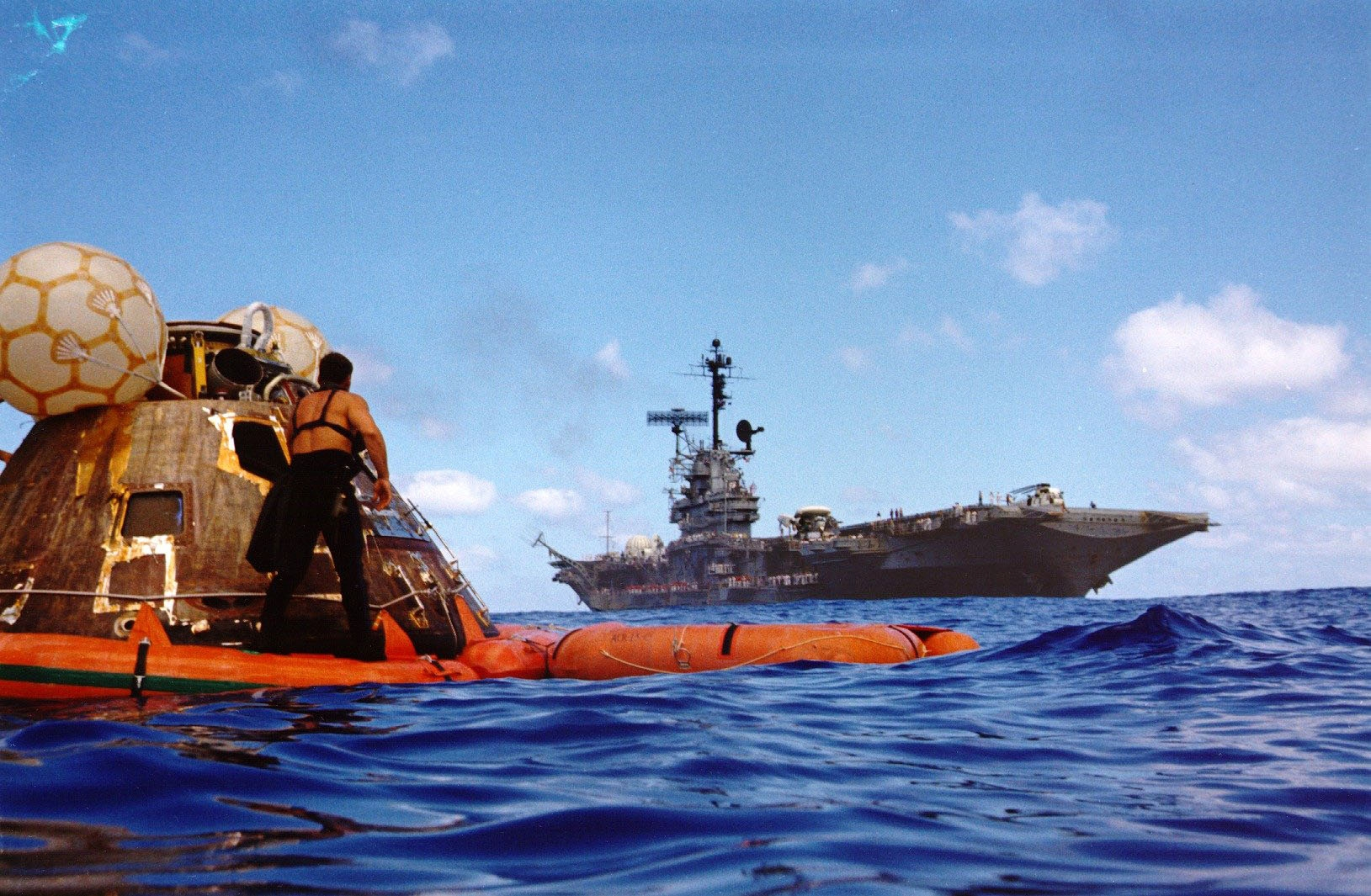
Apollo 17 and Ticonderoga on 19 December 1972
