= List of World War II aces credited with 11–49 victories =

Fighter aces in World War II had tremendously varying kill scores, affected as they were by many factors: the pilot's skill level, the performance of the airplane the pilot flew and the planes they flew against, how long they served, their opportunity to meet the enemy in the air (Allied to Axis disproportion), whether they were the formation's leader or a wingman, the standards their air service brought to the awarding of victory credits, et cetera.

== Aces ==
This background, along with the symbol "†", indicates that the pilot was killed in action, missing in action, died of wounds, or was killed in a flying accident during World War II.

Name	Country	Service(s)	Aerial victories	Other aerial victories	Notes	Image
Rudolf Ehrenberger †	Germany	Luftwaffe	49			
Reinhard Kollak	Germany	Luftwaffe	49		Night fighter ace	
Alexander Pokryshkin	Soviet Union	Soviet Air Force	49		including 4 shared victories	
Klaus Quaet-Faslem †	Germany	Luftwaffe	49			
Amet-khan Sultan	Soviet Union	Soviet Air Force	49		including 19 shared victories	
Walter Borchers †	Germany	Luftwaffe	48+	possibly 59	Night fighter ace	
Heinz Arnold †	Germany	Luftwaffe	48		Jet ace with 7 victories in Me 262	
Friedrich Beckh †	Germany	Luftwaffe	48			
Paul Gildner †	Germany	Luftwaffe	48		Night fighter ace	
Johannes Hager	Germany	Luftwaffe	48		Night fighter ace	
Werner Stumpf †	Germany	Luftwaffe	48			
Heinz-Gerhard Vogt †	Germany	Luftwaffe	48			
Günter Fink †	Germany	Luftwaffe	48		including 11 aerial victories as a night fighter	
Ernst-Georg Drünkler	Germany	Luftwaffe	47		Night fighter ace	
Heinz Golinski †	Germany	Luftwaffe	47			
Günther Hannak	Germany	Luftwaffe	47			
Fritz Karch	Germany	Luftwaffe	47			
Eckhard Hübner †	Germany	Luftwaffe	47			
Herbert Kutscha	Germany	Luftwaffe	47			
Erich Schmidt †	Germany	Luftwaffe	47			
Alexandru Şerbănescu †	Kingdom of Romania	Royal Romanian Air Force	47			
Alexander Koldunov	Soviet Union	Soviet Air Force	47		including 1 shared victory	
Nikolai Skomorokhov	Soviet Union	Soviet Air Force	47		including 3 shared victories	
Arseny Vorozheykin	Soviet Union	Soviet Air Force	46	+6 in Battles of Khalkhin Gol	Ace in each of two wars (though Khalkhin Gol was undeclared)	
Andrey Borovykh	Soviet Union	Soviet Air Force	46		including 17 shared victories	
Hans-Heinz Augenstein	Germany	Luftwaffe	46		Night fighter ace	
Ludwig Becker †	Germany	Luftwaffe	46		Night fighter ace	
Wolfgang Böwing-Treuding †	Germany	Luftwaffe	46			
Erwin Laskowski	Germany	Luftwaffe	46			
Karl Rammelt	Germany	Luftwaffe	46			
Franz Schulte	Germany	Luftwaffe	46			
Paul Semrau †	Germany	Luftwaffe	46		Night fighter ace	
Hugo Dahmer	Germany	Luftwaffe	45			
Ernst Düllberg	Germany	Luftwaffe	45		Credited with 9 heavy bombers shot down	
Rudolf Frank †	Germany	Luftwaffe	45		Night fighter ace	
Alois Lechner †	Germany	Luftwaffe	45		Night fighter ace	
Johann Schmid †	Germany	Luftwaffe	45			
Karl Schnörrer	Germany	Luftwaffe	45		Jet ace with 11 victories in Me 262; Credited with 9 heavy bombers shot down	
Gerhard Schöpfel	Germany	Luftwaffe	45			
Georg Seidel	Germany	Luftwaffe	45			
Vladimir Serov †	Soviet Union	Soviet Air Force	45		including 6 shared victories	
Hans Stollnberger	Germany	Luftwaffe	45			
Alfred Surau	Germany	Luftwaffe	45			
Kurt Tangermann	Germany	Luftwaffe	45			
Otto Vinzent	Germany	Luftwaffe	45			
Ion Milu	Kingdom of Romania	Royal Romanian Air Force	45			
Urho Lehtovaara	Finland	Finnish Air Force	44.5			
Manfred Eberwein	Germany	Luftwaffe	44+			
Mato Dukovac	Croatia	Croatian Air Force	44		Top Croatian ace	
Oiva Tuominen	Finland	Finnish Air Force	44			
Hans Frese	Germany	Luftwaffe	44			
Karl-Wilhelm Hofmann †	Germany	Luftwaffe	44			
Reinhold Knacke †	Germany	Luftwaffe	44		Night fighter ace	
Wilhelm Steinmann	Germany	Luftwaffe	44			
Walther Wever †	Germany	Luftwaffe	44			
Karl Borris	Germany	Luftwaffe	43			
Ludwig Franzisket	Germany	Luftwaffe	43			
Rudolf Klemm	Germany	Luftwaffe	43		Credited with 10 heavy bombers shot down	
Hubert Mütherich	Germany	Luftwaffe	43			
Josef Pöhs †	Germany	Luftwaffe	43			
Daniel Vizanty	Kingdom of Romania	Royal Romanian Air Force	43			
Vladimir Lavrinenkov	Soviet Union	Soviet Air Force	43		including 7 shared victories	
Aleksey Ryazanov	Soviet Union	Soviet Air Force	43		including 12 shared victories	
Fyodor Arkhipenko	Soviet Union	Soviet Air Force	43		including 15 shared victories	
Walter Brandt	Germany	Luftwaffe	42			
Olli Puhakka	Finland	Finnish Air Force	42			
Norbert Hannig	Germany	Luftwaffe	42			
Jürgen Brocke †	Germany	Luftwaffe	42			
Tudor Greceanu	Kingdom of Romania	Royal Romanian Air Force	42			
Rudolf Schmidt	Germany	Luftwaffe	42			
Herbert Schramm †	Germany	Luftwaffe	42			
Robert Olejnik	Germany	Luftwaffe	42			
Nikolai Krasnov †	Soviet Union	Soviet Air Force	42		including 1 shared victory	
Werner Baake	Germany	Luftwaffe	41		Night fighter ace	
Andrey Baklan	Soviet Union	Soviet Air Force	41		including 21 shared victories	
Ernst Börngen	Germany	Luftwaffe	41			
Leopold Fellerer	Germany	Luftwaffe	41		Night fighter ace	
Marmaduke 'Pat' Pattle †	South Africa	Royal Air Force	41		Top British Commonwealth and South African ace, possibly 50+ victories. He scored all his victories on the Gloster Gladiator and the Hawker Hurricane and is the top ace of both aircraft.	
Ludwig Meister	Germany	Luftwaffe	41		Night fighter ace	
Sergey Morgunov	Soviet Union	Soviet Air Force	41			
Mikhail Pivovarov	Soviet Union	Soviet Air Force	41		including 1 shared victory	
Richard Quante †	Germany	Luftwaffe	41			
Hans Stechmann	Germany	Luftwaffe	41			
Ivan Stepanenko	Soviet Union	Soviet Air Force	41		including 9 shared victories	
Wilhelm Balthasar †	Germany	Luftwaffe	40	+7 in Spanish Civil War	Ace in each of two wars (+13 ground kills WWII)	
Richard I. Bong †	United States	U.S. Army Air Forces	40		Top U.S. ace	
Vitaly Popkov	Soviet Union	Soviet Air Force	40			
Ivan Babak	Soviet Union	Soviet Air Force	40		including 5 shared victories	
Pyotr Gnido	Soviet Union	Soviet Air Force	40		including 6 shared victories	
Mikhail Komelkov	Soviet Union	Soviet Air Force	40		including 7 shared victories	
Wolf-Dietrich Huy	Germany	Luftwaffe	40			
Hermann Neuhoff	Germany	Luftwaffe	40			
Günter Steinhausen †	Germany	Luftwaffe	40			
Satoru Anabuki	Japan	Imperial Japanese Army	39		51 claimed	
Eckart-Wilhelm von Bonin	Germany	Luftwaffe	39		Night fighter ace	
Iyozo Fujita	Japan	Imperial Japanese Navy	39			
Kurt Lasse †	Germany	Luftwaffe	39			
Dietrich Schmidt	Germany	Luftwaffe	39	possibly 43	Night fighter ace	
Georg Seelmann	Germany	Luftwaffe	39			
Rudolf Sinner	Germany	Luftwaffe	39			
Peter Bremer	Germany	Luftwaffe	38			
Hans Dortenmann	Germany	Luftwaffe	38			
Cvitan Galić †	Croatia	Croatian Air Force	38			
James Edgar "Johnnie" Johnson	United Kingdom	Royal Air Force	38		Top Spitfire Ace.	
Gerhard Koall †	Germany	Luftwaffe	38			
Stefan Litjens	Germany	Luftwaffe	38			
Thomas B. McGuire †	United States	U.S. Army Air Forces	38			
Detlev Rohwer †	Germany	Luftwaffe	38			
Kurt Sochatzy	Germany	Luftwaffe	38			
Eduard Tratt †	Germany	Luftwaffe	38			
Günther Bahr	Germany	Luftwaffe	37		Night fighter ace	
Heinz Bretnütz	Germany	Luftwaffe	37			
Karl-Heinz Leesmann †	Germany	Luftwaffe	37			
Sergey Luganski	Soviet Union	Soviet Air Force	37			
Klaus Neumann	Germany	Luftwaffe	37		Jet ace with 5 victories in Me 262	
Waldemar Radener	Germany	Luftwaffe	37		Credited with 11 heavy bombers shot down	
Karl-Wolfgang Redlich †	Germany	Luftwaffe	37	+4 in Spanish Civil War		
Wilhelm Beier	Germany	Luftwaffe	36		Night fighter ace	
Helmut Belser †	Germany	Luftwaffe	36			
Helmut Bergmann †	Germany	Luftwaffe	36		Night fighter ace	
Walter Ehle †	Germany	Luftwaffe	36		Night fighter ace	
Friedrich Körner	Germany	Luftwaffe	36			
Olavi Puro	Finland	Finnish Air Force	36			
Franz Ruhl †	Germany	Luftwaffe	36		Credited with 13 heavy bombers shot down	
Maximilian Volke †	Germany	Luftwaffe	36			
Hans Weik	Germany	Luftwaffe	36		Credited with 22 heavy bombers shot down	
Nils Katajainen	Finland	Finnish Air Force	35.5			
Heinrich Graf von Einsiedel	Germany	Luftwaffe	35			
Anton-Rudolf Piffer †	Germany	Luftwaffe	35		Credited with 26 heavy bombers shot down	
Bruno Stolle	Germany	Luftwaffe	35			
Aleksey Alelyukhin	Soviet Union	Soviet Air Force	34		including 6 shared victories	
Vladimir Bobrov	Soviet Union	Soviet Air Force	34	+13 and 4 shared in Spanish Civil War	including 11 shared victories	
Klaus Bretschneider	Germany	Luftwaffe	34		incl. 14 as Night fighter ace	
Heinz-Horst Hißbach †	Germany	Luftwaffe	34		Night fighter ace	
Wilhelm Johnen	Germany	Luftwaffe	34		Night fighter ace	
Karl Kennel	Germany	Luftwaffe	34			
David McCampbell	United States	U.S. Navy	34		Top U.S. Navy ace, Ace in a day on two different occasions	
Johannes Naumann	Germany	Luftwaffe	34			
Toshio Ota †	Japan	Imperial Japanese Navy	34			
Oskar Zimmermann	Germany	Luftwaffe	34			
Heinz-Martin Hadeball	Germany	Luftwaffe	33		Night fighter ace	
Josef Kociok †	Germany	Luftwaffe	33		Night fighter ace	
Heinz Knoke	Germany	Luftwaffe	33			
Ernst-Wilhelm Modrow	Germany	Luftwaffe	33	possibly 34	Night fighter ace	
Pierre Clostermann	France	Free French Air Force; Royal Air Force	33		Top French ace	
Erich Brunotte	Germany	Luftwaffe	33			
Günther Bleckmann †	Germany	Luftwaffe	33			
Lauri Nissinen †	Finland	Finnish Air Force	32.5			
Hugo Frey †	Germany	Luftwaffe	32		Credited with 25 heavy bombers shot down	
Werner Husemann	Germany	Luftwaffe	32		Night fighter ace	
Kyösti Karhila	Finland	Finnish Air Force	32			
Werner Machold	Germany	Luftwaffe	32			
Adolph 'Sailor' Malan	South Africa	Royal Air Force	32			
Ján Režňák	Slovak Republic	Slovak Air Force	32		Top Slovak ace, possibly 35 victories	
Kazuo Sugino	Japan	Imperial Japanese Navy	32			
George F. "Buzz" Beurling	Canada	Royal Air Force	31.5		Top Canadian ace of WWII	
Hans-Karl Mayer †	Germany	Luftwaffe	31	+8 in Spanish Civil War	Ace in each of two wars	
Paul-Hubert Rauh	Germany	Luftwaffe	31		Night fighter ace	
Karl-Heinz Scherfling †	Germany	Luftwaffe	31+		Night fighter ace	
Alexandr Kumanichkin	Soviet Union	Soviet Air Force	31			
Jorma Karhunen	Finland	Finnish Air Force	31			
Dezső Szentgyörgyi	Hungary	Royal Hungarian Air Force	30.5		Top Hungarian ace	
Pavel Golovachev	Soviet Union	Soviet Air Force	30+			
Gerhard Friedrich †	Germany	Luftwaffe	30		Night fighter ace	
Pual Brandt †	Germany	Luftwaffe	30			
Karl-Heinz Langer	Germany	Luftwaffe	30			
Robert Roland Stanford Tuck	United Kingdom	Royal Air Force	30			
William Vale	United Kingdom	Royal Air Force	30		+6 shared	
Franz Blazytko	Germany	Luftwaffe	30			
Erich Bartz	Germany	Luftwaffe	30			
Friedrich-Karl "Nasen" Müller	Germany	Luftwaffe	30		Night fighter ace	
Kaneyoshi Mutoh †	Japan	Imperial Japanese Navy	30			
Ryotaro Jobou	Japan	Imperial Japanese Army	30			
Emil Vesa	Finland	Finnish Air Force	29.5			
Rudolf Altendorff	Germany	Luftwaffe	29		Night fighter ace	
Günther Bertram	Germany	Luftwaffe	29		Night fighter ace	
Pual Brandt †	Germany	Luftwaffe	29			
Fritz Gromotka	Germany	Luftwaffe	29			
Paul Szameitat †	Germany	Luftwaffe	29		Night fighter ace	
Heinrich Wohlers †	Germany	Luftwaffe	29		Night fighter ace	
Bob Braham	United Kingdom	Royal Air Force	29		Night fighter ace	
Clive Caldwell	Australia	Royal Australian Air Force	28.5		Top Australian ace of WWII. Top P-40 ace. Ace in a day.	
Tapio Järvi	Finland	Finnish Air Force	28.5			
Ernst Andres †	Germany	Luftwaffe	28			
Anton Benning	Germany	Luftwaffe	28		Night fighter ace	
Gregory "Pappy" Boyington	United States	American Volunteer Group; U.S. Marine Corps	28		Ace status on 2 different air forces. Includes six kills he claimed with the AVG, though records indicate he had only 2 aerial kills and 1.5 kills on the ground.	
Max Bucholz	Germany	Luftwaffe	28		Ace in a day	
"Paddy" Finucane †	Ireland	Royal Air Force	28		Top Irish ace	
Francis "Gabby" Gabreski	United States	U.S. Army Air Forces	28	+6.5 in Korean War	Ace in each of two wars (+2.5 ground kills WWII)	
Igor Kaberov	Soviet Union	Soviet Naval Aviation	28		including 18 shared victories	
Hans-Heinrich Koenig †	Germany	Luftwaffe	28			
Izidor Kovárik	Slovak Republic	Slovak Air Force	28	possibly 29		
Yasuhiko Kuroe	Japan	Imperial Japanese Army	28	+2 in Actions in Mongolia	51 claimed	
"Ginger" Lacey	United Kingdom	Royal Air Force	28			
Willi Reschke	Germany	Luftwaffe	28		Credited with 20 heavy bombers shot down	
Saburō Sakai	Japan	Imperial Japanese Navy	28		Includes unknown number of shared. Claims 64 total victories.	
Hermann Wischnewski	Germany	Luftwaffe	28		Night fighter ace	
Colin Falkland Gray	New Zealand	Royal Air Force	27.5		Top New Zealand ace	
Rudolf Busch	Germany	Luftwaffe	27+			
Heinz Beyer	Germany	Luftwaffe	27			
Alfred Burk	Germany	Luftwaffe	27			
Neville Duke	United Kingdom	Royal Air Force	27			
Wilhelm Mayer †	Germany	Luftwaffe	27			
Lothar Linke †	Germany	Luftwaffe	27		Night fighter ace	
Hans Remmer †	Germany	Luftwaffe	27		Credited with 8 heavy bombers shot down	
Constantin Rozariu	Kingdom of Romania	Royal Romanian Air Force	27			
Robert S. Johnson	United States	U.S. Army Air Forces	27			
Charles H. MacDonald	United States	U.S. Army Air Forces	27			
Junichi Sasai †	Japan	Imperial Japanese Navy	27			
Sadaaki Akamatsu	Japan	Imperial Japanese Navy	27			
George E. Preddy, Jr. †	United States	U.S. Army Air Forces	26.83		Ace in a day (+5 ground kills)	
Eric Lock †	United Kingdom	Royal Air Force	26.5			
Emil Clade	Germany	Luftwaffe	26			
Franz Stigler	Germany	Luftwaffe	26			
Peter Werfft	Germany	Luftwaffe	26		Credited with 14 heavy bombers shot down	
Klaus Alakoski	Finland	Finnish Air Force	26			
Nobuo Ogiya	Japan	Imperial Japanese Navy	26			
Ján Gerthoffer	Slovak Republic	Slovak Air Force	26			
Joseph J. Foss	United States	U.S. Marine Corps	26		Top ace under USMC-only service	
György Debrődy	Hungary	Royal Hungarian Air Force	26			
Lajos Tóth	Hungary	Royal Hungarian Air Force	26			
Russell Bannock	Canada	Royal Canadian Air Force	25.5		includes 19 V-1 flying bombs	
Egon Albrecht-Lemke †	Germany; Brazil	Luftwaffe	25			
Ludwig Bellof	Germany	Luftwaffe	25			
Frank Reginald Carey	United Kingdom	Royal Air Force	25			
Robert M. Hanson †	United States	U.S. Marine Corps	25			
Naoshi Kanno	Japan	Imperial Japanese Navy	25			
Wolfgang Lippert †	Germany	Luftwaffe	25	+5 in Spanish Civil War	Ace in each of two wars	
Helmut Meckel †	Germany	Luftwaffe	25			
László Molnár †	Hungary	Royal Hungarian Air Force	25			
Boris Safonov †	Soviet Union	Soviet Naval Aviation	25		+14 shared	
Ekkehard Tichy †	Germany	Luftwaffe	25			
Lance C. Wade †	United States	Royal Air Force	25		Top US ace in RAF	
Josef Fözö	Germany	Luftwaffe	24	+3 in Spanish Civil War		
John C. Meyer	United States	U.S. Army Air Forces	24	+2 in Korean War	(+13 ground kills)	
Walter Adolph †	Germany	Luftwaffe	24	+1 in Spanish Civil War		
Ernst-Erich Hirschfeld †	Germany	Luftwaffe	24		Including 8 as a night fighter pilot	
Willy Unger	Germany	Luftwaffe	24		Credited with 21 heavy bombers shot down	
Karl-Heinz Krahl †	Germany	Luftwaffe	24			
George Gilroy	United Kingdom	Royal Air Force	24			
Cecil E. Harris	United States	U.S. Navy	24			
Johannes Le Roux	South Africa	Royal Air Force	23.5		Generally credited with attacking & wounding Erwin Rommel in his staff car in Normandy on 17 July 1944	
Hans Autenrieth	Germany	Luftwaffe	23		Night fighter ace	
Horst Patuschka †	Germany	Luftwaffe	23			
Leo Schuhmacher	Germany	Luftwaffe	23		Claimed with 10 heavy bombers shot down	
Peter Spoden	Germany	Luftwaffe	23		Night fighter ace	
Fritz Müller	Germany	Luftwaffe	23		Jet ace with 6 victories in Me 262	
Erich Woitke †	Germany	Luftwaffe	23	+4 in Spanish Civil War		
Fred Ohr	United States	U.S. Army Air Corps	23		Top Korean-American ace, +17 Ground kills	
Marcel Albert	France	Free French Air Force; Royal Air Force	23		Probably 2 more	
Douglas Bader	United Kingdom	Royal Air Force	23		All 23 kills scored after losing both legs in a 1931 aircraft crash	
Eugene A. Valencia	United States	U.S. Navy	23			
Kalevi Tervo	Finland	Finnish Air Force	23			
Jorma Saarinen	Finland	Finnish Air Force	23			
Eero Kinnunen	Finland	Finnish Air Force	22.5			
David C. Schilling	United States	U.S. Army Air Forces	22.5		(+10.5 ground kills)	
Helmut-Felix Bolz	Germany	Luftwaffe	22	possibly 56, +3 in Spanish Civil War		
Richard Heller †	Germany	Luftwaffe	22			
Rolf Pingel	Germany	Luftwaffe	22	+6 Spanish Civil War	Ace in each of two wars	
Teresio Vittorio Martinoli †	Kingdom of Italy	Regia Aeronautica	22		Top Italian ace of WWII; +14 shared	
Leonardo Ferrulli †	Kingdom of Italy	Regia Aeronautica	22			
Artur Beese †	Germany	Luftwaffe	22			
Alan Christopher Deere	New Zealand	Royal Air Force	22			
Reinhold Eckardt †	Germany	Luftwaffe	22		Night fighter ace	
Gerald R. Johnson	United States	U.S. Army Air Forces	22			
Neel E. Kearby †	United States	U.S. Army Air Forces	22			
Desmond McMullen	United Kingdom	Royal Air Force	22			
Jay T. Robbins	United States	U.S. Army Air Forces	22			
Ion Mucenica	Kingdom of Romania	Royal Romanian Air Force	22			
Dominic S. Gentile	United States	Royal Air Force; U.S. Army Air Forces	21.83		victories with 2 air forces (+7 ground kills)	
Rolf Kaldrack †	Germany	Luftwaffe	21+	+3 in Spanish Civil War		
Donald Kingaby	United Kingdom	Royal Air Force	21		+2 shared	
Antti Tani	Finland	Finnish Air Force	21.5			
William V. Crawford-Crompton	New Zealand	Royal Air Force	21.5			
Raymond Brown Hesselyn	New Zealand	Royal New Zealand Air Force	21.5			
Fred J. Christensen	United States	U.S. Army Air Forces	21.5			
Ray S. Wetmore	United States	U.S. Army Air Forces	21 1/4		(+2 ground kills)	
Herbert Altner	Germany	Luftwaffe	21		Night fighter ace	
Branse Burbridge	United Kingdom	Royal Air Force	21		Top RAF night fighter ace	
Archie McKellar †	United Kingdom	Royal Air Force	21		Ace in a day	
Jean Demozay	France	Royal Air Force	21			
Franco Lucchini †	Kingdom of Italy	Regia Aeronautica	21	+6 in Spanish Civil War	Ace in each of two wars (+52 shared WWII)	
Franz von Werra †	Germany	Luftwaffe	21			
John J. Voll	United States	U.S. Army Air Forces	21			
Kenneth A. Walsh	United States	U.S. Marine Corps	21			
Paavo Myllylä	Finland	Finnish Air Force	21			
Walker 'Bud' Melville Mahurin	United States	U.S. Army Air Forces	20.75	+3.5 in Korean War		
Helmut Baudach	Germany	Luftwaffe	20+		Jet ace with 5 victories in Me 262	
Donald N. Aldrich	United States	U.S. Marine Corps	20			
Rudolf Artner	Germany	Luftwaffe	20			
Hans Berschwinger †	Germany	Luftwaffe	20		Night fighter ace	
Cristea Chirvasuta	Kingdom of Romania	Royal Romanian Air Force	20			
Michael Crossley	United Kingdom	Royal Air Force	20			
Gerald Edge	United Kingdom	Royal Air Force	20			
Lothar Keller †	Germany	Luftwaffe	20	+3 in Spanish Civil War		
Thomas J. Lynch †	United States	U.S. Army Air Forces	20			
Evan Mackie	New Zealand	Royal New Zealand Air Force	20		+3 shared	
Henry Wallace McLeod †	Canada	Royal Canadian Air Force	20			
Ernst Richter	Germany	Luftwaffe	20		12 claimed at the Eastern front and 8 at the Western front	
Gerhard Sommer †	Germany	Luftwaffe	20			
Willi Tritsch	Germany	Luftwaffe	20			
Robert B. Westbrook †	United States	U.S. Army Air Forces	20			
Vernon Crompton Woodward	Canada	Royal Air Force	20			
Viktor Pyötsiä	Finland	Finnish Air Force	19.5			
Väinö Suhonen	Finland	Finnish Air Force	19.5			
Geoffrey Allard	United Kingdom	Royal Air Force	19		+5 shared	
Herbert Hallowes	United Kingdom	Royal Air Force	19			
Paul Becker	Germany	Luftwaffe	19			
Erhard Peters †	Germany	Luftwaffe	19		Night fighter ace	
Adolf Kalkum	Germany	Luftwaffe	19			
Franco Bordoni	Kingdom of Italy	Regia Aeronautica	19		5 victories with biplane; +18 shared	
Roy Dutton	United Kingdom	Royal Air Force	19			
Winfried Schmidt	Germany	Luftwaffe	19			
W. G. G. Duncan Smith	United Kingdom	Royal Air Force	19		DSO*, DFC**	
Luigi Gorrini	Kingdom of Italy	Regia Aeronautica	19		1 victory with biplane, 24 victories claimed	
John "Cat's Eyes" Cunningham	United Kingdom	Royal Air Force	19		Night fighter ace	
Glenn E. Duncan	United States	U.S. Army Air Forces	19		(+7.8 ground kills)	
James Francis Edwards	Canada	Royal Canadian Air Force	19			
Patrick D. Fleming	United States	U.S. Navy	19			
Cornelius N. Nooy	United States	U.S. Navy	19			
John Lucian Smith	United States	U.S. Marine Corps	19			
Alexander Vraciu	United States	U.S. Navy	19		Ace in a Day – 6 victories in one sortie 6/19/1944, averaged 10 rounds/gun/victory in that mission	
Erik Teromaa	Finland	Finnish Air Force	19			
Constantin Lungulescu	Kingdom of Romania	Royal Romanian Air Force	19			
Stanisław Skalski	Poland	Polish Air Force; Royal Air Force	18.91		Top Polish ace, first Allied ace of the WW2	
Arthur J. Benko	United States	U.S. Army Air Forces	18.5		highest scoring American aerial gunner of the WW2	
Marion E. Carl	United States	U.S. Marine Corps	18.5			
Lauri Pekuri	Finland	Finnish Air Force	18.5			
Leonard K. Carson	United States	U.S. Army Air Forces	18.5		(+3.5 ground kills)	
Glenn Eagleston	United States	U.S. Army Air Forces	18.5	+2 in Korean War	(+5 ground kills)	
Wilbur J. Thomas	United States	U.S. Marine Corps	18.5			
Lev Shestakov †	Soviet Union	Soviet Air Force	18	+2 and 1 shared in Spanish Civil War	+9 shared	
Yukiyoshi Wakamatsu	Japan	Imperial Japanese Army	18+			
Motomitsu Aoki †	Japan	Imperial Japanese Army	18		Korean pilot during the Japanese occupation era. Up to 23 claimed. KIA during the Korean War as Brig. Gen. Geun-Seok Lee of the ROK Air Force	
Tateo Katō	Japan	Imperial Japanese Army	18		up to 30 claimed	
Karel Kuttelwascher	Czechoslovakia	Royal Air Force	18		possibly 20	
Harry von Bülow-Bothkamp	Germany	Luftwaffe	18	+6 in World War I	Ace in each of two wars	
Witold Urbanowicz	Poland	Polish Air Force; Royal Air Force	18			
Walter C. Beckham	United States	U.S. Army Air Forces	18			
Adrian Boyd	United Kingdom	Royal Air Force	18			
Herschel H. Green	United States	U.S. Army Air Forces	18			
John C. "Pappy" Herbst	United States	U.S. Army Air Forces	18			
George Urquhart Hill	Canada	Royal Canadian Air Force	18			
Albert Gerald Lewis	South Africa	Royal Air Force	18		Ace in a day	
Miklós Kenyeres	Hungary	Royal Hungarian Air Force	18			
Alfred Marshall †	United Kingdom	Royal Air Force	18			
Charles H. Older	United States	American Volunteer Group; U.S. Army Air Forces	18		Ace status on 2 different air forces	
Takeo Tanimizu	Japan	Imperial Japanese Navy	18			
Pierre Le Gloan †	France	French Air Force; Free French Air Force	18		Ace in a day	
Hubert Zemke	United States	U.S. Army Air Forces	17.75			
John B. England	United States	U.S. Army Air Forces	17.5			
Duane W. Beeson	United States	U.S. Army Air Forces	17 1/3		(+4.8 ground kills)	
Jouko Huotari	Finland	Finnish Air Force	17.5			
John F. Thornell	United States	U.S. Army Air Forces	17 1/4		(+2 ground kills)	
Henry William Brown	United States	U.S. Army Air Forces	17.2		(+14.5 ground kills)	
Theodor Rossiwall	Germany	Luftwaffe	17	+2 Spanish Civil War		
Michael Arooth	United States	U.S. Army Air Forces	17		B-17 Flying Fortress tail gunner	
Rudolf Božík	Slovak Republic	Slovak Air Force	17			
Ugo Drago	Kingdom of Italy; Italian Social Republic	Regia Aeronautica; Aeronautica Nazionale Repubblicana	17			
Edgar Kain †	New Zealand	Royal Air Force	17		First RAF fighter ace of WWII	
William "Willie" McKnight	Canada	Royal Air Force	17			
Josef František	Czechoslovakia	Royal Air Force	17			
Jorma Sarvanto	Finland	Finnish Air Force	17		Ace in a day (four minutes)	
Yrjö Turkka	Finland	Finnish Air Force	17			
Gerald W. Johnson	United States	U.S. Army Air Forces	17			
James S. Varnell Jr.	United States	U.S. Army Air Forces	17			
Bolesław Gładych	Poland	Polish Air Force; French Air Force; Royal Air Force; U.S. Army Air Forces	17		victories with 3 air forces	
Keith Truscott	Australia	Royal Australian Air Force	17			
Petrus Hugo	South Africa	Royal Air Force	17			
Stanley Orr	United Kingdom	Fleet Air Arm	17			
Paul Galland †	Germany	Luftwaffe	17			
John Villa	United Kingdom	Royal Air Force	17			
Tony Lovell	United Kingdom	Royal Air Force	16		+6 shared (+1 ground kill)	
Eugeniusz Horbaczewski	Poland	Polish Air Force; Royal Air Force	16.5			
William T. Klersy †	Canada	Royal Canadian Air Force	16.5		(+2 ground kills)	
Aulis Lumme	Finland	Finnish Air Force	16.5			
James MacLachlan	United Kingdom	Royal Air Force	16.5		7.5 after the amputation of his left arm	
Eero Riihikallio	Finland	Finnish Air Force	16.5			
Nigel Cullen	Australia	Royal Air Force	16.5			
John T. Godfrey	United States	U.S. Army Air Forces	16 1/3		(+18 ground kills)	
Adrian Goldsmith	Australia	Royal Australian Air Force	16 1/4			
Clarence E. Anderson	United States	U.S. Army Air Forces	16 1/4		(+1 ground kill)	
Les Clisby	Australia	Royal Air Force	16			
Franjo Dzal	Croatia	Croatian Air Force	16			
Douglas Baker †	United States	U.S. Navy	16			
Eero Halonen	Finland	Finnish Air Force	16			
Bill Harris	United States	U.S. Army Air Forces	16			
Buck McNair	Canada	Royal Canadian Air Force	16			
John Plagis	Rhodesia	Royal Air Force	16		Top Rhodesian ace	
Michael Robinson †	United Kingdom	Royal Air Force	16			
James Sanders	United Kingdom	Royal Air Force	16			
Ioan Dicezare	Kingdom of Romania	Royal Romanian Air Force	16			
Ira C. Kepford	United States	U.S. Navy	16			
Charles R. Stimpson	United States	U.S. Navy	16			
Stan Turner	Canada	Royal Canadian Air Force	16			
William T. Whisner, Jr.	United States	U.S. Army Air Forces	16	+5.5 in Korean War	Ace in each of two wars (+3.5 ground kills WWII)	
George Welch	United States	U.S. Army Air Forces	16			
Edmond Marin la Meslée †	France	French Air Force	16			
Mario Visintini	Kingdom of Italy	Regia Aeronautica	16	+1 in Spanish Civil War	Top Biplane ace of WWII (+32 ground kills)	
Vasile Gavriliu	Kingdom of Romania	Royal Romanian Air Force	16			
Ernest Mason	United Kingdom	Royal Air Force	15+		+2 shared	
John Lloyd Waddy	Australia	Royal Australian Air Force	15.5			
Donald M. Beerbower	United States	U.S. Army Air Forces	15.5			
Brian Carbury	New Zealand	Royal Air Force	15.5		Ace in a day	
Edward F. Charles	Canada	Royal Air Force	15.5			
Richard A. Peterson	United States	U.S. Army Air Forces	15.5		(+3.5 ground kills)	
James E. Swett	United States	U.S. Marine Corps	15.5		Ace in a day	
David Lee "Tex" Hill	United States	American Volunteer Group; U.S. Army Air Forces	15 1/4		Ace status on 2 different air forces	
Mark Henry Brown †	Canada	Royal Air Force	15	+4 shared	First Canadian ace of WWII	
Semyon Bychkov	Soviet Union; Germany	Soviet Air Force; Luftwaffe	15		including 5 shared victories. Taken as prisoner and served in Luftwaffe	
Martti Alho	Finland	Finnish Air Force	15			
Ljudevit Bencetic	Croatia	Croatian Air Force	15			
Jack T. Bradley	United States	U.S. Army Air Forces	15			
Samuel J. Brown	United States	U.S. Army Air Forces	15			
Edward "Porky" Cragg	United States	U.S. Army Air Forces	15			
František Cyprich	Slovak Republic	Slovak Air Force	15		possibly 18	
Kenneth H. Dahlberg	United States	U.S. Army Air Forces	15			
Robert Francis Thomas "Bob" Doe	United Kingdom	Royal Air Force	15		Includes two shared. One more probable.	
William D. Dunham	United States	U.S. Army Air Forces	15			
Robert W. Foy	United States	U.S. Army Air Forces	15			
John "Jack" Frost †	South Africa	South African Air Force	15			
Raymond Harries	United Kingdom	Royal Air Force	15		+3 shared	
Ralph K. Hofer	United States	U.S. Army Air Forces	15		(+14 ground kills)	
Cyril F. Homer	United States	U.S. Army Air Forces	15			
Paterson Hughes	Australia	Royal Air Force	15			
Georg Kraft †	Germany	Luftwaffe	15		Night fighter ace	
Don C. Laubman	Canada	Royal Canadian Air Force	15			
Reginald Llewellyn	United Kingdom	Royal Air Force	15			
Ian Roy MacLennan	Canada	Royal Canadian Air Force	15			
Richard Milne	United Kingdom	Royal Air Force	15		+1 unconfirmed	
Alan Owen	United Kingdom	Royal Air Force	15		+1 V-1 flying bomb	
Harold L. Spears †	United States	U.S. Marine Corps	15			
Stoyan Stoyanov	Bulgaria	Royal Bulgarian Air Force	15			
Alois Vašátko †	Czechoslovakia	Royal Air Force	15			
Donald H. Bochkay	United States	U.S. Army Air Forces	14.84			
Donald J. Blakeslee	United States	Royal Air Force; U.S. Army Air Forces	14.5		victories with 2 air forces	
John D. Landers	United States	U.S. Army Air Forces	14.5		(+20 ground kills)	
Aaro Nuorala	Finland	Finnish Air Force	14.5			
Joseph H. Powers, Jr.	United States	U.S. Army Air Forces	14.5			
Ronald Berry	United Kingdom	Royal Air Force	14		+10 shared	
Johnnie Checketts	New Zealand	Royal New Zealand Air Force	14.5			
Henry Brown	United States	U.S. Army Air Force	14.5		(+14.5 ground kills)	
Charles Scherf	Australia	Royal Australian Air Force	14.5		(+9 ground kills)	
David Fairbanks	Canada	Royal Canadian Air Force	14		Top Hawker Tempest ace with 13 of his 14 victories scored on it.	
Mario Bellagambi	Kingdom of Italy	Regia Aeronautica	14			
Svein Heglund	Norway	Royal Air Force	14			
Sophus Baagoe †	Germany	Luftwaffe	14			
William Klersy †	Canada	Royal Canadian Air Force	14		(+1 shared)	
Günther Wegmann	Germany	Luftwaffe	14		Jet ace with 8 victories in Me 262	
Robert Boyd	United Kingdom	Royal Air Force	14		(also 7 shared)	
František Brezina	Slovak Republic	Slovak Air Force	14			
Bruce W. Carr	United States	U.S. Army Air Forces	14		(+10 ground kills)	
Robert C. Curtis	United States	U.S. Army Air Forces	14			
Robert M. DeHaven	United States	U.S. Army Air Forces	14			
Archie Donahue	United States	U.S. Marine Corps	14			
Wallace N. Emmer	United States	U.S. Army Air Forces	14			
James A. Goodson	United States	U.S. Army Air Forces	14		(+13 ground kills)	
Arthur R. Hawkins	United States	U.S. Navy	14			
Arthur F. Jeffrey	United States	U.S. Army Air Forces	14			
John Kilmartin	Ireland	Royal Air Force	14			
Edward O. McComas	United States	U.S. Army Air Forces	14			
Elbert S. McCuskey	United States	U.S. Navy	14			
Donald McKay	United Kingdom	Royal Air Force	14		+ one unconfirmed	
Daniel T. Roberts, Jr.	United States	U.S. Army Air Forces	14			
Gray Stenborg †	New Zealand	Royal New Zealand Air Force	14			
Richard Stevens †	United Kingdom	Royal Air Force	14		+ 1 shared	
John L. Wirth	United States	U.S. Navy	14			
István Fábián	Hungary	Royal Hungarian Air Force	14			
István Kálmán	Hungary	Royal Hungarian Air Force	14			
George Carpenter	United States	U.S. Army Air Forces	13.833		(+4 ground kills)	
William Henry Franklin	United Kingdom	Royal Air Force	13.5			
George Chamberlain Duncan	United States	U.S. Navy	13.5			
Pekka Kokko	Finland	Finnish Air Force	13.5			
Heimo Lampi	Finland	Finnish Air Force	13.5			
Roger W. Mehle	United States	U.S. Navy	13.5			
Donald J. Strait	United States	U.S. Army Air Forces	13.5			
Donald S. Bryan	United States	U.S. Army Air Forces	13.3		Ace in a day	
Darrell S. Cramer	United States	U.S. Army Air Forces	13			
Hans Hahn*	Germany	Luftwaffe	13		Night fighter ace	
Ivo von Lubich-Edler Milowa*	Germany	Luftwaffe	13			
Andrew McDowall	United Kingdom	Royal Air Force	13			
Kenneth Mackenzie	United Kingdom	Royal Air Force	13			
John Wong Pan-Yang	United States	Chinese Nationalist Air Force	13			
James L. Brooks	United States	U.S. Army Air Forces	13			
Jan Zumbach	Poland	Polish Air Force; Royal Air Force	13			
Safet Boskic	Croatia	Croatian Air Force	13			
Mervyn Shipard	Australia	Royal Australian Air Force	13			
Daniel A. Carmichael, Jr.	United States	U.S. Navy	13			
James N. Cupp	United States	U.S. Marine Corps	13			
Clyde B. East	United States	U.S. Army Air Forces	13			
Robert E. Galer	United States	U.S. Marine Corps	13			
John F. Hampshire	United States	U.S. Army Air Forces	13			
Bruce K. Holloway	United States	U.S. Army Air Forces	13			
William P. Marontate	United States	U.S. Marine Corps	13			
Willard. W. Millikan	United States	U.S. Army Air Forces	13		(+2 ground kills)	
Glennon T. Moran	United States	U.S. Army Air Forces	13		(+3 ground kills)	
Robert Neale	United States	American Volunteer Group	13		(+2.5 ground kills)	
László Pottyondi	Hungary	Royal Hungarian Air Force	13			
László Máthé	Hungary	Royal Hungarian Air Force	13			
Edward Mortimer-Rose †	United Kingdom	Royal Air Force	13			
Robin Olds	United States	U.S. Army Air Forces	13	+4 in Vietnam War	(+11 ground kills)	
James O'Meara	United Kingdom	Royal Air Force	13			
Yrjö Pallasvuo	Finland	Finnish Air Force	13			
Harry A. Parker	United States	U.S. Army Air Forces	13			
Roy W. Rushing	United States	U.S. Navy	13			
Edward O. Shaw †	United States	U.S. Marine Corps	13			
John Shepherd	United Kingdom	Royal Air Force	13	Also destroyed 7 V-1 flying bombs	Total includes five shared.	
AJ "Jackie" Sewell	United Kingdom	Fleet Air Arm	13			
John Simpson	United Kingdom	Royal Air Force	13			
Roderick Smith	Canada	Royal Canadian Air Force	13	(+1 shared victory and 1 shared probable)		
Robert W. Stephens	United States	U.S. Army Air Forces	13			
John R. Strane	United States	U.S. Navy	13			
Robert Lee Scott, Jr.	United States	U.S. Army Air Forces	13			
John Topham	United Kingdom	Royal Air Force	13			
Wendell V. Twelves	United States	U.S. Navy	13			
Tony Bartley	United Kingdom	Royal Air Force	13			
Ian Richard Gleed	United Kingdom	Royal Air Force	13			
Albert Houle	Canada	Royal Canadian Air Force	13			
Felix D. Williamson	United States	U.S. Army Air Forces	13			
Tiberiu Vinca	Kingdom of Romania	Royal Romanian Air Force	13			
Ioan Maga	Kingdom of Romania	Royal Romanian Air Force	13			
John Webster †	United Kingdom	Royal Air Force	13			
Jefferson Wedgwood †	United Kingdom	Royal Air Force	13			
Henryk Pietrzak	Poland	Polish Air Force; Royal Air Force	12.5			
Lasse Aaltonen	Finland	Finnish Air Force	12.5			
Ted Thorn	United Kingdom	Royal Air Force	12.5			
Frederick James Barker	United Kingdom	Royal Air Force	12.5		rear gunner of Ted Thorn	
Andrew "Nicky" Barr	Australia	Royal Australian Air Force	12.5			
Tony Gaze	Australia	Royal Air Force	12.5			
Lowell K. Brueland	United States	U.S. Army Air Forces	12.5	+2 in Korean War		
Kenneth D. Frazier	United States	U.S. Marine Corps	12.5			
David Charles "Foob" Fairbanks	United States	Royal Canadian Air Force	12.5			
Irving Farmer Kennedy	Canada	Royal Canadian Air Force	12.5			
Eino Koskinen	Finland	Finnish Air Force	12.5			
Onni Paronen	Finland	Finnish Air Force	12.5			
Urho Sarjamo †	Finland	Finnish Air Force	12.5			
Per-Erik Sovelius	Finland	Finnish Air Force	12.5			
James C. Stewart	United States	U.S. Army Air Forces	12.5		(+1 ground kill)	
James H. Howard	United States	American Volunteer Group; U.S. Army Air Forces	12 1/3		victories with 2 air forces (6 1/3 with AVG and 6 with USAF)	
Quince L. Brown	United States	U.S. Army Air Forces	12 1/3		(+2 ground kills)	
Harold Atkinson †	United Kingdom	Royal Air Force	12		(+2 unconfirmed)	
Luigi Baron	Kingdom of Italy	Regia Aeronautica	12			
Stanley Connors †	United Kingdom	Royal Air Force	12		(+2 unconfirmed, with a half share in another unconfirmed destroyed)	
Edward Crew	United Kingdom	Royal Air Force	12			
Mato Culinovic	Croatia	Croatian Air Force	12			
Thomas Grier †	United Kingdom	Royal Air Force	12			
Arthur Hodgkinson †	United Kingdom	Royal Air Force	12			
Graham Hogg †	United Kingdom	Royal Navy	12			
Harold Howes †	United Kingdom	Royal Air Force	12			
George Keefer	Canada	Royal Canadian Air Force	12			
John A. Kent	Canada	Royal Air Force	12		(+1 ground kill)	
Lydia Litvyak †	Soviet Union	Soviet Air Force	12	range 6–12	highest ranking female ace	
Johannes Lutter	Germany	Luftwaffe	12			
Eduard Martinko	Croatia	Croatian Air Force	12			
Veca Mikovic	Croatia	Croatian Air Force	12			
Frederick Robertson †	United Kingdom	Royal Air Force	12			
Zlatko Stipcic	Croatia	Croatian Air Force	12			
Marian Pisarek	Poland	Polish Air Force; Royal Air Force	12			
John Dundas	United Kingdom	Royal Air Force	12			
John Freeborn	United Kingdom	Royal Air Force	12			
Robert Barton	Canada	Royal Air Force	12	(+5 shared victories and 2 probables)		
Wilfred Sizer	United Kingdom	Royal Air Force	12			
Jozef Štauder	Slovak Republic	Slovak Air Force	12		possibly 13	
James Storrar	United Kingdom	Royal Air Force	12		(+2 shared)	
Pavol Zeleňák	Slovak Republic	Slovak Air Force	12			
Bruce Bretherton	Australia	Royal Australian Air Force	12			
Charles Crombie	Australia	Royal Australian Air Force	12			
Peter Turnbull	Australia	Royal Australian Air Force	12			
John Yarra	Australia	Royal Australian Air Force	12			
Anton Matúšek	Slovak Republic	Slovak Air Force	12			
Leo Ahokas	Finland	Finnish Air Force	12			
Michael Brezas	United States	U.S. Army Air Forces	12			
Levi R. Chase	United States	U.S. Army Air Forces	12			
Clement M. Craig	United States	U.S. Navy	12			
Nicholas Gresham Cooke †	United Kingdom	Royal Air Force	12		Ace in a day	
David B. Eastham	United States	U.S. Army Air Forces	12			
Loren D. Everton	United States	U.S. Marine Corps	12			
Luigi Giannella	Kingdom of Italy	Regia Aeronautica	12			
George W. Gleason	United States	U.S. Army Air Forces	12		(+2.5 ground kills)	
Leroy E. Harris	United States	U.S. Navy	12			
Coatsworth B. Head, Jr.	United States	U.S. Army Air Forces	12			
Roger R. Hedrick	United States	U.S. Navy	12			
Howard D. Hively	United States	U.S. Army Air Forces	12		(+2.5 ground kills)	
Kenneth G. Ladd	United States	U.S. Army Air Forces	12			
Albert Lippett †	United Kingdom	Royal Air Force	12		Ace in a day, turret gunner on a two-man fighter plane	
William J. Masoner, Jr.	United States	U.S. Navy	12			
Pierce McKennon	United States	U.S. Army Air Forces	12		(+9.7 ground kills)	
Robert W. Moore	United States	U.S. Army Air Forces	12			
József Málik †	Hungary	Royal Hungarian Air Force	12			
Ferenc Málnássy †	Hungary	Royal Hungarian Air Force	12			
Hamilton McWhorter III	United States	U.S. Navy	12			
František Peřina	Czechoslovakia	Royal Air Force	12			
Michael J. Quirk	United States	U.S. Army Air Forces	12		(+5 ground kills)	
Jack Rae	New Zealand	Royal New Zealand Air Force	12			
Attilio Sanson	Kingdom of Italy	Regia Aeronautica	12			
Leroy A. Schreiber	United States	U.S. Army Air Forces	12		(+2 ground kills)	
Harold E. Segal	United States	U.S. Marine Corps	12			
James A. Shirley	United States	U.S. Navy	12			
Norman C. Skogstad	United States	U.S. Army Air Forces	12			
William J. Sloan	United States	U.S. Army Air Forces	12			
Giorgio Solaroli di Briona	Kingdom of Italy	Regia Aeronautica	12			
Eugene A. Trowbridge	United States	U.S. Army Air Forces	12			
Richard E. Turner	United States	U.S. Army Air Forces	12		possibly just 11 (+2 V-1 flying bombs)	
James A. Watkins	United States	U.S. Army Air Forces	12			
Edward Wells	New Zealand	Royal New Zealand Air Force	12		(+4 probables)	
Richard L. West	United States	U.S. Army Air Forces	12			
Harold White	United Kingdom	Royal Air Force	12			
Nicholas Megura	United States	U.S. Army Air Forces	11.84		(+3.8 ground kills)	
George R. Carr	United States	U.S. Navy	11.5			
James A. Clark, Jr.	United States	U.S. Army Air Forces	11.5		(+4.5 ground kills)	
Paul A. Conger	United States	U.S. Army Air Forces	11.5			
Olin E. Gilbert	United States	U.S. Army Air Forces	11.5			
William T. Halton	United States	U.S. Army Air Forces	11.5		(+2 ground kills)	
John A. Kirla, Jr.	United States	U.S. Army Air Forces	11.5		(+.5 ground kill)	
William N. Snider	United States	U.S. Marine Corps	11.5			
Albert O. Vorse Jr.	United States	U.S. Navy	11.5			
Charles E. "Chuck" Yeager	United States	U.S. Army Air Forces	11.5		Ace in a day	
Basilios Michael Vassilios "Vass" Vassiliades	Greece	Royal Air Force	11.5			
Liu Chi-Sheng / Liu Zhesheng	China	Chinese Nationalist Air Force	11.3		Top Chinese ace	
Howard Mayers	Australia	Royal Air Force	11.3			
Louis H. Norley	United States	U.S. Army Air Forces	11.3		(+5 ground kills)	
Philip C. DeLong	United States	U.S. Marine Corps	11.2	+2 in Korean War		
Herbert Bauer	Germany	Luftwaffe	11			
Richard John Cork	United Kingdom	Fleet Air Arm	11		Ace in a day	
George Jameson	New Zealand	Royal New Zealand Air Force	11		Highest scoring New Zealand night fighter pilot of WWII	
Ian Bedford Nesbitt Russell	Australia	Royal Air Force	11			
Albin Starc	Croatia	Croatian Air Force	11			
Josip Helebrant	Croatia	Croatian Air Force	11			
Stjepan Martinasevic	Croatia	Croatian Air Force	11			
Harold W. Bauer †	United States	U.S. Marine Corps	11			
John T. Blackburn	United States	U.S. Navy	11			
William A. Dean, Jr.	United States	U.S. Navy	11			
László Dániel	Hungary	Royal Hungarian Air Force	11			
Henry Ferriss †	United Kingdom	Royal Air Force	11			
Geoff Fisken	New Zealand	Royal New Zealand Air Force	11			
Carl M. Frantz	United States	U.S. Army Air Forces	11			
James B. French	United States	U.S. Navy	11			
Robert J. Goebel	United States	U.S. Army Air Forces	11			
Ronald Hamlyn	United Kingdom	Royal Air Force	11		Ace in a day	
Phillip L. Kirkwood	United States	U.S. Navy	11			
John B. Lawler	United States	U.S. Army Air Forces	11			
Hemmo Leino	Finland	Finnish Air Force	11			
Francis J. Lent	United States	U.S. Army Air Forces	11			
Leland P. Molland	United States	U.S. Army Air Forces	11			
William L. Leverette	United States	U.S. Army Air Forces	11			
John S. Loisel	United States	U.S. Army Air Forces	11			
Wayne L. Lowry	United States	U.S. Army Air Forces	11			
Carlo Magnaghi	Kingdom of Italy	Regia Aeronautica	11			
Charles M. Mallory	United States	U.S. Navy	11			
Aleksey Maresyev	Soviet Union	Soviet Air Force	11		3 victories after losing his legs	
Eric Marrs †	United Kingdom	Royal Air Force	11			
Charles M. McCorkle	United States	U.S. Army Air Forces	11			
Norman L. McDonald	United States	U.S. Army Air Forces	11			
John W. Mitchell	United States	U.S. Army Air Forces	11	+4 in Korean War		
Urho Nieminen	Finland	Finnish Air Force	11			
Harvey P. Picken	United States	U.S. Navy	11			
James V. Reber, Jr.	United States	U.S. Navy	11			
Elmer W. Richardson	United States	U.S. Army Air Forces	11		possibly just 8	
Robert H. Riddle	United States	U.S. Army Air Forces	11			
James F. Rigg	United States	U.S. Navy	11			
Donald E. Runyon	United States	U.S. Navy	11			
Donald H. Sapp	United States	U.S. Marine Corps	11			
Warren Schrader	New Zealand	Royal New Zealand Air Force	11			
Murray Shubin	United States	U.S. Army Air Forces	11			
Otto Smik †	Czechoslovakia	Royal Air Force	11		(+3 V-1 flying bombs)	
Cornelius Smith, Jr.	United States	U.S. Army Air Forces	11			
Kenneth C. Sparks	United States	U.S. Army Air Forces	11			
Richard E. Stanbrook	United States	U.S. Navy	11			
Ilkka Törrönen	Finland	Finnish Air Force	11			
Mario Veronesi	Kingdom of Italy	Regia Aeronautica	11			
Harold Walmsley	United Kingdom	Royal Air Force	11			
Ioan Malacescu	Kingdom of Romania	Royal Romanian Air Force	11			
Teodor Zabava	Kingdom of Romania	Royal Romanian Air Force	11			
