= Robert Westbrook =

Robert Westbrook may refer to:

- Robert T. Westbrook (born 1945), American novelist
- Robert B. Westbrook (historian) (born 1950), American historian
- Robert B. Westbrook (pilot) (1917–1944), United States Army Air Forces officer and World War II flying ace
