= John Wirth =

John Wirth may refer to:

- John Wirth (historian) (1936–2002), professor of Latin American studies
- John Wirth (television producer), television showrunner, producer, and writer
- John L. Wirth (1917–1945), United States Navy officer
