= Rudolf Ehrenberger =

- Born: 25 August 1915; Arbesthal
- Died: 8 March 1944 (aged 28)
- Cause of death: Killed in action
- Military career
- Allegiance: Nazi Germany
- Branch: Luftwaffe
- Rank: Oberfeldwebel
- Unit: JG 53
- Conflicts: World War II: Operation Barbarossa; Siege of Malta; Defence of the Reich
- Awards: Knight's Cross of the Iron Cross

Rudolf Ehrenberger (25 August 1915 – 8 March 1944) was a German Luftwaffe ace and recipient of the Knight's Cross of the Iron Cross during World War II. Ehrenberger was killed on 8 March 1944 near Wittenberge, Nazi Germany. He was posthumously awarded the Knight's Cross on 6 April 1944. During his career he was credited with 49 aerial victories.

== Early life and career ==
Ehrenberger was born on 25 August 1915 in Arbesthal in the district of Bruck an der Leitha in Lower Austria.

== World War II ==
The bulk of the Geschwader's air elements were moved via Jever, in northern Germany, to Mannheim-Sandhofen on 8 June 1941. There the aircraft were given a maintenance overhaul prior to moving east. The II. Gruppe was transferred to Neusiedel in East Prussia, present-day Malomožaiskojė in Kaliningrad Oblast in Russia, between 12–14 June.

On 5 October 1941, II. Gruppe of JG 53 was withdrawn from the Eastern Front and ordered to Insterburg, present-day Chernyakhovsk. The Gruppe was then sent to Leeuwarden Airfield in the Netherlands where they arrived on 12. October.

On 8 March 1944, Ehrenberger was killed in action near Wittenberge in aerial combat with Boeing B-17 Flying Fortress bombers and escorting Republic P-47 Thunderbolt fighters. He had managed to bail out of his Messerschmitt Bf 109 G-6 (Werknummer 440111—factory number) but was then shot in his parachute. Posthumously, Ehrenberger was awarded the Knight's Cross of the Iron Cross (Ritterkreuz des Eisernen Kreuzes) on 6 April 1944 for his 49 aerial victories claimed.

== Summary of career ==
=== Aerial victory claims ===
Mathews and Foreman, authors of Luftwaffe Aces — Biographies and Victory Claims, researched the German Federal Archives and found records for 47 aerial victory claims. This figure includes ten aerial victories on the Eastern Front and 37 over the Western Allies, including three four-engined bombers.

Victory claims were logged to a map-reference (PQ = Planquadrat), for example "PQ 13 Ost 1849". The Luftwaffe grid map (Jägermeldenetz) covered all of Europe, western Russia and North Africa and was composed of rectangles measuring 15 minutes of latitude by 30 minutes of longitude, an area of about 360 square miles (930 km^{2}). These sectors were then subdivided into 36 smaller units to give a location area 3 km × 4 km (1.9 mi × 2.5 mi) in size.

Chronicle of aerial victories
| Claim | Date | Time | Type | Location | Claim | Date | Time | Type | Location |
|---|---|---|---|---|---|---|---|---|---|
This and the # (hash mark) indicates those aerial victories listed by Prien, Stemmer, Rodeike and Bock without an explicit sequence number. This and the ? (question mark) indicates information discrepancies listed by Prien, Stemmer, Rodeike, Bock, Mathews, and Foreman.
– 6. Staffel of Jagdgeschwader 53 – At the Channel and over England — 26 June 1940 – 21 June 1941
| 1 | 27 September 1940 | 13:20? (Note: According to Mathews and Foreman claimed at 13:35.) | Spitfire | south of Dover north of London | | | | | |
– 4. Staffel of Jagdgeschwader 53 – Operation Barbarossa — 22 June – 8 October 1941
| # | 4 July 1941 | 16:46 | SB-3 | | # | 8 July 1941 | 05:55 | SB-3 | Ostrov |
According to Prien, Stemmer, Rodeike and Bock, Ehrenberger claimed four undocumented aerial victories in the July 1941. These four undocumented claims are not listed by Mathews and Foreman.
| 8 | 27 August 1941 | 13:45 | I-153 | | 12 | 16 September 1941 | 11:30 | I-16 | |
| 9 | 27 August 1941 | 13:46 | I-153 | | 13 | 17 September 1941 | 18:02 | I-16? (Note: According to Mathews and Foreman claimed as a Mikoyan-Gurevich MiG-1.) | |
| 10 | 29 August 1941 | 18:40? (Note: According to Mathews and Foreman claimed at 18:46.) | I-16 | | 14 | 26 September 1941 | 16:11 | I-18 (MiG-1) | |
| 11 | 10 September 1941 | 18:10 | I-16 | | 15 | 28 September 1941 | 16:13 | Pe-2 | |
– 6. Staffel of Jagdgeschwader 53 – Mediterranean Theater — 15 December 1941 – 31 December 1942
| 16 | 29 December 1941 | 10:07 | Hurricane | | 25 | 22 April 1942 | 18:06 | Spitfire | |
| 17 | 24 March 1942 | 15:03 | Spitfire | | 26 | 6 May 1942 | 10:03 | Spitfire | |
| 18 | 26 March 1942 | 12:50? (Note: According to Mathews and Foreman claimed at 12:30.) | Hurricane | | 27 | 17 May 1942 | 08:29 | Spitfire | 20 km (12 mi) north-northeast of La Valetta |
| 19 | 31 March 1942 | 10:28 | Hampden | | 28 | 18 May 1942 | 11:03 | Spitfire | |
| 20 | 5 April 1942 | 14:40 | Spitfire | | 29 | 10 June 1942 | 10:10 | Spitfire | 8 km (5.0 mi) east of Marsa Scirocco |
| 21 | 10 April 1942 | 18:03 | Hurricane | Luqa | 30 | 10 June 1942 | 13:30 | Spitfire | |
| 22 | 10 April 1942 | 18:05 | Hurricane | | 31 | 14 July 1942 | 10:26 | Spitfire | |
| 23 | 10 April 1942 | 18:11 | Hurricane | Luqa | 32 | 16 October 1942 | 11:23 | Spitfire | 2 km (1.2 mi) east of Filfla |
| 24 | 21 April 1942 | 09:22? (Note: According to Mathews and Foreman claimed at 09:02.) | P-40 | | | | | | |
– 6. Staffel of Jagdgeschwader 53 – Mediterranean Theater — 1 January – 15 October 1943
| 33 | 20 March 1943 | 11:56 | P-38 | PQ 13 Ost 1849 | 41 | 8 July 1943 | 16:14 | P-40 | 10 km (6.2 mi) south of Sciacca |
| 34 | 20 March 1943 | 12:04 | P-38 | PQ 13 Ost 1849 | 42 | 12 August 1943 | 13:13 | P-38 | 7 km (4.3 mi) southwest of Ventotene |
| 35 | 7 April 1943 | 19:06 | Spitfire | Majaz al Bab | 43 | 19 August 1943 | 12:25 | B-17 | 15 km (9.3 mi) northeast of Salerno |
| 36 | 19 April 1943 | 15:59 | P-40 | 10 km (6.2 mi) northwest of Zembra | 44 | 20 August 1943 | 12:44 | P-38 | 5 km (3.1 mi) south of Lago Patria |
| 37 | 21 April 1943 | 09:32 | Spitfire | 15 km (9.3 mi) west of Majaz al Bab | ? (Note: This claim is not listed by Prien, Stemmer, Rodeike and Bock.) | 22 August 1943 | 12:23 | B-26 | 105 km (65 mi) southwest of Capri |
| ? | 7 May 1943 | 19:06 | Spitfire | | 45 | 22 August 1943 | 12:25? (Note: According to Mathews and Foreman claimed at 12:26.) | P-51 | 110 km (68 mi) southwest of Capri |
| 38 | 21 May 1943 | 06:42? (Note: According to Mathews and Foreman claimed at 06:32.) | Spitfire | 10 km (6.2 mi) northeast of La Valetta | 46 | 29 August 1943 | 13:50 | P-38? (Note: According to Mathews and Foreman claimed as a Supermarine Spitfire.) | 100 km (62 mi) southwest of Capri |
| 39 | 21 May 1943 | 06:43? (Note: According to Mathews and Foreman claimed at 06:42.) | Spitfire | 15 km (9.3 mi) north of Marsa Loxx; 15 km (9.3 mi) north of Marsa Scala | 47 | 2 September 1943 | 13:37 | P-38 | south of Ischia; 6 km (3.7 mi) southwest of Ventone |
| 40 | 9 June 1943 | 14:03 | P-38 | southwest of Pantelleria | | | | | |
– 6. Staffel of Jagdgeschwader 53 – Defense of the Reich — 1 January – 8 March 1944
| 48 | 30 January 1944 | 12:31? (Note: According to Mathews and Foreman claimed at 12:32.) | B-24 | south of Udine | 49 | 24 February 1944 | 13:08 | B-17 | 10 km (6.2 mi) south of Wels |

=== Awards ===
- Iron Cross (1939) 2nd and 1st Class
- Honor Goblet of the Luftwaffe on 19 October 1941 as Feldwebel and pilot
- German Cross in Gold on 9 September 1942 as Oberfeldwebel in the I./Jagdgeschwader 53
- Knight's Cross of the Iron Cross on 6 April 1944 as Oberfeldwebel and pilot in the 6./Jagdgeschwader 53
