= Mervyn Shipard =

Australian flying ace of WWII

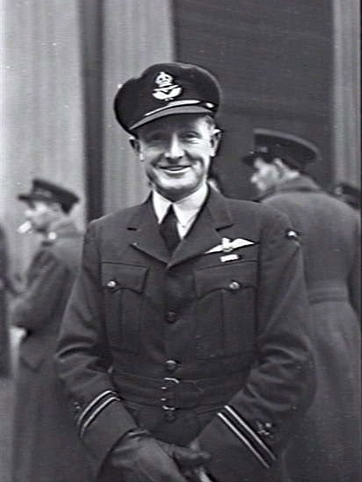
- Born: 24 July 1917; Albury, New South Wales, Australia
- Died: 1 March 2003 (aged 85)
- Military career
- Allegiance: Australia
- Branch: Royal Australian Air Force
- Service years: 1940–1944
- Rank: Flight Lieutenant
- Units: No. 68 Squadron; No. 89 Squadron
- Conflicts: Second World War: Siege of Malta
- Awards: Distinguished Flying Cross and Bar
- Other work: Airline pilot

Mervyn Shipard, DFC & Bar (24 July 1917 – 1 March 2003) was an Australian flying ace of the Royal Australian Air Force (RAAF) during the Second World War. He is credited with the destruction of at least thirteen aircraft.

From Albury, Shipard joined the RAAF in July 1940. After completing his flying training, he was sent to the United Kingdom to serve with the Royal Air Force. Training as a night fighter pilot, he was paired with Douglas Oxby as his radar operator. Flying the Bristol Beaufighter heavy fighter, the pair achieved considerable success while serving first with No. 68 Squadron in the United Kingdom and then No. 89 Squadron over Egypt, Malta and Libya. He served as an instructor from June 1943 until his repatriation to Australia at the end of that year. He performed instructing duties for much of 1944 until his resignation from the RAAF. In civilian life he flew for Australian National Airways and then Qantas until retiring from flying in 1973. He died in 2003, aged 85.

== Early life ==
Mervyn Shipard was born on 24 July 1917 in Albury, New South Wales, in Australia. He was working as a clerk and auctioneer in a stockyard at Henty when he joined the Royal Australian Air Force (RAAF) in July 1940.

== Second World War ==
After initial training in Australia, Shipard proceeded to Canada for advanced flying training. In April 1941 he arrived in the United Kingdom as a pilot officer to serve with the Royal Air Force (RAF). After attending No. 54 Operational Training Unit (OTU) at Church Fenton for training in night fighting duties, he was paired with Sergeant Douglas Oxby. They were posted to No. 68 Squadron in August. This was based at High Ercall in the Midlands and operated the Bristol Beaufighter heavy fighter on night fighting duties. On the night of 1–2 November, Shipard destroyed a Heinkel He 111 medium bomber over Anglesey.

At the end of the year Shipard and Oxby were due to be rested. However, they preferred to remain on operations so volunteered for service in the Middle East. In early 1942, they were posted to No. 89 Squadron. This was based in Egypt at Abu Sueir and, like their previous unit, was equipped with the Beaufighter. It carried out night patrols over the Nile Delta. In June Shipard and Oxby's 'C Flight' was dispatched to Malta, to form part of the besieged island's night time defences.

=== Malta ===
The duo quickly achieved success, destroying a Junkers Ju 88 medium bomber off Mġarr on the night of 7–8 July. This was followed several nights later, on 19–20 July, with the destruction of another Ju 88, of Kampfgeschwader 54 (Bomber Wing 54), over Malta. A further Ju 88 was shot down by Shipard and Oxby on the night of 21–22 July. A Junkers Ju 87 dive bomber of the Regia Aeronautica (Royal Italian Air Force) was damaged by the pair on the night of 24–25 July.

A change in tactics by the Luftwaffe affected Shipard and Oxby's success rate and it was not until October that they made another claim. On the night of 11–12 October, they destroyed a He 111 of Kampfgruppe 100 (Combat Group 100), claiming a second as probably shot down although the latter was probably a Ju 88 of Kampfgeschwader 77. The next night, Shipard and Oxby combined to shoot down a He 111 of KG100. This was followed by the destruction of another He 111 to the east of Malta on the night of 14–15 October.

=== Egypt and Libya ===
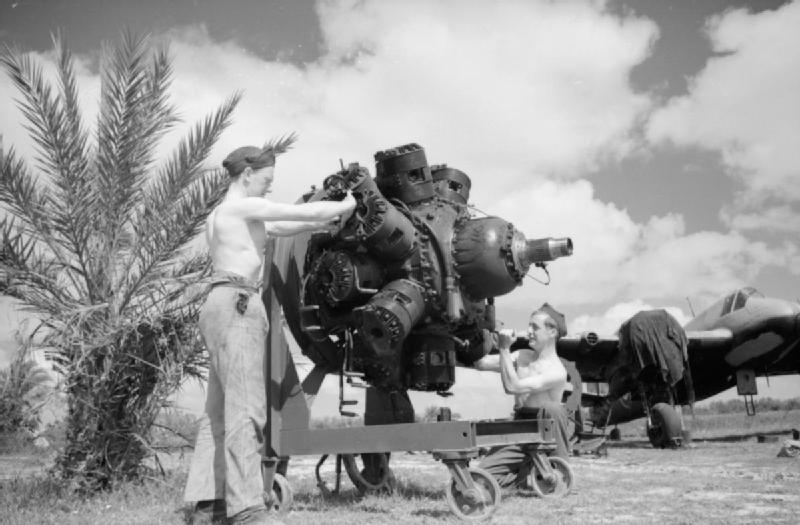
An engine of Shipard's Bristol Beaufighter night fighter being worked on a Libyan airfield

Shortly afterwards, 'C Flight' returned to Egypt. At the start of December, Shipard, now holding the rank of flying officer, and Oxby were part of a detachment sent to Bu Amud to assist in the defence of Tobruk. They destroyed a pair of Ju 88s to the north of Tobruk on the night of 12–13 December. Early the following year, on the night of 7–8 January 1943, the pair claimed two He 111s as damaged over Bu Amud. The next night, they destroyed a Ju 88 and a He 111, also near Bu Amud. They destroyed two Ju 88s near Kambut on the night of 16–17 January. The squadron began operating from Benina, flying over Benghazi, from the end of the month. As a result of his successes while serving in Malta, Shipard was duly awarded the Distinguished Flying Cross (DFC); (Note: Oxby, already a holder of the Distinguished Flying Medal since the previous December, was awarded a Bar to this medal at the same time.) the citation, published in The London Gazette, read:

Flying Officer Shipard has always shown great courage and devotion to duty. While serving in Malta his keenness to participate in operational flying has been a splendid example to all air crews. He has destroyed 4 enemy aircraft by night.

— London Gazette, No. 35904, 16 February 1943

A week after the announcement of Shipard's DFC, he was awarded a Bar to his DFC. This took into account the successes he achieved the previous month while based at Bu Amud. The published citation read:

This officer is a resolute and skilful pilot. Since the beginning of December, 1942, he has destroyed 6 enemy aircraft at night, bringing his total victories to 13. His great keenness and devotion to duty have been worthy of high praise.

— London Gazette, No. 35914, 23 February 1943

Shipard's final aerial victory was on the nght of 2–3 March, when he probably destroyed a Ju to the northeast of Tripoli. In June he and Oxby were repatriated to England and they went their separate ways; Oxby to train radar operators (Note: Oxby became the RAF's most successful radar operator of the Second World War, deemed to have contributed to 21 destroyed aircraft while flying with Shipard and later Wing Commander Wilfrith Green.) while Shipard went to No. 54 OTU as an instructor. He briefly attended the Central Gunnery School at Sutton Bridge and converted to Supermarine Spitfire fighters in anticipation of being given command of a training flight at No. 54 OTU. At the end of the year, Shipard was repatriated to Australia. Disgruntled at being given only two weeks of leave after his extensive service overseas, he resigned as a flight lieutenant from the RAAF in November 1944. Prior to this, he was an instructor at No. 2 OTU.

== Later life ==
Returning to civilian life, Shipard found employment as a pilot with Australian National Airways. In 1954, he commenced working for Qantas. He retired in 1973 at the age of 55 by which time he had accumulated 23,000 hours of flying time. He lived in New South Wales in his retirement and died on 1 March 2003. There is a memorial to him at Henty Memorial Park in Henty.

Shipard is credited with having destroyed thirteen aircraft and damaged three others. He is believed to have also probably destroyed two aircraft.
