= Göttlesbrunn-Arbesthal =

- Municipality
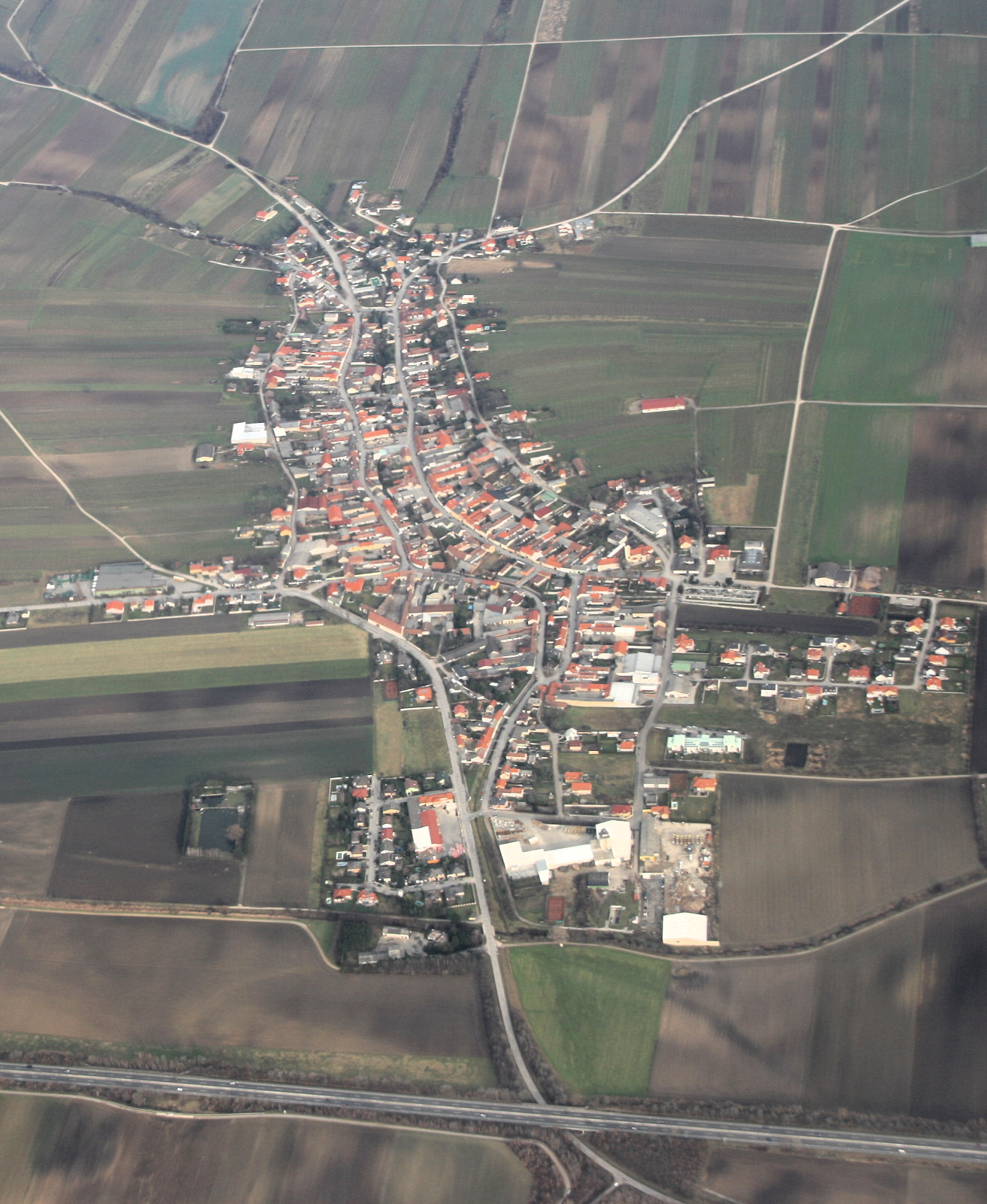
- Aerial view of Göttlesbrunn

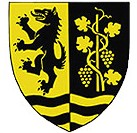
- Coat of arms

- Location within Austria
- Coordinates: 48°2′N 16°43′E
- Country: Austria
- State: Lower Austria
- District: Bruck an der Leitha

Government
  - Mayor: Walter Glatzer

Area
  - Total: 26.26 km^{2} (10.14 sq mi)
- Elevation: 171 m (561 ft)

Population (2018-01-01)
  - Total: 1,411
  - Density: 53.73/km^{2} (139.2/sq mi)
- Time zone: UTC+1 (CET)
  - Summer (DST): UTC+2 (CEST)
- Postal code: 2464
- Area code: 02162
- Website: www.goettlesbrunn-arbesthal.com

Göttlesbrunn-Arbesthal is a town in the district of Bruck an der Leitha in Lower Austria in Austria.

== Population ==
Historical population
Year	Pop.	±%
1869	1,374	—
1910	1,430	+4.1%
1961	1,077	−24.7%
1971	1,090	+1.2%
1981	1,104	+1.3%
1991	1,209	+9.5%
2001	1,311	+8.4%
2011	1,389	+5.9%
2021	1,450	+4.4%
