= Mikhail Pivovarov =

Hero of the Soviet Union

Mikhail Yevdokimovich Pivovarov
- Михаил Евдокимович Пивоваров
- Born: 7 January 1919; Novy Egorlyk, Medvezhensky Uyezd, Stavropol Governorate, Russian SFSR
- Died: 15 May 1949 (aged 30); Uzbek SSR, Soviet Union
- Military career
- Allegiance: Soviet Union
- Branch: Soviet Air Force
- Service years: 1937—1949
- Rank: Captain
- Unit: 402nd Fighter Aviation Regiment
- Commands: 402nd Fighter Aviation Regiment
- Conflicts: World War II
- Awards: Hero of the Soviet Union

Mikhail Yevdokimovich Pivovarov (Russian: Михаил Евдокимович Пивоваров; 7 January 1919 – 15 May 1949) was a Soviet fighter pilot and squadron commander of the 402nd Fighter Aviation Regiment during World War II who was credited with 40 solo and one shared aerial victories.

== Early life ==
Pivovarov was born in the village of Novy Egorlyk, on 7 January 1919. In 1937, he graduated from the 10th grade of school at a state farm in the village of Gigant in Salsky District of Rostov Oblast.

== Military career ==
He joined the Red Army in September 1937. In 1939, he graduated from the Chkalov anti-aircraft artillery school in Orenburg. Till June 1941, he served as a platoon commander of an anti-aircraft artillery battalion. Following the outbreak of Operation Barbarossa in June 1941, he entered the Krasnodar Military Aviation School. In 1942, he graduated from the Ulyanovsk Military Aviation Pilot School. He later graduated from the courses for flight commanders in 1943. He became a member of the Communist Party of Soviet Union in 1944.

Pikvovarov started flying Yak-1s with the 402nd Fighter Aviation Regiment. During this time, he scored his first three aerial victories. In the spring of 1944, he took part in the Crimean offensive. During this time, he scored several aerial victories. On 13 April 1944, he shot down two Luftwaffe Bf 109s, in a dogfight. At the end of June, the regiment was transferred to the 3rd Belorussian Front, where its pilots provided cover and air support for units of the 5th Army and the 3rd Guards Mechanized Corps.

Possessing exceptional piloting techniques, Pivovarov was daring, resourceful, and proactive in battles. As a fighter pilot and observer, he was highly regarded by the corps commander Yevgeny Savitsky, who repeatedly invited him on reconnaissance flights. In one of these reconnaissance flights, they were involved in an aerial battle with 12 Fw 190 fighters. Having struck up a dogfight in an extremely low altitude, they managed to shoot down a Fokker C.V.

In September 1944, the regiment was re-equipped with the Yak-3, and Senior lieutenant Pivovarov was appointed squadron commander. He took part in the battles for the liberation of Poland, Belarus and Donbas, and in the East Pomeranian and Berlin offensives. Pivovarov scored his last aerial victories in the spring of 1945. In early March 1945, he shot down 2 enemy aircraft and on April 18, he shot down 2 more enemy aircraft.

His final tally accumulated through the course of approximately 350 sorties and 80 dogfights officially stands at 40 solo and one shared shootdowns, while flying Yak-1, Yak-3 and Yak-9. For courage and heroism shown in battles against the Nazi invaders, by the decree of the Presidium of the Supreme Soviet of the USSR of 15 May 1946, Pivovarov was awarded the title of Hero of the Soviet Union with the Order of Lenin and the Gold Star medal.

== Post war ==
After the war, he continued to serve in the combat units of the Air Force within the Group of Soviet Forces in Germany. Promoted to the rank of captain in 1945, he served as squadron commander and assistant commander of a fighter aviation regiment. In November 1948, he graduated from the higher officer flight tactical training courses in Lipetsk. He was appointed deputy commander of the 150th Guards Fighter Aviation Regiment in the Central Asian Military District. After a serious accident, he was in reserves.

Pivovarov committed suicide on 15 May 1949, at the age of 30. He is buried at a cemetery in the city of Chirchik, Uzbekistan.

== Awards and honors ==
Hero of the Soviet Union (15 May 1946)
Order of Lenin (15 May 1946)
Order of the Red Banner, three times (April 1944, August 1944, 1945)
Order of Alexander Nevsky (1945)
Order of the Red Star (1944)
Medal "For Battle Merit"
Medal "For the Liberation of Warsaw" (1945)
Medal "For the Capture of Berlin" (1945)
Medal "For the Victory over Germany in the Great Patriotic War 1941–1945" (1945)
Jubilee Medal "30 Years of the Soviet Army and Navy" (1948)

His name is inscribed at a monument in his village of Novy Egorlyk. There are streets named after him in Salsk and Rostov-on-Don. A memorial plaque was installed on the building of school no#62 at the village of Novy Egorlyk, where he had studied. On the Alley of Heroes of the Freedom Square in Salsk, there is a commemorative stele honoring Pivovarov.
