= Ivan Babak =

Soviet military personnel (1919–2001)

Ivan Ilyich Babak
- Born: 26 July 1919; Oleksiyivka, Yekaterinoslav Governorate, Ukrainian National Republic
- Died: 24 June 2001 (aged 81); Poltava, Ukraine
- Military career
- Allegiance: Soviet Union
- Branch: Red Army Air Forces (later Soviet Air Forces)
- Service years: 1940–1949
- Rank: Captain
- Commands: 16th Guards Fighter Aviation Regiment; 32nd Guards Fighter Aviation Regiment
- Conflicts: World War II
- Awards: Hero of the Soviet Union; Order of Lenin; Order of the Red Banner (2); Order of the Patriotic War, 1st class; Order of the Red Star
- Other work: Educator

Ivan Ilyich Babak (Ukrainian: Іван Ілліч Бабак, Russian: Ива́н Ильи́ч Баба́к; 26 July 1919 – 24 June 2001) was a Ukrainian Soviet Air Forces captain, flying ace, and a Hero of the Soviet Union.

A schoolteacher, Babak joined the Red Army before Operation Barbarossa, the German invasion of the Soviet Union, began, and completed pilot training in 1942, after which he flew the Yakovlev Yak-1 and later the Bell P-39 Airacobra. He distinguished himself in the air battles over the Kuban bridgehead in April 1943 and was credited with eighteen aerial victories when he received the title Hero of the Soviet Union on 1 November, after spending the northern hemisphere summer in the hospital due to malaria. Babak briefly returned to combat but was again sidelined by a recurrence of malaria, going back into combat in mid-1944. In mid-March 1945 Babak took command of the 16th Guards Fighter Aviation Regiment but was downed by anti-aircraft fire and captured days later. He survived captivity and was released at the end of the war, but as a result of being captured, he was not awarded the Hero of the Soviet Union title a second time. Credited with 37 aerial victories in official Soviet accounts, Babak commanded a regiment postwar and retired in 1949, after which he returned to teaching.

== Early life ==
Babak was born on 26 July 1919 to a peasant family in the village of Oleksiyivka, Yekaterinoslav Governorate (now in Nikopol Raion, Dnipropetrovsk Oblast), then controlled by the Ukrainian National Republic, though it was under Soviet control by the end of the year. A graduate of the Zaporizhia Pedagogical Institute and a flying club, he taught chemistry and biology at the Partizanskoy Secondary School in Prymorsk Raion of Zaporizhia Oblast, before being drafted into the Red Army in October 1940.

== World War II ==
Upon his April 1942 graduation from the Stalingrad Military Aviation School as a sergeant, Babak joined the 45th Fighter Aviation Regiment of the 216th Mixed Aviation Division on the Crimean and North Caucasian Fronts as a Yakovlev Yak-1 pilot in May. His performance was considered unsatisfactory by regimental commander Ibrahim Dzusov, who intended to transfer him, but flying ace Dmitry Kalarash tutored Babak, after which Dmitry Glinka selected him as his wingman. After he claimed his first aerial victory over Mozdok in September, the regiment was sent to Adzhikabul in Azerbaijan for rest and retraining on the United States-supplied Bell P-39 Airacobra fighter, which Babak flew for the remainder of the war.
