= John Yarra =

Australian flying ace (1921–1942)

John William Yarra
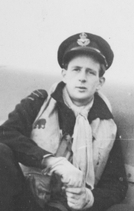
- Born: 24 August 1921; Stanthorpe, Australia
- Died: 10 December 1942 (aged 21); Off the Dutch coast
- Military career
- Allegiance: Australia
- Branch: Royal Australian Air Force
- Rank: Flight Lieutenant
- Units: No. 453 Squadron; No. 185 Squadron
- Conflicts: Second World War; Channel Front; Siege of Malta
- Awards: Distinguished Flying Medal

John William Yarra, DFM (24 August 1921 – 10 December 1942) was an Australian flying ace of the Royal Australian Air Force (RAAF) during the Second World War. He was credited with at least twelve aerial victories.

From Queensland, Yarra joined the RAAF in October 1940. Sent to the United Kingdom to serve with the Royal Air Force after his training was completed, he was posted to No. 232 Squadron before proceeding on to No. 64 Squadron. In February 1942, he was dispatched to the Mediterranean theatre to deliver Supermarine Spitfire fighters for reinforcement of Malta's aerial defences. Once on Malta, he flew with No. 185 Squadron and achieved several aerial victories. He returned to the United Kingdom in July and was soon posted to the RAAF's No. 453 Squadron as one of its flight commanders. He was killed while attacking German shipping off the Dutch coast.

== Early life ==
Born in Stanthorpe in Queensland, Australia, on 24 August 1921, John William Yarra was the son of Alfred and Harriet Yarra. His father, a journalist, was a former soldier who had served in the Australian Imperial Force and had been awarded the Military Medal. He later moved with his family to Grafton in New South Wales and Yarra was educated at Grafton High School. After completing his education, he worked at The Daily Examiner, the same newspaper that his father worked for, as a printing apprentice.

== Second World War ==
Yarra joined the Royal Australian Air Force (RAAF) in October 1940 and after his initial training, he went to Canada for further flight instruction. Completing his training in August 1941, he was sent to the United Kingdom to serve with the Royal Air Force. He spent a period of time at No. 55 Operational Training Unit, where he learnt to fly the Supermarine Spitfire fighter aircraft and then, holding the rank of sergeant, he was posted to No. 232 Squadron in October. Despite his training in Spitfires, his new squadron operated the Hawker Hurricane fighter. However, the squadron was taken off operations soon afterwards and he was subsequently transferred to No. 64 Squadron, which operated Spitfires from Hornchurch in sweeps and bomber escort missions to France. In February 1942 he was one of several pilots selected to deliver Spitfires to Malta.

=== Malta ===
Sailing aboard the 5,000-ton steamer Cape Hawke along with several crated Spitfires, Yarra arrived at Gibraltar where he and 16 other pilots were transferred to HMS Eagle, the aircraft carrier from which they were to fly the Spitfires to Malta. The Eagle left Gibraltar on 26 February but a fault with the external fuel drop tanks that were fitted to the Spitfires to increase their range saw the ship return to remedy the issue. Once the drop tanks had been fixed, the Eagle sailed on 5 March. Two days later, having reached a point 700 miles to the west of Malta, 15 pilots flew their Spitfires off the deck of the carrier to the island. However Yarra was not among them; his Spitfire was one of two that had developed faults and were left behind. The Eagle went back to Gibraltar where in due course, more pilots and Spitfires were embarked. Yarra was one of nine that flew Spitfires to Malta on 21 March.

The Spitfires flown in on 21 March were to form the nucleus of a re-formed No. 126 Squadron alongside No. 249 Squadron, which was equipped with the Spitfires that had arrived on 7 March. However, the latter had lost a number of aircraft over the previous few days and so the two units had to share the newly arrived Spitfires. This left a surplus of Spitfire pilots, including Yarra. As he had some experience flying Hurricanes due to his previous service with No. 232 Squadron, he was transferred to No. 185 Squadron, which was equipped with this type of aircraft, a week after his arrival at Malta. He claimed a Junkers Ju 88 medium bomber as probably destroyed during a nighttime flight on 1 May. When more Spitfires arrived at Malta on 9 May, some were provided to the squadron and Yarra begin flying these. He destroyed a Messerschmitt Bf 109 fighter on 12 May having earlier engaged a Ju 88 without success. Two days later he had to crash land after receiving damage in an engagement with the Luftwaffe (German Air Force). On 15 May he was credited with shooting down two Macchi MC.202 fighters of the Regia Aeronautica (Italian Air Force) and damaging a Bf 109. Yarra noted in his diary that when he shot it down, one of the MC.202s had collided with the other.

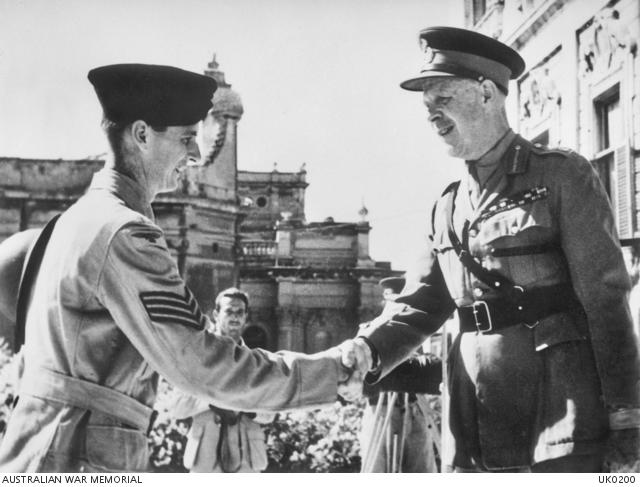
Yarra receiving his Distinguished Flying Medal from Lord Gort, the Governor of Malta, on 10 July 1942

Yarra shot down two more Bf 109s on 18 May, although some accounts report one of these as probably destroyed rather than being a definite aerial victory. (Note: The pilot of the first Bf 109 bailed out and was rescued by a launch of the Royal Navy, becoming a prisoner of war. In his logbook, Yarra recorded the second Bf 109 as also destroyed but historians Christopher Shores and Clive Williams indicate that some records list it as a probable. Another historian, Brian Cull, does identify the Bf 109 as a probable.) He had to crash land again on 20 May. His aerial success continued into June; on the first of the month, he shot down a Bf 109 and a week later damaged two Reggiane Re.2001 fighters. By this time, he was commissioned as a flying officer. He was duly awarded the Distinguished Flying Medal (DFM); the citation, published in The London Gazette, read:

This pilot has shot down 4 enemy aircraft in air battles. On one occasion, when protecting a rescue launch in the face of numerous enemy aircraft, he shot down 1 Messerschmitt and probably destroyed another. When his ammunition was exhausted he made feint attacks and kept the enemy at bay for three quarters of an hour.

— London Gazette, No. 35597, 16 June 1942

On 16 June, the same day that his DFM was officially announced, Yarra was credited with a Bf 109 destroyed although at the time, he recorded his claim as a damaged aircraft. Two Bf 109s were shot down by Yarra on 21 June and the same day he damaged a Ju 88. Another Ju 88 was destroyed by Yarra on 5 July, and he also claimed two Bf 109s; one as probably destroyed and the other damaged. Two days later he claimed to have destroyed two Re2001s (Note: Shores and Williams notes that one of these was actually an MC.202.) and on 11 July shot down a Bf 109. His time at Malta then drew to a close, his last sortie being made on 14 July. He was transferred back to the United Kingdom for a period of leave.

=== Channel Front ===
The RAAF's No. 453 Squadron had originally been raised for service in British Malaya and was subsequently disbanded after the Fall of Singapore. It began reforming at Drem in June 1942 with mostly novice RAAF pilots although the senior positions were held by experienced RAF officers. Focus was on training initially and in July the squadron became operational. From August, it began patrolling over the Firth of Forth and then, the following month, the squadron shifted south to Hornchurch, where it became part of No. 11 Group. Yarra joined the squadron at this time as a flight lieutenant and took command of one of its flights. His younger brother Robert was also a pilot with the squadron.

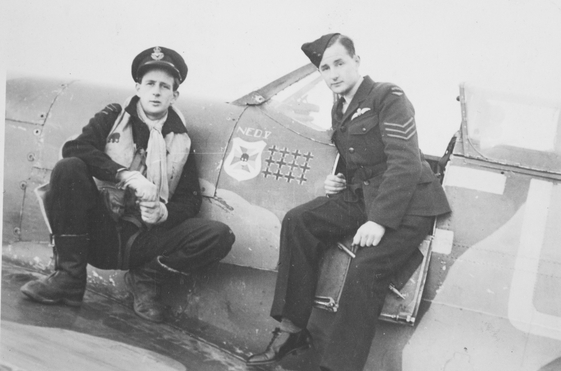
John Yarra, on the left, squatting on the wing of his Spitfire, while his brother Robert leans against the aircraft's cockpit. The pair were serving with No. 453 Squadron at the time

At the time, No. 453 Squadron operated Spitfire Mark Vbs, which were inferior to the Focke-Wulf Fw 190s that were flown by many of the Luftwaffe fighter squadrons based in France. This limited the Australians to providing high cover for bombers attacking targets in France, diversionary operations, or defensive patrols over the southeast coast of England. During December, the squadron was tasked with attacking shipping. In its only action of the month, on 10 December, Yarra led a flight of six Spitfires in an attack on a flotilla of four vessels near Flushing. Although one ship was damaged, Yarra and another pilot were shot down and killed by fire from a flak ship that was accompanying the flotilla. He has no known grave and is commemorated on the Runneymeade Memorial at Englefield Green. He is credited with twelve aircraft destroyed, two probably destroyed, and six damaged.

His brother Robert was also killed while flying with No. 453 Squadron. His death occurred in April 1944 during an operation to Abbeville in France. Another brother served with the Australian Army.
