= James S. Varnell Jr. =

American fighter ace

James Sullins Varnell Jr.
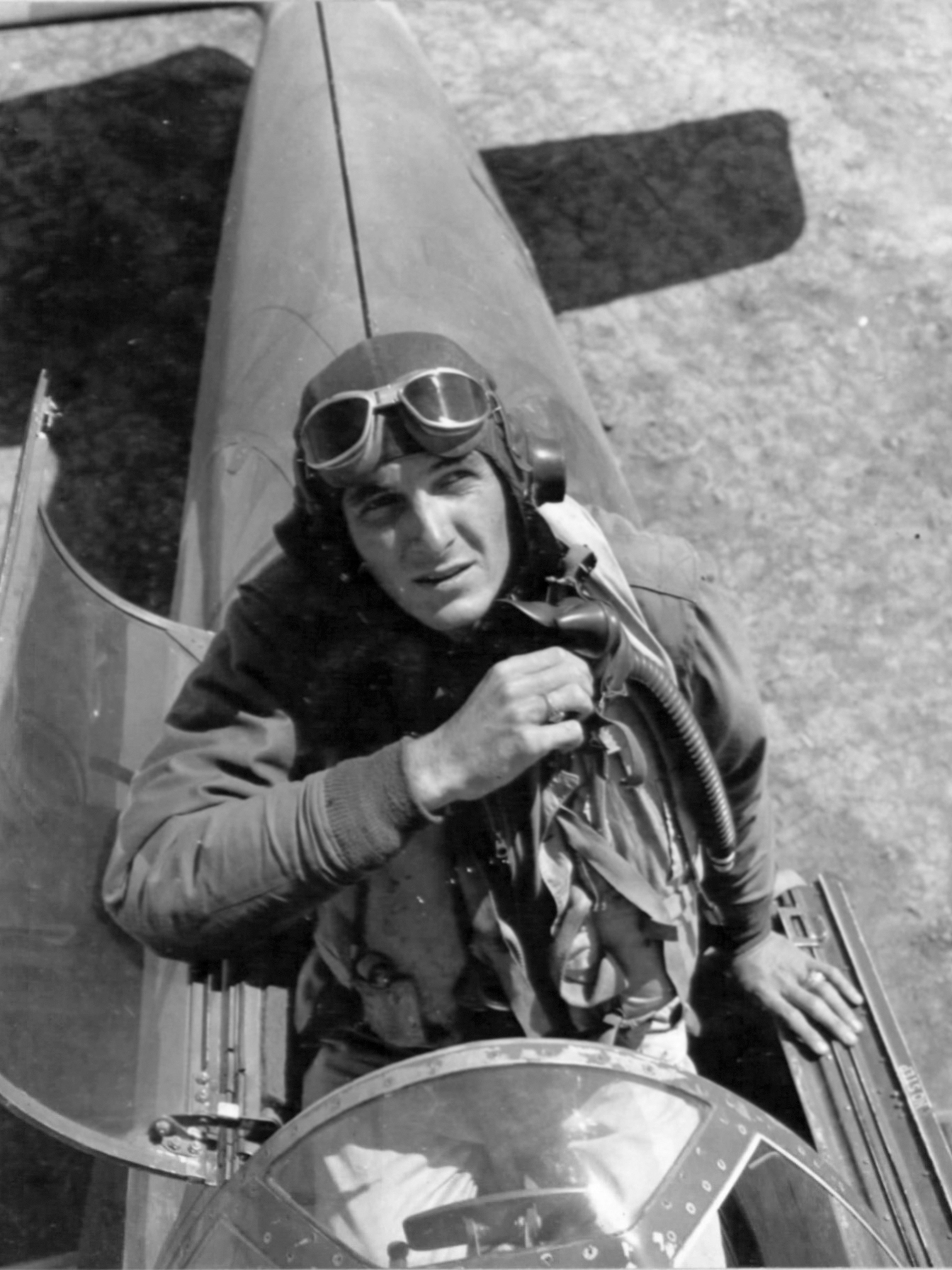
- Lt. James S. Varnell in his P-51 Mustang "Little Eva"
- Born: December 9, 1921; Charleston, Tennessee
- Died: April 9, 1945 (aged 23); Pinellas Army Air Field
- Burial place: Calhoun, Tennessee
- Military career
- Branch: United States Army Air Forces
- Rank: Major
- Nickname: "Sully"
- Service number: O-798378
- Unit: 52nd Fighter Group
- Awards: Air Medal; American Campaign Medal; Distinguished Flying Cross; Silver Star; World War II Victory Medal; European-African-Middle Eastern Campaign Medal

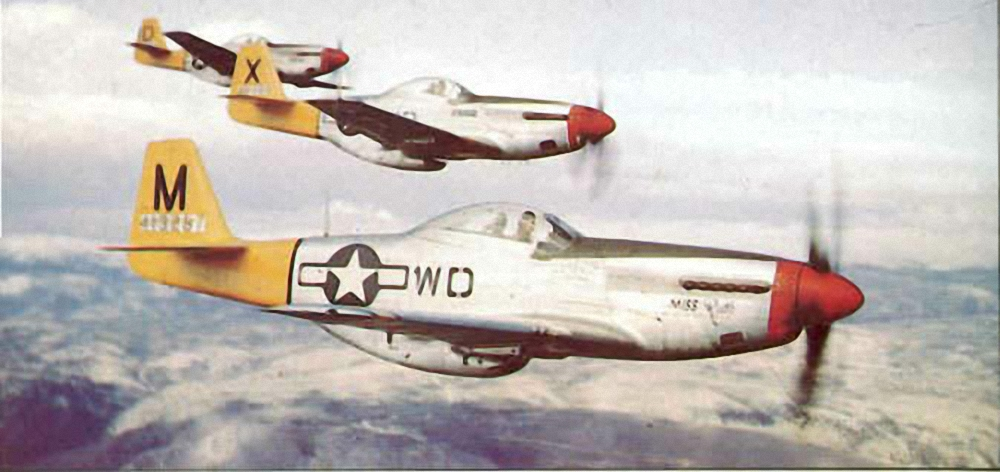
P-51 Mustangs of the 52nd Fighter Group

James Sullins Varnell Jr. (December 9, 1921 – April 9, 1945) was a United States Army Air Forces fighter ace who was credited with shooting down 17 aircraft during World War II; he was the top ace of the 52nd Fighter Group.

== See also ==
- RAF Goxhill
- Richard L. Alexander
