= William Henry Franklin =

- Born: William Henry Franklin; 2 October 1911; Mile End, London, England
- Died: 12 December 1940 (aged 29); English Channel, off Selsey, Sussex, England
- Burial place: Runnymede Memorial, England
- Relatives: Louise Eliza Kogel (married March 1937)
- Military career
- Allegiance: United Kingdom
- Branch: Royal Air Force
- Service years: 1928-1940
- Rank: Pilot Officer
- Nickname: Bill
- Service number: 562984 (airman); 44753 (officer)
- Unit: No. 65 Squadron RAF
- Conflicts: Second World War: European air campaign; Battle of Britain; The Blitz †; Western Front; Battle of France; Operation Dynamo
- Awards: Distinguished Flying Medal & Bar

William Henry Franklin, DFM and Bar (2 October 1911 – 12 December 1940) also known as Bill Franklin was a Royal Air Force fighter pilot and a notable Second World War flying ace decorated for gallantry twice, he shot down more than 13 enemy aircraft over the Dunkirk evacuation beaches and during the Battle of Britain before being killed in action.

== Early life ==
William Franklin was born at Mile End, London, England on 2 October 1911, the son of Harriett Amelia (née Parker) and George Franklin, George was a wire splicer. His father was killed in action in France in 1917 with the King's Royal Rifle Corps Franklin was educated at Thomas Street Central School, Limehouse.

== Royal Air Force ==
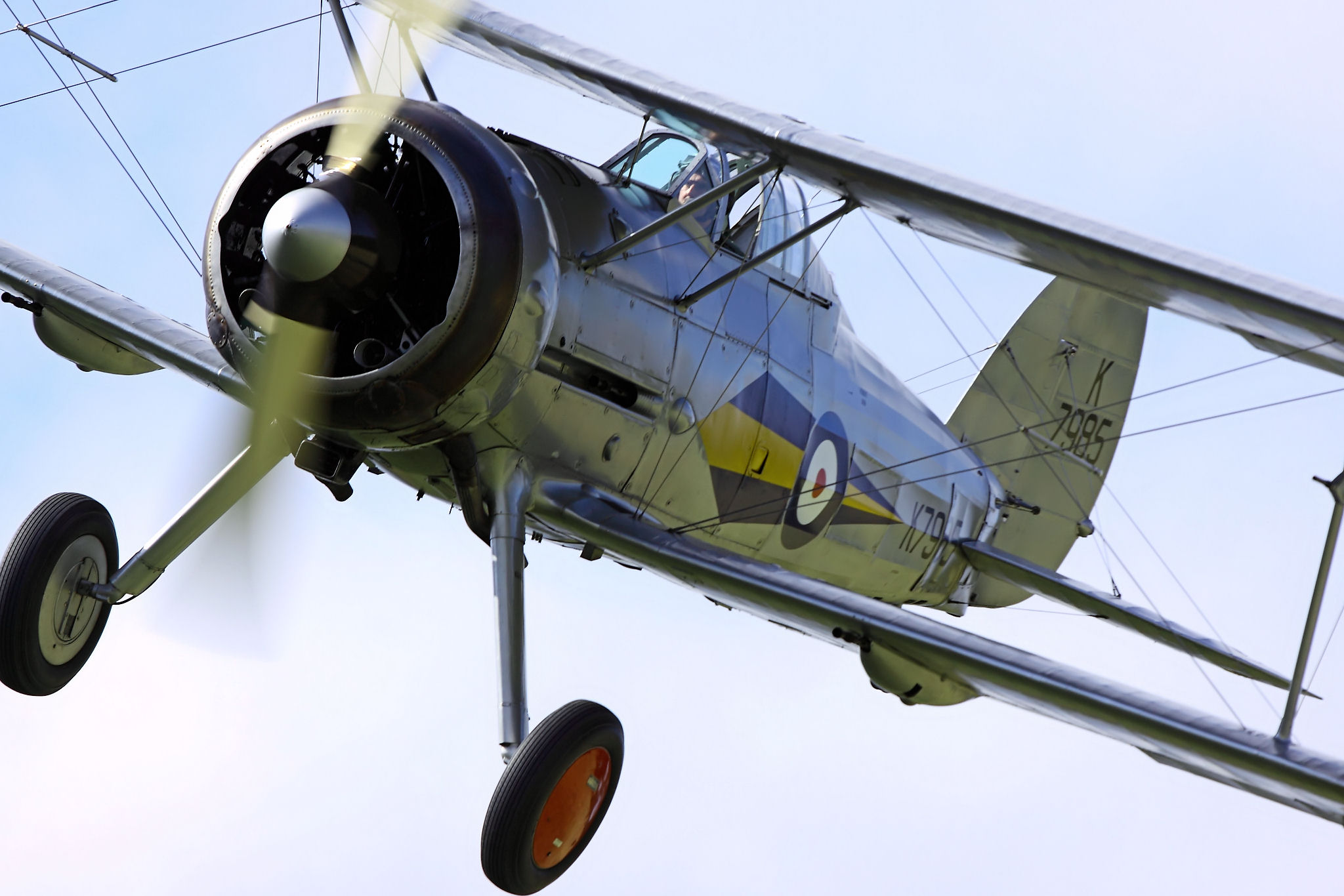
Gloster Gladiator I at Shuttleworth Airshow, 2010

In January 1929 Franklin joined the Royal Air Force as an aircraft apprentice with the service number 562984 and passed out from the No. 1 School of Technical Training RAF based at RAF Halton in December 1931 as an aircraft engine fitter. After spending time servicing the aircraft he applied for flight training and was accepted. By the early 1930s Franklin had earned his pilot's aircrew brevet, promotion to sergeant followed and he married Louise Eliza Kogel in March 1937 at Poplar in London and very soon afterwards was posted to join "B" Flight of 65 Squadron at RAF Hornchurch flying Gloster Gladiator fighters, one of his fellow pilots was Pilot Officer Robert Stanford Tuck and other young pilot officers were men who would later rise to high rank, some achieving flying ace status. Still commanded by Squadron Leader Desmond Cooke the squadron converted to Supermarine Spitfire Mark I aircraft in March 1939. At the outbreak of war in September 1939 Franklin was an experienced flight sergeant Supermarine Spitfire Mark I pilot still serving with No. 65 Squadron RAF

== The Battle of France and Dunkirk ==
No. 65 Squadron RAF went into action in May 1940 during the Battle of France, Franklin scored several early successes. On 22 May 1940 he shared a Junkers Ju 88 bomber damaged near Calais, on 24 May 1940 he shared in the destruction of a Henschel Hs 126 reconnaissance aircraft which crashed in flames, on 26 May 1940 he destroyed a Messerschmitt Bf 109 fighter and a Messerschmitt Bf 110 twin engine fighter, on 27 May 1940 destroying a Junkers Ju 88 bomber and sharing a Dornier Do 17 bomber. His final success in this period was on 28 May 1940 sharing in the destruction of another Dornier Do 17 over Dunkirk.

On 25 June 1940 he shot down two Messerschmitt Bf 109 fighters over Abbeville. Franklin was awarded the Distinguished Flying Medal on 9 July 1940.

== The Battle of Britain ==
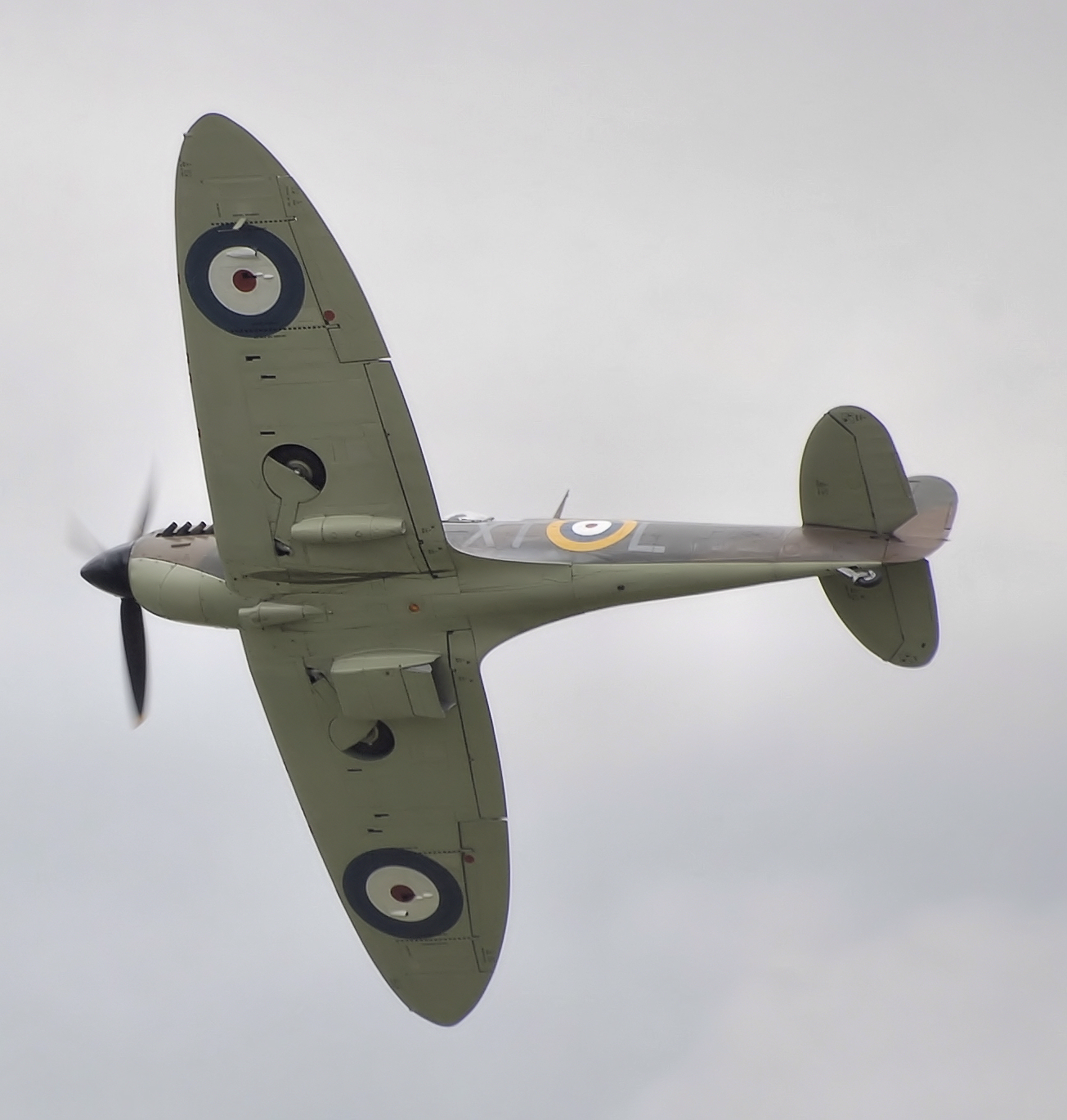
Spitfire Mk IIa P7350 of the BBMF is the only existing airworthy Spitfire that fought in the Battle of Britain.

On 7 July 1940 he claimed two Messerschmitt Bf 109 fighters in the Dover-Folkestone area. Camera gun footage from this date shows Franklin inflicting damage upon a Bf109E (resulting in its starboard landing gear leg descending), but unfortunately the other aircraft engaged is a Hawker Hurricane, a confirmed case of friendly fire that resulted in the death of Squadron Leader J.D.C. Joslin of 79 Squadron, flying Hurricane P2756. No. 65 Squadron lost three pilots during this combat. On the following day off Dover, he claimed another Bf 109 an aircraft of II Gruppe Jagdgeschwader 51, probably flown by Uffz. Konrad Schneideberger of 7./JG 51, who was killed. On 25 July 1940 again off Dover, he allegedly forced down another Bf 109 into the English Channel. This confirmed victory at around 12.45 off Dover is not probable. The only possibility is that he damaged Bf 109E-1 of 5./JG 51 with Uffz. Paul Obst. Pilot was wounded and force-landed at Saint-Inglevert. RAF claimed at least 25 Bf 109s, but only 7 were lost. On 26 July he destroyed another near Folkestone. No match in Luftwaffe records again. On 5 August 1940 he shot down two more Bf 109 fighters in two sorties; one mid-Channel at 09.00, the second off Dover around 15.00. A third was claimed as damaged in the same space of time. One, slightly damaged, may have been flown by leutnant Reinhard Seiler of Jagdgeschwader 54. A second machine from I./JG 54 was damaged from 35%, but the pilot was unhurt. Obfw. Schmid of 1./JG 51 was killed that day by enemy fighters and another machine from 8./JG51 was damaged from 40% and force-landed. RAF Fighter Command claimed 9 destroyed Bf 109, but in reality only one was lost. On 16 August 1940 Franklin was in action with Luftwaffe aircraft off Deal, where he shot down a Bf 109 and damaged a Dornier Do 17.

Franklin was awarded a Bar to the Distinguished Flying Medal on 13 August 1940.

On 20 August 1940 he was posted to RAF Hornchurch base staff due to sickness, but rejoined No. 65 Squadron RAF operationally on 13 October 1940.

Flight Sergeant Franklin was commissioned on 13 October 1940, with effect from 18 September 1940, as pilot officer service number 44753.

== Death ==
On the afternoon of 12 December 1940 Franklin was flying as Green 1 with "B" flight of Supermarine Spitfires of No. 65 Squadron RAF, when they intercepted a reconnaissance Junkers Ju 88 of 4(F)/121 over the sea off Selsey. He was flying Spitfire R6982. Return fire from the bombers air gunners was intense and accurate, shooting down two of the British fighters and enabling the bomber to escape. P/O Merrick Hubert Eric Hine (Green 3) was killed in R6978. Franklin did not return from this mission.

== Honours and awards ==
- Distinguished Flying Medal awarded to No. 562984 Flight Sergeant William Henry Franklin on 9 July 1940.

Citation: During a period of six days in May, 1940, Flight Sergeant Franklin took part in numerous offensive patrols over Northern France and on eight occasions was in combat with the enemy. He has himself shot down one Junkers and two Messerschmitt aircraft and in company with his section he has destroyed three other enemy aircraft. One day in June, 1940, in company with his squadron, Flight Sergeant Franklin engaged fifteen to twenty Messerschmitt 109's and destroyed two. Throughout these engagements he has shown great skill, courage and determination in pressing home his attacks. On one occasion he chased an enemy aircraft more than 20 miles, almost at ground level, before destroying it.

- Bar to the Distinguished Flying Medal awarded to No. 562984 Flight Sergeant William Henry Franklin DFM on 13 August 1940.

Citation: Since 22 May 1940, this airman has shot down ten enemy aircraft and assisted in destroying a further two. On two occasions during these engagements he shot down two Messerschmitt 109's in one sortie. On another occasion, after chasing a Messerschmitt across the Channel to Calais he encountered seven enemy fighters five of which he engaged, destroying one of them. His skill, courage and determination are of the highest order.

== See also ==
- List of World War II flying aces

== Bibliography ==
- Foreman, John (1988). Battle of Britain - the forgotten months. New Malden: Air Research. ISBN 1871187028.
- Foreman, John (1996). The Fighter Command War Diaries. Walton-on-Thames: Air Research. ISBN 1-871187-34-6.
- Foreman, John (2003). RAF Fighter Command Victory Claims, Part One. Walton-on-Thames: Red Kite. ISBN 0-9538061-8-9.
- Foreman, John (2005). RAF Fighter Command Victory Claims, Part Two. Walton-on-Thames: Red Kite. ISBN 0-9546201-5-1.
- Franks, Norman (1983). The Air Battle of Dunkirk. London: William Kimber. ISBN 0-7183-0349-0.
- Franks, Norman (1997). Royal Air Force Fighter Command Losses, Volume 1. Earl Shilton: Midland Counties. ISBN 1-857800559.
- Mason, Francis (1969). Battle Over Britain. London: McWhirter Brothers. ISBN 0-901928-00-3.
- Ramsey, Winston (1989). Battle of Britain: Then and Now -V. London: After The Battle. ISBN 0-900913-46-0.
- Ramsey, Winston (1989). The Blitz: Then and Now –Volume 2. London: After The Battle. ISBN 0-900913-54-1.
- Shores, Christopher (1994). Aces High. London: Grub Street. ISBN 1-898697-00-0.
- Shores, Christopher (1999). Aces High, Volume 2. London: Grub Street. ISBN 1-898697-00-0.
- Tavender, Ian (1990). The Distinguished Flying Medal. JB Hayward. ISBN 0-903754-47-9.
- Wynn, Kenneth (1989). Men of the Battle of Britain. Norfolk: Gliddon. ISBN 1473847672.
