= Andrey Baklan =

Soviet World War II flying ace

- Андрей Яковлевич Баклан
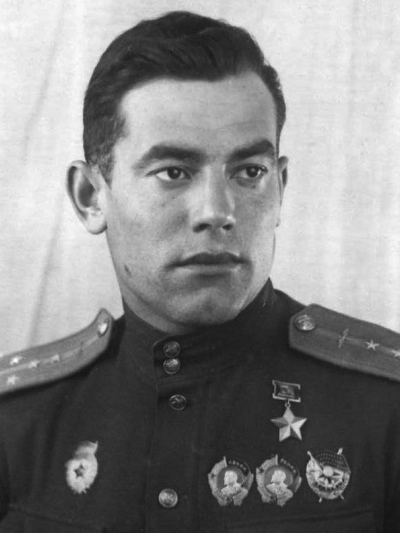
- Born: 23 July [O.S. 10 July] 1917; Kalinovka, Kherson Governorate, Russian Empire
- Died: 20 May 1985 (aged 67); Pskov, USSR
- Military career
- Allegiance: Soviet Union
- Branch: Soviet Air Force
- Service years: 1938—1963
- Rank: Colonel
- Conflicts: Winter War; World War II
- Awards: Hero of the Soviet Union

Andrey Yakovlevich Baklan (Russian: Андрей Яковлевич Баклан; 23 July [O.S. 10 July] 1917 — 20 May 1985) was a Soviet flying ace during World War II. Awarded the title Hero of the Soviet Union on 23 November 1942 for his initial victories, by the end of the war he tallied an estimated 20 solo and 21 shared shootdowns, although more conservative estimates put the figure at 17 solo and one shared.
