= Henry William Brown =

United States Air Force fighter ace

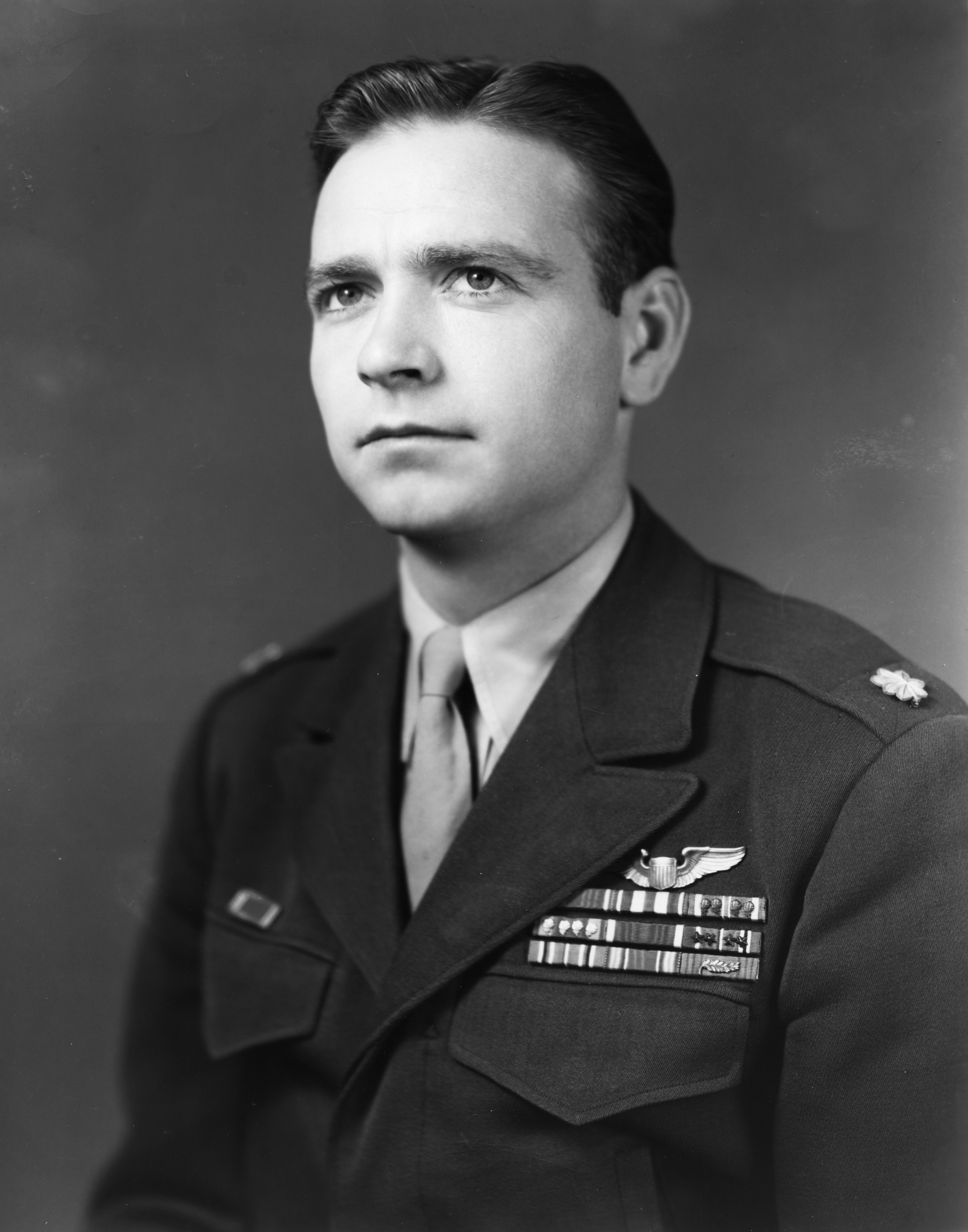
- Henry W. Brown
- Born: January 25, 1923; Dallas, Texas, U.S.
- Died: February 19, 2008 (aged 85); Sumter, South Carolina, U.S.
- Military career
- Allegiance: United States of America
- Branch: United States Army Air Forces; United States Air Force
- Service years: 1942–1974
- Rank: Colonel
- Nickname: "Baby"
- Unit: 355th Fighter Group
- Commands: 48th Tactical Fighter Wing
- Conflicts: World War II; Vietnam War
- Awards: Distinguished Service Cross; Silver Star; Legion of Merit; Distinguished Flying Cross (5); Purple Heart; Air Medal (19)

Henry William Brown (January 25, 1923 – February 19, 2008) was a United States Army Air Force fighter ace who was credited with shooting down fourteen aircraft and destroying another fourteen on the ground during World War II. He retired from the Air Force as a colonel in 1974. He was the highest scoring ace of the 355th Fighter Group.

== Early life ==
Brown was born on January 25, 1923, in Dallas, Texas.

== World War II ==
Brown joined the reserves in December 1941 and attended flight school at Spence Field in Georgia, graduating as a flight officer in March 1943. He was assigned to the 354th Fighter Squadron of the 355th Fighter Group of the Eighth Air Force at RAF Steeple Morden in November 1943.

Brown scored his first four ground kills, while flying the P-47 Thunderbolt, before transitioning to the P-51 Mustang. He was assigned to three different aircraft during his time with the 355th FG, in which his P-47 was named 'Baby' and his P-51B and D were named 'The Hun Hunter Texas'. All of which bore the fuselage identification codes WR: Z.

On March 8, 1944, following a Berlin mission escort, Brown destroyed three Ju 88 and a shared Bf 110, while strafing Hosepe Airfield to become the first Eighth Air Force fighter pilot to destroy more than 3 in one day.

He became the 355 FG's fifth flying ace on April 24, 1944, and led the 355th FG in total air/ground scores on May 13 at the start of the Eighth Air Force campaign against German oil industry.

When Brown returned from stateside leave in late August he was promoted to Captain in September and went on a 30-day rampage, destroying 8 on the ground and 7 in the air to become the Eighth Air Force (active) leading top scorer. He was the first Eighth Air Force pilot to destroy 6 on the ground, during September.

On October 3, 1944, Brown was shot by German flak at Nordlingen Aerodrome. Major Charles Lenfest, CO of 354th Fighter Squadron landed in an attempt to rescue Brown, but became stuck in the wet ground and both were captured. Brown was a Prisoner of War until the end of the war, while Lenfest successfully escaped in April 1945.

Brown remained 355th FG top ace and top scorer. His final score was 14.2 destroyed and 3 damaged in the air, 14.5 destroyed and 10 damaged on the ground.

== Cold War era ==
Brown remained in the Air Force after the war. Brown obtained degree at University of Omaha in 1960.

He headed the F-111 Aardvark program at Nellis Air Force Base. He later commanded the 48th Tactical Fighter Wing and was the deputy Director of Operations for the Seventh Air Force during the Vietnam War, flying combat missions.

He retired from the Air Force in 1974.

== Later life ==
Brown died on February 19, 2008, at Sumter, South Carolina.

== Awards and decorations ==
His awards include:

US Air Force Command Pilot Badge

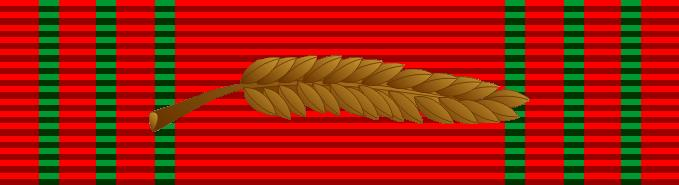
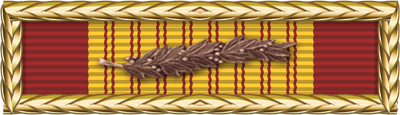
Distinguished Service Cross
Silver Star
Legion of Merit
Distinguished Flying Cross with four bronze oak leaf clusters
Purple Heart
Air Medal with three silver and one bronze oak leaf clusters
Air Medal with bronze oak leaf cluster (second ribbon required for accouterment spacing)
Air Force Commendation Medal
Army Commendation Medal
Air Force Presidential Unit Citation
Army Good Conduct Medal
Air Force Outstanding Unit Award
Prisoner of War Medal
Combat Readiness Medal
American Campaign Medal
European-African-Middle Eastern Campaign Medal with four bronze campaign stars
World War II Victory Medal
National Defense Service Medal with bronze service star
Vietnam Service Medal with bronze campaign star
Air Force Longevity Service Award with silver and two bronze oak leaf clusters
Small Arms Expert Marksmanship Ribbon
Croix de Guerre, with Palm (Belgium)
Vietnam Gallantry Cross Unit Award
Vietnam Campaign Medal
