= Robert B. Westbrook (pilot) =

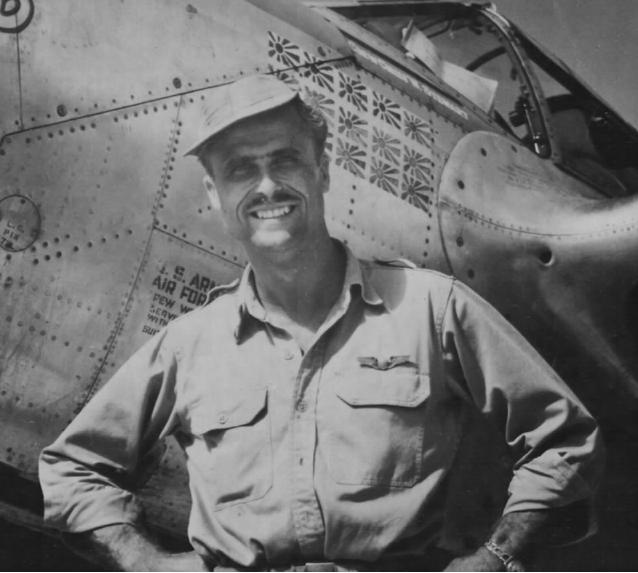
- Born: November 9, 1917; Los Angeles, California, U.S.
- Died: 22 November 1944 (aged 27) off Makassar, Japanese-occupied Dutch East Indies
- Military career
- Allegiance: United States
- Branch: California National Guard; United States Army Air Forces
- Service years: 1930s–1943
- Rank: Lieutenant Colonel
- Nickname: "Westy"
- Commands: 44th Fighter Squadron
- Conflicts: World War II: Pacific War †
- Awards: Distinguished Service Cross; Silver Star (2); Distinguished Flying Cross (2); Air Medal (16)

Robert Burdette Westbrook (9 November 1917 – 22 November 1944) was a United States Army Air Forces lieutenant colonel and a World War II flying ace. Westbrook commanded the 44th Fighter Squadron, and became the leading fighter ace of the Thirteenth Air Force. He is also the ninth ranking fighter ace in the Pacific during World War II and also one of ten United States Army Air Forces pilots who became an ace in two different types of fighter aircraft.

== Early life ==
Westbrook was born in Los Angeles on 9 November 1917, and attended Hollywood High School, where he joined the ROTC and became a cadet captain. After graduating in 1935, Westbrook studied at the University of California, Los Angeles for a year. He became a member of the California National Guard and was federalized along with his unit in March 1941.

== Military career ==
Westbrook applied for United States Army Air Corps flight training later that year and was accepted. He was awarded his wings with Class 42-G at Luke Field, Arizona, on July 26, 1942, and then ordered to Hawaii. On August 15, he joined the 44th Fighter Squadron of the 18th Fighter Group. which was equipped with the Curtiss P-40 Warhawk, at Bellows Field on Oahu.

=== World War II ===
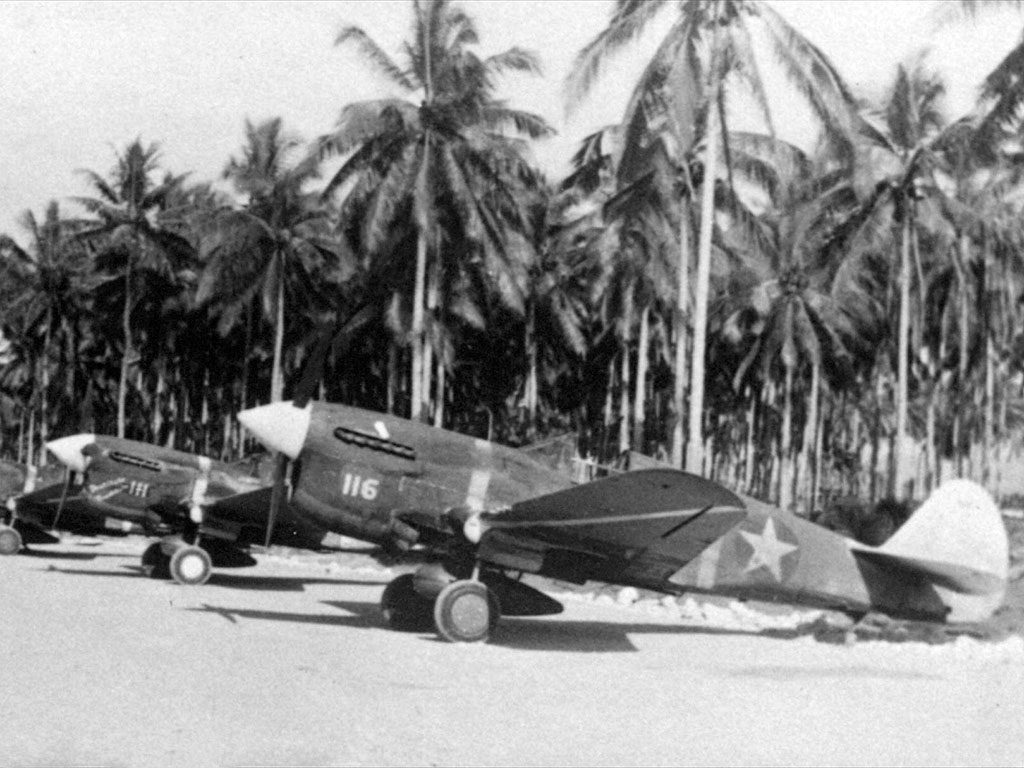
P-40 Warhawks of 44th Fighter Squadron

Westbrook was promoted to first lieutenant in October, and on October 20, the 44th FS pilots and ground crews were transported to New Caledonia. Shortly thereafter, the squadron's P-40s arrived at the port of Espiritu Santo. When the planes were operational, the pilots flew them from Espiritu to their new base on the nearby island of Efate.

The 44th FS became part of the 13th Air Force when it was activated on January 13, 1943. A week later, its pilots flew their planes to Guadalcanal in the Solomon Islands, from which they began flying combat missions. Westbrook scored his first kill on January 13, 1943, when he shot down an A6M Zero, during an intercept of an Imperial Japanese Navy Air Service raid on Guadalcanal consisting of nine Mitsubishi G4M "Betty" bombers escorted by 30 A6M Zeros. On February 14, while flying a bomber escort of B-24 Liberators, Westbrook shot down one enemy fighter, while other P-40 pilots shot down four and probably destroyed two others. Westbrook received his first Silver Star for this mission. On April 14, the 44th FS was assigned at Guadalcanal with the 18th Fighter Group. Westbrook was promoted to captain in early May. On June 7, during an interception of more than 40 A6M Zeroes over Guadalcanal, he shot down two Zeroes, bringing his total to four aerial victories.

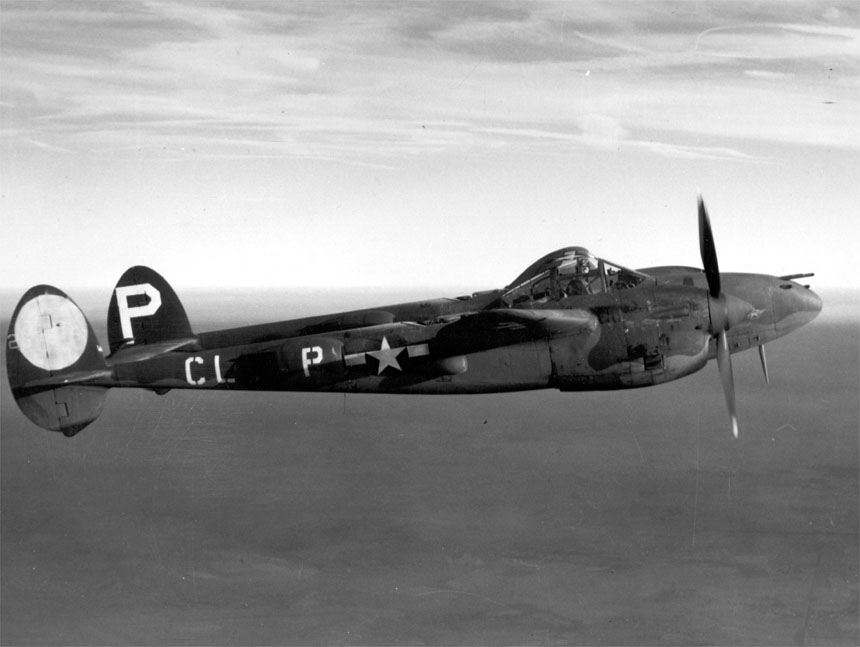
P-38 Lightning

On June 12, Westbrook shot down a Zero near the Russell Islands, northwest of Guadalcanal. This was his fifth aerial victory and this made him the first flying ace of the 44th FS. He scored his final aerial victories in the P-40, when he shot down a Nakajima A6M2-N "Hap" and a Zero, while protecting Allied ships that were supporting the landings on New Georgia and Rendova Islands. On September 25, 1943, Westbrook was promoted to major and became commander of the 44th Fighter Squadron. The 44th FS transitioned from the P-40 to Lockheed P-38 Lightning. Westbrook flew his first combat mission in the P-38 on October 10 and on the same day, while flying a bomber escort with the 339th Fighter Squadron, he shot down one enemy airplane and shared destruction of another, crediting him with 44th FS' first aerial victories while flying the P-38. In September 1943, Westbrook was promoted to major and became commander of the 44th Fighter Squadron.

During December 1943, he shot down six Japanese planes in a three-day span over Rabaul, for which he received the Distinguished Service Cross. On January 6, 1944, during a fighter sweep over Rabaul, Westbrook was credited with the confirmed destruction of one enemy aircraft, which was his fifteenth aerial victory, and another probable enemy aircraft destroyed. It was his last mission with the 44th FS, before he was sent back to the United States for shore leave.

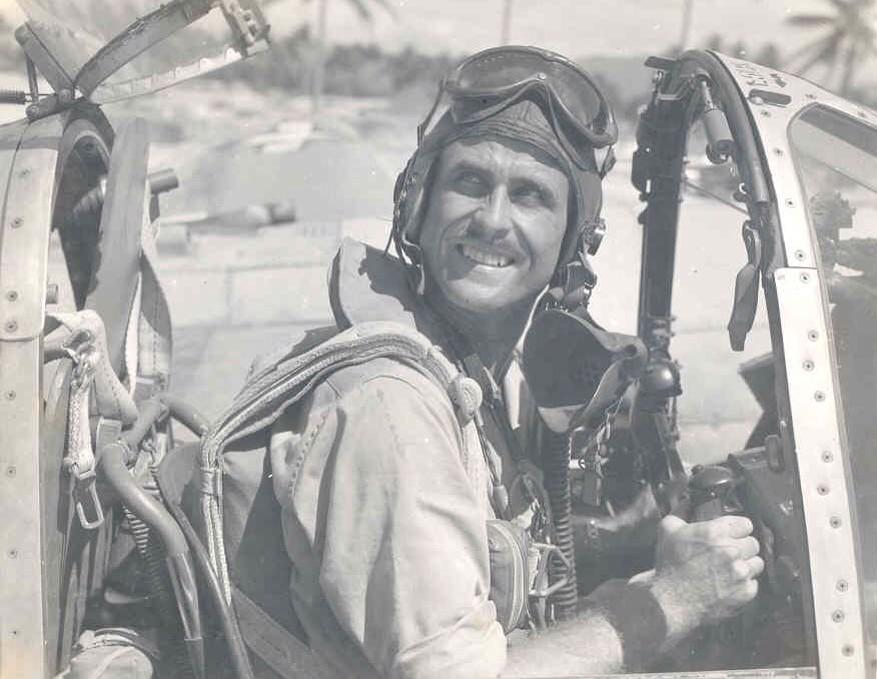
Westbrook in his P-38

Westbrook returned to Guadalcanal and in May 1944, he was appointed deputy commanding officer of the 347th Fighter Group and was promoted to lieutenant colonel. The 347th FG was then based on Stirling Island and on September 25, Westbrook shot down a Nakajima Ki-43 "Oscar" over Kendari. Five days later, he shot down another Ki-43 near an aerodrome in Boroboro, Southeast Sulawesi. On August, the 347th moved to Sansapor in Southwest Papua and then to nearby Middleburg Island in September. He was appointed as aide to the commander of the Thirteenth Air Force. On October 23, Westbrook shot down three Ki-43s over Boeloedowang Aerodrome near Makassar, his last aerial victories of the war. The 347th FG was awarded a Presidential Unit Citation for three missions in November.

During World War II, Westbrook flew a total of 367 combat missions. He was credited with the destruction of 20 enemy aircraft in aerial combat, which includes 13 in P-38 Lightning and 7 in P-40 Warhawk. With 20 victories, Westbrook became the Thirteenth Air Force's highest scoring ace.

==== Death ====
On November 22, 1944, Westbrook was leading the flight to destroy the Japanese naval convoys in Makassar bay. The flight proceeded to destroy or heavily damage 13 vessels by strafing. While strafing a Japanese gunboat, Westbrook's P-38 was hit by anti-aircraft fire from the convoy. He leveled his P-38 in an attempt to make a water landing, but the P-38 turned its nose down and slammed into the water, killing him instantly. His wingman was also shot down in the same mission, but was rescued by an U.S. Navy PBY Catalina. Westbrook's remains were never recovered.

== Awards and decorations ==
His decorations include:

USAAF Pilot Badge
Distinguished Service Cross	Silver Star w/ 1 bronze oak leaf cluster	Distinguished Flying Cross w/ 1 bronze oak leaf cluster
Purple Heart	Air Medal w/ 3 silver oak leaf clusters	American Defense Service Medal
American Campaign Medal	Asiatic-Pacific Campaign Medal w/ 3 bronze campaign stars	World War II Victory Medal

Army Presidential Unit Citation

=== Legacy ===
Westbrook is listed on the Walls of the Missing at Manila American Cemetery. There is a cenotaph placed for him at San Fernando Cemetery III in San Antonio, Texas.

A street in Kadena Air Base is named for Westbrook.

== Aerial victory credits ==
The data in the following table is from Newton and Senning (1978).

Date	Credits
27 January 1943	1
13 February 1943	1
7 June 1943	2
12 June 1943	1
1 July 1943	2
10 October 1943	1
23 December 1943	1
24 December 1943	3
25 December 1943	2
6 January 1944	1
25 September 1944	1
30 September 1944	1
23 October 1944	3
