= John L. Wirth =

American fighter ace

John Louis Wirth
- Born: April 25, 1917; North Vernon, Indiana, US
- Died: April 13, 1945 (aged 27) Alpine, California, US
- Buried: Saint Mary's Cemetery, North Vernon, Indiana
- Allegiance: United States
- Branch: United States Navy
- Service years: 1934–1945
- Rank: Lieutenant
- Conflicts: World War II
- Awards: Navy Cross; Silver Star (2); Distinguished Flying Cross; Air Medal (3)

John Louis Wirth (April 25, 1917 – April 13, 1945) was a highly decorated United States Navy officer. He was a flying ace credited with 14 aerial victories and was awarded the Navy Cross during World War II.

== Early life and service ==
John L. Wirth was born on April 25, 1917, in North Vernon, Indiana. Wirth enlisted in the Navy on September 18, 1934. His first assignment was aboard the USS Ranger, where Wirth served as a machinist's mate for five years.

Wirth was promoted to warrant machinist upon completed flight training on March 21, 1942, and was commissioned as an ensign on June 15. Upon earning his wings, Wirth was assigned to a series of patrol squadrons, flying Consolidated PB4Y-2 Privateers on anti-submarine patrols.

== Fighter pilot ==
On May 1, 1943, Wirth was promoted to lieutenant, junior grade and assigned to Fighter Squadron 31 (VF-31). VF-31 was assigned to the aircraft carrier USS Cabot in September, and began flying F6F Hellcats in combat operations in January 1944. On January 29, 1944, Wirth scored his first aerial victory over Kwajalein Atoll.

On the morning of March 30, Lieutenant Wirth was separated from his division during a combat mission over Palau and joined up with planes from another carrier. Lieutenant Wirth claimed to have shot down two Zeros and probably downed a third, despite nearly being shot down himself. However, he was not given credit for these kills since he was not with his squadron.

Later in the evening of that same day, Lieutenant Wirth rejoined his division during a second combat mission and shot down three Judy dive bombers. If Lieutenant Wirth was given credit for his two earlier kills, it would have made him one of the few American "aces in a day" during World War II. He also would have finished the war with 16 victories rather than 14. Lieutenant Wirth was officially credited with his fifth kill and given ace status two days later on April 1.

On June 19, 1944, Lieutenant Wirth's squadron took part in the battle of the Philippine Sea, also known as the Marianas Turkey Shoot. Wirth and five other pilots in his group downed 15 enemy aircraft, with Wirth personally downing four of them. Lieutenant Wirth was awarded the Navy Cross for his actions that day.

Lieutenant Wirth was credited with his tenth kill on July 8, becoming a double ace. On September 24, 1944, Wirth downed four more aircraft over the Philippines, his final victories of the war. He was awarded the Silver Star for his actions.

== Later career and death ==
VF-31 rotated out of combat in October, and Lieutenant Wirth reported to Naval Air Station North Island in San Diego, California, in December.

On April 13, 1945, Lieutenant Wirth was killed when his F6F Hellcat crashed outside the town of Alpine, California. He was buried in Saint Mary's Cemetery in his hometown of North Vernon.
