= Max Bucholz =

German World War II fighter pilot (1912-1996)

Max Buchholz
- Bucholz as an Oberleutnant
- Born: 3 November 1912; Zerbst, Duchy of Anhalt
- Died: 19 July 1996 (aged 83); Warnemünde
- Military career
- Allegiance: Nazi Germany
- Branch: Reichsmarine (1931–35); Kriegsmarine (1935–39); Luftwaffe (1939–45)
- Service years: 1931–1945
- Rank: Major
- Units: JG 3, JG 5, JG 106, JG 102
- Conflicts: World War II: Battle of France; Battle of Britain; Operation Barbarossa; Defense of the Reich; Operation Cerberus; Operation Donnerkeil
- Awards: Knight's Cross of the Iron Cross

Max Buchholz (Note: According to Scherzer his name is spelled Max Buchholz.) (3 November 1912 – 19 July 1996) was a German Luftwaffe ace and recipient of the Knight's Cross of the Iron Cross during World War II. Bucholz was credited with between 28 and 30 victories, including an ace in a day.

== Early life and career ==
Buchholz was born on 3 November 1912 in Zerbst, at the time in the Duchy of Anhalt within the German Empire. He joined the Reichsmarine on 1 April 1931. (Note: The German Reichsmarine was renamed to Kriegsmarine on 1 June 1935.) There, he received his military basic training in the 2. Kompanie (2nd company) in the II. Abteilung (2nd department) of the Schiffsstammdivision (standing ship division) of the Baltic Sea in Stralsund. On 16 May 1939, Bucholz was transferred to the Luftwaffe.

== World War II ==
World War II in Europe began on Friday 1 September 1939 when German forces invaded Poland. Buchholz had been posted to the 1. Staffel (1st squadron) of Jagdgeschwader 3 (JG 3—3rd Fighter Wing). At the start of the war, the Staffel was based at Brandis and commanded by Oberleutnant Werner Andres which was subordinated to I. Gruppe (1st group) headed by Major Otto-Heinrich von Houwald. Houwald was replaced by Hauptmann Günther Lützow on 3 November.

=== Battle of France ===
On 10 May 1940, the Wehrmacht began its offensive Operation Case Yellow (Fall Gelb), the invasion of France and the neutral Low Countries. I. Gruppe of JG 3 participated in the offensive as a subordinated unit of Jagdgeschwader 77 (JG 77—77th Fighter Wing). During the Battle of France, JG 77 was under control of I. Fliegerkorps (1st Air Corps), which formed the right wing of Luftflotte 3 (3rd Air Fleet) in Belgium and the Netherlands.

On 17 May, Buchholz claimed his first aerial victory and became an "ace-in-a-day". That day, the Royal Air Force (RAF) Bomber Command sent 12 Bristol Blenheim bombers from No. 82 Squadron against German ground forces advancing through the Gembloux Gap. With the exception of one Blenheim, all the bombers were shot down, including four by Buchholz. Later that afternoon, he shot down a Hawker Hurricane and a Curtiss P-36 Hawk near Saint-Quentin, taking his total to six aerial victories.

On 15 September, flying Messerschmitt Bf 109 E-1 (Werknummer 1563—factory number) during the Battle of Britain, he made a forced landing in the English Channel. His injuries required hospitalization in Boulogne.

=== War against the Soviet Union ===
In preparation for Operation Barbarossa, the German invasion of the Soviet Union, the I. Gruppe moved to an airfield at Dub on 18 June 1941. At the start of the campaign, JG 3 was subordinated to the V. Fliegerkorps (5th Air Corps), under command of General der Flieger Robert Ritter von Greim, which was part of Luftflotte 4 (4th Air Fleet), under command of Generaloberst Alexander Löhr. These air elements supported Generalfeldmarschall Gerd von Rundstedt's Heeresgruppe Süd (Army Group South), with the objective of capturing Ukraine and its capital Kiev.

In aerial combat, Bucholz's Bf 109 F-2 (Werknummer 5436) sustained combat damage in the undercarriage resulting in a crash landing at Polonnoje. On 15 July 1941, Buchholz was appointed Staffelkapitän of 2. Staffel of JG 3. He succeeded Oberleutnant Helmut Meckel who had fallen ill. The Staffel was part of I. Gruppe of JG 3 then under the command of Hauptmann Hans von Hahn.

=== Western Front ===
In September 1941, with the exception of 3. Staffel which followed in November, I. Gruppe of JG 3 was transferred from the Eastern Front to Germany for rest and re-supply. In November 1941, it was transferred to the northern Netherlands and on 15 January 1942 re-designated II. Gruppe of Jagdgeschwader 1 (JG 1—1st Fighter Wing) in Katwijk. In consequence, 1. Staffel of JG 3 became the 4. Staffel of JG 1, 2. Staffel of JG 3 became the 5. Staffel of JG 1, and 3. Staffel of JG 3 became the 6. Staffel of JG 1.

Buchholz claimed last aerial victory during Operation Donnerkeil. The objective of this operation was to give the German battleships Scharnhorst and Gneisenau and the heavy cruiser Prinz Eugen fighter protection in the breakout from Brest to Germany. The Channel Dash operation (11–13 February 1942) by the Kriegsmarine was codenamed Operation Cerberus by the Germans. In support of this, the Luftwaffe, formulated an air superiority plan dubbed Operation Donnerkeil for the protection of the three German capital ships. Flying from Haamstede on 12 February, Buchholz was credited with shooting down a Blenheim bomber. In May 1942, II. Gruppe was reequipped with the Focke-Wulf Fw 190 A series, a radial engine powered fighter aircraft, at Woensdrecht Air Field.

In late 1942, Bucholz was transferred to the Jagdfliegerschule 6 (JFS 6—6th Fighter Pilot School), a fighter pilot school at Lachen-Speyersdorf near Neustadt an der Weinstraße, as an instructor. JFS 6 later formed I. Gruppe of Jagdgeschwader 106 (JG 106—106th Fighter Wing) at Bad Schussenried under the command of Bucholz.

== Later life ==
Bucholz died on 19 July 1996 at the age of 83 in Warnemünde, Germany.

== Summary of career ==
=== Aerial victory claims ===
According to Obermaier, Buchholz was credited with 28 aerial victories claimed in approximately 170 combat missions. This figure includes 18 claims on the Eastern Front and ten over the Western Allies. Mathews and Foreman, authors of Luftwaffe Aces — Biographies and Victory Claims, researched the German Federal Archives and also found records for 28 aerial victory claims, including 18 aerial victories on the Eastern Front and ten on the Western Front.

Chronicle of aerial victories
This and the ♠ (Ace of spades) indicates those aerial victories which made Buchholz an "ace-in-a-day", a term which designates a fighter pilot who has shot down five or more airplanes in a single day. This and the ? (question mark) indicates information discrepancies listed by Prien, Stemmer, Rodeike, Bock, Mathews and Foreman.
Claim	Date	Time	Type	Location	Claim	Date	Time	Type	Location
– 1. Staffel of Jagdgeschwader 3 – Battle of France — 10 May – 25 June 1940
1♠	17 May 1940	08:20~	Blenheim	west of Saint-Quentin	4♠	17 May 1940	08:20~	Blenheim	west of Saint-Quentin
2♠	17 May 1940	08:20~	Blenheim	west of Saint-Quentin	5♠	17 May 1940	12:30	Curtiss? (Note: According to Mathews and Foreman claimed as a Hawker Hurricane fighter.)	south of Saint-Quentin
3♠	17 May 1940	08:20~	Blenheim	west of Saint-Quentin	6♠	17 May 1940	19:15	Curtiss	north of Cambrai
– 1. Staffel of Jagdgeschwader 3 – Battle of Britain and on the English Channel — 26 June 1940 – 9 June 1941
7	2 September 1940	—	Hurricane	Maidstone	9	7 September 1940	—	M.S.406	Rochester
8	7 September 1940	—	M.S.406	Rochester					
– Stab I. Gruppe of Jagdgeschwader 3 – Operation Barbarossa — 22 June – 16 September 1941
10	26 June 1941	09:45	SB-2	northwest of Brody	19	10 July 1941	15:15	SB-2? (Note: According to Mathews and Foreman claimed as a Mikoyan-Gurevich MiG-1 fighter.)	4 km (2.5 mi) south of Barbolok
11	29 June 1941	12:20	I-153	north-northwest of Kremenets	20	11 July 1941	13:20	DB-3? (Note: According to Mathews and Foreman claimed as a Ilyushin Il-4 bomber.)	15 km (9.3 mi) southwest of Berdychiv
12	29 June 1941	12:22	I-153	west of Kremenets	21	12 July 1941	14:50	I-17 (MiG-1)	15 km (9.3 mi) east of Zhytomyr
13	29 June 1941	12:26	I-153	southwest of Kremenets	22	12 July 1941	14:55	I-17 (MiG-1)	15 km (9.3 mi) east of Zhytomyr
14	29 June 1941	18:05	I-153	10 km (6.2 mi) north of Zaslawye	23♠	13 July 1941	16:15	I-153	20 km (12 mi) east of Berdychiv
15	2 July 1941	10:00	DI-6	30 km (19 mi) southeast of Astravyets	24♠	13 July 1941	16:17	I-153	east of Berdychiv
16	5 July 1941	11:50	Pe-2	northwest of Gudnow	25♠	13 July 1941	16:20	I-16	south of Oschadowska
17	6 July 1941	15:40	DB-3?	south of Polonne	26♠	13 July 1941	16:23	SB-2	north of Pykiv
18	10 July 1941	15:10	I-17 (MiG-1)	10 km (6.2 mi) south of Kurin	27♠	13 July 1941	16:25	SB-2	Pykiv
– 5. Staffel of Jagdgeschwader 1 – On the Western Front — 1 January – 31 December 1942
28	12 February 1942	16:45	Blenheim	90 km (56 mi) west of Texel					

=== Awards ===
- Flugzeugführerabzeichen
- Front Flying Clasp of the Luftwaffe in Gold
- Iron Cross (1939)
  - 2nd Class (26 May 1940)
  - 1st Class (30 May 1940)
- Honor Goblet of the Luftwaffe (11 October 1940)
- Wound Badge in Black (26 November 1940)
- Knight's Cross of the Iron Cross on 12 August 1941 as Oberleutnant and Staffelkapitän in the I./Jagdgeschwader 3 (Note: According to Scherzer as pilot in the Stab I./Jagdgeschwader 3.)
