= Helmut Meckel =

German World War II flying ace (1917–1943)

- Meckel as an Oberleutnant
- Born: 23 August 1917; Munich
- Died: 8 May 1943 (aged 25); Tunis, Tunisia
- Burial place: German Military Cemetery at Bordj-Cedria
- Military career
- Allegiance: Nazi Germany
- Branch: Heer (1935–39); Luftwaffe (1939–43)
- Service years: 1935–1943
- Rank: Oberleutnant (first lieutenant)
- Units: JG 3, JG 77
- Commands: 2./JG 3
- Conflicts: World War II: Battle of France; Battle of Britain; The Hardest Day; Operation Barbarossa; Battle of Kiev (1941); Tunisia Campaign
- Awards: Knight's Cross of the Iron Cross

Helmut Meckel (23 August 1917 – 8 May 1943) was a German Luftwaffe ace and recipient of the Knight's Cross of the Iron Cross during World War II. The Knight's Cross of the Iron Cross, and its variants were the highest awards in the military and paramilitary forces of Nazi Germany during World War II. Meckel was killed on 8 May 1943 in a flying accident during the evacuation of Tunis. During his career he was credited with 25 aerial victories with 14 over the Eastern Front and 11 over the Western Front.

== Early life and career ==
Meckel was born on 23 August 1917 in Munich, then the capital of the Kingdom of Bavaria. In October 1935, Meckel joined the military service of the Wehrmacht, initially serving in an artillery regiment. In March 1939, Meckel transferred to the newly emerging Luftwaffe. Following flight and fighter pilot training, (Note: Flight training in the Luftwaffe progressed through the levels A1, A2 and B1, B2, referred to as A/B flight training. A training included theoretical and practical training in aerobatics, navigation, long-distance flights and dead-stick landings. The B courses included high-altitude flights, instrument flights, night landings and training to handle the aircraft in difficult situations.) he was posted to 2. Staffel (2nd squadron) of Jagdgeschwader 3 (JG 3—3rd Fighter Wing) holding the rank of Leutnant (second lieutenant).

== World War II ==
World War II in Europe had begun on Friday 1 September 1939 when German forces invaded Poland. Meckel claimed his first aerial on 7 June 1940 during the Battle of France. Fighting in the combat area of the lower Somme, Meckel claimed a Hawker Hurricane fighter shot down near Abbeville. At the time, Meckel was a pilot in 2. Staffel of JG 3 commanded by Oberleutnant Helmut Tiedmann. The Staffel was subordinated to I. Gruppe (1st group) of JG 3 headed by Hauptmann Günther Lützow.

On 21 August, command hierarchy within JG 3 changed when Lützow was appointed Geschwaderkommodore (wing commander) of JG 3. In consequence, Oberleutnant Lothar Keller was briefly given command of I. Gruppe until Hauptmann Hans von Hahn officially took command on 27 August. On 24 August, Meckel's Messerschmitt Bf 109 E-4 (Werknummer 1649—factory number) was hit by friendly fire from a Seenotdienst (sea rescue service) Dornier Do 18. Hit in the radiator, he made an emergency landing at Calais. By then, Meckel had been awarded both classes of the Iron Cross (Eisernes Kreuz). On 15 September, Meckel was appointed Staffelkapitän (squadron leader) of 2. Staffel of JG 3. He succeeded Oberleutnant Helmut Reumschüssel who had become a prisoner of war. At the end of 1941, with nine aerial victories claimed against the Royal Air Force (RAF) since June, Meckel was the most successful fighter pilot of I. Gruppe at the time.

On 5 February 1941, the RAF flew "Circus" No. 3 targeting the airfield at Saint-Omer. That day, Meckel claimed two Supermarine Spitfire fighters shot down near Saint-Omer. On 14 February, I. Gruppe began relocating back to Germany for a period of rest and replenishment, completing the transfer to Mannheim-Sandhofen Airfield by 18 February. The pilots were then sent on a skiing vacation to Seefeld in Tirol and returned to active duty by 31 March. The Gruppe was then equipped with the Bf 109 F variant. On 18 April, I. Gruppe began relocating back to English Channel, then based at Saint-Pol-sur-Ternoise, completing the transfer by 6 May. In late May, the Gruppe was again withdrawn from the English Channel.

=== War against the Soviet Union ===
In preparation for Operation Barbarossa, the German invasion of the Soviet Union, the I. Gruppe moved to an airfield at Dub on 18 June 1941. At the start of the campaign, JG 3 was subordinated to the V. Fliegerkorps (5th Air Corps), under command of General der Flieger Robert Ritter von Greim, which was part of Luftflotte 4 (4th Air Fleet), under command of Generaloberst Alexander Löhr. These air elements supported Generalfeldmarschall Gerd von Rundstedt's Heeresgruppe Süd (Army Group South), with the objective of capturing Ukraine and its capital Kiev. On 23 June, the second day of the invasion, I. Gruppe pilots claimed 19 aerial victories, including two by Meckel, taking his total to 14 aerial victories claimed.

On 15 July 1941, Meckel was withdrawn from combat operations due to illness. He was sent back to Germany for hospitalization and convalescence. In consequence, command of 2. Staffel was passed on to Oberleutnant Max Bucholz. On 12 August, Meckel was awarded the Knight's Cross of the Iron Cross (Ritterkreuz des Eisernen Kreuzes) for 25 aerial victories claimed. He was the fifth pilot of JG 3 to receive this distinction. Following his recovery, he served as an instructor at the Luftkriegsakademie (air war academy) at Berlin-Gatow.

=== With Jagdgeschwader 77 and death ===
In October 1942, Jagdgeschwader 77 (JG 77—77th Fighter Wing) was placed under the command of Major Joachim Müncheberg. JG 77 had just been withdrawn from the Eastern Front and was reequipped with the Bf 109 G-2 trop in Munich for deployment to North Africa. Here, Meckel joined JG 77's Geschwaderstab (headquarters unit), serving as Münchberg's Ia (operations officer).

On 8 May 1943, the Geschwaderstab left Africa and relocated to Trapani, Sicily. Due to pilot error, Meckel crashed Messerschmitt Bf 108 B-2 (Werknummer 3073) during takeoff at Korbous, killing him and four other passengers. He is buried at the German Military Cemetery at Bordj-Cedria.

== Summary of career ==
=== Aerial victory claims ===
According to Obermaier, Meckel was credited with 25 aerial victories claimed in an unknown number combat missions. Mathews and Foreman, authors of Luftwaffe Aces — Biographies and Victory Claims, researched the German Federal Archives and found records for 26 aerial victory claims, including on the 12 claims on Western Front and 14 on the Eastern Front.

Chronicle of aerial victories
This and the ? (question mark) indicates information discrepancies listed by Prien, Stemmer, Rodeike, Bock, Forsyth, Mathews and Foreman.
Claim	Date	Time	Type	Location	Claim	Date	Time	Type	Location
– 2. Staffel of Jagdgeschwader 3 – Battle of France — 10 May – 25 June 1940
1	7 June 1940	—	Hurricane	Abbéville					
– 1. Staffel of Jagdgeschwader 3 – Battle of Britain — 26 June – 18 September 1940
2	16 August 1940	—	Spitfire		5	7 September 1940	—	Spitfire	
3	18 August 1940	—	Hurricane		6	7 September 1940	—	Spitfire	
? (Note: This claim is not listed by Prien, Stemmer, Rodeike and Bock.)	26 August 1940	—	Spitfire		7	18 September 1940	—	Hurricane	south of London
4	28 August 1940	—	Hurricane	southeast of Cambridge					
– 2. Staffel of Jagdgeschwader 3 – Battle of Britain — October 1940 – 9 June 1941
8	5 October 1940	—	Hurricane	Canterbury	10	5 February 1941	—	Spitfire	1 km (0.62 mi) southwest of Saint-Omer
9	7 October 1940	—	Spitfire	Thames Estuary	11	5 February 1941	—	Spitfire	northwest of Saint-Omer; 5 km (3.1 mi) southwest of Saint-Omer
– 2. Staffel of Jagdgeschwader 3 – Operation Barbarossa — 22 June – 15 July 1941
12	22 June 1941	08:30	I-16	Gródek	19	8 July 1941	17:25	DB-3	north of Kotelanka
13	23 June 1941	06:00	DB-3	south of Włodzimierz	20	8 July 1941	17:30	DB-3	south of Lipno
14	23 June 1941	06:05	DB-3	south of Włodzimierz	21	9 July 1941	05:45	DB-3	15 km (9.3 mi) southeast of Gudnow
15	25 June 1941	10:55	I-153	west of Pawlow	22	10 July 1941	10:30	Pe-2	north of Fasowka
16	2 July 1941	12:35	DB-3	30 km (19 mi) east of Korets	23	10 July 1941	15:35	I-153	south of Sitniaki
17	2 July 1941	12:40	DB-3	east of Korets	24	11 July 1941	09:50	V-11 (Il-2)	east of Kiev
18	5 July 1941	—	I-153		25	11 July 1941	16:30	V-11 (Il-2)	north of Kiev

=== Awards ===
- Iron Cross (1939) 2nd and 1st Class
- Honor Goblet of the Luftwaffe (December 1940)
- Knight's Cross of the Iron Cross on 12 August 1941 as Oberleutnant and Staffelkapitän in the I./Jagdgeschwader 3 (Note: According to Scherzer as Staffelkapitän of the 2./Jagdgeschwader 3.)
