= Michael Crossley =

Michael Nicholson Crossley
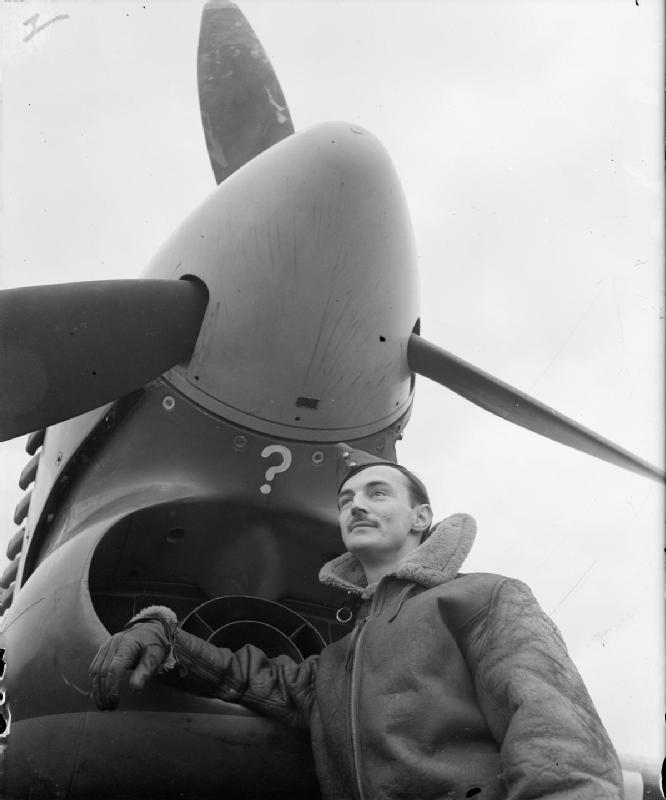
- Wing Commander Crossley standing in front of a Hawker Typhoon at Gravesend, Kent
- Born: 29 May 1912; Halford, Warwickshire, England
- Died: 7 December 1987 (aged 75); White River, South Africa
- Military career
- Allegiance: United Kingdom
- Branch: Royal Air Force
- Service years: 1936–1946
- Rank: Wing Commander
- Nickname: 'Red Knight'
- Commands: No. 32 Squadron; Detling Wing
- Conflicts: Second World War: Battle of France; Battle of Britain
- Awards: Distinguished Service Order; Officer of the Order of the British Empire; Distinguished Flying Cross; Mentioned in Despatches
- Other work: Agroforestry

Michael Nicholson Crossley, DSO, OBE, DFC (29 May 1912 – 7 December 1987) was a British flying ace of the Royal Air Force (RAF) during the Second World War. He is credited with having destroyed at least 22 aircraft and for a time was the RAF's most successful fighter pilot of the Second World War.

From Halford, Crossley joined the RAF in 1935. Once his flying training was completed, he was posted to No. 32 Squadron, based at Biggin Hill. By the time of the outbreak of the Second World War, Crossley was a flight lieutenant and led one of the squadron's flights. Flying the Hawker Hurricane fighter He achieved his first aerial victories during the Battle of France, for which he was subsequently awarded the Distinguished Flying Cross. He flew extensively with the squadron for the first two months of the Battle of Britain, becoming its commander in mid-August 1940. His successes during the campaign over southeast England saw him awarded the Distinguished Service Order. He relinquished command of the squadron in April 1941 and was sent to the United States on test pilot duties. Due to a health condition, he was unable to fly on operations for the later years of the war by which time he held the rank of wing commander. Returning to civilian life in 1946, he took up agroforestry in South Africa. He died there, aged 75.

== Early life ==
Born in Halford, Warwickshire on 29 May 1912, Michael Nicholson Crossley was educated at Eton College and the College of Aeronautical Engineering in Chelsea. During his tertiary studies he was a member of the Brooklands Flying Club and once he completed his studies in 1933, he was employed by the club. He joined the Royal Air Force (RAF) in 1935 on a short service commission, commencing his training in November. He proceeded onto No. 11 Flying Training School early the following year.

Crossley was confirmed as a pilot officer on 25 November 1936, by which time he had been posted to No. 32 Squadron. This was equipped with Gloster Gauntlet fighters and based at Biggin Hill. He was promoted flying officer on 25 May 1938. For a period of time he served in the Aden Colony as aide-de-camp to the governor there but had returned to the squadron at some stage in 1939. He became a flight commander just before the outbreak of war, being promoted to acting flight lieutenant on 7 August 1939. He was nicknamed the "Red Knight" by virtue of leading No. 32 Squadron's "Red Flight". By this time, the squadron was equipped with the Hawker Hurricane fighter, having converted to the type the previous year.

== Second World War ==
Following the outbreak of the Second World War, No. 32 Squadron was scrambled several times to deal with incoming German aircraft, but were mostly unsuccessful. Following the invasion of France and Low Countries on 10 May 1940, it began patrolling the Dutch coastline. Crossley carried out a successful offensive sortie the next day, strafing German troop carrying transport aircraft at Ypenburg Airfield.

=== Battle of France ===
On 18 May, the squadron was sent to France as reinforcements for the RAF fighter squadrons heavily engaged in the fighting there. An advance element was based at Abbeville and was immediately thrown into action. Crossley claimed his first aerial victory on 19 May, destroying a Messerschmitt Bf 109 fighter. He shot down another Bf 109 over Saint-Pol on 22 May and this was followed the next day with his destruction of two Bf 109s to the east of Ypres. During the evacuation of the British Expeditionary Force (BEF) from Dunkirk, the squadron, now back at Biggin Hill, assisted in providing aerial cover over the beaches. Crossley shot down a Junkers Ju 88 medium bomber near Dunkirk on 26 May. His flight lieutenant rank was made permanent at the end of the month. When the evacuation of the BEF was completed, No. 32 Squadron continued to carry out patrols to France and on 8 June, Crossley shot down two Heinkel He 111 medium bombers near Le Tréport.

As a result of his successes Crossley was awarded the Distinguished Flying Cross (DFC) on 21 June, which was presented to him by King George VI in a investiture held at Biggin Hill. The citation for his DFC, published in the London Gazette, read:

In June, 1940, this officer was the leader of two squadrons of fighters which were carrying out an offensive patrol in the Le Treport area. Flight Lieutenant Crossley sighted seventeen Heinkel 111's, and displayed outstanding initiative and courage in his method of attack. As a result of the engagement seven enemy bombers were destroyed. Flight Lieutenant Crossley himself destroyed two, and had to break off a further fight as his ammunition was expended. He had his first combat in May, 1940, when he succeeded in destroying a Messerschmitt 109. He has displayed exceptional skill and leadership and, since the middle of May, 1940, has destroyed seven enemy aircraft.

— London Gazette, No. 34878, 21 June 1940

=== Battle of Britain ===
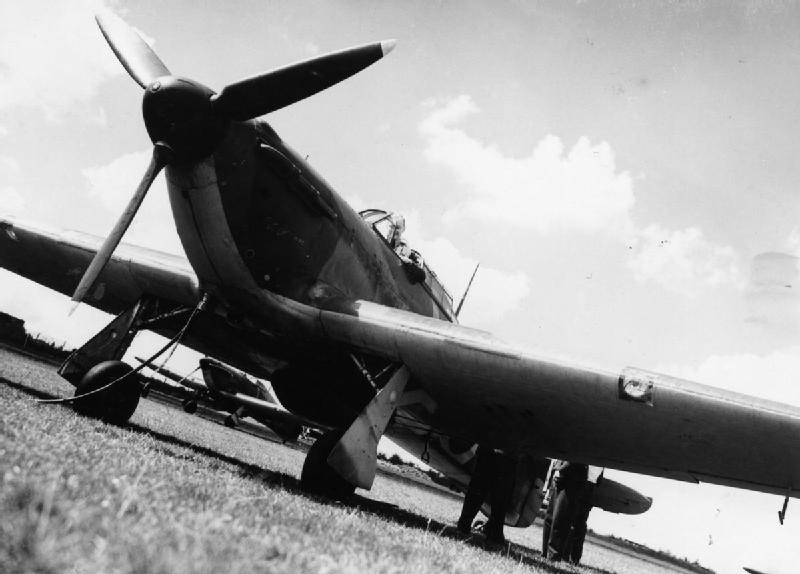
A Hawker Hurricane of No. 32 Squadron, July 1940

By the end of June, No. 32 Squadron was tasked with defending the English airfields and over the following weeks became heavily engaged in countering the bombing raids of the Luftwaffe. Crossley shared in the destruction of a Messerschmitt Bf 110 heavy fighter on 20 July 12 miles (19 km) to the southeast of Dover, also shooting down a Bf 109 just off the coast from Dover the same day. On 25 July he claimed to have destroyed a Bf 109 off Dover but this was not confirmed. He shot down one Bf 109 near Deal and another several miles from Dover on 12 August. Three days later, with the Luftwaffe escalating its operations, and Crossley destroyed two Ju 88s near Portsmouth and then in a subsequent sortie to intercept a raid on Croydon, shot down two Dornier Do 17 medium bombers, one shared with another pilot. The next day, Crossley was promoted to squadron leader and succeeded John Worrall as commander of No. 32 Squadron. The day of his promotion, Crossley destroyed three aircraft: a Bf 109 near Folkestone, a Ju 88 over Sevenoaks, and a Bf 110, also over Sevenoaks.

On 18 August, known as The Hardest Day, Crossley and his squadron were heavily engaged in the morning and afternoon battles. Scrambled to intercept a group of bombers heading for Kenley, leading it in a head-on attack against the approaching Luftwaffe formation. Crossley damaged one Do 17 and his charge caused the formation to lose cohesion and scatter. He destroyed a Ju 88 in a subsequent sortie and on his final engagement of 18 August, in which he shot down a Bf 109, he too was shot down and bailed out of his Hurricane. He landed in Gillingham and was taken by Home Guard personnel to a nearby pub for a drink. Just a few days later, on 24 August, his Hurricane was damaged during an engagement over Folkestone and Crossley had to make a crash landing at Lyminge. Uninjured, he was back on operations the next day and destroyed a Do 17 and Bf 109, both off Cap Gris-Nez.

No. 32 Squadron was withdrawn to Acklington, in the north, for a rest period on 28 August. Crossley was the RAF's most successful fighter pilot by this stage of the war, having 22 confirmed victories. He was awarded the Distinguished Service Order on 30 August; the published citation reads:

This officer has led his section, flight and squadron with skill and courage and has flown almost continuously since the commencement of hostilities. Since May, he has participated in engagements against the enemy over Holland, Belgium and France, including patrols over Dunkirk and St. Valery during the evacuation operations. In August he destroyed two Junkers 88 over Portsmouth and assisted in the destruction of another over Croydon. During the latter engagement he encountered another Junkers 88 and, having expended all his ammunition, acted as above guard until two of his section finally destroyed it. The next day he destroyed three enemy aircraft. Squadron Leader Crossley has now destroyed a total of eighteen enemy aircraft and possibly another five. He has displayed rare qualities as a leader; his example of courage and tenacity of purpose have proved an inspiration to other members of his squadron.

— London Gazette, No. 34935, 30 August 1940

=== Later war service ===
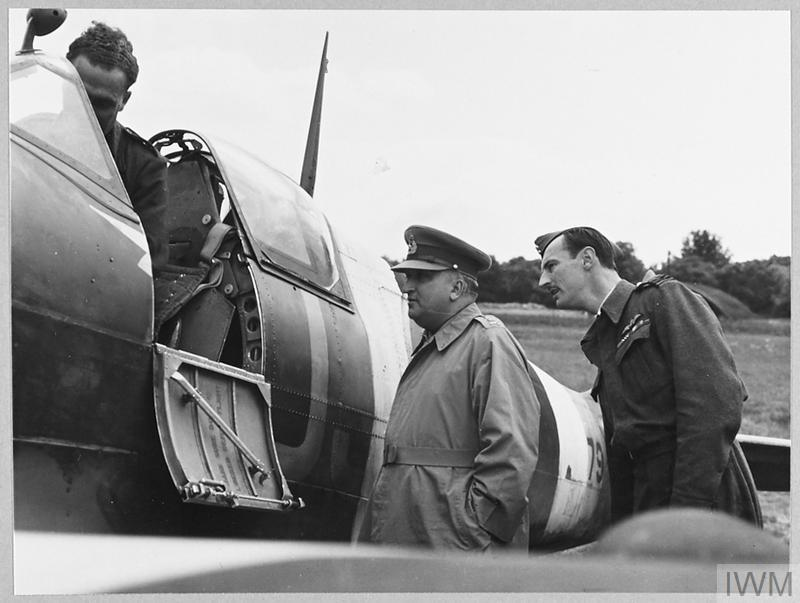
Crossley, on the right, accompanying the Maharajah of Kashmir on an inspection of a Spitfire, 1944

While at Acklington, No. 32 Squadron started training in night fighting duties and at the start of 1941 it moved to Middle Wallop, from where it carried out convoy patrols over the west coast of England. Crossley in the meantime had been mentioned in despatches on 1 January. He remained with No. 32 Squadron until April, when he was sent as test pilot for the British Air Commission in the United States. Promoted to wing commander on 1 September 1942, he returned to the UK the following year, where he was made wing leader at RAF Detling. Soon after, Crossley's operational flying career ended when he contracted tuberculosis and he was restricted in his duties for the remainder of the war.

Crossley ended the war credited with 22 aerial victories, two of which were shared with other pilots, with another aircraft damaged. One further aerial victory is unconfirmed.

== Later life ==
Appointed an Officer of the Order of the British Empire on 1 January 1946, Crossley was discharged from the RAF later that year and placed on the RAF Reserve of Officers. Emigrating to South Africa, Crossley took up agroforestry with the timber from the trees grown on his property used in the mining industry. He retired from the RAF Reserve in 1957. He died at his home at White River in the Eastern Transvaal on 7 December 1987.
