= Avis Hearn =

British aircraftwoman (1916–2008)

Avis Joan Hearn MM
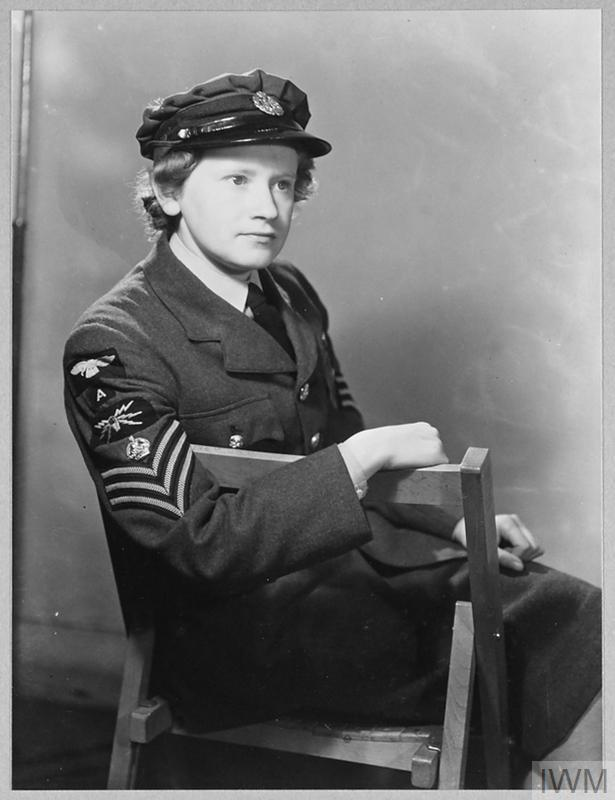
- Hearn in 1943
- Born: 30 June 1916; Chesham, Buckinghamshire, England
- Died: 27 March 2008 (aged 91); Rustington, Sussex, England
- Military career
- Branch: Women's Auxiliary Air Force
- Service years: 1939–1945
- Rank: Flight sergeant
- Service number: 880847
- Conflicts: Battle of Britain
- Awards: Military Medal

Avis Joan Hearn (30 June 1916 – 27 March 2008) was a British servicewoman who served in the Women's Auxiliary Air Force (WAAF) and was one of only six women in the service to be awarded the Military Medal during the Second World War.

Hearn was born in Chesham, Buckinghamshire, and, by 1939, was living in Amersham and working as an upholsterer. The preceding year, Hearn had enlisted in the 39th (Buckinghamshire) Company of the Auxiliary Territorial Service (ATS). The 39th company was one of a number of ATS units raised in 1938 to provide support to units of the Royal Air Force (RAF). In June 1939, the ATS RAF companies were transferred to the newly formed WAAF.

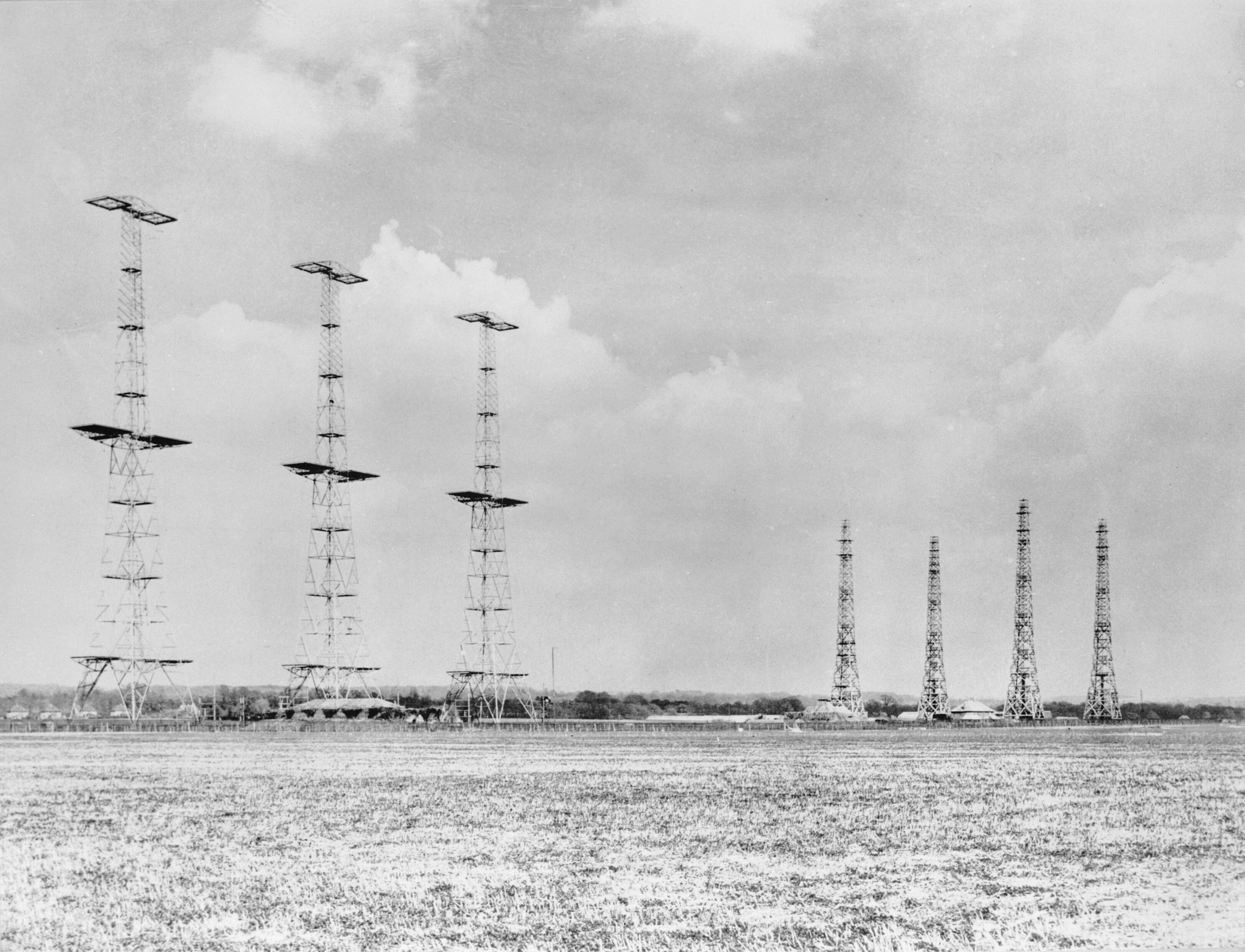
Poling radar station

At the outbreak of war, Hearn had already been mobilised and was on a course training to be a plotter and was, subsequently, trained to be a radar operator. On completion of her radar training, Hearn was posted to the radar station at Poling, West Sussex.

On 18 August 1940, which became known as The Hardest Day, Leading Aircraftwoman and acting Corporal Hearn was on duty in the afternoon and was operating the telephone system passing radar plot information from the operators to Fighter Command HQ at RAF Bentley Priory, Stanmore.

At around 2 pm, the air raid sirens sounded and the staff were told to take cover. Hearn refused and carried on passing information from the plotters onto the control room. For the next 20 minutes, Poling was bombed accurately by Junkers Ju 87 Stuka dive-bombers of Sturzkampfgeschwader 77. At one point, she was asked if she knew where the bombers were, to which she replied "The course of the enemy bombers is only too apparent to me because the bombs are almost dropping on my head." Hearn remained at her post even though the telephone lines were cut.

Significant damage was done to the building Hearn was working in. After the raid, the damage was so extensive that the station was out of action for some weeks but no casualties were suffered among the station personnel. A temporary station was established nearby at Amering Woods at which Hearn served until Poling was back in service in October 1940.

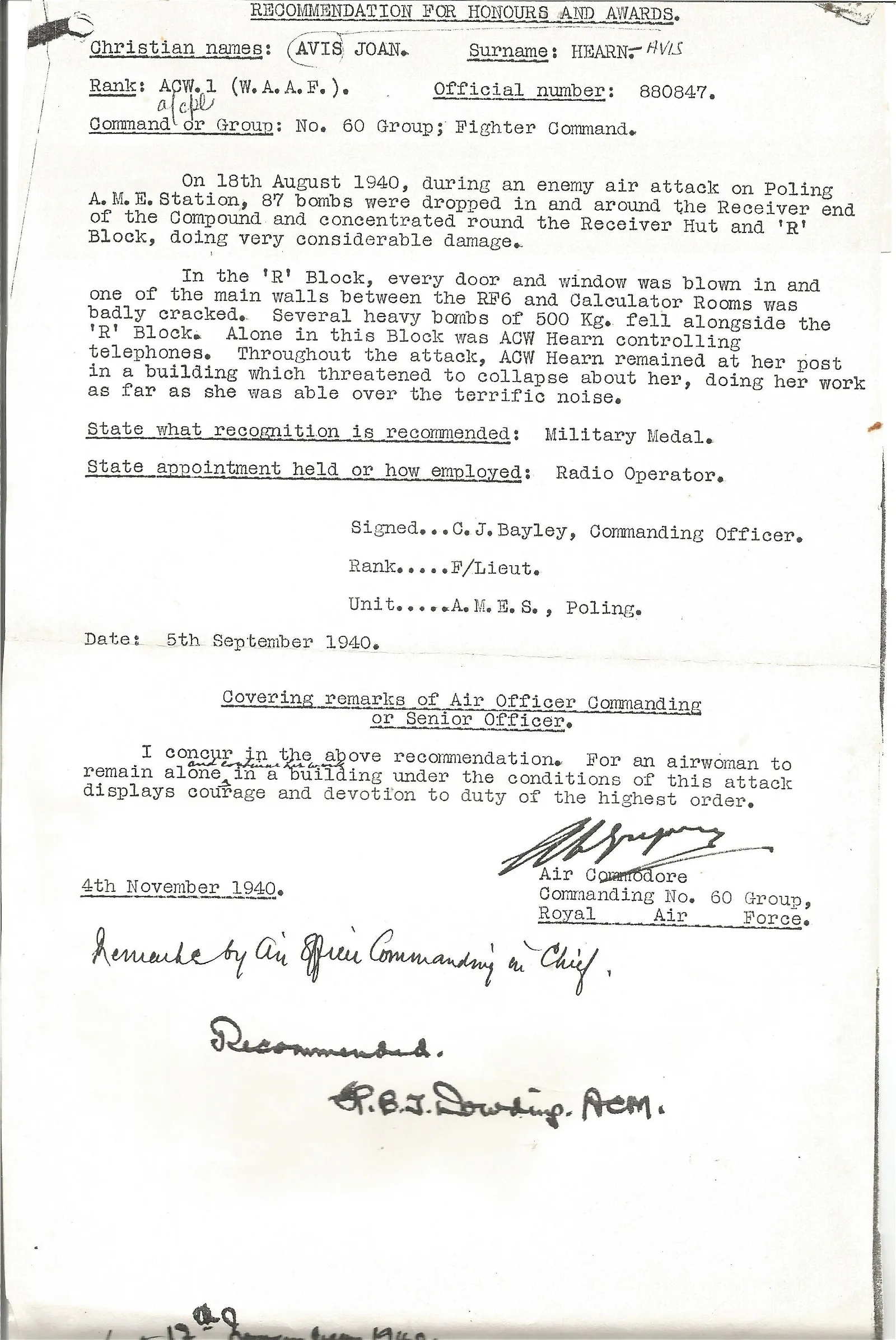
RAF memorandum and endorsements recommending Hearn for the award of the Military Medal

In September 1940, the officer commanding Poling, Flight lieutenant Bayley recommended Hearn for the immediate award of the Military Medal. The recommendation was endorsed by Air commodore Gregory (AOC 60 Group) and further endorsed by Air chief marshal Dowding (AOC-in-chief Fighter Command) in November 1940.

The award of the Military Medal was published in the London Gazette on 10 January 1940. Due to the secret nature of radar, the citation was less specific about Hearn's duties than the internal RAF memorandum. The citation read:

880847 Acting Corporal Joan HEARN-AVIS.

—Women's Auxiliary Air Force.

In August 1940, during an enemy air attack, bombs were dropped on buildings of the unit doing very considerable damage. Several heavy bombs fell alongside a block where Corporal Hearn-Avis was working alone controlling telephones. Every window was blown in and one of the main walls of two rooms was badly cracked. Throughout the attack, Corporal Hearn-Avis remained at her post in a building which threatened to collapse about her, doing her work as far as the terrific noise would permit. This airwoman displayed courage and devotion to duty of the highest order.

— "Awarded the Military Medal". The London Gazette. No. 35039. 10 January 1941. p. 196.

The incorrect description of her name was amended in the London Gazette on 7 March 1941.

Hearn was invested with her medal by King George VI at Buckingham Palace in March 1941.

Following service at another radar station, Hearn spent the rest of the war as a radar instructor at No. 8 Radio School at RAF Cranwell with the rank of Flight sergeant.

After her wartime service, Hearn returned to her pre-war trade as an upholsterer, eventually running her own business.

Avis Hearn died at the RAF Benevolent Fund's Princess Marina retirement home in Rustington on 27 March 2008.

== Sources ==
- Beauman, Katharine Bentley (1971). Partners in Blue: The Story of Women's Service with the Royal Air Force. Hutchinson. ISBN 0-09-105860-0.
- Grehan, John; Mace, Martin (January 2012). Battleground Sussex. Casemate Publishers. ISBN 978-1848846616.
- The Women's Auxiliary Air Force. Air Ministry. 1953.
