= Stanley Connors =

British WWII flying ace (1912–1940)

- Born: 8 April 1912; Calcutta, British India (now India)
- Died: 18 August 1940 (aged 28); Wallington, Surrey, United Kingdom
- Burial place: North Berwick Cemetery, United Kingdom
- Military career
- Allegiance: United Kingdom
- Branch: Royal Air Force
- Service years: 1937–1940
- Rank: Flight Lieutenant
- Unit: No. 111 Squadron
- Conflicts: Second World War: Battle of France; Battle of Britain
- Awards: Distinguished Flying Cross & Bar

Stanley Connors, DFC & Bar (8 April 1912 – 18 August 1940) was a British flying ace who served with the Royal Air Force (RAF) during the Second World War. He was credited with having shot down at least twelve aircraft.

Born in Calcutta in British India, Connors joined the RAF in 1937 having previously served with the Royal Auxiliary Air Force, and its precursor, the Special Reserve of the RAF. He was posted to No. 111 Squadron in June 1938, and flew Hawker Hurricane fighters. During the Battle of France, he shot down six German aircraft in the space of two days, for which he was awarded the Distinguished Flying Cross. He destroyed several more aircraft during the subsequent Battle of Britain, but was shot down and killed immediately after claiming his final aerial victory on what is now known as The Hardest Day.

== Early life ==
Stanley Dudley Pierce Connors was born at Calcutta, in British India, on 8 April 1912, the son of Pierce and Norah Connors. He was educated in Darjeeling, at St Paul's School, but subsequently went to England, where the Connors family had a home.

Connors, who was nicknamed 'Conny', joined the Special Reserve of the Royal Air Force (RAF) and was commissioned as a pilot officer on 26 March 1936. He resigned shortly afterwards when the Royal Auxiliary Air Force (RAuxAF) was formed out of the Special Reserve. He then joined the RAuxAF on 25 May, again as a pilot officer, with No. 500 Squadron. This was a light bomber unit based at Manston. In December 1937, he was granted a short service commission as an acting pilot officer in the RAF. After proceeding to No. 5 Flying Training School at Sealand and gaining his wings, he was posted to No. 111 Squadron in June 1938. At the time, the squadron was based at Northolt and equipped with the Hawker Hurricane fighter. Connors was confirmed in his pilot officer rank later in the year.

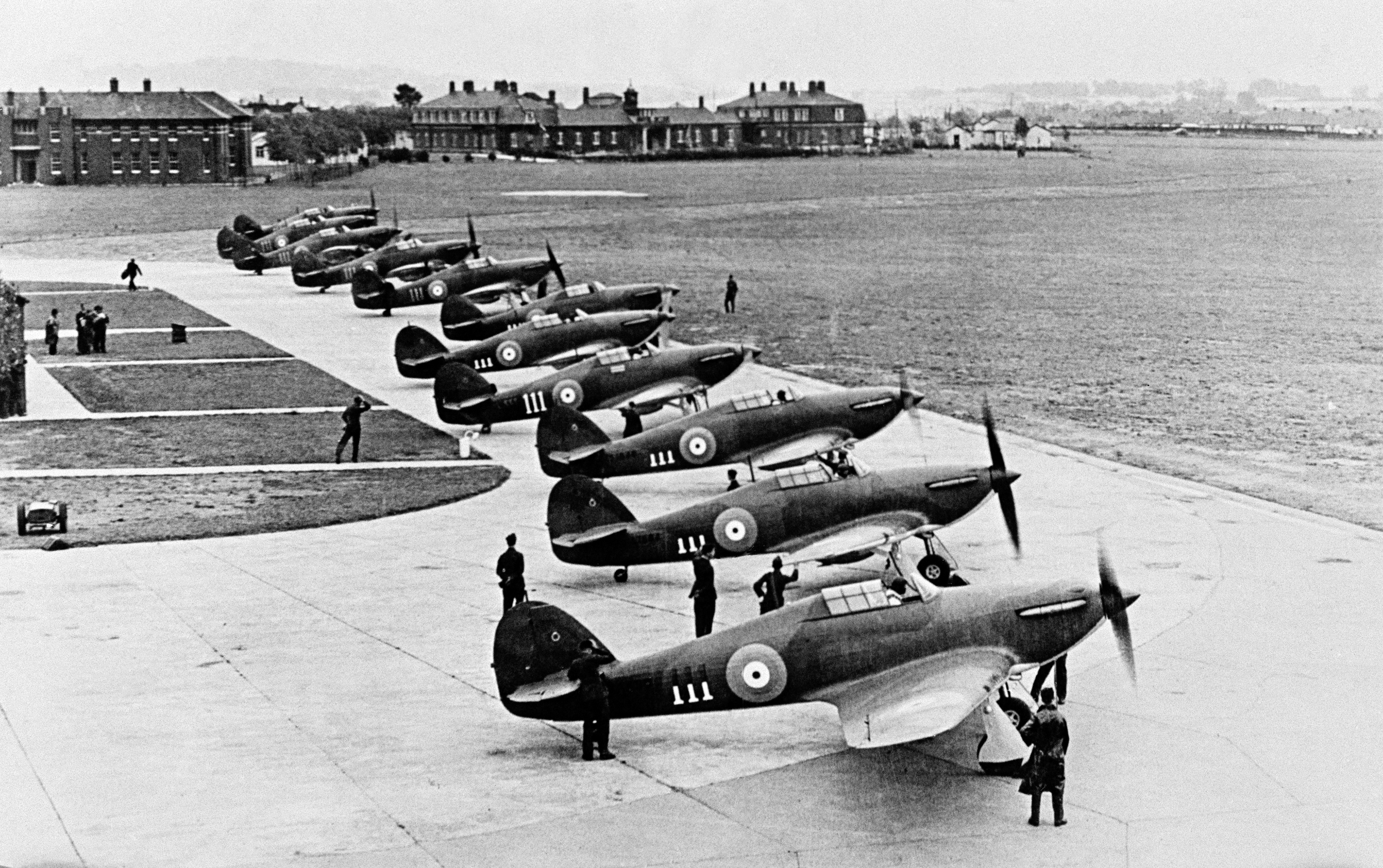
A line up of Hawker Hurricanes fighters of No. 111 Squadron, Northolt

== Second World War ==
Shortly after the outbreak of the Second World War, No. 111 Squadron moved north, initially to Acklington and then to Drem in Scotland, from where it patrolled along the coastline. In February 1940, the squadron shifted again, this time to Wick, where it provided the Royal Navy base at Scapa Flow with aerial cover. By May 1940, the squadron was back in the south of England, from where it regularly flew to France following the invasion of that country. Connors, who had been promoted to flying officer in August the previous year, claimed his first aerial victories on 18 May, destroying a Messerschmitt Bf 109 fighter and then a Junkers Ju 88 medium bomber. The following day he shot down three Heinkel He 111 medium bombers and another Ju 88. In recognition of his successes, Connors was awarded the Distinguished Flying Cross. The published citation read:

This officer showed outstanding fighting ability and gallantry when, during two consecutive days in May, 1940, whilst greatly outnumbered, he shot down three Heinkel 111s, two Junkers 88s and one Messerschmitt 109.

— London Gazette, No. 34860, 31 May 1940

At the end of the month and into early June, No. 111 Squadron flew in support of Operation Dynamo, the evacuation of the British Expeditionary Force from Dunkirk. Connors, by this time a flight lieutenant and leader of one of the squadron's flights, destroyed a Bf 109 over Dunkirk on 31 May although this was not confirmed. Similarly, a He 111 that he claimed to have shot down, also over Dunkirk, on 2 June was unable to be confirmed. Once the evacuation was completed, the squadron subsequently provided escorts for the Fleet Air Arm's bombing operations over the French coast and during one of these, on 7 June, Connors destroyed a Bf 109 to the west of Abbeville.

=== Battle of Britain ===
Following a period of rest so it could train up replacement pilots, No. 111 Squadron, now based at Croydon, commenced patrolling over the English Channel and then became drawn into the aerial fighting over the southeast of England during the Battle of Britain. Connors shot down a Bf 109 near Folkestone on 19 July, and damaged another on 25 July, in the vicinity of Dover. He shared in the destruction of a Ju 88 over the English Channel on 31 July, but this was unconfirmed. Flying near Margate on 11 August, he shot down a Bf 109. Four days later, across multiple sorties, he shot down a Ju 88 and damaged another near Selsey Bill, and destroyed a Messerschmitt Bf 110 heavy fighter and damaged a second, near Redhill and Croydon respectively. He damaged a Dornier Do 17 medium bomber near Maidstone on 16 August.

On 18 August, on what became known as the Hardest Day, No. 111 Squadron was scrambled to protect the airfield at Kenley, the target of a large Luftwaffe bombing raid. While attacking a Do 17, his aircraft was struck by anti-aircraft fire from Kenley's air defences. Despite his Hurricane being in flames, a witness to the engagement saw Connors persist in attacking the Do 17, which he subsequently shot down. His Hurricane, still in flames, crashed at Wallington. Connors, thrown clear of the wreckage, was killed. Shortly after his death, an award of a Bar to Connors's DFC was announced. Published on 6 September, the citation, which noted that he had since been killed in action, read:

This officer has led his flight in all its operations against enemy with great skill and courage; In a week of almost continuous action he shot down at least four enemy aircraft, bringing his total successes to twelve.

— London Gazette, No. 34940, 6 September 1940

Connors, who was survived by his wife Marjorie, was buried in North Berwick Cemetery. At the time of his death, Connors was credited with having shot down twelve German aircraft, with another two unconfirmed. He also had a shared in one unconfirmed aerial victory. In addition, he was credited with damaging four aircraft.
