= Dub, Lublin Voivodeship =

Dub
- Village
- Location within Poland
- Coordinates: 50°29′20″N 23°27′41″E
- Country: Poland
- Voivodeship: Lublin
- County: Tomaszów
- Gmina: Tomaszów Lubelski

Dub [dup] is a village in the administrative district of Gmina Tomaszów Lubelski, within Tomaszów County, Lublin Voivodeship, in eastern Poland.

== Administration ==
From 1975 to 1998, the village was administratively attached to the former Zamość Voivodeship.

Since 1999 it has been part of the new Lublin Voivodeship.
