= George Chamberlain Duncan =

United States Navy officer

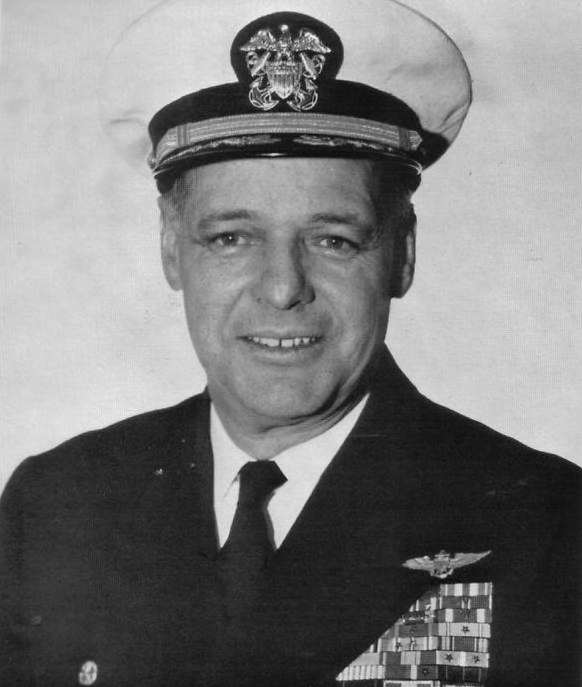
- Born: February 11, 1917; Tacoma, Washington, US
- Died: December 15, 1995 (aged 78); Arlington, Virginia, US
- Burial place: Arlington National Cemetery
- Spouse(s): Agnes Wirt Tawresey (1941-1972); Margaret Handy (1974-1980).
- Children: 4
- Military career
- Allegiance: United States
- Branch: United States Navy
- Service years: 1935–1968
- Rank: Captain
- Service number: O-82484
- Units: VF-15; VF-51; VF-101,
- Commands: VF-51; VF-101, USS Jupiter (AVS-8); USS Ranger (CV-61)
- Conflicts: World War II; Korean War; Vietnam War
- Awards: Navy Cross; Silver Star; Distinguished Flying Cross with one silver star and one gold star Air Medal

George Chamberlain Duncan (11 February 1917 – 15 December 1995) was a highly decorated United States Navy officer, World War Two veteran and flying ace. Born in Tacoma, Washington, he was credited with destroying 13 1/2 enemy aircraft and was awarded the Navy Cross during World War II.

He is best known for surviving the spectacular crash in 1951 of his Grumman F9F Panther (which was captured on film) while attempting to land on the USS Midway (CV-41).

== Early life ==
George Chamberlain Duncan was born on 11 February 1917 in Tacoma, Washington. He was the eldest of three children of Frances Delarsh (née Chamberlain) and mining supplier George W. Duncan. He had a younger brother and sister.

Duncan attended Stadium High School in Tacoma, where he was member of the swim and football teams and a member of the school's architecture, gliding and glee clubs. Duncan graduated in 1934. He had a cousin who went to the Naval Academy and made him aware of a career in the navy.

== Naval career ==
Duncan entered the United States Naval Academy at Annapolis on 18 July 1935 with the rank of midshipman. He graduated on 1 June 1939 with a commission as an Ensign.

Following his graduation he was assigned at his request to the battleship USS West Virginia (BB-48) on which he served from June 1939 to August 1941. He had requested this assignment as it was scheduled to go to Bremerton [Washington] for overhaul, which was close to home. Along with two others from the West Virginia he applied for and undertook flight training at Pensacola Naval Air Station in Florida from September 1941 until 13 March 1942.

=== World War II ===
After graduating from Pensacola he was assigned to fly Curtiss SOC Seagull observation seaplanes on the heavy cruiser USS Louisville (CA-28) on which he served in 1942 and 1943. During activities in the Aleutians, in August 1942 he was able to escape a Nakajima Rufe despite his aircraft being hit numerous times. Duncan was promoted to the rank of lieutenant (junior grade) on 1 June 1942 and on 15 June 1942, he was promoted to lieutenant (temporary).

When the number of seaplanes assigned to the ship was reduced from four to two, creating a surplus of pilots, Duncan found himself allocated to flying a Consolidated PBY-5A Catalina during which he undertook spotting duties during the bombardment of Munda in the Solomon Islands. He caught malaria which he later expressed gratitude for as he was sent back to the United States, where he undertook operational training on Grumman F4F Wildcats in Florida to transition to fighters. Following his graduation in mid-1943 he was assigned to the newly created Fighter Squadron VF-15 which was commissioned under the command of David McCampbell in Atlantic City on 1 September 1943. McCampbell had not flown for three years by the time he was given command of VF-15 and had trouble with his shooting skills. Pilots had to qualify in gunnery with a 10 percent score firing at a sleeve towed behind another aircraft. In the best of two attempts, McCampbell had scored only 8 percent. Determined that he should remain their commander, Duncan and John Robert Strane each made sure on the third flight that their bullets were painted the same color as McCampbell's, which ensured that a score of 15 percent was obtained by their commander. It didn't take McCampbell long to realizing what had happened. He subsequently ordered that every pilot undergo more frequent gunnery training.

Issued with Grumman F6F Hellcats the squadron was initially assigned to the USS Hornet (CV-12) but following the completion of the carrier's shakedown cruise it was reassigned (along with Duncan) to the USS Essex (CV-9) in May 1944. Duncan was promoted to lieutenant commander (temporary) 15 March 1944. On 15 June 1944 Duncan shot down his first Japanese aircraft, a Mitsubishi Zero near Iwo Jima. On 19 June during the "Marianas Turkey Shoot" component of the Battle of the Philippine Sea, Duncan shot down three more Zeros. Also in June he and the rest of the squadron made a concentrated strafing attack on a Fubuki-class destroyer, which eventually caused it to sink, despite the aircraft using only 0.50 cal machine guns.

He shot down his fifth enemy aircraft on 12 September 1944. On 13 September 1944, while engaged in air operations over the central islands of the Philippines, Duncan shot down a Japanese Betty medium bomber, one Oscar fighter, one Nate fighter, damaged a third fighter and shared credit for the shooting down of a second bomber. He followed this up by destroying three aircraft on the ground during a strafing attack on an airfield. For these actions, he was awarded the Silver Star. Besides escort duties he flew close air support missions during which his Hellcat was armed with a single bomb and in addition on occasion, 5-inch rockets.

He was involved in the air strikes on 24 October 1944 that sank the battleship Musashi. During combat off Cape Engaño on the morning of 25 October 1944, Duncan led VF-15 in an attack against Imperial Japanese Navy warships in the Sibuyan Sea. He then participated in bombing attacks on the Japanese light carrier Chitose, which caused it to sink. For his actions Duncan was awarded the Navy Cross. By early November of that same year, he had shot down four more enemy fighters.

Their tour completed, Duncan and the other members of VF-15 transferred to the USS Bunker Hill (CV-17), and sailed on 20 November for Pearl Harbor where they arrived on 29 November. On 1 December VF-15 departed on the Bunker Hill for the states arriving at Bremerton, Washington on 6 December 1944. During his tour of duty in the Pacific Duncan had completed 54 operational sorties and was ultimately credited with 13 1/2 aerial victories.

Following the squadron's return from the Pacific Duncan took over command of VF-15 from Lieutenant Commander James F. Rigg on 15 January 1945 and remained in that role until 25 February 1945.

=== Post-war ===
Following the end of the war Duncan remained in the navy, having in March 1945 enrolled to study aeronautical engineering at the Naval Postgraduate School at Annapolis, Maryland. This also involved studying at the Massachusetts Institute of Technology. After approximately 18 months he completed his studies in 1947 and was assigned the role of an engineer officer at ComNavAirPac. During his time there he kept his flying skills up by flying Grumman F7F Tigercats and Grumman F8F Bearcats.

He remained there for a couple of years and completed the 48-week Test Pilot Division course at United States Naval Test Pilot School at Naval Air Station Patuxent River from which he graduated in the third class in December 1949. During this period his prototype Vought XF6U-1 fighter hit the ground during a take-off, while on another test flight he was forced in 1949 to belly a XF6U-1 into the Chesapeake Bay in 1949. When he apologized to the head of the test center for the loss of the aircraft, he was told, “Forget it. It couldn’t have happened to a better airplane.” The Test Division's concluded that the underpowered aircraft was unacceptable for operational use, with Naval aviators disparagingly calling the aircraft the "groundhog". Other aircraft that he flew while at Patuxent included the Vought F7U Cutlass, Douglas F3D Skyknight, Douglas F4D Skyray and McDonnell F3H Demon. On 1 June 1949, he was first promoted to the permanent rank of lieutenant commander and then to the permanent rank of commander. Upon completion of his test pilot training he remained at Patuxent flight testing until 1952.

==== Crash on the USS Midway ====
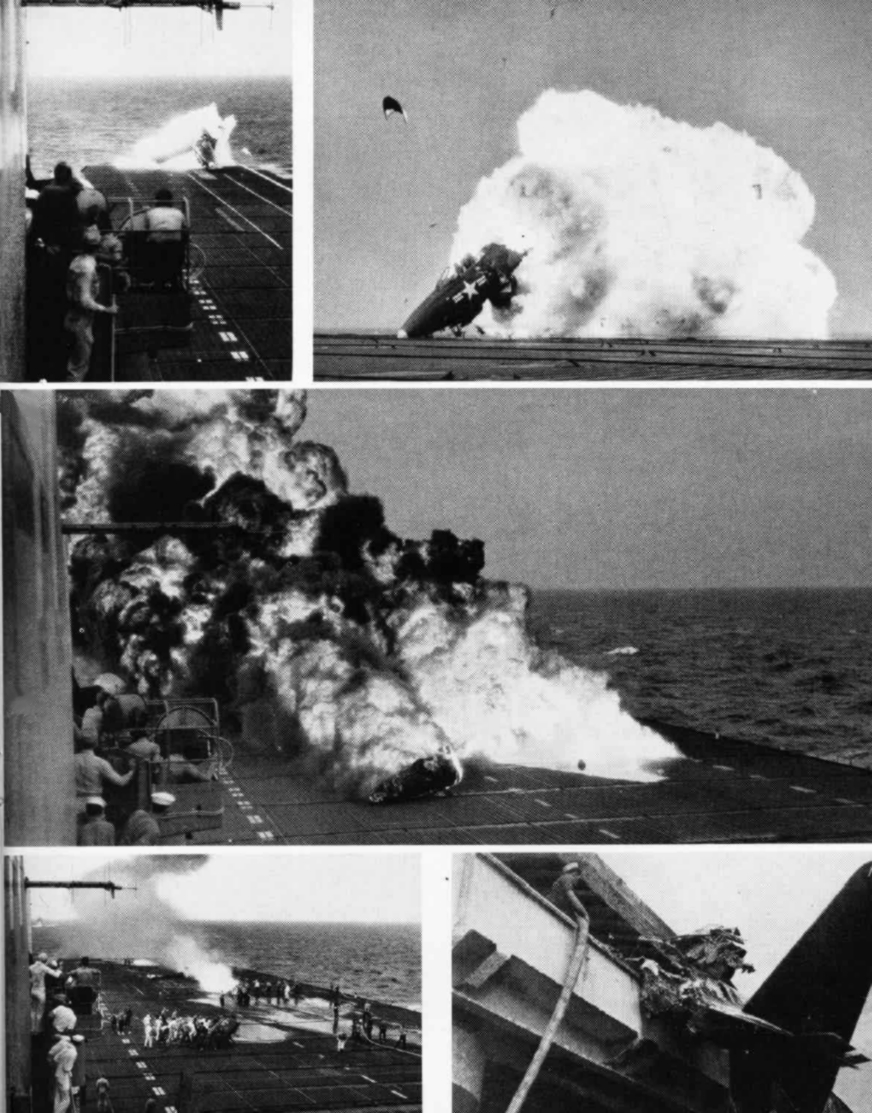
Cdr. Duncan's crash on USS Midway, 23 June 1951

In June 1951 he participated in suitability trials of the new Grumman F9F Panther BuNo 125228. The aircraft had been hoisted aboard the USS Midway (CV-41) at Norfolk, Virginia, and carried out into the Atlantic Ocean off the Virginia Capes. There, Duncan and his plane were catapulted off and on return trapped by the carrier's arresting gear without any problems.

On 23 June 1951, having already made a successful landing aboard Midway, Duncan, along with Edward L. Feightner who was testing a Vought F7U Cutlass, was catapulted off to make another approach and landing. Duncan soon realized that he was carrying too much fuel to make a safe landing. He jettisoned his tip tanks and flew around while Feightner made six successful landings. Eventually Duncan had burned off enough fuel and made his approach. Unfortunately, as he closed on the flight deck, a downdraft just aft of the stern caused the descending Panther to dip below the deck. Duncan was able to flick the nose of the aircraft upwards as the aircraft hit the edge of the flight deck. The ramp strike was severe enough to split the fuselage of the aircraft in half and engulfed the rear fuselage and engine in a fireball where it came to rest on the fantail, while the nose section of the aircraft tumbled down the flight deck,with Duncan inside, before coming to rest. The force of the impact forced Duncan's helmet off and threw loose the cockpit canopy, leaving him little protection. Sailors were able to pull Duncan from the wreckage and convey him to the sickbay. He was burned by the fire with his ears badly scorched, but he was able to return to flying duties six months later. However, it took a year before his injuries were completely healed.

Footage of Duncan's crash was captured as nearly every landing on an aircraft carrier is filmed for educational and safety purposes.

==== Korea ====
Duncan then returned to normal duty serving two tours in the Korean War, both with VF-51 during its deployment aboard the Essex-class aircraft carrier USS Valley Forge (CVA-45), the second as its commanding officer. He then went on to commanded Fighter Squadron VF-101, and later was Commander Air Group Carrier Air Group 5 (CVG-5). Duncan's next assignment was serving as the head of the Fighter Design Branch in the Bureau of Aeronautics (BuAir), before taking up a role as assistant director of the Aircraft Division in the Bureau of Naval Weapons (BuWeps). After these two years behind desk Duncan returned to sea duty as executive officer of the USS Forrestal (CV-59) on its first Mediterranean cruise. On 1 April 1958 Duncan was promoted to the rank of Captain.

==== Ship command ====
To progress to sea command of a naval carrier it was necessary for Duncan as a naval aviator to have commanded a “deep-draft” ship. This was provided by this next assignment which was as captain of aircraft stores ship USS Jupiter (AVS-8) from July 1961 to 24 March 1962., operating out of Yokosuka, Japan, with the 7th Fleet. As long as the ship turned up to resupply ships at the scheduled time Duncan was free to travel wherever he liked. He was popular with the wives of naval personnel stationed in Japan as the ship could be used to transport their shopping back from trips to Hong Kong.

With the necessary ship experience Duncan was then given command of the Forrestal-class aircraft carrier USS Ranger (CV-61) on 7 May 1962. He served in that role until 20 May 1963.

His next role was assistant chief of staff for operations at AIRPAC for a year before becoming chief of staff for two years. He was then transferred to Air Systems Command in Washington, before retiring from military service on 1 January 1968.

== Civilian career ==
During his Navy assignments to Washington, Duncan took law courses at George Washington University. This allowed him to receive a law degree from George Washington University within a year of retiring from the Navy. He practiced in Arlington. He had homes in Arlington, then St. Mary's City and finally in McLean.

Duncan died at the age of 78 on 15 December 1995 after a heart attack in an Arlington, Virginia restaurant. He is buried in Section 10 of the Arlington National Cemetery, Arlington, Virginia, alongside his first wife.

== Personal life ==
While an Ensign, Duncan married Agnes Wirt Tawresey at Washington, D.C., on 31 August 1941. She was the daughter of Agnes Wirt Hall and Alfred P Tawresey. The couple had four children, George, Jr., Alfred T., Agnes Gill, and Juli. Following the death of Agnes on 15 September 1972 he married Margaret Handy in 1974. She died in 1980.

== Awards and decorations ==
Duncan was awarded the Navy Cross, Silver Star; a Distinguished Flying Cross for his fifth air victory with one silver star and one gold star (seven awards); 15 Air Medals., a Bronze Star with V for Valor and on 4 November 1966 the Legion of Merit.

The Silver Star was awarded on 18 October 1944. The citation reads:

“For conspicuous gallantry and intrepidity as a Fighter Pilot in Fighting Squadron FIFTEEN (VF-15), attached to the U.S.S. ESSEX (CV-9), in action against enemy Japanese forces in the central Philippines, on 13 September 1944. Alert and aggressive while leading his division in a hazardous fighter sweep against the enemy, Lieutenant Commander Duncan courageously intercepted a group of hostile planes and, pressing home his assaults with grim determination, personally shot down one medium enemy bomber and rendered invaluable assistance to a fellow pilot in destroying another during this engagement. Subsequently attacked by a vastly superior force of Japanese fighters, he skillfully maneuvered his plane for maximum striking power and, despite the tremendous odds, succeeded in blasting two of the hostile craft from the sky and in damaging a third. In addition, although opposed by concentrated anti-aircraft fire, Lieutenant Commander Duncan launched repeated hazardous strafing runs against grounded enemy aircraft, setting fire to and destroying three grounded planes. By his inspiring leadership, resolute courage and unwavering devotion to duty throughout, Lieutenant Commander Duncan contributed materially to the success of his squadron and upheld the highest traditions of the United States Naval Service

The Navy Cross was awarded on 16 December 1944. The citation reads:

“For extraordinary heroism in operations against the enemy while serving as Pilot of a carrier-based Navy Fighter Plane in Fighting Squadron FIFTEEN (VF-15), attached to the U.S.S. ESSEX (CV-9), in action against enemy Japanese surface forces over the Sibuyan Sea during the Battle for Leyte Gulf in the Philippine Islands on 25 October 1944. Undaunted by hostile anti-aircraft fire, Lieutenant Commander Duncan carried out an attack against major units of the Japanese Fleet, scoring a direct bomb hit to assist in sinking an enemy carrier, and contributing to the success of the mission. By his skill as an airman and devotion to duty throughout, Lieutenant Commander Duncan upheld the highest traditions of the United States Naval Service.”

The Distinguished Flying Cross was awarded on 26 August 1947. The citation reads:

“For heroism and extraordinary achievement in aerial flight as Pilot of a Fighter Plane in Fighting Squadron FIFTEEN (VF-15), attached to the U.S.S. ESSEX (CV-9), in action against enemy Japanese forces in the Pacific War Area, on 6 November 1944. Skillfully fighting his plane, Lieutenant Commander Duncan engaged and shot down his fifth enemy aircraft on this date. His courage and devotion to duty were in keeping with the highest traditions of the United States Naval Service.”

== In popular culture ==
Footage of Duncan's crash on the Midway has been used in several movies, including Men of the Fighting Lady (realistically as an F9F, being flown by Keenan Wynn), Midway (where the SBD Dauntless flown by Charlton Heston transforms into an SB2C Helldiver in the approach sequence and then crashes as a Panther), and The Hunt for Red October (standing in for an F-14 Tomcat).
