= VF-15 =

Fighter Squadron 15
- Active: 1 September 1943 – 20 October 1945
- Country: United States
- Branch: United States Navy
- Type: Fighter
- Nickname: Satan's Playmates
- Engagements: World War II

Aircraft flown
- Fighter: F6F-3/5 Hellcat

Fighter Squadron 15 or VF-15 was an aviation unit of the United States Navy. Originally established on 1 September 1943, it was disestablished on 20 October 1945. During six months of combat in 1944 the squadron destroyed more enemy planes (312 in the air and 348 on the ground) than any other squadron in the Pacific War. Twenty-six of the squadron's pilots became aces.

== Operational history ==
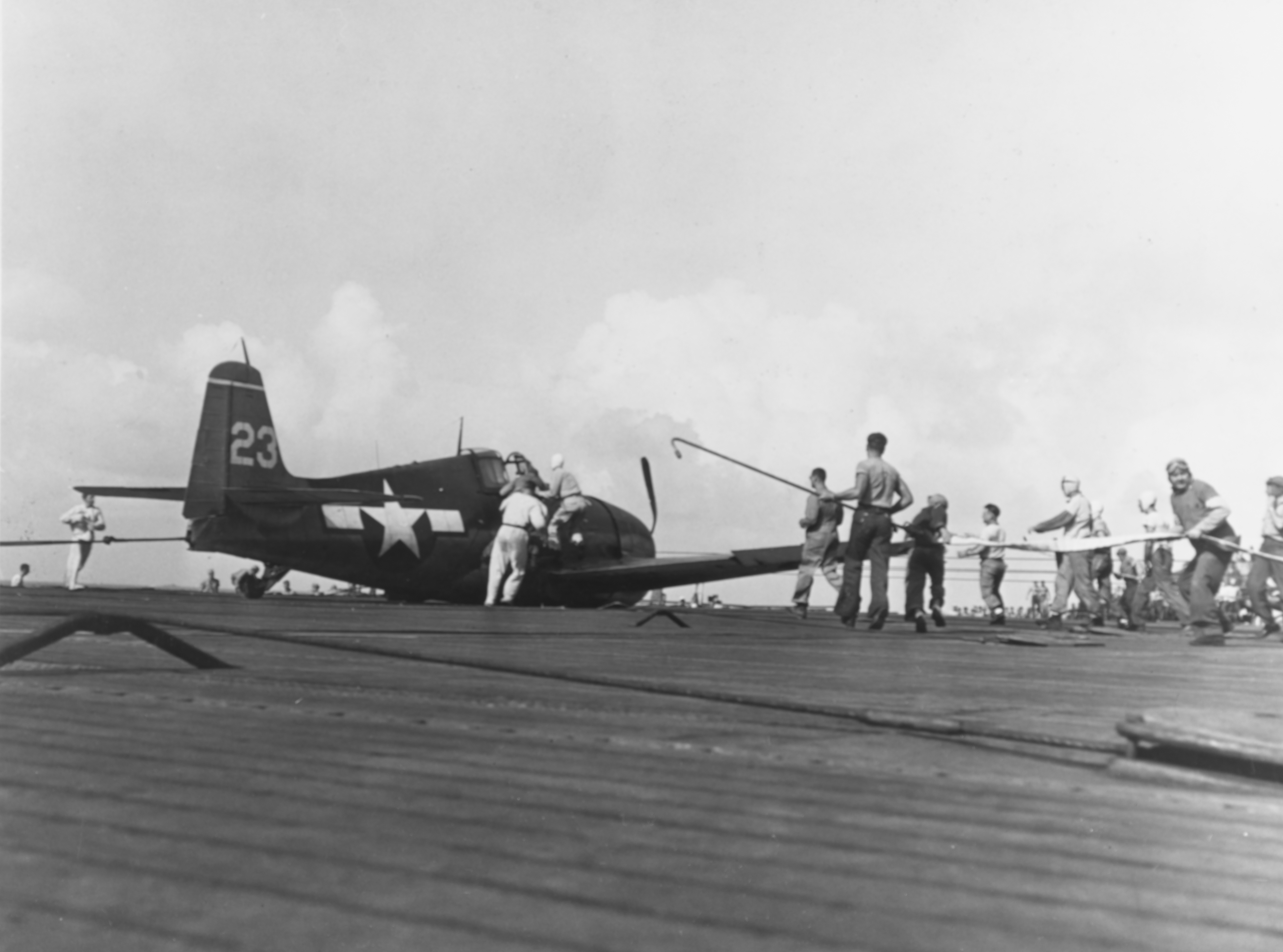
Flight deck crewman aboard the aircraft carrier USS Essex prepare to remove Lieutenant J.J. Collins of VF-15 from his Hellcat, after he crash-landed on board. Collins was seriously wounded, and his plane badly damaged, by Japanese anti-aircraft fire during a raid on Wake Island on 23 May 1944. Note the firefighting team at right.

The squadron was commissioned under the command of David McCampbell at the Naval Air Station at Atlantic City on 1 September 1943. McCampbell had not flown for three years by the time he was given command of VF-15 and had trouble with his shooting skills. Pilots had to qualify in gunnery with a 10 percent score firing at a sleeve between towed behind another aircraft. In the best of two attempts, McCampbell had scored only 8 percent. Determined that he should remain their commander George Chamberlain Duncan and John Robert Strane, each made sure on the third flight that their bullets were painted the same color as McCampbell's, which ensured that a score of 15 percent was obtained by their commander. It did not take McCampbell long to realize what had happened. He subsequently ordered that every pilot undergo more frequent gunnery training.

Issued with Grumman F6F Hellcats the squadron was assigned as part of Carrier Air Group 15 (CAG-15) which was under the command of commander William M. Drane. As well as VF15, the carrier air group included Bombing Squadron 15 (VB-15), Torpedo Squadron 15 (VT-15) and Night Fighter VF(N)-77. The carrier air group carried out their first joint coordinated shrike against a practice target on 15 November 1943 before in at the end of December VF-15 and some other parts of its carrier air group moved to Naval Air Station Norfolk. While there the number of pilots in the squadron had to be reduced from 45 to 40 which McCampbell accomplished by having the pilots participate in a secret ballot on who they most wanted to fly with and thus eliminating those with the fewest votes. After the squadron qualified on the USS Long Island (CVE-1) in Chesapeake Bay it embarked together with the rest of CAG-15 on the USS Hornet (CV-12) from 1 January 1944 onwards for a 17-day shakedown cruise with the first arrested landing being made by Drane.

The carrier was commanded by Miles Browning who was known among other officers as "the most intemperate man in the Navy." The carrier air group endured a large number of training accidents involving the newly introduced Curtiss SB2C Helldiver, which was underpowered, and suffered from inadequate stability and poor handling which made it difficult to fly. A number of members of VB-15 were killed by accidents during the cruise. Matters were not helped by Browning's leadership style and insistence that the pilots fly off using the aircraft manufacturers stated take-off distance for the Helldiver. Eventually Browning accepted Drane and McCampbell's argument that this distance had been obtained by an experienced test pilot and were not sufficient for a new pilot, especially those with just the 15 hours of flying time on the Helldiver that the VB-15 pilots had at the time they embarked on the carrier. Eventually Browning relented and gave them an extra 100 ft, which assisted in lowering the accident rate.

Upon the Hornet's return to Norfolk at the completion of the shakedown cruise CAG-15 disembarked from the ship on 2 February 1944 for Naval Air Squadron Norfolk while the carrier entered dry dock for remedial action. The commander of VB-15 had already transferred due to the stress of dealing with Browning, so Browning now took the opportunity to replace Drane with McCampbell. Charles Walter Brewer took over command of VF-15, while James Haile Mini was brought in to take over VB-15.

The Hornet with the carrier air group back on board departed on 13 January for Pearl Harbor via the Panama Canal and San Diego. Accidents continued to happen and aircrew lost their lives.

Upon the Hornet's arrival at Ford Island in Pearl Harbor on 4 March 1944 Browning declared that CAG-15 was unready for combat. Carrier Air Group 2 had been scheduled to be assigned to the USS Essex (CV-9), but this carrier's availability was affected by the need for an overhaul, so Air Group 2 embarked aboard the Hornet on 8 March 1944. Browning was to later lose his command in May 1944. McCampbell later described Browning as ‘the captain from Hell."

Delighted to be off the Hornet VF-15 and the rest of CAG-15 were meanwhile disembarked and underwent six weeks’ intensive training (which proved beneficial) before reporting for duty on Essex on 29 April 1944, upon the carriers return to the Pacific. CAG-15 deployed with 36 x SB2C-1C Helldivers in VB-15, 37 x F6F-3 Hellcats in VF-15, 20 x TBF/M-1C Avengers in VT-15 and six F6F-3N Hellcats in VF(N)-77.

The Essex then joined carriers Wasp and San Jacinto, five cruisers and 12 destroyers in TG 12.1 where the air crews of the carriers were "broken in" with strikes on Marcus Island on 19 to 20 May 1944, during which two Hellcats and two Helldivers were lost. TG 12.1 then make five strikes on Wake Island, on 23 May 1944. The Essex then departed Majuro on 5 June with TF 58 to support the occupation of the Marianas from 12 June to 13 August, during which CAG-15 conducted 3,078 sorties shooting down 104 aircraft and destroying another 136 on the ground or in the water, as well as sinking or damaged 60 ships. Among the highlights was 12 June when the Essex dispatched five strikes during which they destroyed a cargo ship and a destroyer for the loss of five Avengers. This sunk destroyer may have been the Fubuki-class destroyer which the squadron's Hellcats sunk after having subjected it to a concentrated strafing attack despite the aircraft using only 0.50 cal machine guns. Another was on 19 June when they destroyed 63 enemy aircraft, however the triumph was diminished by the loss of Brewer and his wingman Thomas Tarr. Brewer was succeeded by James F. Rigg.

On 20 June 1944 the squadron participated in the Marianas Turkey Shoot during which it was credited with 68½ aerial victories, the most in one day of any Navy squadron. Among the pilots who contributed to this tally were nine shot down by CAG-15's commander David McCampbell. On 22 June 29 aircrew were picked up from the water after they were forced to ditch in the sea running out of fuel on the return from a long range strike. On 23 June 23 three strikes were made on Guam with 12 aircraft shot down and three probables.

At the expense of VB-15 which had its allocation of Helldivers decreased by five aircraft, VF-15's complement of Hellcats was increased to 49 as the Essex commenced operations with TG 38.3 on 29 August against the Palau Islands. TF 38 was the designation used when this fast carrier task force was assigned to Third Fleet, while TF 58 was used when it was assigned to Fifth Fleet. Operations continued against Palau on 6 to 8 September, and Mindanao on 9 to 10 September with enemy shipping as the main target, and remained in the area to support landings on Peleliu.

While replenishing at Ulithi in the Caroline Islands it was necessary for the Essex to put out to sea to weather a typhoon on 2 October. Four days the carrier later departed with Task Force 38 (TF 38) for the Ryukyus. TF 38 was actually the same formation as TF 58, the nomenclature being changed to reflect the rotation of command staffs employed by the Navy for efficiency in executing multiple operations; this rotation allowed constant front-line deployment of the ships and their crews while providing operational planning time at better-equipped, rear-area base facilities for the command structure not currently afloat. Once in the Ryukyus CAG-15 participated in strikes against Okinawa on 10 October, before attacking Formosa from 12 to 14 October.

The carrier and CAG-15 then headed as part of TF 38.3 to the Philippines to cover the Leyte landings, taking part in the Battle of Leyte Gulf 24 to 25 October, during which the squadron and the rest of CAG-15 was involved in the air strikes on 24 October 1944 that sank the battleship Musashi. During combat off Cape Engaño on 25 October 1944, VF-15 was involved in supporting attacks by TF 38.3 in the Sibuyan Sea on a Japanese fleet led by Vice Admiral Jisaburo Ozawa, which sank first the carrier Chitose and then the carrier Zuikaku.

TF 38 continuing the search for enemy fleet units until 30 October, when the Essex returned to Ulithi for replenishment. The Essex resumed the offensive with CAG-15 delivering attacks on Manila and the northern Philippine Islands during early November before CAG-15 was relieved on 18 November 1944 by CAG-4 (which kept most of its predecessor's aircraft).

On 18 November the personnel of CAG-15 transferred to the USS Bunker Hill (CV-17), and sailed on 20 November for Pearl Harbor where it arrived on 29 November. On 1 December CAG-15 departed on the Bunker Hill for the states arriving at Bremerton, Washington on 6 December 1944.

During its Pacific deployment CAG-15 accumulated more than 20,000 hours of air combat operations with VF-15 credited with destroying 312 enemy aircraft in aerial combat with another 33 probably destroyed and 65 damaged, while its ground attacks had destroyed another 348 with 161 probably destroyed and 129 damaged. Twenty-six of the squadron's pilots became aces. However 21 pilots were killed in action and one in an operational accident. CAG-15 sank 174,300 tons and damaged 38,500 tons of merchant shipping (which included 37 merchant vessels sunk, 10 probably sunk and 39 damaged). In addition the carrier air group sunk 77,200 tons of warships (which included the battleship Musashi, the carrier Zuikaku, a light aircraft carrier, a destroyer, a destroyer escort, two minesweepers, five escort ships, two motor torpedo boats) and damaged 217,450 tons of warships.

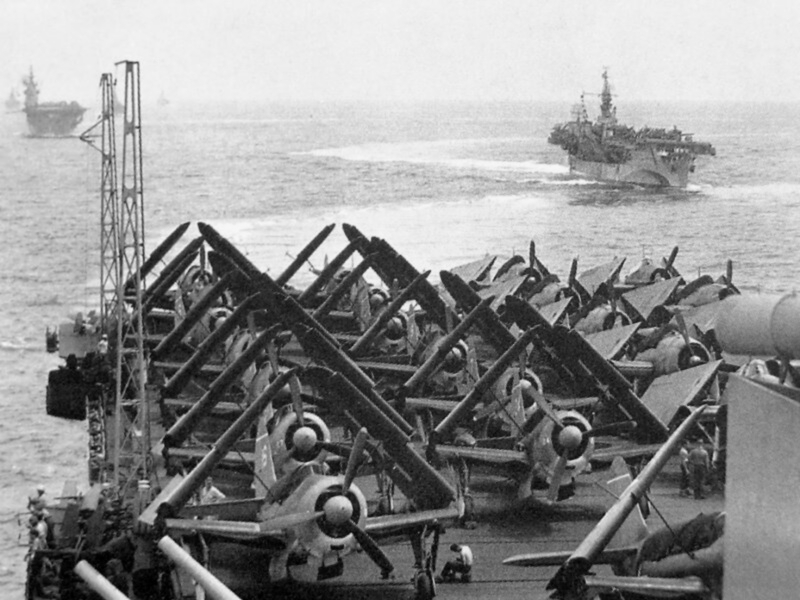
The USS Essex turns into the wind on 27 May 1944, just before the Marianas campaign. The light carrier behind (right of frame) is USS San Jacinto (CVL-30) and the carrier (top left of frame) is USS Wasp (CV-18). Curtiss SB2C Helldiver and Grumman TBF Avenger bombers of CAG-15 are visible on Essex` flight deck.

== Commanding officers ==
- Commander David McCampbell: 1 September 1943 to 9 February 1944.
- Commander Charles Walter Brewer: 9 February 1944 to 19 June 1944. He was shot down and killed on 19 June 1944. With 6½ confirmed enemy aircraft shot down in combat, he was the recipient of the Navy Cross, three Distinguished Flying Crosses and the Legion of Merit. The U.S. Naval Air Station at Agana on the island of Guam, was renamed for Brewer in 1973.
- Lieutenant Commander James F. Rigg: 19 June 1944 to 15 .January 1945.
- Lieutenant Commander George Chamberlain Duncan: 15 January 1945 to 25 February 1945.
- Lieutenant Commander Gordon E. Firebaugh: 25 February 1945 to 20 October 1945.

== Notable members of the squadron ==
- Clarence "Spike" Alvin Borley, the U.S. Navy's youngest ace.
- George Raines Carr, 11½ Japanese aircraft destroyed.
- George Chamberlain Duncan.
- James Edward Duffy, five Japanese aircraft destroyed.
- David McCampbell.
- Bert DeWayne Morris.
- James F. Rigg.
- John R. Strane, 13 Japanese aircraft destroyed.
- Roy Warrick Rushing, 13 Japanese aircraft destroyed. He became an "Ace in a day" on 24 October 1944.
- Arthur Singer Jr, 10 Japanese aircraft destroyed.
- Wendell Van Twelves, 13 Japanese aircraft destroyed.

== See also ==
- History of the United States Navy
- List of inactive United States Navy aircraft squadrons
- List of United States Navy aircraft squadrons
