= James Rigg =

James Rigg may refer to:

- James F. Rigg, World War II American ace pilot
- James Harrison Rigg, English nonconformist minister and Methodist educator

== See also ==
- James Riggs (disambiguation)
