= USS McCampbell =

Arleigh Burke-class destroyer

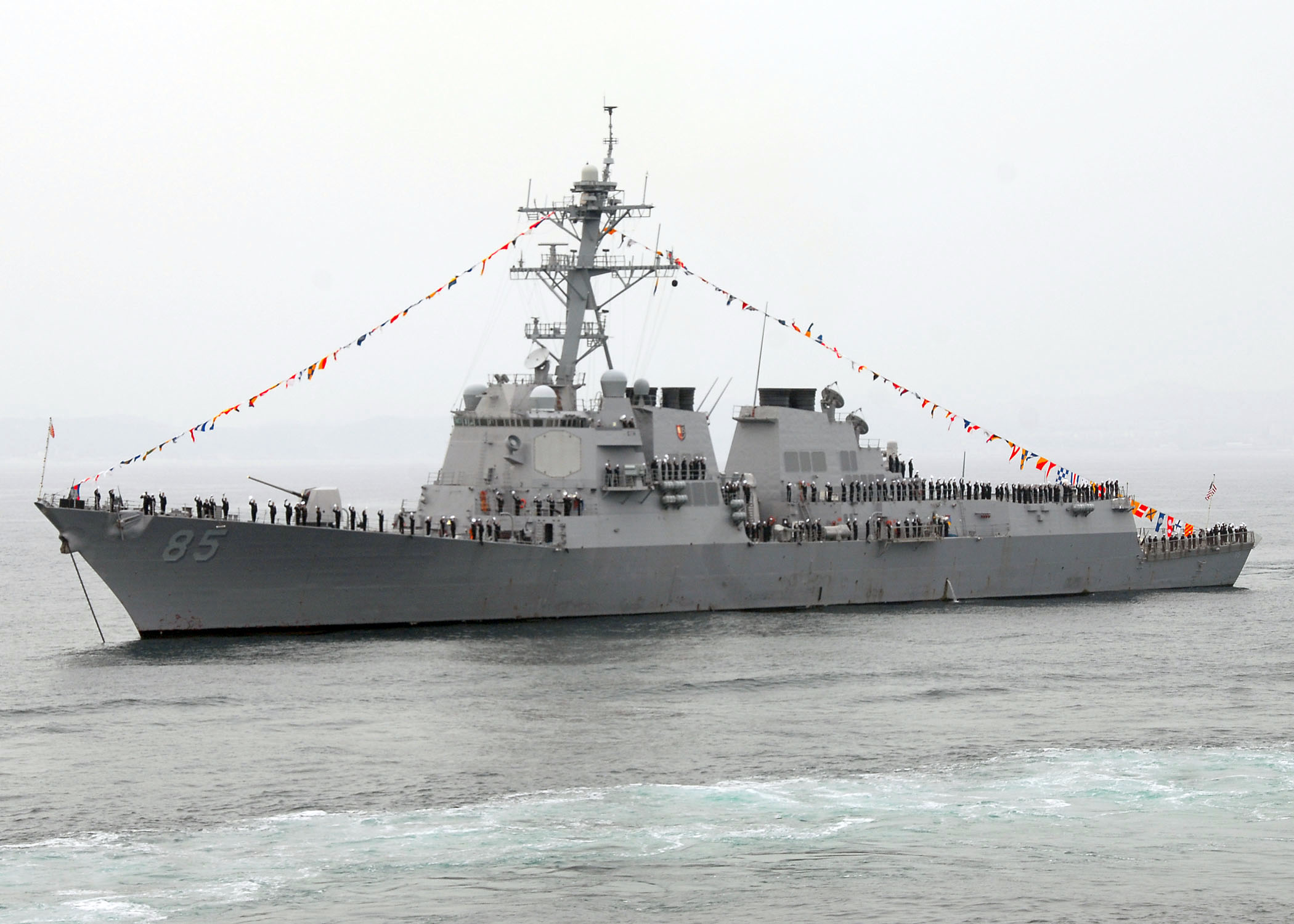
- USS McCampbell on 7 October 2008

History

United States
- Name: McCampbell
- Namesake: David McCampbell
- Ordered: 13 December 1996
- Builder: Bath Iron Works, Bath, Maine
- Laid down: 15 July 1999
- Launched: 2 July 2000
- Commissioned: 17 August 2002
- Home port: Yokosuka
- Identification: MMSI number: 303891000; Callsign: NMCB; Hull number: DDG-85
- Motto: Relentless in Battle
- Status: in active service
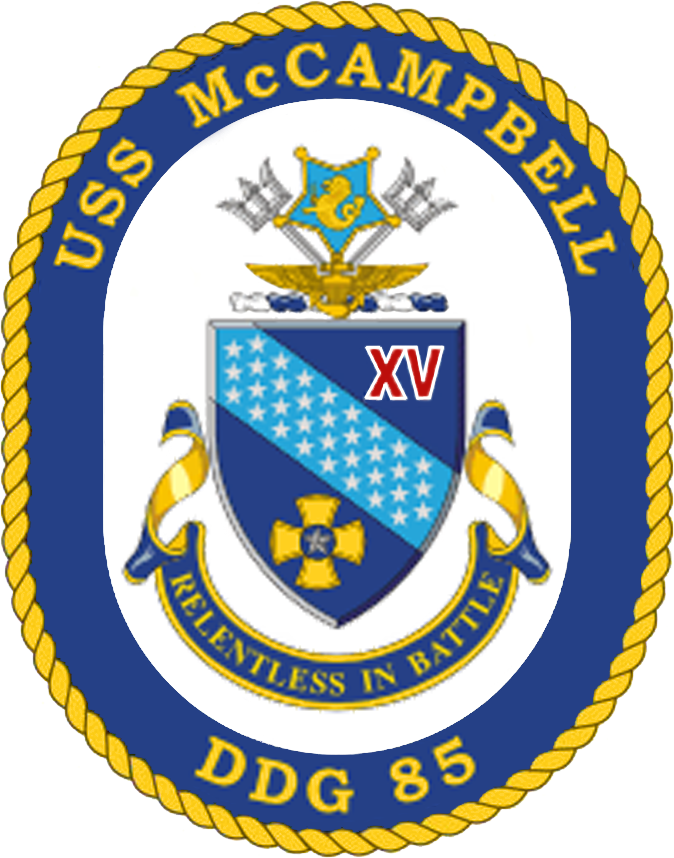
- Badge

General characteristics
- Class & type: Arleigh Burke-class destroyer
- Displacement: 9,200 tons
- Length: 509 ft 6 in (155.30 m)
- Beam: 66 ft (20 m)
- Draft: 31 ft (9.4 m)
- Propulsion: 4 × General Electric LM2500-30 gas turbines, 2 shafts, 100,000 shp (75 MW)
- Speed: exceeds 30 knots (56 km/h; 35 mph)
- Complement: 380 officers and enlisted
- Armament: Guns: 1 × 5-inch (127 mm)/62 Mk 45 Mod 4 (lightweight gun); 1 × 20 mm (0.8 in) Phalanx CIWS; 2 × 25 mm (0.98 in) Mk 38 machine gun system; 4 × 0.50 in (12.7 mm) caliber guns; Missiles: 1 × 32-cell, 1 × 64-cell (96 total cells) Mk 41 vertical launching system (VLS): RIM-66M surface-to-air missile; RIM-156 surface-to-air missile; RIM-174A Standard ERAM; RIM-161 anti-ballistic missile; RIM-162 ESSM (quad-packed); BGM-109 Tomahawk cruise missile; RUM-139 vertical launch ASROC; Torpedoes: 2 × Mark 32 triple torpedo tubes: Mark 46 lightweight torpedo; Mark 50 lightweight torpedo; Mark 54 lightweight torpedo
- Aircraft carried: 2 × MH-60R Seahawk helicopters

USS McCampbell (DDG-85) is an Arleigh Burke-class (Flight IIA) Aegis guided missile destroyer in the United States Navy. She is named in honor of Naval Aviator Captain David S. McCampbell, a Medal of Honor and Navy Cross recipient who was the Navy's leading ace in World War II. USS McCampbell was the 20th ship of this class to be built by Bath Iron Works at Bath, Maine, and construction began on 16 July 1999. She was launched and christened on 2 July 2000. On 17 August 2002, the commissioning ceremony was held at Pier 30 in San Francisco, California.

== Service history ==
She arrived at Yokosuka Naval Base in Yokosuka, Japan as part of the Navy's Seventh Fleet in July 2007, and was then permanently forward deployed there.

On 23 June 2009, McCampbell replaced USS John S. McCain in shadowing the North Korean ship Kang Nam 1 toward Burma in enforcement of a new United Nations resolution, United Nations Security Council Resolution 1874.

In March 2011, McCampbell was the first US Navy vessel on station off northeastern Honshu, Japan to assist with relief efforts after the 2011 Tōhoku earthquake and deliver food, supplies, and other material aid directly to survivors. Later, after the arrival of the aircraft carrier Ronald Reagan, the ship continued relief efforts as an element in Carrier Strike Group Seven, using the carrier as a supply distribution hub through early April.

On 13 June 2011, McCampbell intercepted the North Korean-flagged merchant vessel MV Light, en route to Myanmar, on 26 May, south of Shanghai. McCampbell requested permission to board the vessel, which was suspected of carrying missile technology, but was refused. After several days MV Light turned around and returned to North Korea, tracked by surveillance aircraft and satellites.

McCampbell rescued five Philippine fishermen on or about 24 October 2012. During a routine night mission, the embarked helicopter crew of McCampbell discovered five men signaling for help aboard a mostly-sunk fishing vessel. The helicopter crew deployed flotation rafts while McCampbell dispatched two boats, along with a translator, to assist in the rescue. McCampbell was operating with George Washington and Carrier Strike Group Five at that time.

McCampbell maintains on board an active VBSS team to conduct anti-piracy, anti-smuggling, and anti-terrorist operations. The ship was an active participant in IMDEX, and the VBSS team was a centerpiece in the multilateral training effort held in conjunction with the exposition.

On 24 January 2019, McCampbell sailed through the Taiwan Strait on orders from the US Pacific Fleet. McCampbell and replenishment oiler Walter S. Diehl "conducted a routine Taiwan Strait Transit" that was "in accordance with international law."

In July 2020 the ship left Yokosuka for Portland, Oregon to begin a midlife update at Vigor Industrial. While the update had a set cost of US$133.4 million, with contract options that could rise up to as much as US$155.6 million.

On 5 February 2024, the U.S. Navy announced that USS McCampbell would forward deploy to Yokosuka, Japan. McCampbell would replace USS Antietam, which would depart Yokosuka, Japan, and move to Pearl Harbor, Hawaii, as part of a scheduled rotation of forces in the Pacific.

On 8 February 2024, the USS McCampbell, in collaboration with the Missile Defense Agency (MDA), successfully conducted Flight Test Other-23 (FTX-23), also known as Stellar Sisyphus, off the coast of the Pacific Missile Range Facility, Kauai, Hawaii. This two-part developmental test involved evaluating sensor tracking and communications link capabilities.

On 2 March 2024, USS McCampbell returned to Yokosuka, Japan after a four-year-long modernization period in the United States, rejoining her sister ships as part of Destroyer Squadron Fifteen.

== Coat of arms ==
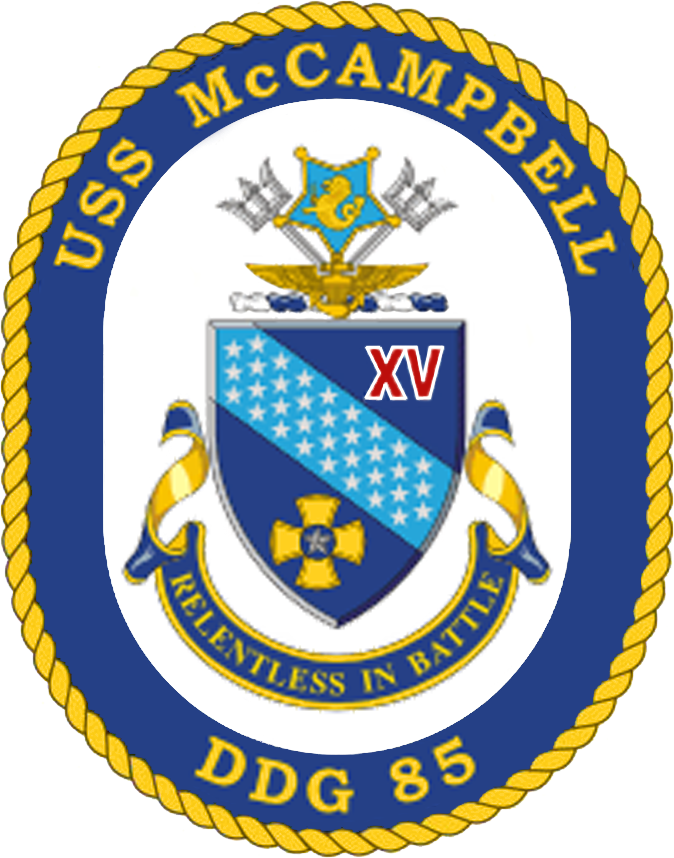

=== Shield ===
The shield has background of blue with a diagonal light blue band. Roman numerals for the number fifteen are located above the band while the Navy Cross is below.

The traditional Navy colors were chosen for the shield because dark blue and gold represents the sea and excellence respectively. The light blue band refers to the Pacific theater, where Captain McCampbell's served as commander of Air Group 15. In the band, there are thirty-four stars representing the number of enemy aircraft Captain McCampbell destroyed in air to air combat. This distinguished him as the leading naval ace in World War II. The Roman numeral "XV" signifies the "Fabled Fifteen" which embarked on USS Essex. The Navy Cross with a Silver Star center symbolize Captain McCampbell's bravery during combat in the Philippines.

=== Crest ===
The crest consists of a winged shield under a reversed star surrounded by tridents.

The reversed star refers to Captain McCampbell's Medal of Honor which was awarded for heroism in both the first and second battles of the Philippine Sea. The sea lion represents the Republic of the Philippines government seal. Two tridents, symbolizing sea prowess, surround the star and signifying the AEGIS system's firepower and strike capability. Representing the United States coat of arms is the winged shield to symbolize naval aviator wings which was Captain McCampbell's area of specialty.

=== Motto ===
The motto is written on a scroll of blue that has a gold reverse side.

The ships motto is "Relentless in Battle". The motto is a reference to both the honorable feats of Captain McCampbell and the Medal of Honor he received.

=== Seal ===
The coat of arms in full color as in the blazon, upon a white background enclosed within a dark blue oval border edged on the outside with a gold rope and bearing the inscription "USS McCampbell" at the top and "DDG 85" in the base all gold.
