= James F. Rigg =

WWII Ace

US Navy captain James F. Rigg
- Born: James Francis Rigg; July 18, 1915; Saginaw, Michigan
- Died: July 11, 2004 (aged 88)
- Burial place: Arlington National Cemetery Quadrant I
- Spouse: Priscilla (nee) Adams
- Relatives: Children: Sally Meats; James F. Rigg Jr.
- Military career
- Allegiance: United States
- Branch: United States Navy Air Corps
- Service years: 1941-1963
- Rank: Lieutenant Commander
- Nickname: Speedy
- Unit: Fighting Squadron 15 (VF-15)
- Awards: Congressional Gold Medal; Navy Cross; 6 Distinguished Flying Crosses; Bronze Star Medal; 10 Air medals

Cpt James Francis Rigg (July 18, 1915 - July 11, 2004) from Saginaw, Michigan was a World War II Double Ace pilot who shot down eleven Japanese aircraft in the Pacific Theatre of World War II, including a Japanese Ace.

== Education ==
Rigg was a student at the University of Michigan.

== Career ==
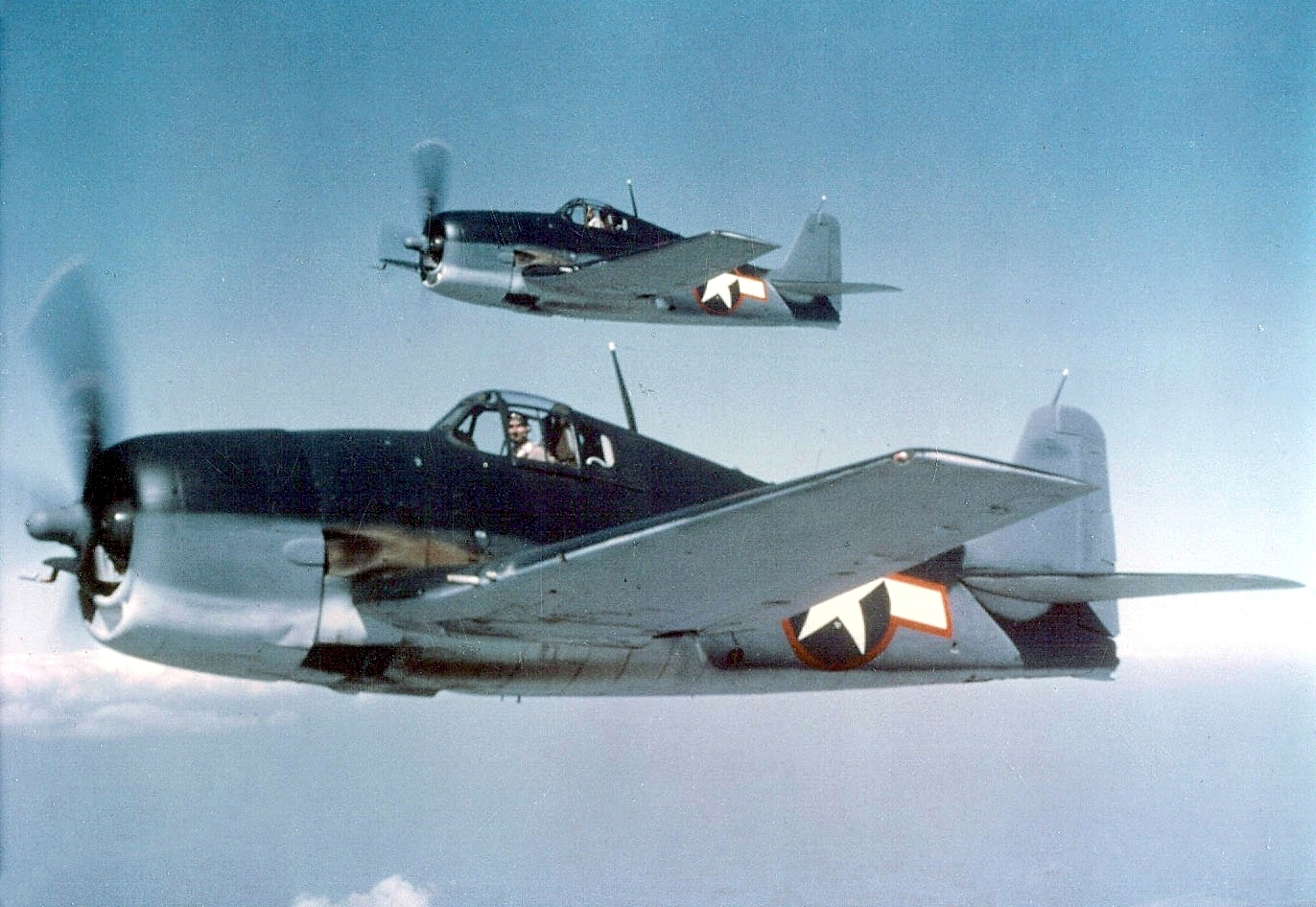
Photo of a Grumman F6F Hellcat

In July 1937 he joined the U.S. Navy Air Corps and became a fighter pilot. During World War II Rigg as assigned to Fighter Squadron 15 (VF-15) and served on the USS Essex. Following the death of the squadron's commander Charles Walter Brewer, Rigg took over command of VF-15 on 19 June 1944 and served in that role until 15 January 1945.

While in commanding his squadron of Hellcats in the Philippines, he shot down five Japanese aircraft in one day. He was also given credit for sinking an enemy destroyer ship. His nickname was Speedy, and he was ranked the 12th Naval Ace of WWII. He was given credit for eleven and one half kills. He earned his reputation as part of the Carrier Air Group (CAG-15) commanded by David McCampbell.

== Awards ==
- Congressional Gold Medal (2015)
- Navy Cross (Note: He was awarded the Navy Cross for heroism in leading a squadron that had 17 enemy kills in the Philippines September 12, 1944. He alone shot down 5 enemy planes that day.)
- 6 Distinguished Flying Crosses
- Bronze Star Medal
- 10 Air medals
- In 2004 he was inducted into the Rhode Island Aviation Hall of Fame

== See also ==
- List of World War II aces from the United States
- List of World War II flying aces
