= James Riggs =

James Riggs may refer to:

- James M. Riggs (1839–1933), U.S. Representative from Illinois
- Jim Riggs (born 1941), American saxophonist, retired professor of music
- Jim Riggs (American football) (born 1963), American football player

== See also ==
- James Rigg (disambiguation)
