= David McCampbell =

United States Navy Medal of Honor recipient and World War II flying ace

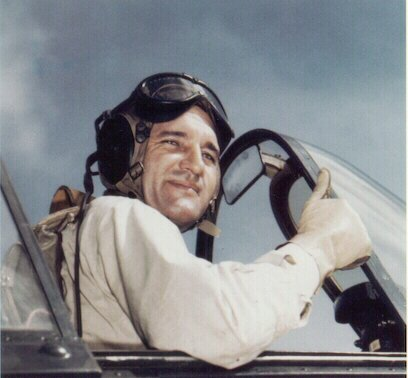
- David McCampbell in the cockpit, c. 1943
- Born: January 16, 1910; Bessemer, Alabama, US
- Died: June 30, 1996 (aged 86); Riviera Beach, Florida, US
- Burial place: Arlington National Cemetery
- Military career
- Allegiance: United States
- Branch: United States Navy
- Service years: 1933–1964
- Rank: Captain
- Commands: USS Bon Homme Richard; USS Severn; Carrier Air Group 15; VF-15
- Conflicts: World War II; Battle of the Philippine Sea; Mariana and Palau Islands campaign; Battle of Iwo Jima; Formosa Air Battle; Battle of Okinawa; Battle of Leyte Gulf
- Awards: Medal of Honor; Navy Cross; Silver Star; Legion of Merit with "V" device Distinguished Flying Cross (3); Air Medal (2)

Captain David McCampbell (January 16, 1910 – June 30, 1996) was a United States Navy captain, naval aviator, and Medal of Honor recipient. He retired from the Navy in 1964 with 31 years of service.

McCampbell is the United States Navy's all-time leading flying ace (called Ace of the Aces in the Navy) and top F6F Hellcat ace with 34 aerial victories. He was the third-highest American scoring ace of World War II and the highest-scoring American ace to survive the war. He also set a United States single mission aerial combat record of shooting down nine enemy planes in one mission, on October 24, 1944, at the beginning of the Battle of Leyte Gulf, in the Philippines.

== Early life ==
McCampbell was born in Bessemer, Alabama. When aged around 12, his family moved to West Palm Beach, Florida. He attended the Staunton Military Academy in Virginia, and studied one year at the Georgia School of Technology in Atlanta. There, he joined the US Navy ROTC, played football, was on the swim team, and was a member of the Alpha Sigma chapter of Kappa Alpha Order.

In 1929, McCampbell was appointed to United States Naval Academy, where he again played football and was on the swim team. He graduated in the class of 1933 with a degree in marine engineering. However, the Great Depression meant there were not enough Navy commissions available for Academy graduates, so he was immediately placed in the United States Navy Reserve. He returned to Atlanta and spent a year working in construction and at an aircraft assembly plant.

== United States Navy ==
On June 1, 1934, McCampbell was ordered to report for active duty and was commissioned as an ensign. He went on active duty on June 14, 1934, and served aboard the heavy cruiser USS Portland from June 1934 to June 1937, before starting flight training at Naval Air Station Pensacola, Florida. He received his "wings of gold" as a Naval Aviator on April 21, 1938 and was assigned to Fighter Squadron Four (VF-4) on the aircraft carrier USS Ranger in May 1940.

=== World War II ===
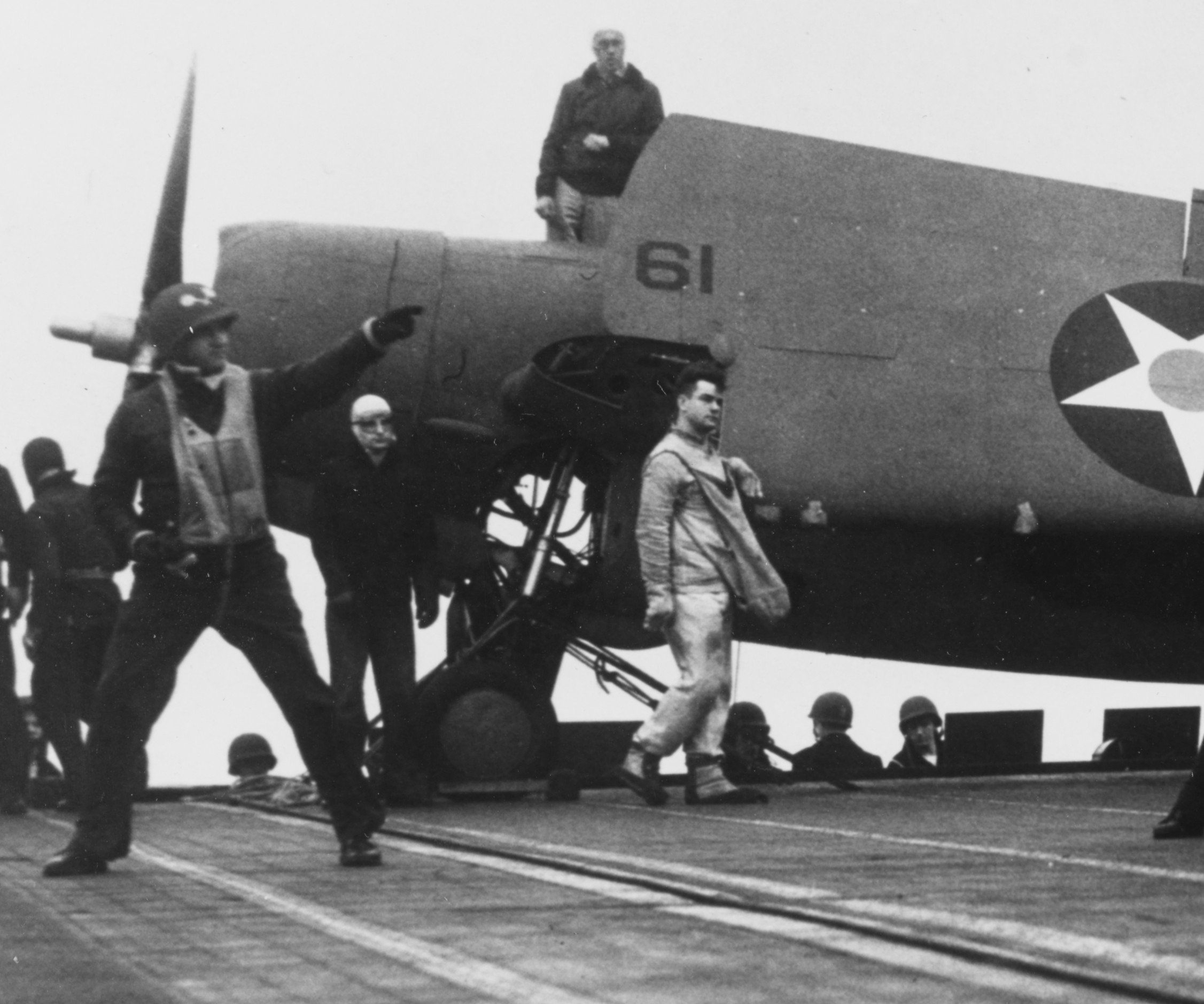
McCampbell while serving as a landing signal officer on board USS Wasp during Operation Bowery. He is signalling to a pilot about to take off, May 1942

McCampbell served as a landing signal officer (LSO) from May 1940, surviving the sinking of the carrier USS Wasp (CV-7) by a Japanese submarine near Guadalcanal on September 15, 1942. He returned to the United States, was promoted to lieutenant commander, and was stationed at Naval Air Station Melbourne, Florida, as an LSO Instructor until August 1943.

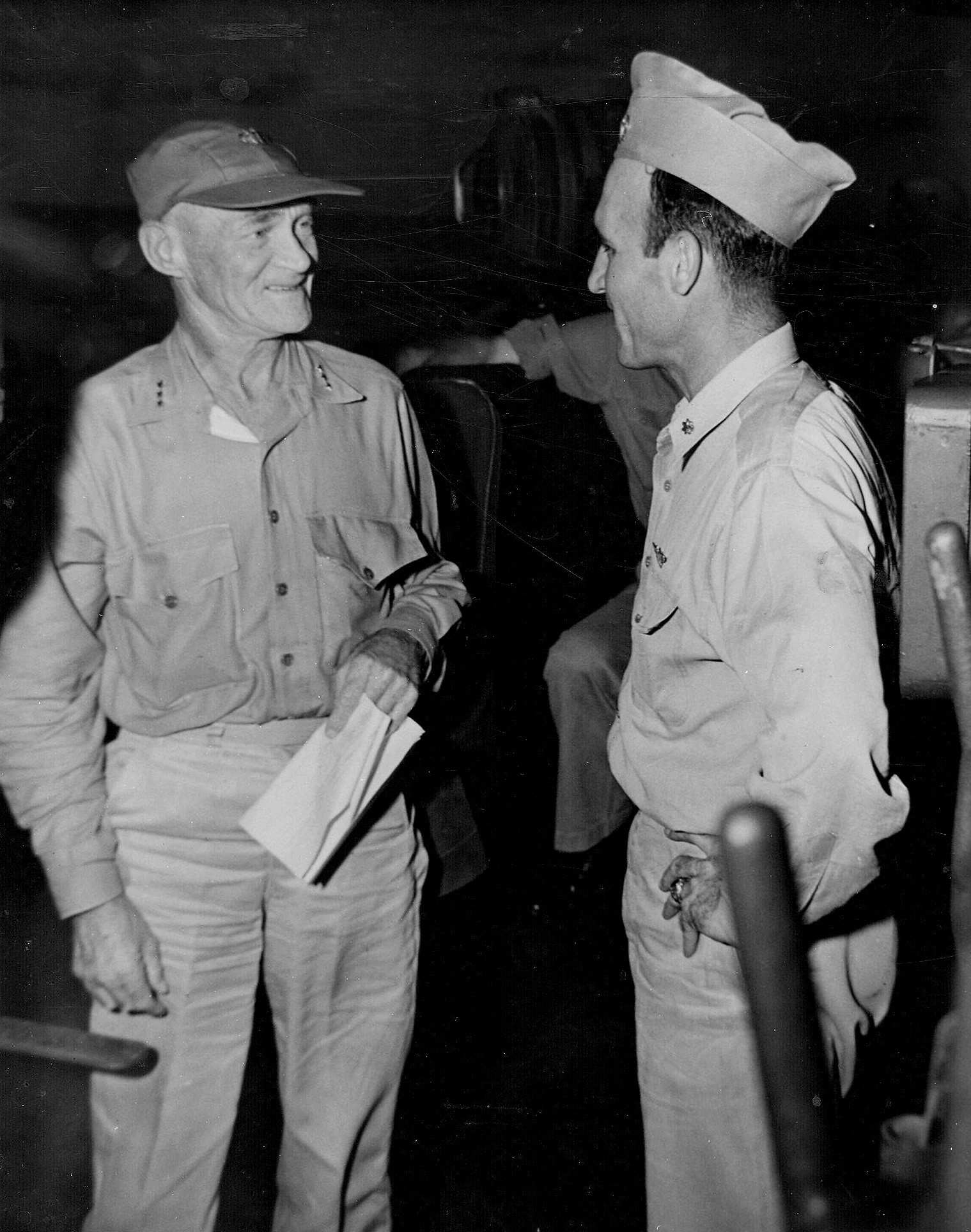
Vice Admiral Marc Mitscher speaks with Air Group Commander McCampbell, the task force's leading pilot.

McCampbell formed Fighter Squadron 15 (VF-15) on September 1, 1943, and led the squadron before being reassigned as Commander of Air Group 15 (CAG-15) from February to September 1944. As Commander, Carrier Air Group (CAG) 15, he was Commander of the Air Group (fighters, bombers, and torpedo bombers) when the group was embarked on the aircraft carrier USS Essex. In six months of combat from April to November 1944, his group participated in two major air-sea battles, the Battle of the Philippine Sea and the Battle of Leyte Gulf. In more than 20,000 hours of air combat operations before it returned to the United States for a rest period, Air Group 15 destroyed more enemy planes (315 airborne and 348 on the ground) and sank more enemy shipping than any other air group in the Pacific War. Air Group 15's attacks on the Japanese in the Marianas and at Iwo Jima, Taiwan, and Okinawa were key to the success of the "island hopping" campaign.

In addition to his duties as commander of the "Fabled Fifteen", then-Commander McCampbell became the Navy's "ace of aces" in 1944. McCampbell entered combat on May 14 and flew at least four Grumman F6F Hellcats while aboard the Essex: an F6F-3 named Monsoon Maiden (damaged by AA, removed from service on 20 May 1944), an F6F-3 named The Minsi (10 1/2 kills), an F6F-5 named Minsi II, and an F6F-5 named Minsi III (Bureau Number 70143), in which he scored the last 23 1/2 of his 34 kills. On June 19, 1944, during the "Marianas Turkey Shoot," Commander McCampbell shot down five Japanese Yokosuka D4Y "Judy" dive-bombers, to become an "ace in a day". Later that afternoon, during a second sortie, McCampbell downed two Mitsubishi A6M "Zeros" over Guam.

On October 24, 1944, in the initial phase of the Battle of Leyte Gulf, in the Philippines, he became the only American airman to achieve "ace in a day" status twice. McCampbell and his wingman attacked a Japanese force of 60 aircraft. McCampbell shot down nine aircraft—seven Zeros and two Nakajima Ki-43 "Oscar" fighters—setting an American single-mission aerial combat record. During this same action, his wingman downed six aircraft. When he landed his Hellcat aboard the USS Langley (the flight deck of Essex was not clear), his six machine guns had just two rounds remaining, and his airplane had to be manually released from the arrestor wire due to complete fuel exhaustion. Commander McCampbell received the Medal of Honor for both actions, becoming the only Fast Carrier Task Force aviator to be so honored.

=== Aerial victories ===
Date	Total	Aircraft claimed (location)
June 11, 1944	1	Zero (Saipan, Mariana Islands)
June 13, 1944	1	Nakajima Ki-49 "Helen" heavy bomber (Saipan, Mariana Islands)
June 19, 1944	5	Judys (1st sortie, Marianas Turkey Shoot, Philippine Sea)
June 19, 1944	2	Zeros (2nd sortie, Guam, Mariana Islands)
June 23, 1944	1 1/2	Zeros destroyed (1 shared credit with Ensign Claude Plant) (Orote Airfield, Guam, Mariana Islands)
September 12, 1944	4	2 Zeros, a Mitsubishi J2M "Jack" fighter and a Mitsubishi Ki-46 "Dinah" reconnaissance aircraft (Cebu Airfield, Philippines)
September 13, 1944	3	A Yokosuka K5Y "Willow" biplane trainer, a Nakajima Ki-43 "Oscar" fighter and a B5N "Kate" torpedo bomber (Negros Island, Philippines)
September 22, 1944	1	Mitsubishi G3M "Nell" bomber/transport (Manila Bay, Philippines)
September 23, 1944	1/2	Mitsubishi F1M2 "Pete" reconnaissance floatplane (credit shared with Ensign R. Nall) (Cebu Island, Philippines)
October 21, 1944	2	A Dinah and a Willow (Tablas Island, Philippines)
October 24, 1944	9	5 Zeros, 2 Mitsubishi A6M3 Hamps and 2 Oscars (Leyte Gulf, Philippines)
November 5, 1944	2	A Aichi D3A "Val" dive bomber and a Zero (Nichols Field, Philippines)
November 11, 1944	1	Oscar (Ormoc Bay, Philippines)
November 14, 1944	1	Oscar (Manila Bay, Philippines)
Total:	34	

=== Post-war ===
McCampbell returned to the United States in March 1945 and served as Chief of Staff to the Commander Fleet Air at NAS Norfolk, Virginia, until January 1947. He then attended the Armed Forces Staff College in Norfolk, and remained as an instructor after graduating.

He served as the Senior Naval Aviation Advisor to the Argentine Navy, stationed at Buenos Aires, Argentina, from 1948 to January 1951, and then as executive officer aboard the USS Franklin D. Roosevelt during the Korean War (although the ship did not participate in combat) from February 1951 to March 1952. He was promoted to captain in July 1952. He served as the Planning Officer on the Staff of Commander Aircraft Atlantic from March 1952 to July 1953. He served as the Commanding Officer, Naval Air Technical Training Center Jacksonville, at NAS Jacksonville, Florida, from July 1953 to July 1954. He then commanded the fleet oiler USS Severn, followed by the aircraft carrier USS Bon Homme Richard.

The well known film actor Wayne Morris had been a guest of his World War II commander, Captain David McCampbell, and was watching aerial maneuvers aboard the aircraft carrier USS Bon Homme Richard in San Francisco Bay when he died on 24 September 1959 having suffered a massive heart attack and was later pronounced dead after being transported to Oakland Naval Hospital in Oakland, California. He was 45.

McCampbell was then assigned to the Joint Chiefs of Staff at the Pentagon from 1960 to September 1962. His final assignment was as Assistant Deputy Chief of Staff for Operations to the Commander in Chief, Continental Air Defense Command, serving from September 1962 until his retirement from the Navy on July 1, 1964.

== Retirement and death ==
McCampbell retired from active duty in 1964. He died in Riviera Beach, Florida, in 1996 and was interred at Arlington National Cemetery.

== Medal of Honor citation ==
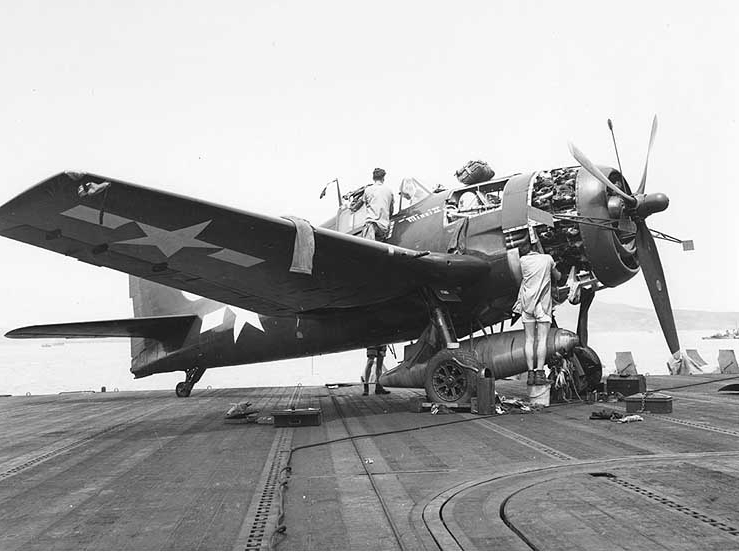
McCampbell's F6F-5 Hellcat fighter on board the aircraft carrier USS Essex 30 July 1944

=== Medal of Honor citation ===
Rank and Organization: Commander, United States Navy, Air Group 15
Place and Date: First and second battles of the Philippine Sea, 19 June 1944
Entered Service at: Florida
Born: January 16, 1910, Bessemer, Alabama

The President of the United States take pleasure in presenting the Medal of Honor to Commander David McCampbell, United States Navy for service as set forth in the following

Citation:

For conspicuous gallantry and intrepidity at the risk of his life above and beyond the call of duty as commander, Air Group Fifteen, during combat against enemy Japanese aerial forces in the First and Second Battles of the Philippine Sea. An inspiring leader, fighting boldly in the face of terrific odds, Commander McCampbell led his fighter planes against a force of eighty Japanese carrier-based aircraft bearing down on our Fleet on June 19, 1944. Striking fiercely in valiant defense of our surface force, he personally destroyed seven hostile planes during this single engagement in which the outnumbering attack force was utterly routed and virtually annihilated. During a major Fleet engagement with the enemy on October 24, Commander McCampbell, assisted by but one plane, intercepted and daringly attacked a formation of sixty hostile land-based craft approaching our forces. Fighting desperately but with superb skill against such overwhelming airpower, he shot down nine Japanese planes and, completely disorganizing the enemy group, forced the remainder to abandon the attack before a single aircraft could reach the Fleet. His great personal valor and indomitable spirit of aggression under extremely perilous combat conditions reflect the highest credit upon Commander McCampbell and the United States Naval Service.

Franklin D. Roosevelt

== Awards and decorations ==
McCampbell's decorations and awards include:

Badge	Naval Aviator Badge		
1st row	Medal of Honor		Navy Cross
2nd row	Silver Star	Legion of Merit with "V" Device	Distinguished Flying Cross with 2 5/16 inch stars
3rd row	Air Medal with 1 5/16 inch star	Joint Service Commendation Medal	Navy Presidential Unit Citation with 1 Service star
4th row	American Defense Service Medal with "A" device	American Campaign Medal	Asiatic-Pacific Campaign Medal with 7 Campaign stars
5th row	European–African–Middle Eastern Campaign Medal with 1 Campaign star	World War II Victory Medal	Navy Occupation Service Medal with 'Asia' clasp
6th row	National Defense Service Medal with 1 Service star	Philippine Liberation Medal with 2 Campaign stars	United States Navy Rifle Marksmanship Medal with Expert device

Civilian Award

Navy Distinguished Public Service Award

== Other honors ==
- In October 1988 the new passenger terminal at the Palm Beach International Airport was named in his honor.
- In 1996, McCampbell was inducted into the National Aviation Hall of Fame in Dayton, Ohio.
- In 1999 he was inducted into the Georgia Aviation Hall of Fame.
- An Arleigh Burke-class AEGIS guided-missile destroyer was christened USS McCampbell (DDG-85) in 2000.
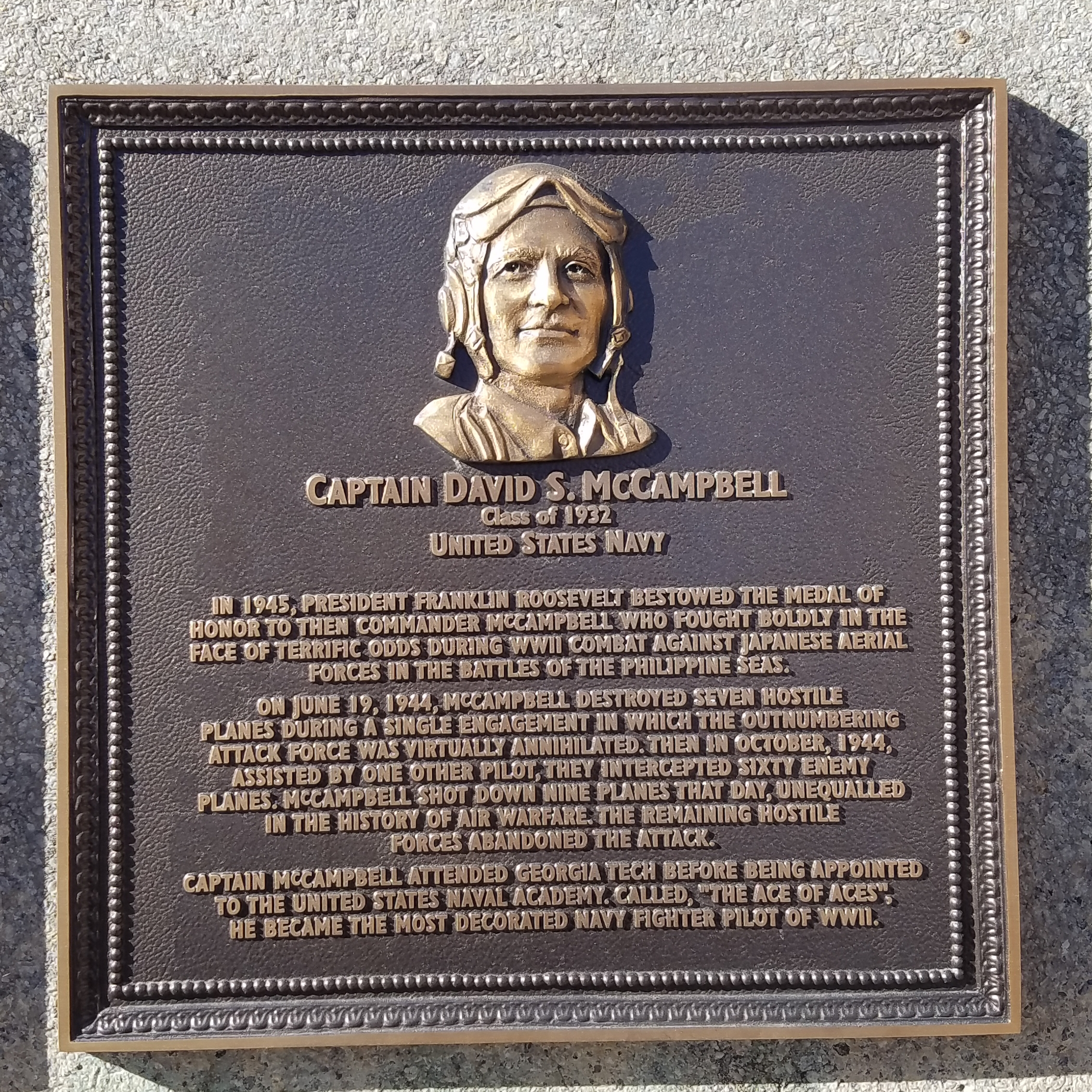
Plaque at Georgia Tech honoring McCampbell

USS McCampbell

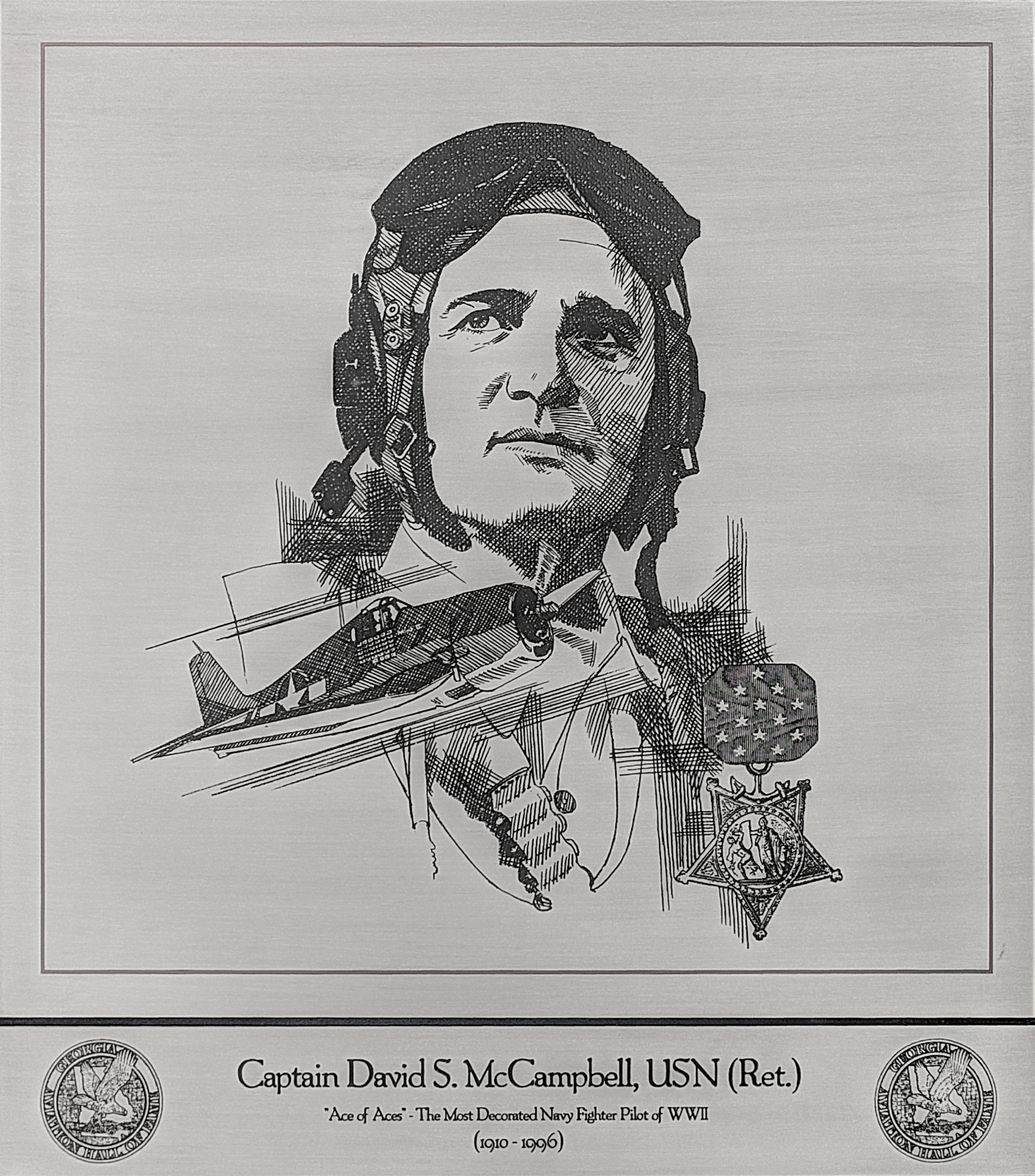
Plaque honoring McCampbell at the Georgia Aviation Hall of Fame

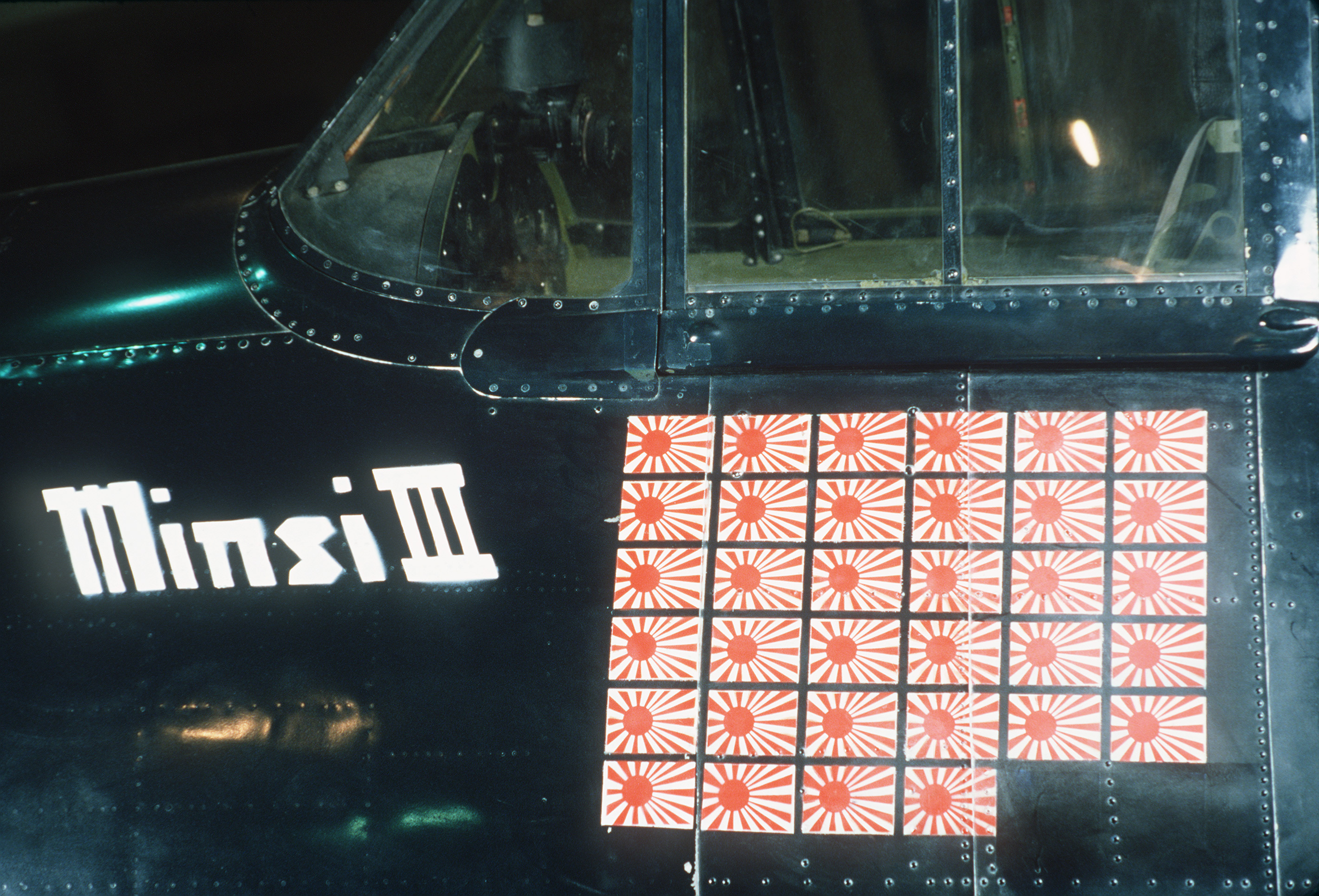
Grumman Hellcat at the National Naval Aviation Museum, painted as a replica of McCampbell's Minsi III, including Japanese flags representing his 34 victories

== See also ==
- List of Medal of Honor recipients for World War II
