= USS Essex (CV-9) =

Essex-class aircraft carrier of the US Navy

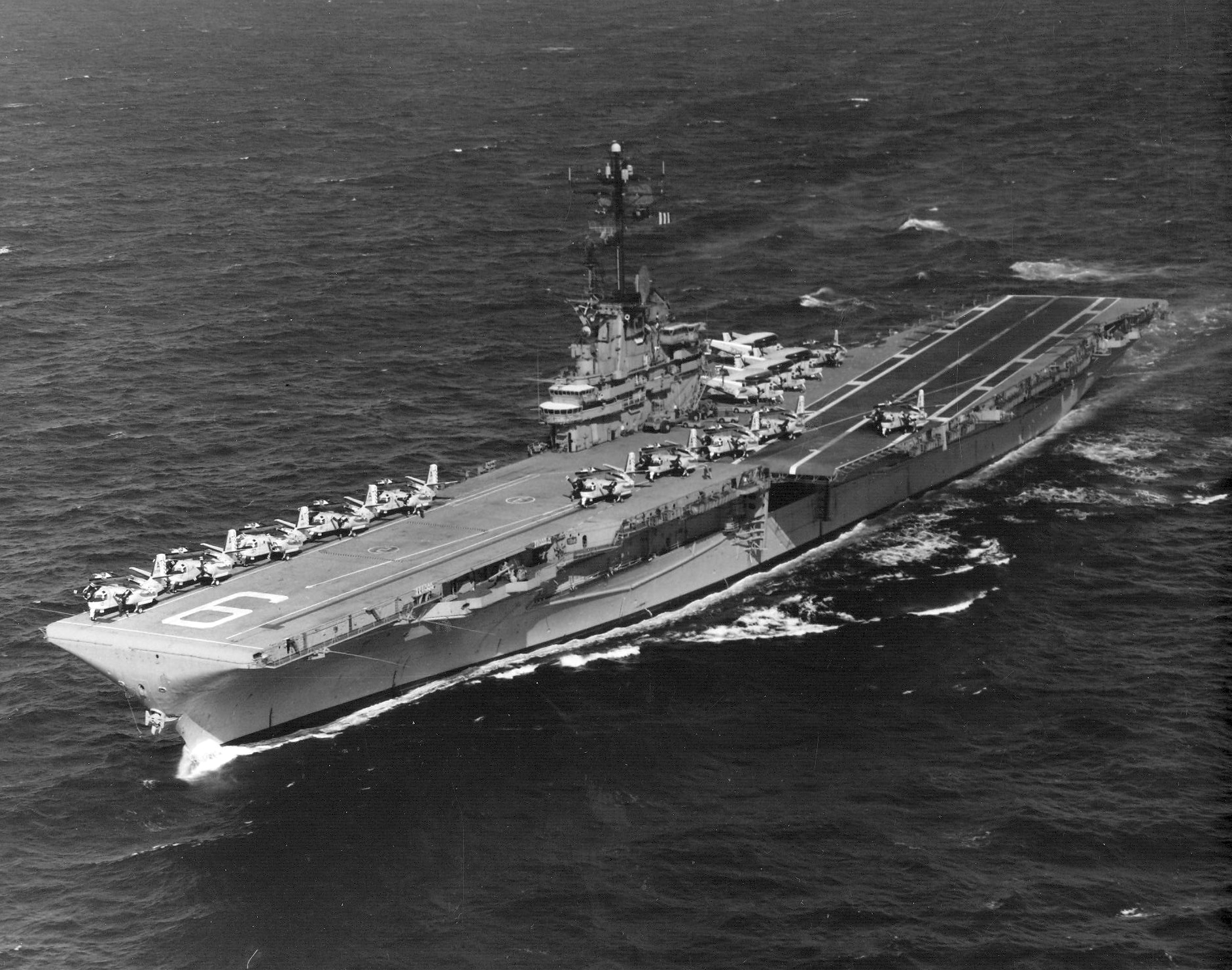
- USS Essex in June 1967

History

United States
- Name: Essex
- Namesake: USS Essex (1799)
- Ordered: 3 July 1940
- Builder: Newport News Shipbuilding
- Laid down: 28 April 1941
- Launched: 31 July 1942
- Commissioned: 31 December 1942
- Decommissioned: 9 January 1947
- Recommissioned: 15 January 1951
- Decommissioned: 30 June 1969
- Reclassified: CVA-9, 1 October 1952; CVS-9, 8 March 1960
- Stricken: 1 June 1973
- Fate: Scrapped, 1973

General characteristics
- Class & type: Essex-class aircraft carrier
- Displacement: 27,100 long tons (27,500 t) (standard); 36,380 long tons (36,960 t) (full load)
- Length: 820 feet (249.9 m) (wl); 872 feet (265.8 m) (o/a)
- Beam: 93 ft (28.3 m)
- Draft: 34 ft 2 in (10.41 m)
- Installed power: 8 × Babcock & Wilcox boilers; 150,000 shp (110,000 kW)
- Propulsion: 4 × geared steam turbines; 4 × screw propellers
- Speed: 33 knots (61 km/h; 38 mph)
- Range: 14,100 nmi (26,100 km; 16,200 mi) at 20 knots (37 km/h; 23 mph)
- Complement: 2,600 officers and enlisted men
- Armament: 12 × 5 in (127 mm) DP guns; 32 × 40 mm (1.6 in) AA guns; 46 × 20 mm (0.8 in) AA guns
- Armor: Waterline belt: 2.5–4 in (64–102 mm); Deck: 1.5 in (38 mm); Hangar deck: 2.5 in (64 mm); Bulkheads: 4 in (102 mm)
- Aircraft carried: 36 × Grumman F4F Wildcat; 36 × Douglas SBD Dauntless; 18 × Grumman TBF Avenger

USS Essex (CV/CVA/CVS-9) was an aircraft carrier and the lead ship of the 24-ship Essex class built for the United States Navy during World War II. She was the fourth US Navy ship to bear the name. Commissioned in December 1942, Essex participated in several campaigns in the Pacific Theater of Operations, earning the Presidential Unit Citation and 13 battle stars. Decommissioned shortly after the war, she was modernized and recommissioned in the early 1950s as an attack carrier (CVA), eventually becoming an antisubmarine aircraft carrier (CVS). In her second career, she served mainly in the Atlantic, playing a role in the Cuban Missile Crisis. She also participated in the Korean War, earning four battle stars and the Navy Unit Commendation. She was the primary recovery carrier for the Apollo 7 space mission.

She was decommissioned for the last time in 1969 and sold by the Defense Reutilization and Marketing Service for scrap on 1 June 1973.

== Construction and commissioning ==
Essex was laid down on 28 April 1941 by Newport News Shipbuilding and Dry Dock Co. After the Pearl Harbor attack, her building contract (along with the same for CV-10 and CV-12) was reworked. After an accelerated construction, she was launched on 31 July 1942, sponsored by Alice Trubee Davison, the wife of the Assistant Secretary of the Navy for Air. She was commissioned on 31 December 1942, with Captain Donald B. Duncan commanding.

== Service history ==
=== World War II ===
Following her accelerated builder's trials and shakedown cruise, Essex moved to the Pacific in May 1943. Departing from Pearl Harbor, she participated with Task Force 16 (TF 16) in carrier operations against Marcus Island on 31 August. That same day, she was designated the flagship of TF 14 and struck Wake Island on 5 and 6 October. On 11 November, she took part in carrier operations during the Rabaul strike, alongside Bunker Hill and USS Independence. She then launched an attack with Task Group 50.3 (TG 50.3) against the Gilbert Islands where she took part in her first amphibious assault during the Battle of Tarawa. After refueling at sea, she cruised as the flagship of TG 50.3 to attack Kwajalein on 4 December. Her second amphibious assault delivered in company with TG 50.3 was against the Marshall Islands on 29 January to 2 February 1944.

Essex, in TG 50.3, now joined with TG 58.1 and TG 58.2 to constitute Task Force 58, the "Fast Carrier Task Force", launched an attack against Truk between 17 and 18 February 1944 during which eight Japanese ships were sunk. While en route to the Mariana Islands to sever Japanese supply lines, the carrier force was detected and subjected to a prolonged aerial attack which it repelled successfully. It then continued with the scheduled attack upon Saipan, Tinian, and Guam on 23 February 1944.

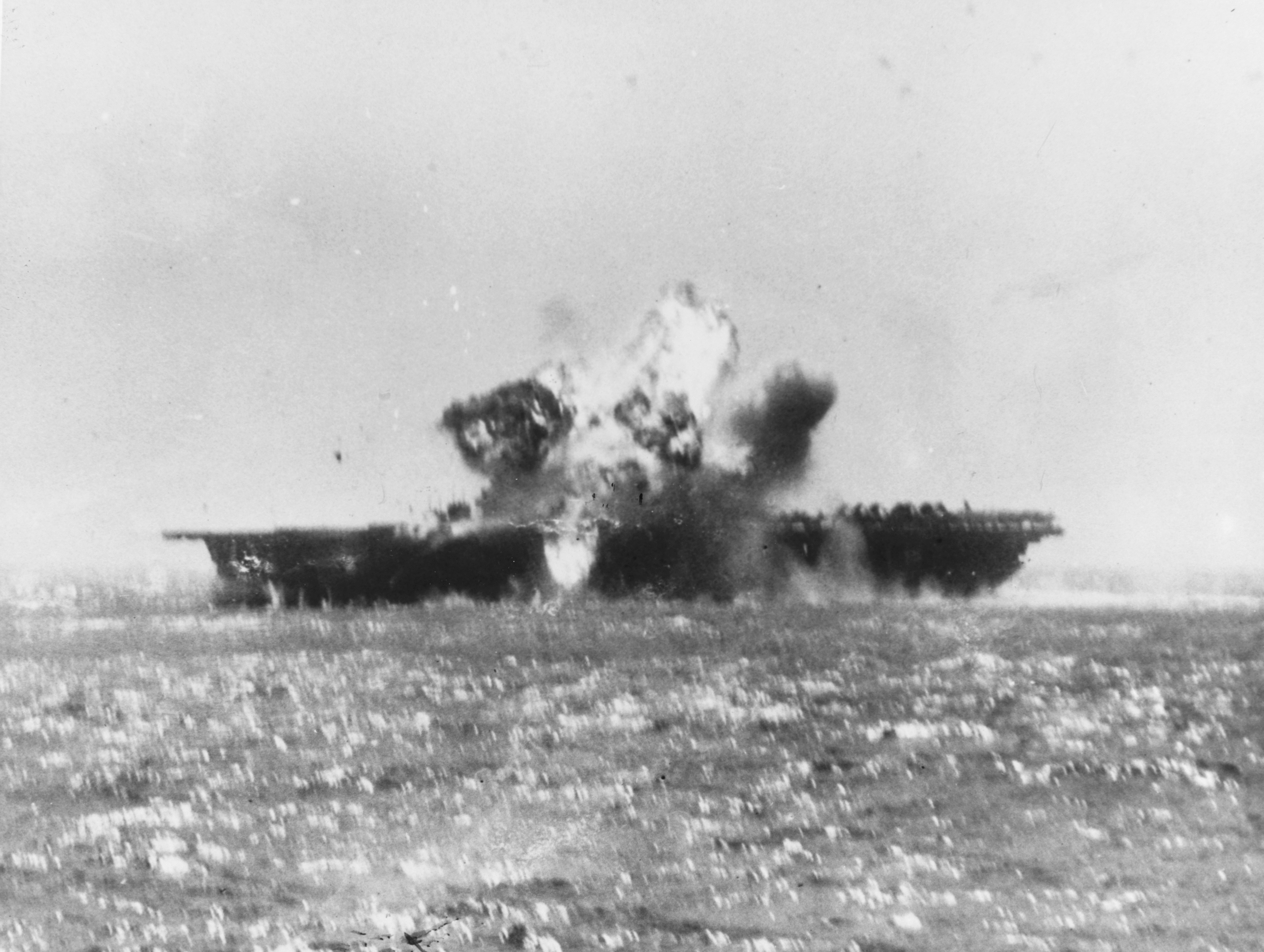
Essex is hit by a kamikaze off the Philippines, 25 November 1944.

After this operation, Essex proceeded to San Francisco for her single wartime overhaul, after which, Essex became the carrier for Air Group 15, the "Fabled Fifteen" commanded by the U.S. Navy's top ace of the war, David McCampbell. She then joined carriers Wasp and San Jacinto in TG 12.1 to strike Marcus Island on 19 to 20 May 1944, and Wake, on 23 May 1944. She deployed with TF 58 to support the occupation of the Marianas on 12 June to 10 August; sortied with TG 38.3 to lead an attack against the Palau Islands on 6 to 8 September, and Mindanao on 9 to 10 September with enemy shipping as the main target, and remained in the area to support landings on Peleliu. On 2 October, she weathered a typhoon and four days later departed with Task Force 38 (TF 38) for the Ryukyus. (Note: TF 38 was actually the same formation as TF 58, the nomenclature being changed to reflect the rotation of command staffs employed by the Navy for efficiency in executing multiple operations; this rotation allowed constant front-line deployment of the ships and their crews while providing operational planning time at better-equipped, rear-area base facilities for the command structure not currently afloat.)

For the remainder of 1944, she continued her frontline action, participating in strikes against Okinawa on 1 October, and Formosa from 1 to 14 October, covering the Leyte landings, taking part in the Battle of Leyte Gulf 24 to 25 October, and continuing the search for enemy fleet units until 30 October, when she returned to Ulithi, Caroline Islands, for replenishment. She resumed the offensive and delivered attacks on Manila and the northern Philippine Islands during November. On 25 November, for the first time, Essex received damage. A kamikaze flown by Lt. Yoshinori Yamaguchi hit the port edge of her flight deck, landing among planes fueled for takeoff, and causing extensive damage, killing 15, and wounding 44.

Following quick repairs, she operated with the task force off Leyte supporting the occupation of Mindoro 14 to 16 December 1944. She rode out Typhoon Cobra and made a special search for survivors afterward. With TG 38.3, she participated in the Lingayen Gulf operations, launched strikes against Formosa, Sakishima, Okinawa, and Luzon. Entering the South China Sea in search of enemy surface forces, the task force pounded shipping and conducted strikes on Formosa, the China coast, Hainan, and Hong Kong. Essex withstood the onslaught of the third typhoon in four months on 20 and 21 January 1945 before striking again at Formosa, Miyako-jima, and Okinawa on 26 and 27 January.

For the remainder of the war, she operated with TF 58, conducting attacks against the Tokyo area on 16 and 17 February. On 25 February 1945, she was deployed to neutralize the enemy's air power before the landings on Iwo Jima and to cripple the aircraft-manufacturing industry. She sent support missions against Iwo Jima and neighboring islands, but from 23 March to 28 May, was employed primarily to support the conquest of Okinawa. In the closing days of the war, Essex took part in the final telling raids against the Japanese home islands on 10 July to 15 August 1945. Following the surrender of Japan, she continued defensive combat air patrols until 3 September, when she was ordered to Bremerton, Washington, for inactivation. She arrived at Puget Sound on 15 September.

=== 1950s ===
On 9 January 1947, she was decommissioned and placed in reserve. Modernization endowed Essex with a new flight deck, and a streamlined island superstructure on 16 January 1951, when she was recommissioned, with Captain A. W. Wheelock commanding. After a brief cruise in Hawaiian waters, she began the first of three tours in Far Eastern waters during the Korean War. She served as flagship for Carrier Division 1 and Task Force 77. She was the first carrier to launch F2H Banshees on combat missions; on 16 September 1951, one of these planes, damaged in combat, crashed into aircraft parked on the forward flight deck, causing an explosion and fire, which killed seven. After repairs at Yokosuka, she returned to frontline action on 3 October to launch strikes up to the Yalu River and provide close air support for U.N. troops. Her two deployments in the Korean War were from August 1951 – March 1952 and July 1952 – January 1953. On 1 December 1953, she started her final tour of the war, sailing in the East China Sea with what official U.S. Navy records describe as the "Peace Patrol".

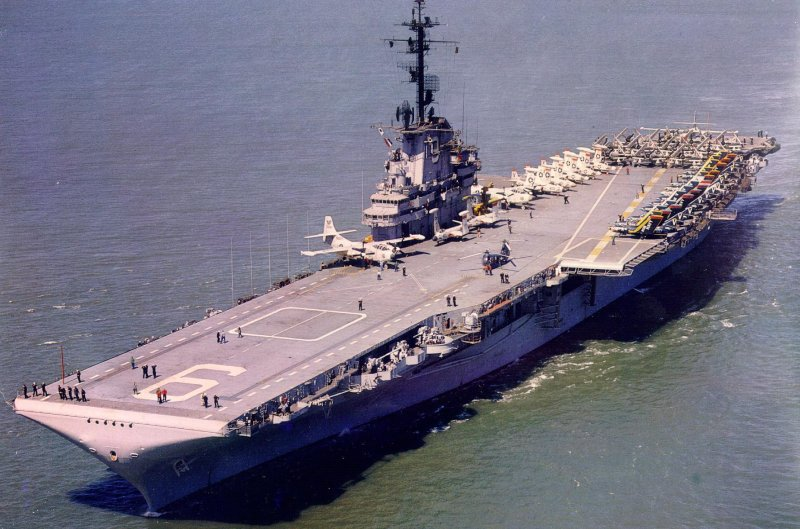
Essex after the SCB-125 modernization, 1956

In the spring of 1954, she was dispatched along with the USS Boxer to the South China Sea, between Indochina and the Philippines, while the United States considered whether to use carrier aircraft to support French troops during the Battle of Dien Bien Phu, a key battle in the First Indochina War. The United States eventually decided to not join the fighting. From November 1954 – June 1955, she engaged in training exercises, operated for three months with the United States Seventh Fleet, assisted in the Tachen Islands evacuation, and engaged in air operations and fleet maneuvers off Okinawa.

In July 1955, Essex entered Puget Sound Naval Shipyard for repairs and extensive alterations. The SCB-125 modernization program included installation of an angled flight deck and an enclosed hurricane bow, as well as relocation of the aft elevator to the starboard deck edge. Modernization completed, she rejoined the Pacific Fleet in March 1956. For the next 14 months, the carrier operated off the West Coast, except for a six-month cruise with the 7th Fleet in the Far East. Ordered to join the Atlantic Fleet for the first time in her long career, she sailed from San Diego on 21 June 1957, rounded Cape Horn, and arrived at Naval Station Mayport on 1 August.

In the fall of 1957, Essex participated as an antisubmarine carrier in the NATO Exercise Strikeback and in February 1958, deployed with the 6th Fleet until May, when she shifted to the eastern Mediterranean. Alerted to the Middle East crisis on 14 July 1958, she sped to support the US landings in Beirut, Lebanon, launching reconnaissance and patrol missions until 20 August. Once again, she was ordered to proceed to Asian waters and transited the Suez Canal to arrive in the Taiwan operational area, where she joined TF 77 in conducting flight operations before rounding the Horn and proceeding back to Mayport. Essex joined with the 2nd Fleet and British ships in Atlantic exercises and with NATO forces in the eastern Mediterranean during the fall of 1959. In December she aided victims of a disastrous flood at Fréjus, France.

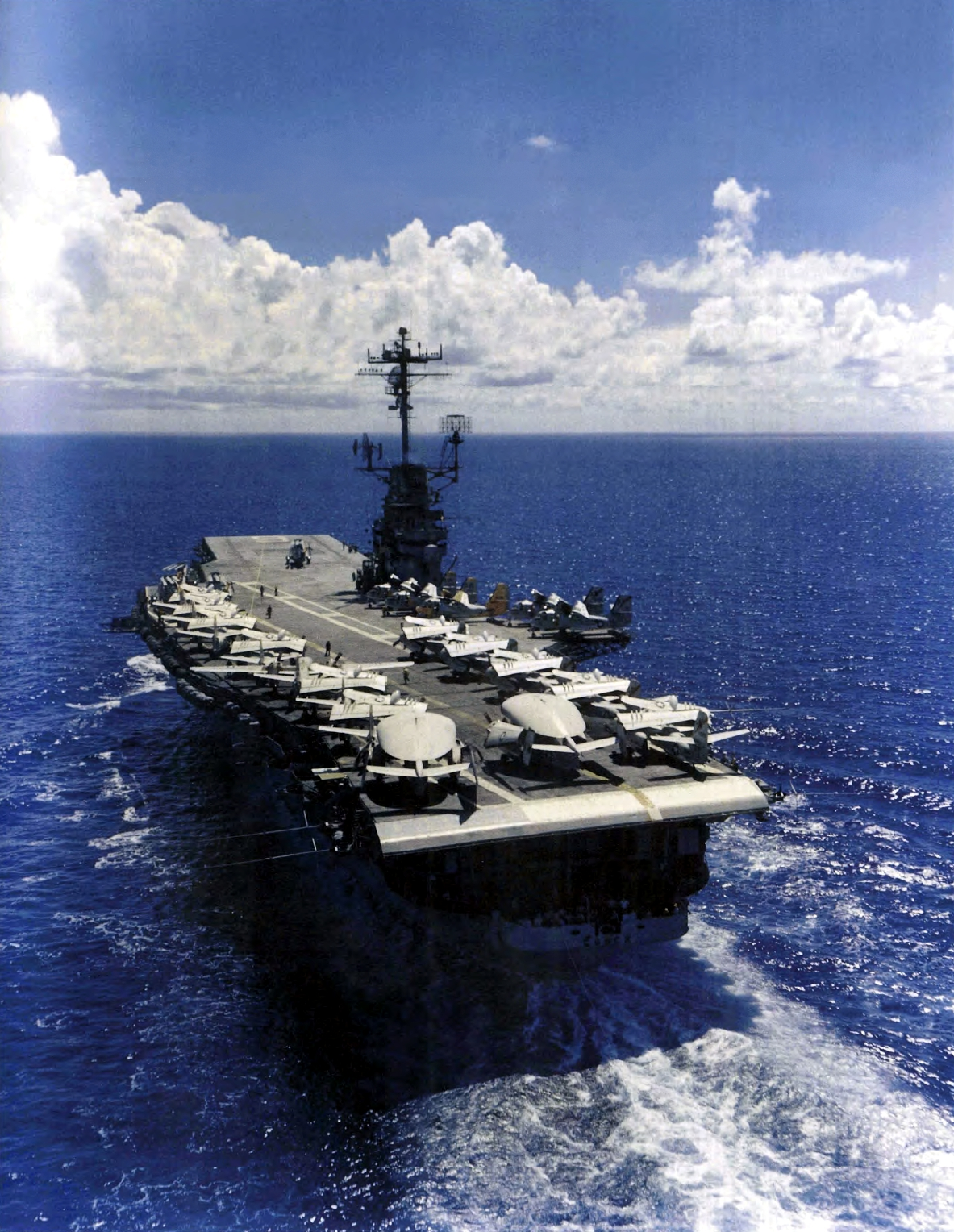
Essex underway in 1962

In the spring of 1960, she was converted into an ASW Support Carrier and was thereafter homeported at Quonset Point, Rhode Island. Since that time, she operated as the flagship of Carrier Division 18 and Antisubmarine Carrier Group Three. She conducted rescue and salvage operations off the New Jersey coast for a downed blimp, cruised with midshipmen, and was deployed on NATO and CENTO exercises that took her through the Suez Canal into the Indian Ocean. Her ports of call included Karachi and the British Crown Colony of Aden. In November, she joined the French navy in Operation Jet Stream. On 7 November 1960, the Soviet research vessel Vityaz was reported by TASS to have been buzzed in the Arabian Sea by a Grumman S-2F Tracker from Essex. The United States Navy denied that the aircraft was buzzing the ship, claiming it was merely establishing her identity.

=== Bay of Pigs and Cuban Missile Crisis ===
In April 1961, Essex steamed out of Quonset Point on a two-week "routine training" cruise, purportedly to support the carrier qualification of a squadron of Navy pilots. Twelve A4D Skyhawks from VA-34 stationed at NAS Cecil Field, Florida, flew aboard. VS-34 aircraft had been removed to make room for VA-34's aircraft. VA-34's support enlisted crew flew aboard in C1A COD aircraft. The A4D-2 were armed with two 20 mm Mk-12 cannons loaded with "service" ammo and one LAU-3a 19 shot 2.75 FFAR pod with "antitank" warheads mounted on the centerline ejector rack, Station 3. After several days at sea, all their identifying markings were crudely obscured with flat gray paint. They began flying two aircraft missions by day only. Not generally known to the Essex crew, they had been tasked to provide air support to CIA-sponsored bombers during the ill-fated Bay of Pigs Invasion. Cuba's leader Castro knew the Essex was off the Cuban coast, but the US Navy denied that claim. The naval aviation part of the mission was aborted by President John F. Kennedy at the last moment and the Essex crew was sworn to secrecy. Returning home and while at sea, VA-34's aircraft were hastily repainted "national stars and bars" by all available enlisted personnel, then flew off and landed at NAS Jacksonville, and underwent professional repainting at the NARF Naval Aviation Rework facility. The planes then flew a few miles over to her home base at NAS Cecil Field. The entire VA-34 crew was sworn to secrecy. In 1967–68, VA-34's crew was awarded the Navy and Marine Expeditionary medals.

Later in 1961, Essex completed a "People to People" cruise to Northern Europe with ports of call in Rotterdam, Hamburg, and Greenock. During the Hamburg visit, over one million visitors toured Essex. During her departure, Essex almost ran aground in the shallow Elbe River. On her return voyage to the United States, she ran into a severe North Atlantic storm (January 1962) and suffered major structural damage. In early 1962, she went into dry dock in the Brooklyn Navy Yard for a major overhaul.

Essex had just finished her six-month-long overhaul and was at Guantanamo Bay Naval Base for sea trials when President Kennedy placed a naval "quarantine" on Cuba in October 1962, in response to the discovered presence of Soviet missiles in that country. The word "quarantine" was used rather than "blockade" for reasons of international law, Kennedy reasoned that a blockade would be an act of war, and war had not been declared between the U.S. and Cuba. Essex spent over a month in the Caribbean as one of the US Navy ships enforcing this "quarantine", returning home just before Thanksgiving.

=== Later career ===
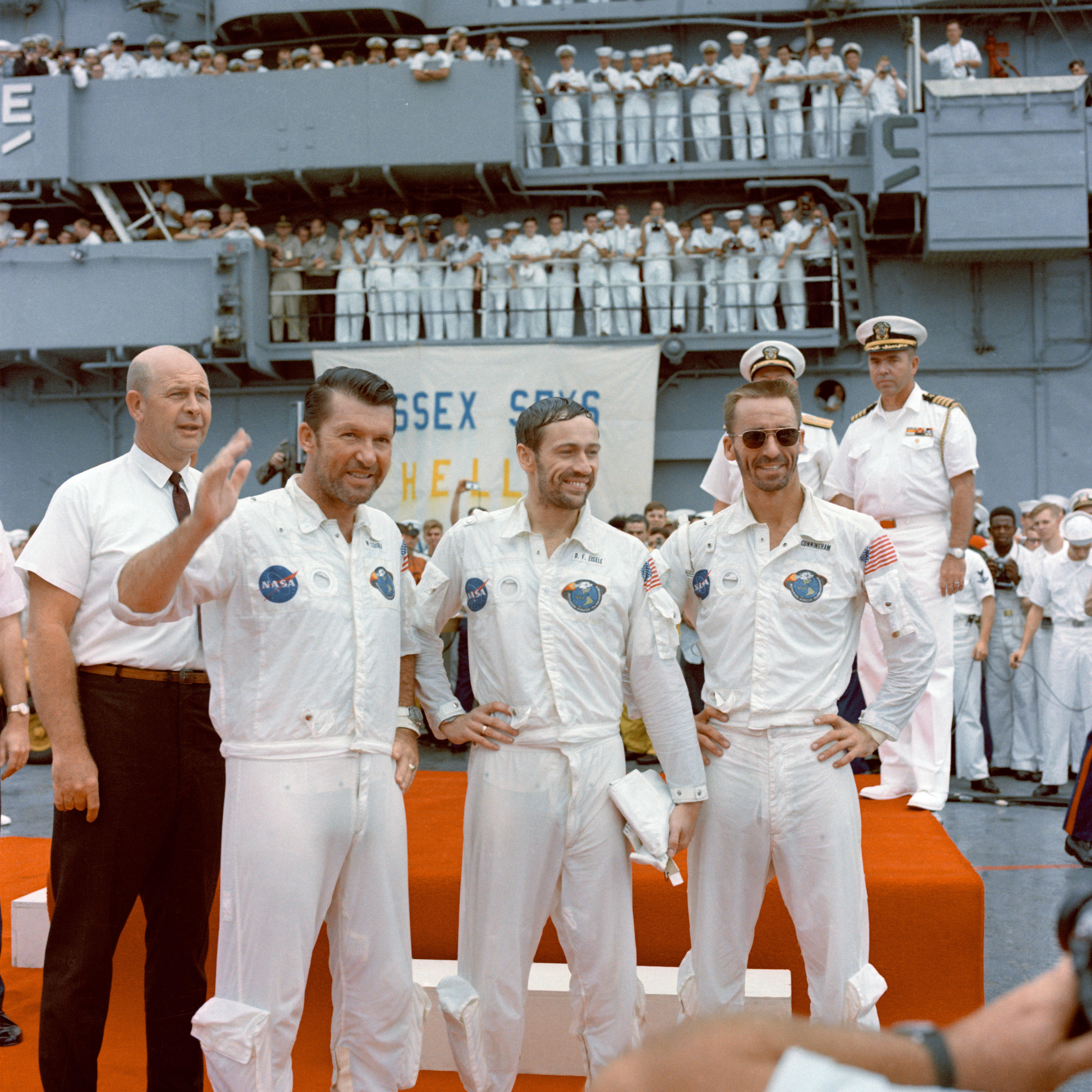
The Apollo 7 crew is welcomed aboard Essex, 1968.

While conducting replenishment exercises with NATO forces on 10 November 1966, Essex collided with the submerged submarine Nautilus. The submarine sustained extensive sail damage, returning to port unassisted. Aboard Essex, the hull was opened, and the ship's speed indicator equipment was destroyed, but the carrier was still able to make port unassisted. Essex subsequently reported to the Boston Naval Shipyard for an extensive overhaul and hull repairs.

On 25 May 1968, Essex was underway in the Norwegian Sea when she was buzzed four times by a Soviet Tupolev Tu-16 heavy bomber. On the fourth pass, the plane's wing clipped the surface of the sea, and the aircraft disintegrated. The Essex launched rescue helicopters, but none of the crew on board survived. Three bodies and wreckage were recovered and transferred to a Russian destroyer via life boat.

Essex was scheduled to be the prime recovery carrier for the ill-fated Apollo 1 space mission. She was to pick up Apollo 1 astronauts north of Puerto Rico on 7 March 1967 after a 14-day spaceflight. However, the mission did not take place because on 27 January 1967, the Apollo 1's crew was killed by a flash fire in their spacecraft on LC-34 at the Cape Canaveral Air Force Station, Florida. Essex was the prime recovery carrier for the Apollo 7 mission. She recovered the Apollo 7 crew on 22 October 1968 after a splashdown north of Puerto Rico. Essex was the main vessel on which future Apollo 11 astronaut Neil Armstrong served during the Korean War.

Essex was decommissioned on 30 June 1969 at Boston Navy Yard. She was struck from the Naval Vessel Register on 1 June 1973 and sold by the Defense Reutilization and Marketing Service (DRMS) for scrapping on 1 June 1975. Essex was scrapped at Kearny, New Jersey.

== Awards ==

Navy Unit Commendation	Meritorious Unit Commendation	Navy Expeditionary Medal (thrice)
China Service Medal	American Campaign Medal	Asiatic-Pacific Campaign Medal (13 battle stars)
World War II Victory Medal	Navy Occupation Service Medal (with Asia clasp)	National Defense Service Medal (twice)
Korean Service Medal (4 battle stars)	Armed Forces Expeditionary Medal (thrice)	Philippine Presidential Unit Citation
Philippine Liberation Medal (2 battle stars)	United Nations Korean Medal	Republic of Korea War Service Medal (retroactive)

== Gallery ==
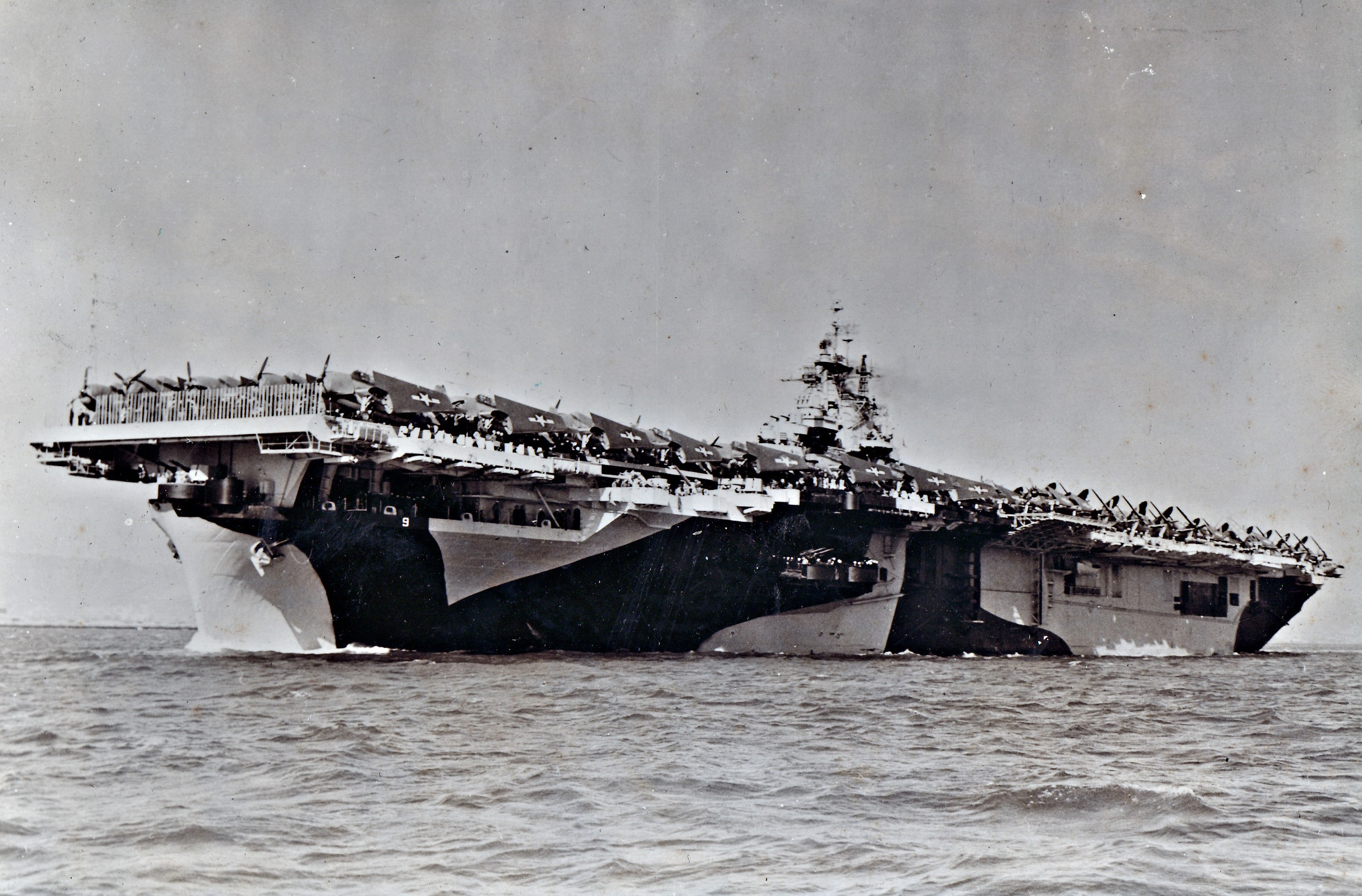
USS Essex on 15 April 1944

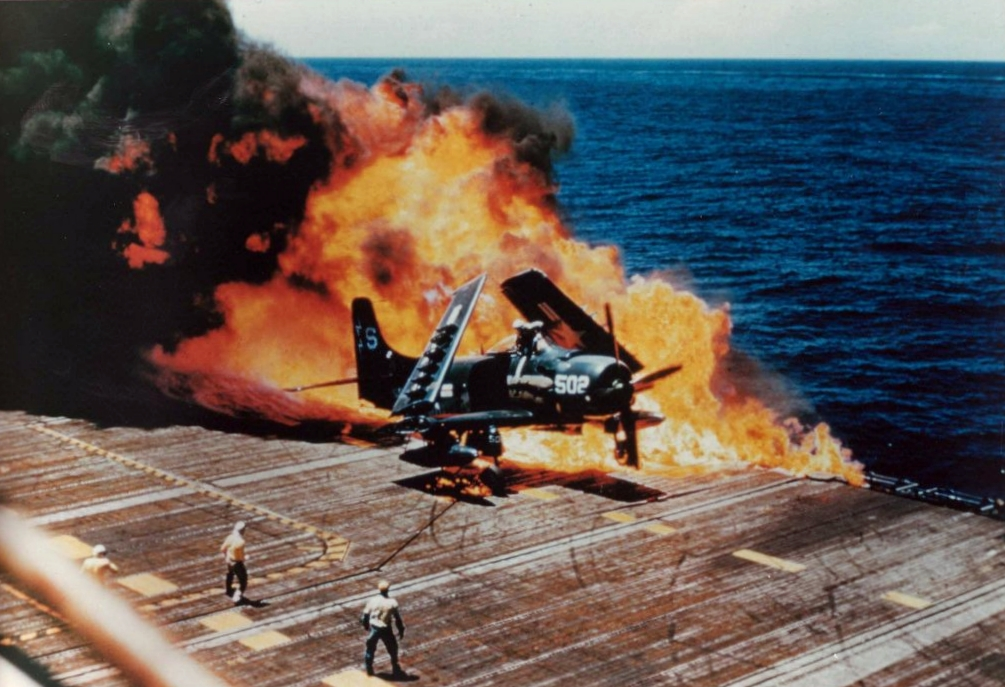
Burning AD-4 aboard USS Essex in 1954

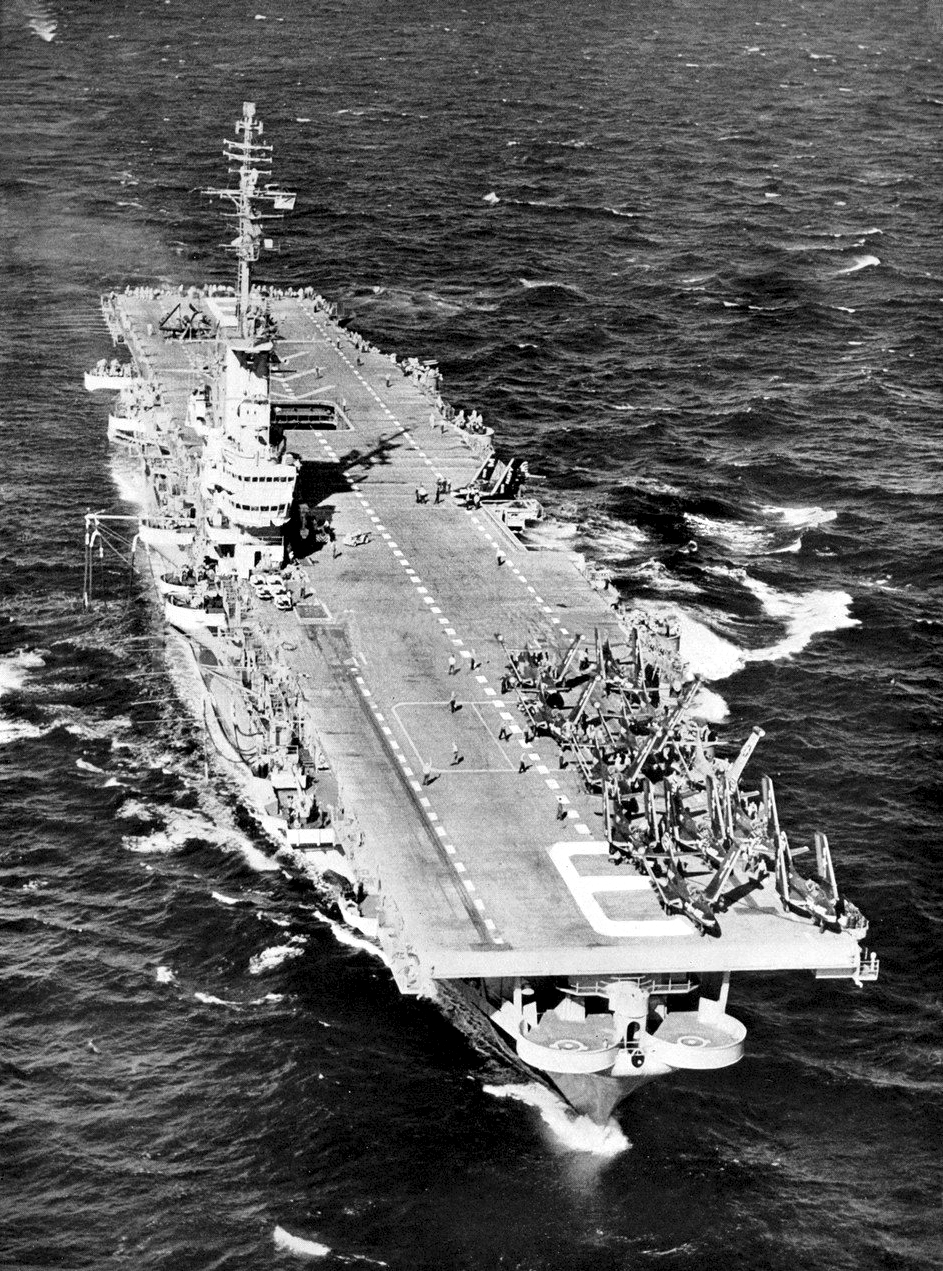
USS Essex in 1955

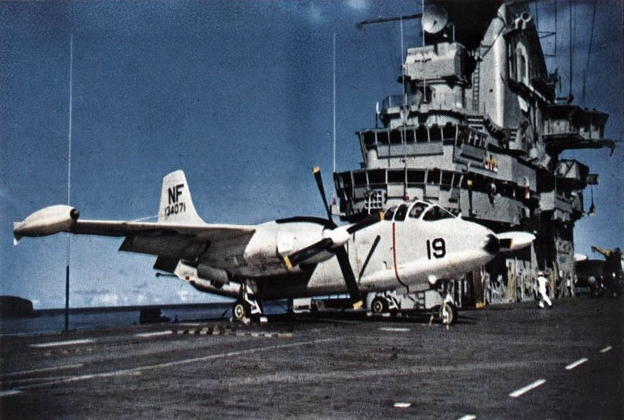
AJ-2 aboard USS Essex in 1956

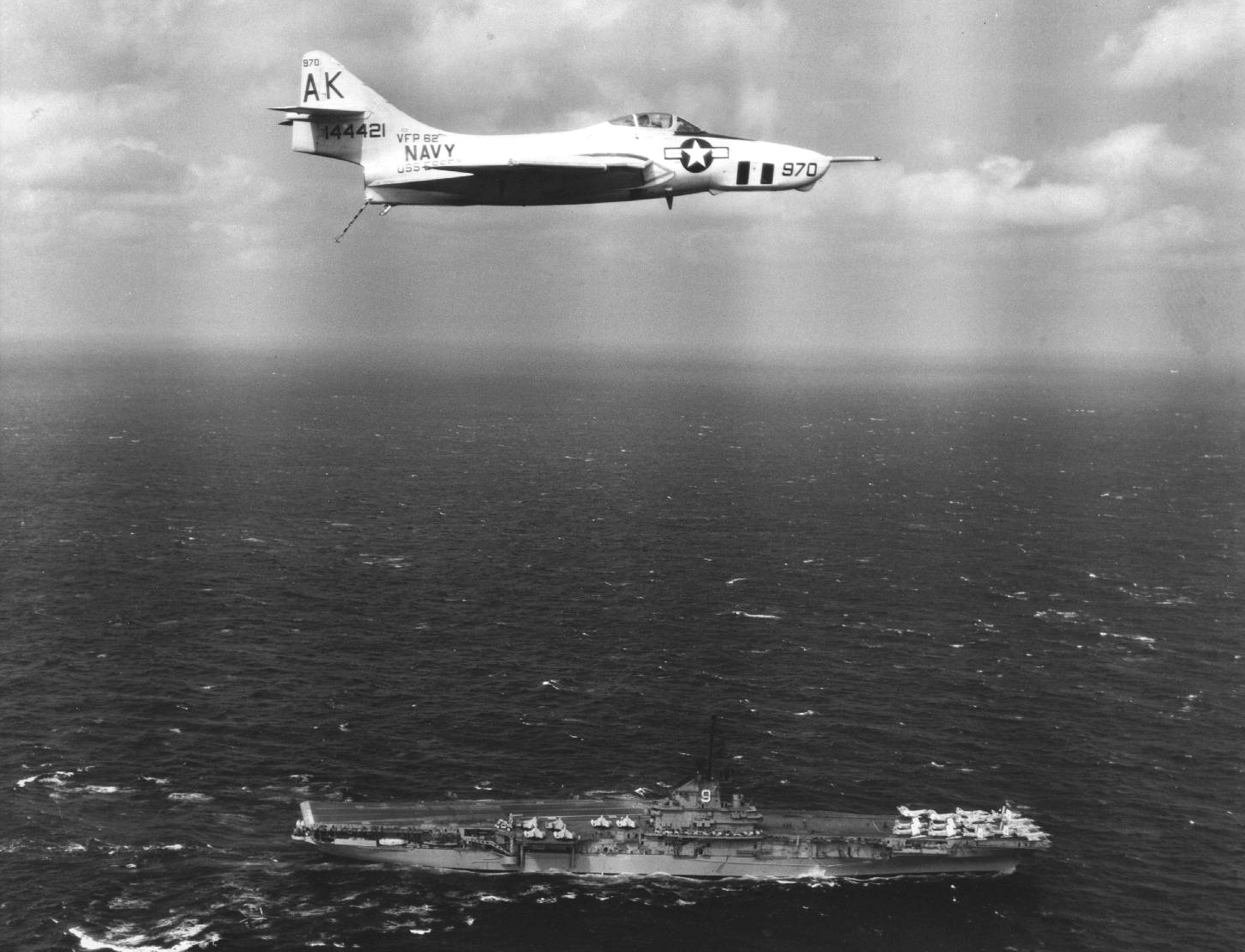
F9F-8P over USS Essex in 1960
