= Operation Formation Star =

US military operation in 1968 off North Korea

- Part of the Cold War, Korean Conflict, Pueblo Incident
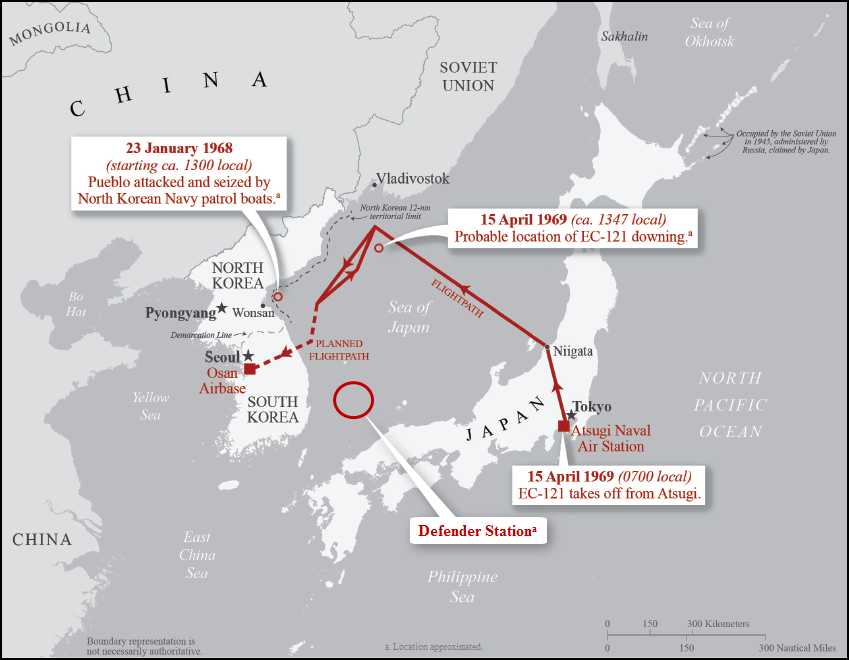
- Defender Station
- Type: Contingency operations (Note: For more information, see Contingency operations in this article.)
- Location: Defender Station: Sea of Japan off the east coast of North Korea up to the 36th parallel North
- Planned by: U.S. Seventh Fleet
- Commanded by: Rear Admiral Horace H. Epes, Jr. Commander Task Force 71 (CTF-71)
- Target: North Korea
- Objective: Contingency operations
- Date: January 25, 1968 to March 22, 1968
- Executed by: Task Force 71 (TF-71)
- Outcome: Show of force

Operation Formation Star was the code name for the emergency re-deployment of U.S. Seventh Fleet warships to the Sea of Japan off the eastern coast of North Korea following that country's seizure of the USS Pueblo (AGER-2) in international waters on 23 January 1968. (Note: According to the USS Coral Sea 1968 command history, FORMATION STAR was the code name for cold weather training operations conducted in the Sea of Japan.)

This surge deployment was the largest build-up of U.S. naval forces around the Korean Peninsula since the end of the Korean War. Still, Operation Formation Star placed considerable strain on the Seventh Fleet's support for the Vietnam War during the Tet Offensive, particularly its aircraft carrier operations at Yankee Station in the Gulf of Tonkin.

Operation Formation Star was executed in conjunction with Operation Combat Fox, a surge deployment of additional land-based combat aircraft squadrons to the U.S. Fifth Air Force in the Far East. Additionally, the Pueblo Crisis saw a limited presidential-authorized call-up of U.S.-based units of the Naval Reserve, Air Force Reserve, and Air National Guard to active duty, the first such call-up since the Berlin Crisis of 1961.

Although a wide range of military options were considered, the Johnson Administration elected to resolve the Pueblo crisis diplomatically, with Operation Formation Star helping to provide a "measured show of force" during the Pueblo crisis.

== Background ==
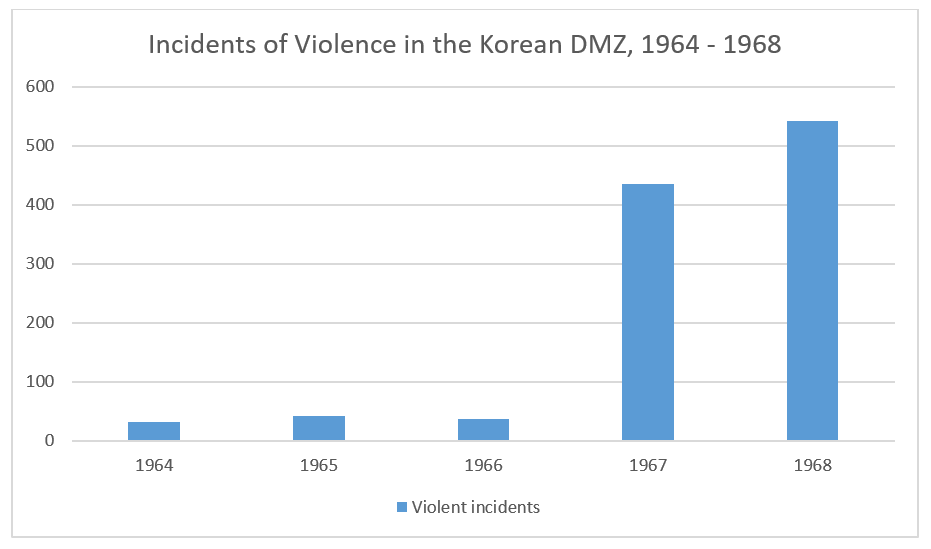
Major incidents — Korean DMZ, 1964–1968

=== Tensions along the Korean demilitarized zone (DMZ) ===
Also referred to as the Second Korean War, the Korean DMZ Conflict was a series of low-level armed clashes between North Korean forces and the forces of South Korea and the United States, largely occurring between 1966 and 1969 at the Korean DMZ. The number of incidents along the DMZ jumped from 37 in 1966 to 435 in 1967, with a combined 1967 total of 371 fatalities involving North Korea, South Korea, and United Nations forces while there were no fatalities in 1966 (see chart). (Note: The final total for 1968 was 542; and for 1969, it was 99 (not shown).) Also, during 1967, there were two sabotage attempts to disrupt South Korea railroad operations, the first such attempts since the end of the Korean War. Additionally, in 1967, a South Korean patrol vessel was sunk by North Korea shore batteries over a fishing dispute, with thirty-nine of the 79-man crew killed.

Finally, in the most overt incident to date, North Korean commandos from Unit 124 unsuccessfully attempted to assassinate the South Korea president Park Chung Hee at the presidential residence Blue House in Seoul, South Korea, on 21 January 1968.

=== Operation Clickbeetle ===
Operation Clickbeetle was the code-name for United States electronic and radio intelligence-gathering operations by small converted coastal cargo ships that operated close to potential enemies' coastline in international waters. The first vessel in this program was Banner and the second was the Pueblo. Beginning in 1965, the Banner completed fifteen intelligence missions involving the Soviet Union and China, with only three missions that also included North Korea. While both China and the Soviet Union in particular challenged Banner's presence off their coasts, the North Koreans virtually ignored the U.S. vessel. Banner and Pueblo were under the direct operational control of the Commander, Naval Forces Japan Rear Admiral Frank L. Johnson through the Task Force 96 command staff.

== Operational summary ==
On 11 January 1968, USS Pueblo left Sasebo, Japan, and headed northward through the Tsushima Strait into the Sea of Japan. Pueblo's specific orders were to intercept and conduct surveillance of Soviet Pacific Fleet activity in the Tsushima Strait and to gather signal and electronic intelligence from North Korea. To maintain a low profile, no naval escort was provided nor were any land-based interceptor jets on stand-by alert for Pueblo's mission. After an uneventful mission to date, Pueblo was observed by a North Korea sub-chaser on 21 January 1968 in international waters off Wonsan. On 23 January 1968, the Pueblo was shadowed by two North Korea fishing trawlers before being intercepted and boarded by a North Korean SO1 class submarine chaser and three P 4-class torpedo boats, all outside North Korea's territorial waters.

1968 USS Pueblo Incident
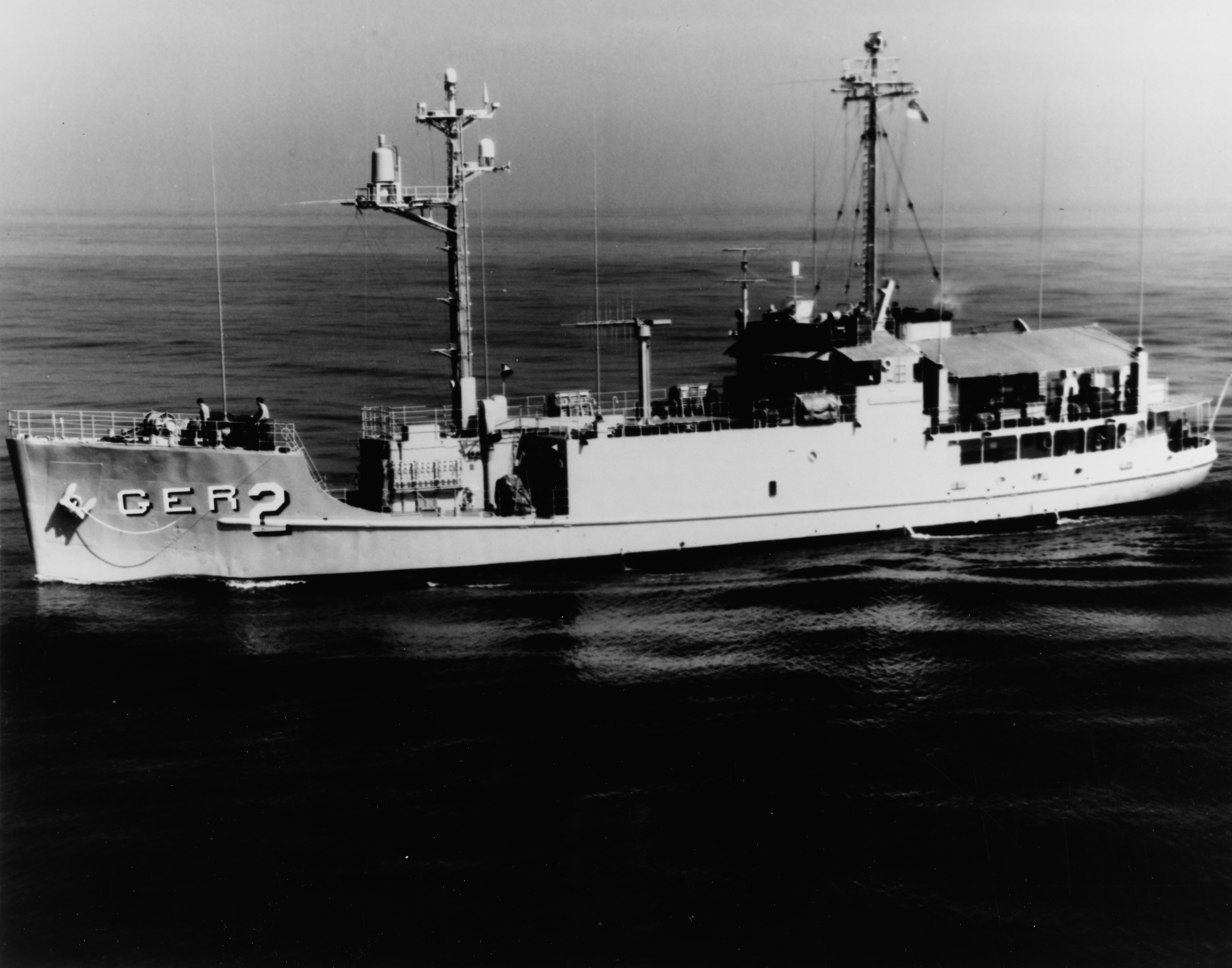
USS Pueblo (AGER-2), 1967

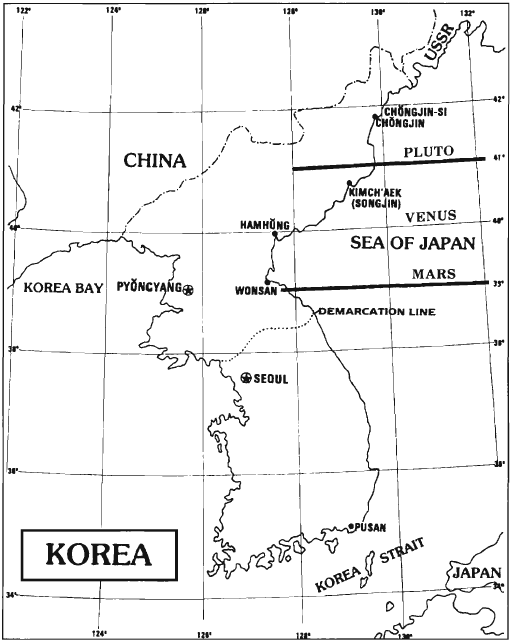
USS Pueblo operating area, 1968

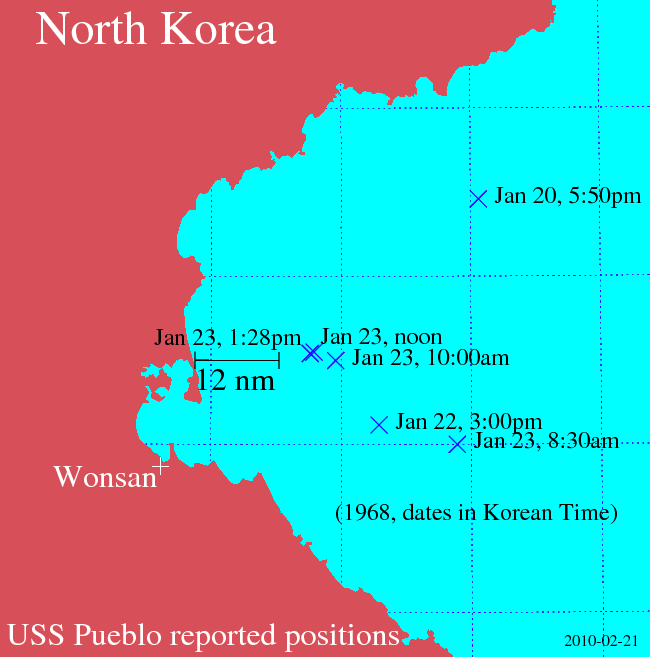
USS Pueblo positions (January 20–23, 1968)

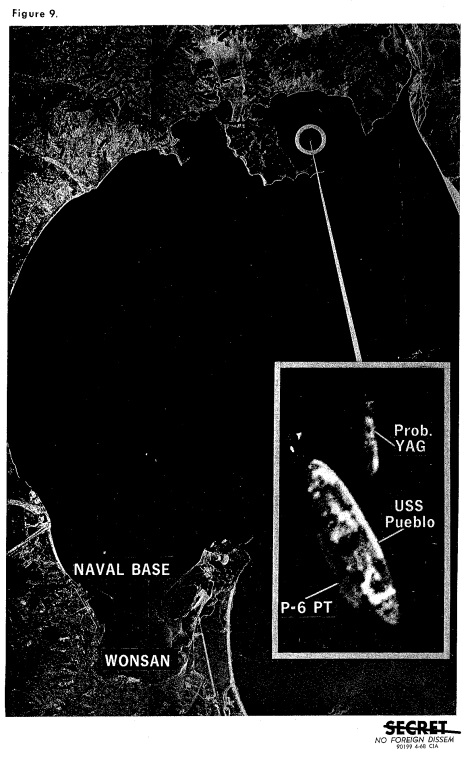
Wonsan harbor with detail (January 25, 1968).

=== Initial response ===
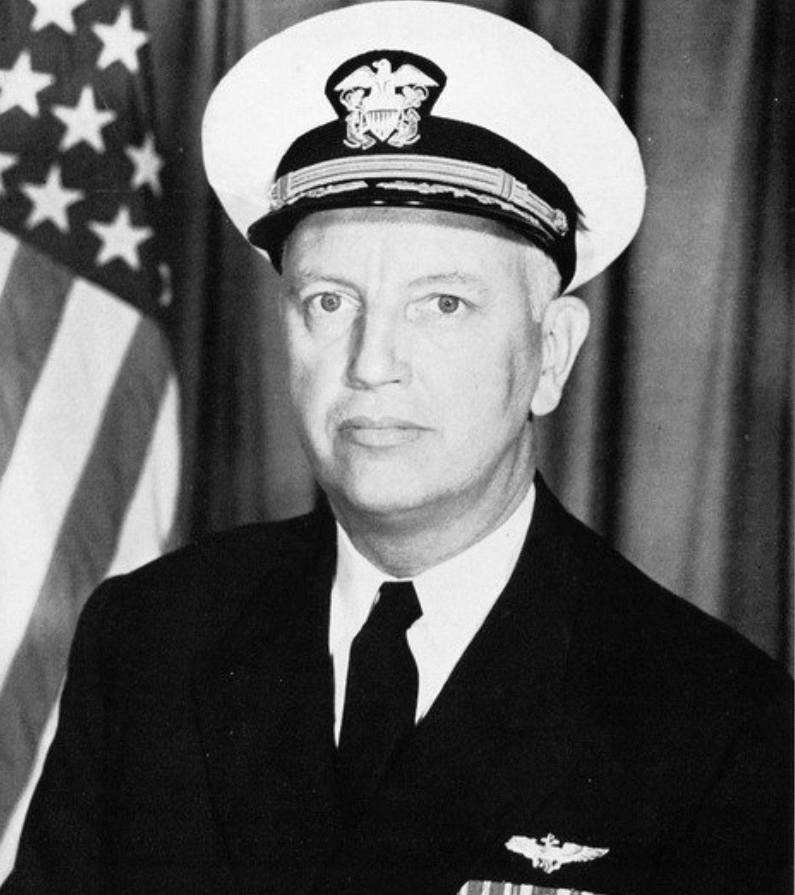
Rear Admiral Horace H. Epes, Jr., USN

On the day of the Pueblo's seizure, 23 January 1968, the closest U.S. naval force was Task Group 77.5 under the command of Rear Admiral Horace H. Epes, Jr. (pictured), (Note: Admiral Epes was also Commander Carrier Division 1 (ComCarDiv1).) consisting of the nuclear-powered attack aircraft carrier Enterprise, the nuclear-powered guided-missile frigate Truxtun, and the guided-missile frigate Halsey. At the time of the initial alert, the task group was steaming in the East China Sea en route to Yankee Station off North Vietnam; it was approximately 550 nautical miles (1,020 km; 630 mi) from the last reported position of the Pueblo or 470 nautical miles (870 km; 540 mi) from Wonsan, the nearest North Korean seaport to Pueblo. Now re-designated Task Group 70.6, the Enterprise task group was ordered to proceed "at best speed" to the southern entrance of the Tsushima Strait. Also, the Pueblo's sister-ship, Banner, was ordered to suspend its intelligence-gathering mission and return to Yokosuka, Japan, immediately.

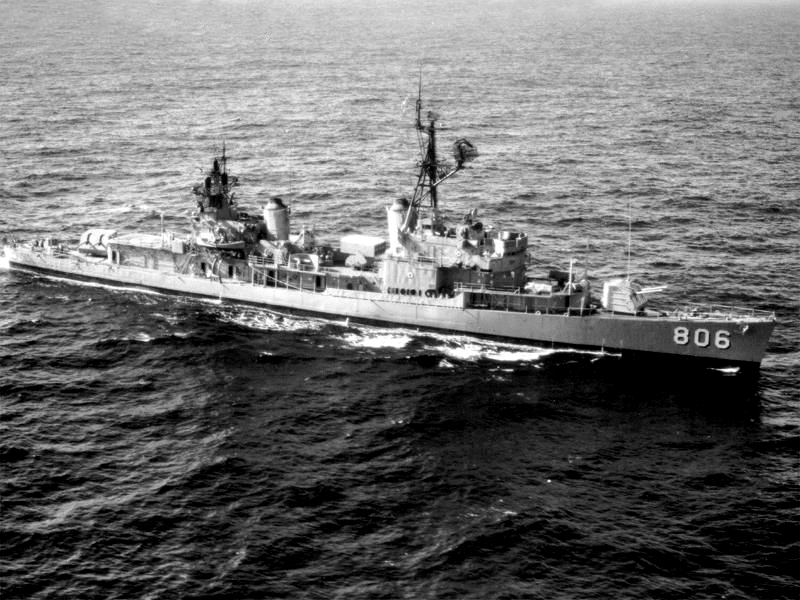
USS Higbee (DD-806)

A number of factors prevented an immediate response from the Enterprise's embarked Carrier Air Wing Nine of 85 aircraft. (Note: Carrier Air Wing Nine (CVW-9) consisted of 26 F-4 Phantom II jet fighters, 26 A-4 Skyhawk attack aircraft, six RA-5 recon aircraft, 15 A-6 Intruders all-weather attack bombers, five A-3 Skywarrior ELINT aircraft, four E-2 Hawkeye AEW aircraft, and three SH-2 Seasprite helicopters.) The air wing's aircraft had sustained damage from a recent typhoon and those remaining 35 operational strike aircraft had to be re-spotted on the flight deck and armed with air-to-surface ordnance. Additionally, the ship could not stage replacement aircraft through Japan due to the status of forces agreement that prohibited the combat use of U.S. military aircraft re-deployed from a neutral nation. Another factor was that Wonsan was protected by 14 anti-aircraft batteries, two surface-to-air missile sites, and up to 75 MiG fighters.

Later on 23 January 1968, CINCPAC Admiral Ulysses S. Grant Sharp, Jr., requested authorization from the U.S. Joint Chiefs of Staff for Task Group 70.6 to carry out photographic reconnaissance of Wonsan to determine the location of the Pueblo. Upon hearing about the seizure of the Pueblo, Admiral John J. Hyland, Jr., recognized the possibility of sending a warship into Wonsan harbor to board and recapture the Pueblo. Accordingly, Hyland directed his U.S. Pacific Fleet headquarters staff to order the U.S. Seventh Fleet to divert a destroyer and "prepare to engage in operations that may include towing Pueblo and/or retrieval of Pueblo crew/provide air cover as appropriate." Vice Admiral William F. Bringle ordered his Seventh Fleet staff to deploy the destroyer Higbee (pictured) to Wonsan as a contingency for such an operation, with a second destroyer to be sent as a back-up. Additionally, on that same date, Lieutenant General Seth J. McKee, of the Fifth Air Force ordered a strike force of twelve F-105 fighter-bombers to Osan Air Base in South Korea with orders to sink the Pueblo in Wonsan harbor. (Note: The strike force was ordered to stand down three days later. See Cheevers. Act of War, p. 129.)

Early on 24 January 1968, the U.S. Pacific Fleet headquarters ordered Task Group 70.6 to remain below the 36th parallel North (Defender Station) and take "no overt action until further informed." Subsequent orders directed the Enterprise task group to the Korea Strait, and to gain additional sea room, the task group temporarily withdrew to the East China Sea. Land-based anti-submarine patrols in support of Task Group 70.6 were limited to a two-plane barrier patrol. Additionally, all signal intelligence-gathering flights over the Yellow Sea and the Sea of Japan were temporarily suspended until further notice. Finally, the Higbee was recalled from the Wonsan area.

On the evening of 25 January 1968, a high-altitude A-12 reconnaissance aircraft overflew Wonsan harbor and confirmed that the Pueblo was anchored there and surrounded by North Korean naval vessels (pictured above).

=== Crisis management ===
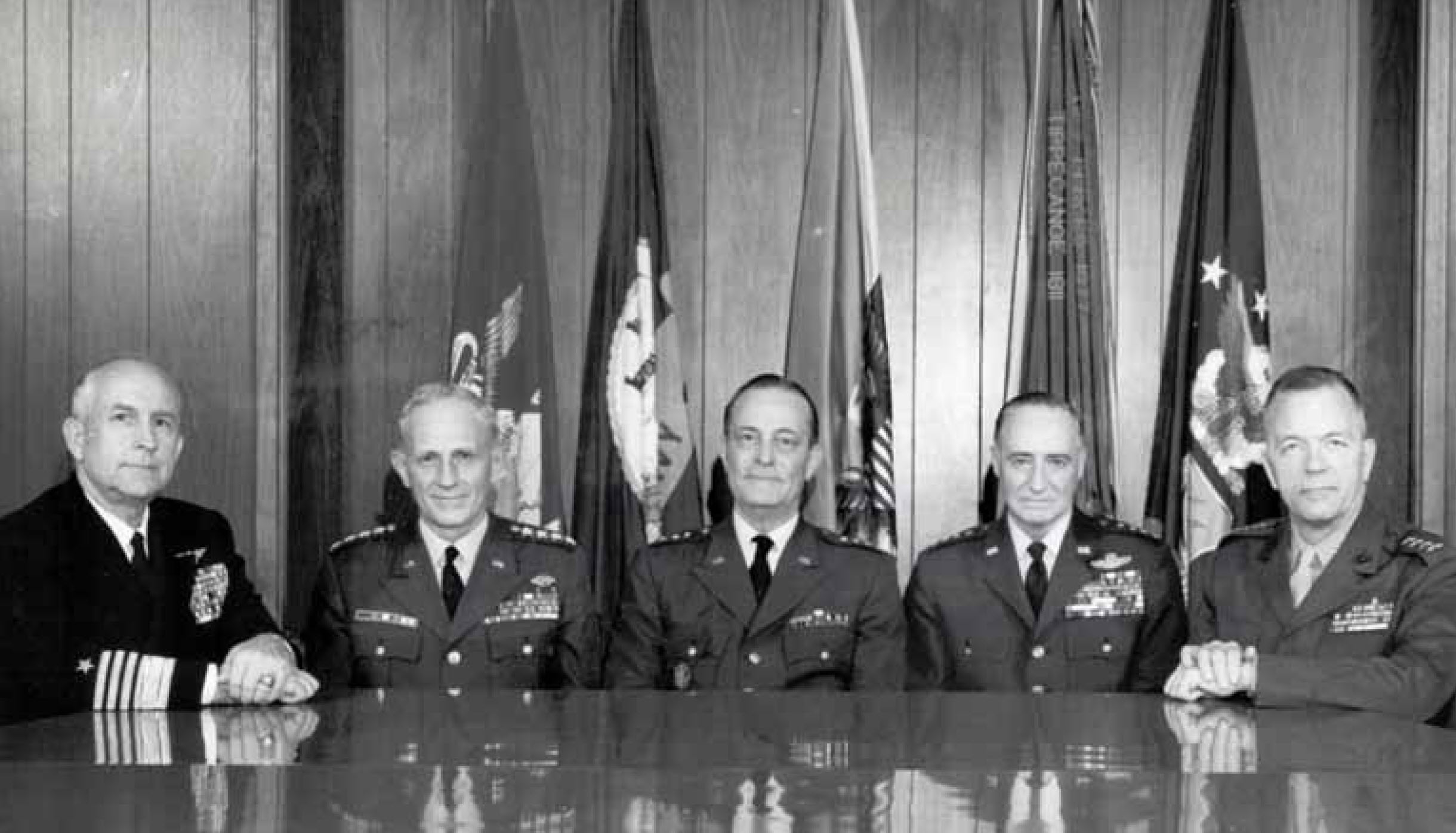
U.S. Joint Chiefs of Staff (Note: The Joint Chiefs of Staff in session, March 1968. Left to right: Admiral Thomas H. Moorer, Chief of Naval Operations, U.S. Navy; General Harold K. Johnson, Chief of Staff, United States Army (USA); General Earle G. Wheeler, USA, Chairman, Joint Chiefs of Staff; General John P. McConnell, Chief of Staff, United States Air Force; and General Leonard F. Chapman, Jr., Commandant, United States Marine Corps.)

The U.S. Pacific Command and U.S. Pacific Fleet planning staffs offered a number of military options in response to the Pueblo crisis. These options were forwarded to the U.S. Joint Chiefs of Staff and the rest of the National Command Authority apparatus while the U.S. Seventh Fleet and U.S. Fifth Air Force command staffs developed contingency plans.

On Wednesday morning, 24 January 1968, Rear Admiral William McClendon, the deputy director for Operations (J-3) on the Joint Staff, reported back to the Joint Chiefs of Staff (pictured) about the disposition and availability of military forces in the vicinity fn the Korean peninsula, as well as offering the following four recommendations:

1. Demand the return of the Pueblo and its crew via U.N.-DPRK talks at Panmunjom.
2. Send an unarmed tugboat to Wonsan to retrieve the Pueblo.
3. Conduct air-naval show of force off Wonsan.
4. Execute selective air strikes against North Korea military and industrial targets.

The J-3 report emphasized that option 4 must be a prerequisite before options 2 and 3 can be considered, and that other potential options, such as the seizure of North Korean naval and merchant marine ships on the high seas, offered a "small chance of success, half measures, and less worthiness than should be expected of a great power." The Joints Chiefs met later that day to consider how any mobilization to meet this unfolding Pueblo crisis would affect U.S. military operations in Vietnam.

On Friday, 26 January 1968, the inter-agency Korea Working Group met to discuss the Pueblo crisis, which included consideration of the following military, diplomatic, and economic options:

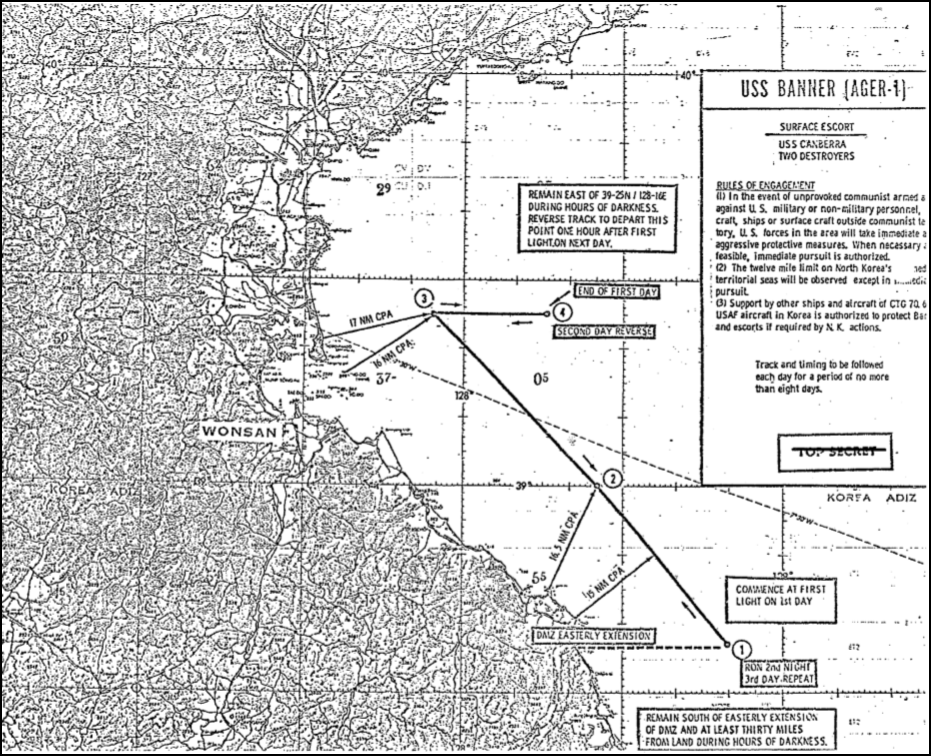
Proposed track of USS Banner (January 1968)

1. Selected air strikes on North Korea. This option involved ninety-two U.S. Navy, U.S. Air Force, and South Korean air force aircraft striking the North Korean air base at Wonsan and the near-by Munp'yong-ni naval base.
2. Naval blockade of Wonsan. Leveraging carrier-based air cover, U.S. and possibly South Korean naval units could impose a blockade within Wonsan's twelve-mile limit. To achieve air superiority, strikes against North Korean military airfields would "quite possibly" be required.
3. Mine Wonsan Harbor. Carrier-based A-6 attack aircraft would fly seventeen sorties to drop eighty-three mines in one night, and thereafter the A-6 aircraft would "reseed" the minefield as necessary.
4. Seize North Korean vessels. The option would act as retaliation in kind, seizing either a North Korean merchant vessel or a warship, and then using that vessel as a bargaining chip for the release of the Pueblo and its crew.
5. Sail USS Banner into the area where Pueblo had been seized. This would demonstrate U.S. determination to exercise freedom of the seas positing the Banner a minimum of thirteen miles from the North Korean coast for eight days (see map). Two destroyers, a cruiser, and possibly a South Korean unit would escort the Banner, and carrier aircraft would fly cover overhead. U.S. Air Force aircraft in South Korea would be on "strip alert" status for immediate readiness to take off.
6. Recover cryptographic material jettisoned by Pueblo. This recovery operation involve a U.S. Navy tug and mine warfare vessels from Sasebo, Japan, plus special detection gear from the United States. Carrier-based and land-based aircraft would provide air cover. The salvage unit would only operate during daylight, and the entire operation would terminate after ten days.
7. Conduct airborne reconnaissance. This option involved flying reconnaissance missions in an attempt to convince North Korea that the United States was preparing for military operations, including electronic warfare missions.
8. Inform the Soviets of actual or possible military moves. This option would use the Soviet Union as a "back channel" to warn the North Korea against further provocations.
9. Raid across the Demilitarized Zone. This option involved a combine U.S.-ROK armored force raiding a major North Korean military post near the DMZ.
10. Economic pressure on North Korea. This option involved a total trade embargo by the United States and its allies, particularly a cessation of Japanese imports from North Korea and elimination of wheat exports.

On 29 January 1968, a senior advisory panel reviewed the working group's list of options and recommended a diplomatic, non-military approach to ending the Pueblo crisis. To support this diplomatic effort, Operation Formation Star was initiated, with the Enterprise-led Task Group 70.6 serving initially as its centerpiece.

Task Group 70.6

Escort screen		Carrier Air Wing Nine (CVW-9) squadrons embarked aboard flagship USS Enterprise (CVAN-65)			
USS Truxtun (DLGN-35)	USS Higbee (DDR-806)	Fighter Squadron 96 (VF-96): 16 F-4B	Attack Squadron 113 (VA-113): 14 A-4E	Reconn. Attack (Heavy) Squadron 1 (RVAH-1): 6 RA-5C	Airborne Early Warning Squadron 112 (VAW-112): 4 E-2A
USS Halsey (DLG-23)	USS Collett (DD-730)	Fighter Squadron 92 (VF-92): 13 F-4B	Attack Squadron 56 (VA-56): 13 A-4E	Heavy Attack Squadron 2 (VAH-2), Det. 65: 6 KA-3B	Helicopter Combat Squadron 1 (HC-1), Det. 65: 3 UH-2C
USS Ozbourn (DD-846)	USS O'Bannon (DDE-450)	———	Attack Squadron 35 (VA-35): 12 A-6A	AEW Squadron Thirteen (VAW-13), Det. 65: 3 EKA-3B	Carrier Onboard Delivery (COD): 1 C-1A

Ships of Task Group 70.6
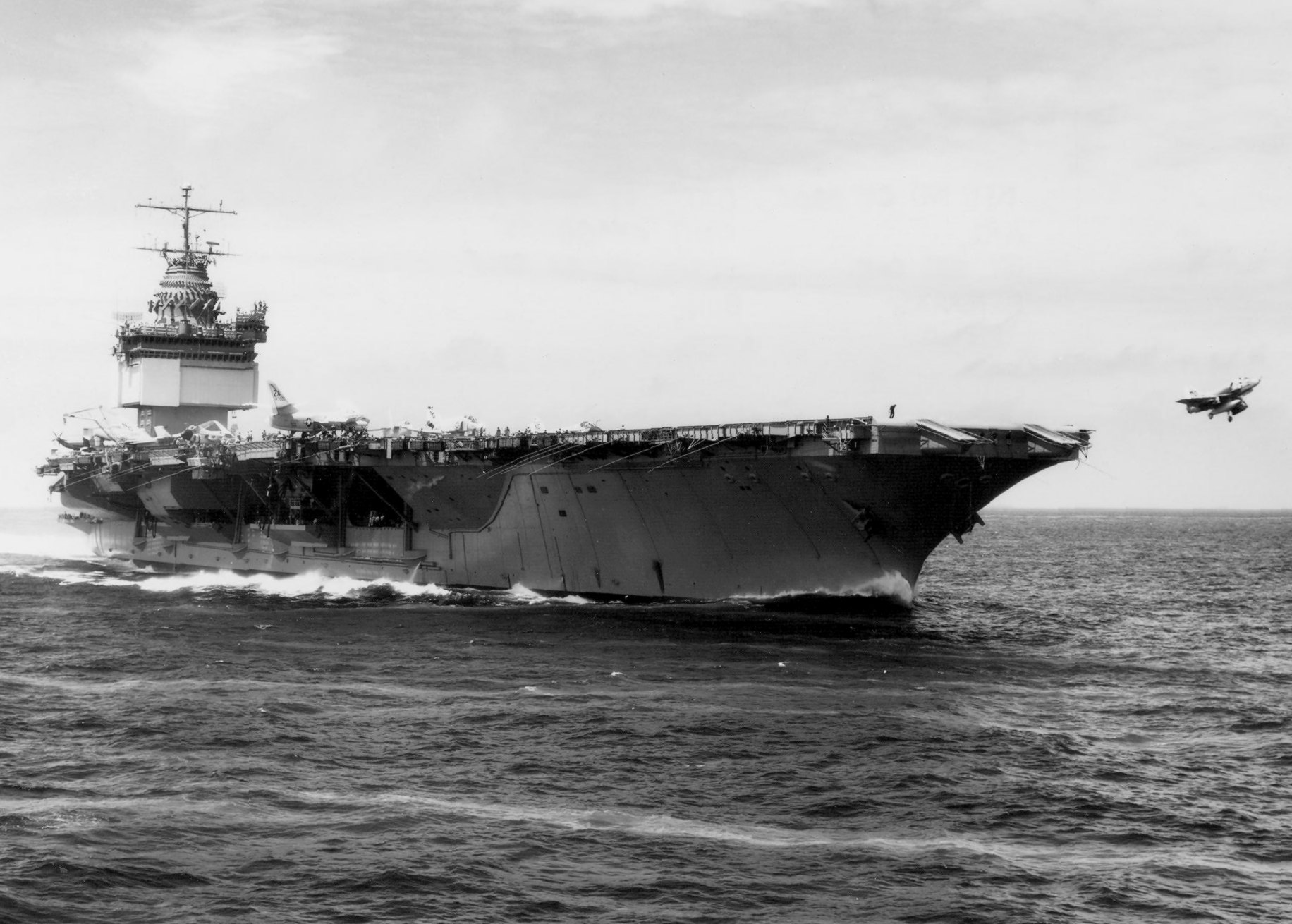
USS Enterprise (CVAN-65), flagship

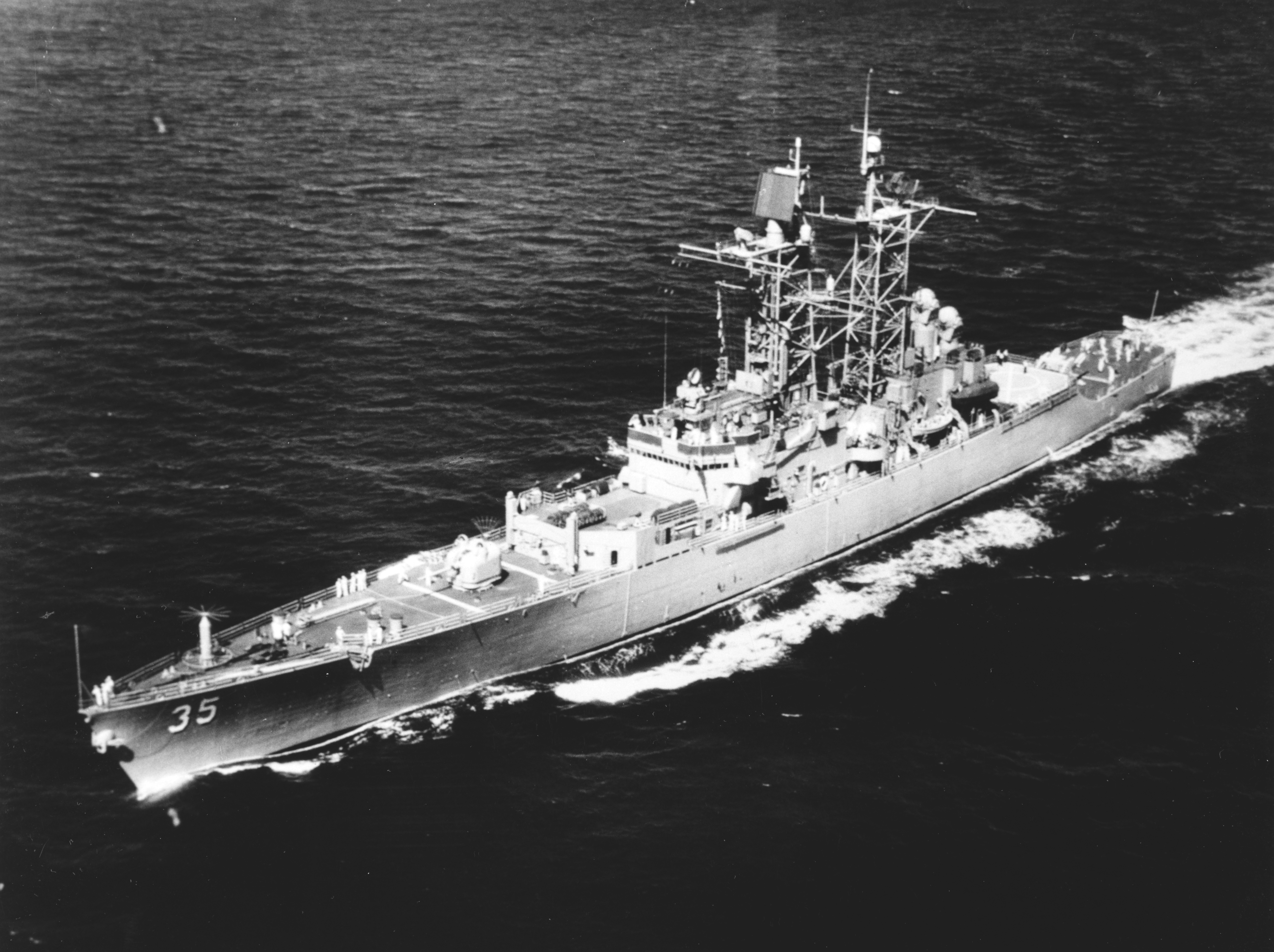
USS Truxtun (DLGN-35)

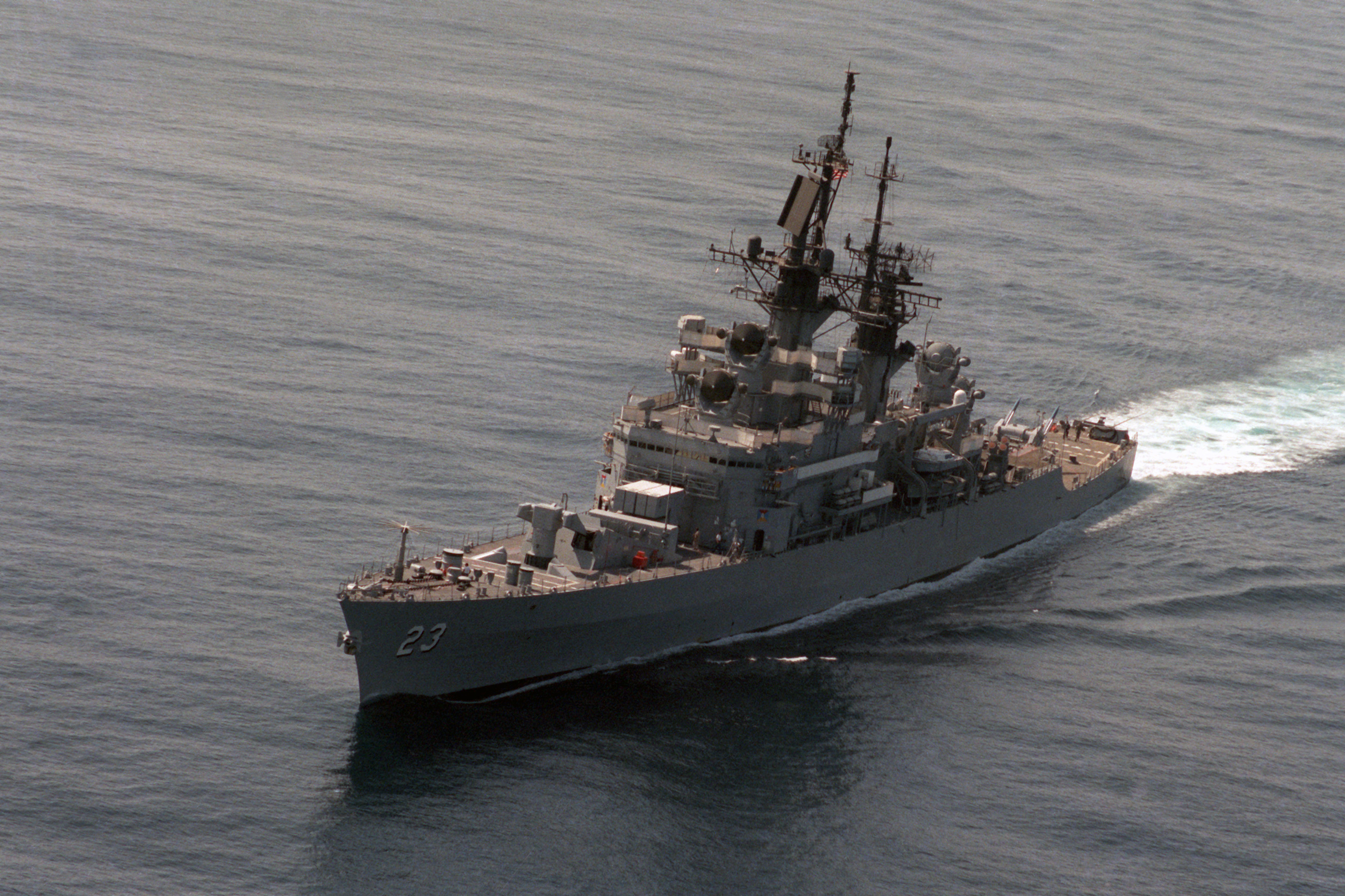
USS Halsey (DLG-23)

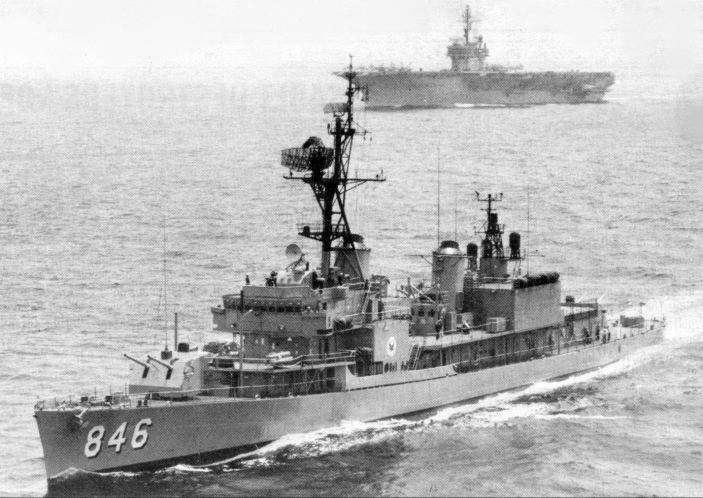
USS Ozbourn (DD-846) with USS Kitty Hawk (CVA-63) in background

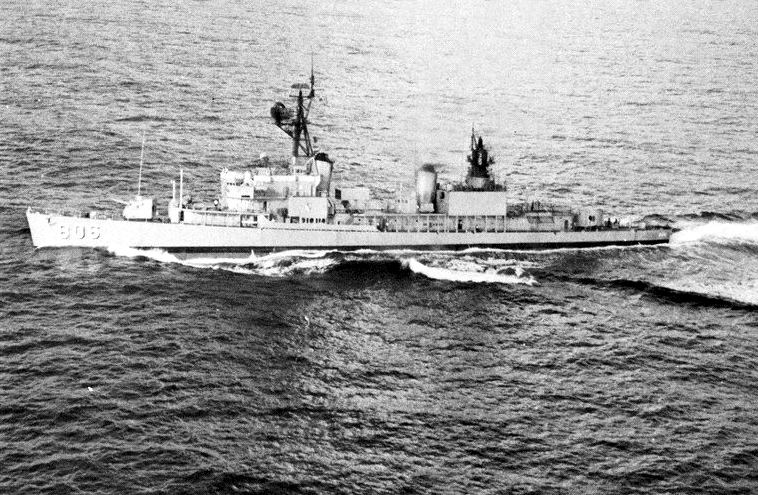
USS Higbee (DDR-806)

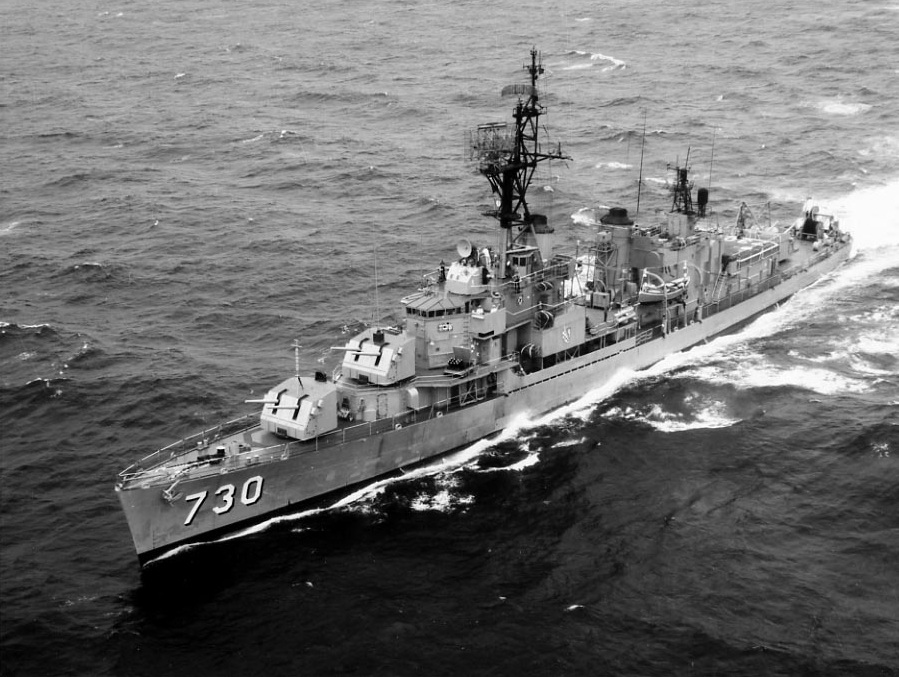
USS Collett (DD-730)

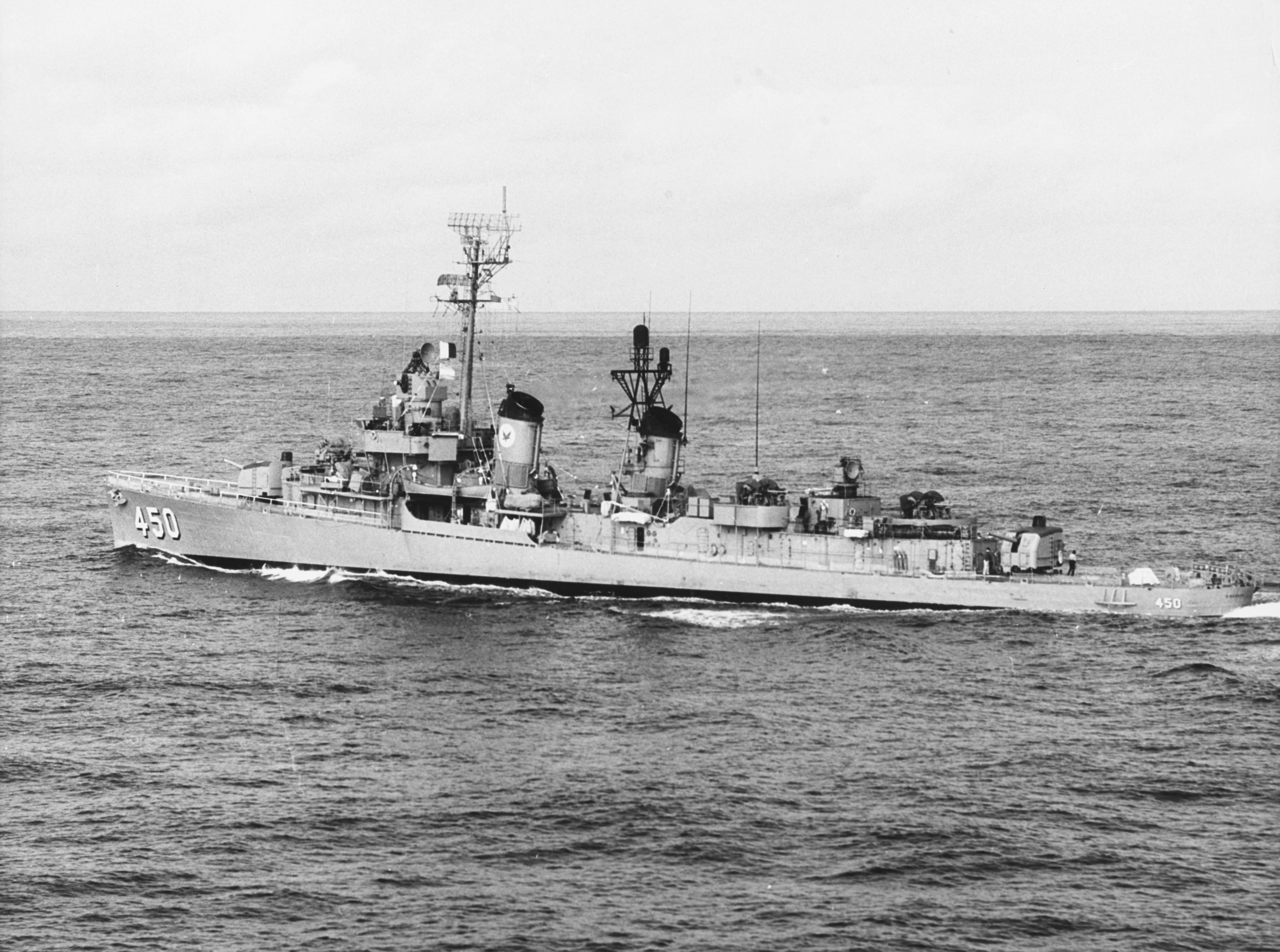
USS O'Bannon (DDE-450)

=== Naval build-up ===
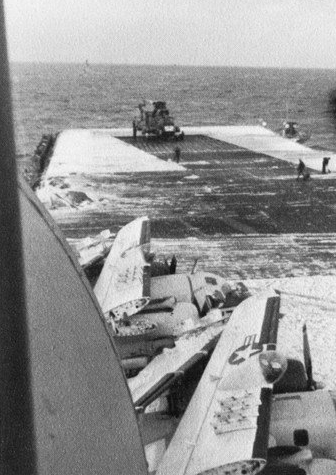
USS Yorktown (CVS-10), February 1968

Effective 25 January 1968, in conjunction with Operation Combat Fox, Operation Formation Star was initiated. Both operations represented a major surge deployment of U.S. naval and air forces into the Sea of Japan region off the eastern coast of North Korea, the largest since the end of the Korean War. Taken together, the purpose of this build-up/call-up was to provide a "measured show of force" in support of the diplomatic effort to resolve the Pueblo crisis peacefully.

Although not directly related to Operation Formation Star, the Republic of Korea Navy also dispatched nineteen ships and two fast patrol boats to sixteen patrol zones around South Korea. Likewise, at the United Nations Command in South Korea, General Charles H. Bonesteel III was concerned about border security and recommended two U.S. destroyers and maritime patrol aircraft reinforce the South Korean naval and air units conducting maritime patrol and interdiction.

==== Task Force 71 ====
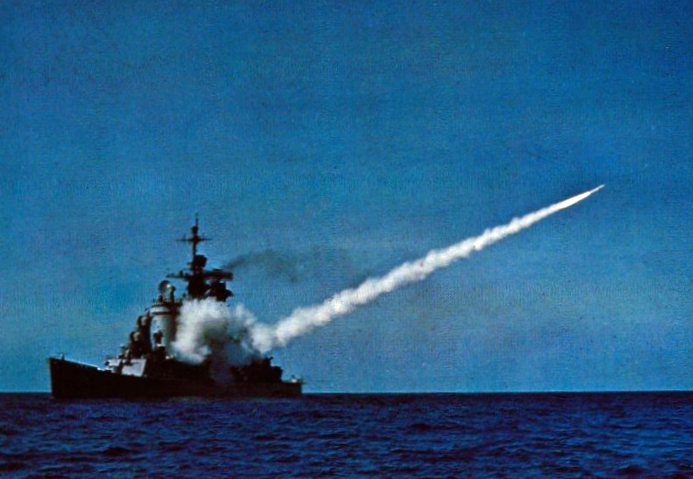
USS Chicago (CG-11)

On 25 January 1968, the newly augmented Enterprise-led Task Group 70.6 sailed through Tsushima Strait and into the Sea of Japan. The task group would operate below 36th parallel North during Operation Formation Star. Between 24 and 26 January 1968, the destroyers Higbee, Collett, O'Bannon, and Ozbourn joined Task Group 70.6.

On 27 January 1968, Task Group 77.7 led by the attack aircraft carrier Ranger was detached from duty with Task Force 77 at Yankee Station off North Vietnam and was ordered to the Sea of Japan as part of Operation Formation Star, arriving at Defender Station on 31 January 1968. In order to do so, the tour of duty for the attack aircraft carrier Coral Sea with the U.S. Seventh Fleet was extended by another month. Likewise, the support aircraft carrier Yorktown and its Task Group 70.0 were ordered to forego a scheduled port-call in Japan and was diverted to the Sea of Japan. By 1 February 1968, Yorktown, Ranger and Enterprise were operating in the Sea of Japan as Task Force 71 under the command of Rear Admiral Horace H. Epes, Jr., with the Enterprise as his flagship.

Task Force 71 was organized into a two-carrier strike group (Enterprise and Ranger), a surface action group, and an anti-submarine warfare (ASW) unit centered around the Yorktown and her escorts. As the surface sub-surface surveillance operations coordinator (SSSC) for Task Force 71, the Yorktown and its embarked Carrier Anti-Submarine Air Group 55 (CVSG-55) provided near-continuous anti-submarine warfare (ASW) and anti-shipping air operations throughout February 1968, with the exception of a single period of nine hours when flight operations were suspended owing to inclement winter weather conditions (pictured).

The area air defense for Task Force 71 was greatly enhanced when the guided-missile cruiser Chicago (pictured) was detached from PIRAZ duty off Vietnam for operations in the Sea of Japan on 28 January 1968. Equipped with modernized electronic systems, an improved combat information center using the Naval Tactical Data System (NTDS), and long-range RIM-8 Talos anti-aircraft missiles, Chicago coordinated air activities for the TF-71 aircraft carriers. The Canberra and Providence were the other two guided-missile cruisers assigned to Task Force 71, joining the guided-missile frigates Bainbridge, Halsey, and Dewey.

Task Force 71, 1968

Naval Aviation Units			Screening Force					Logistical Support
Command	Aircraft Carriers	Carrier Air Wing	Cruisers / DLG	Destroyers / DDG	Destroyers	Destroyers	Destroyers / Destroyer Escorts	TF-73 Detachment
Carrier Division 1	USS Enterprise (CVAN-65)	Carrier Air Wing 9	USS Canberra (CAG-2)	USS Lynde McCormick (DDG-8)	USS Everett F. Larson (DD-830)	USS Buck (DD-761)	USS Renshaw (DD-499)	USS Sacramento (AOE-1)
Carrier Division 3	USS Ranger (CVA-61)	Carrier Air Wing 2	USS Chicago (CG-11)	USS John R. Craig (DD-885)	USS Higbee (DDR-806)	USS Strong (DD-758)	USS O'Bannon (DDE-450)	USS Platte (AO-24)
Carrier Division 7	USS Coral Sea (CVA-43)	Carrier Air Wing 15	USS Providence (CLG-6)	USS Leonard F. Mason (DD-852)	USS James E. Kyes (DD-787)	USS John A. Bole (DD-755)	USS Radford (DD-446)	USS Tolovana (AO-64)
Carrier Division 9	USS Ticonderoga (CVA-14)	Carrier Air Wing 19	USS Truxtun (DLGN-35)	USS Ozbourn (DD-846)	USS Henderson (DD-785)	USS Frank E. Evans (DD-754)	USS Bradley (DE-1041)	USS Mars (AFS-1)
(NAVAIRPAC)	USS Kearsarge (CVS-33)	ASW Air Group 53	USS Halsey (DLG-23)	USS Herbert J. Thomas (DD-833)	USS McKean (DD-784)	USS Taussig (DD-746)	USS Brooke (DEG-1)	USS Vesuvius (AE-15)
ASW Group 1	USS Yorktown (CVS-10)	ASW Air Group 55	USS Dewey (DLG-14)	USS Hanson (DD-832)	USS Rowan (DD-782)	USS Collett (DD-730)	——	USS Samuel Gompers (AD-37)

Aircraft carriers of Task Force 71
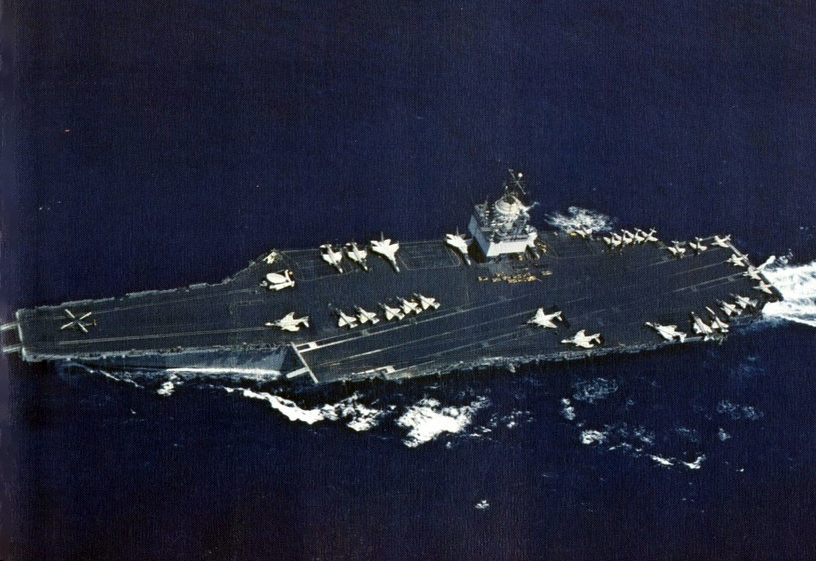
USS Enterprise (CVAN-65), flagship

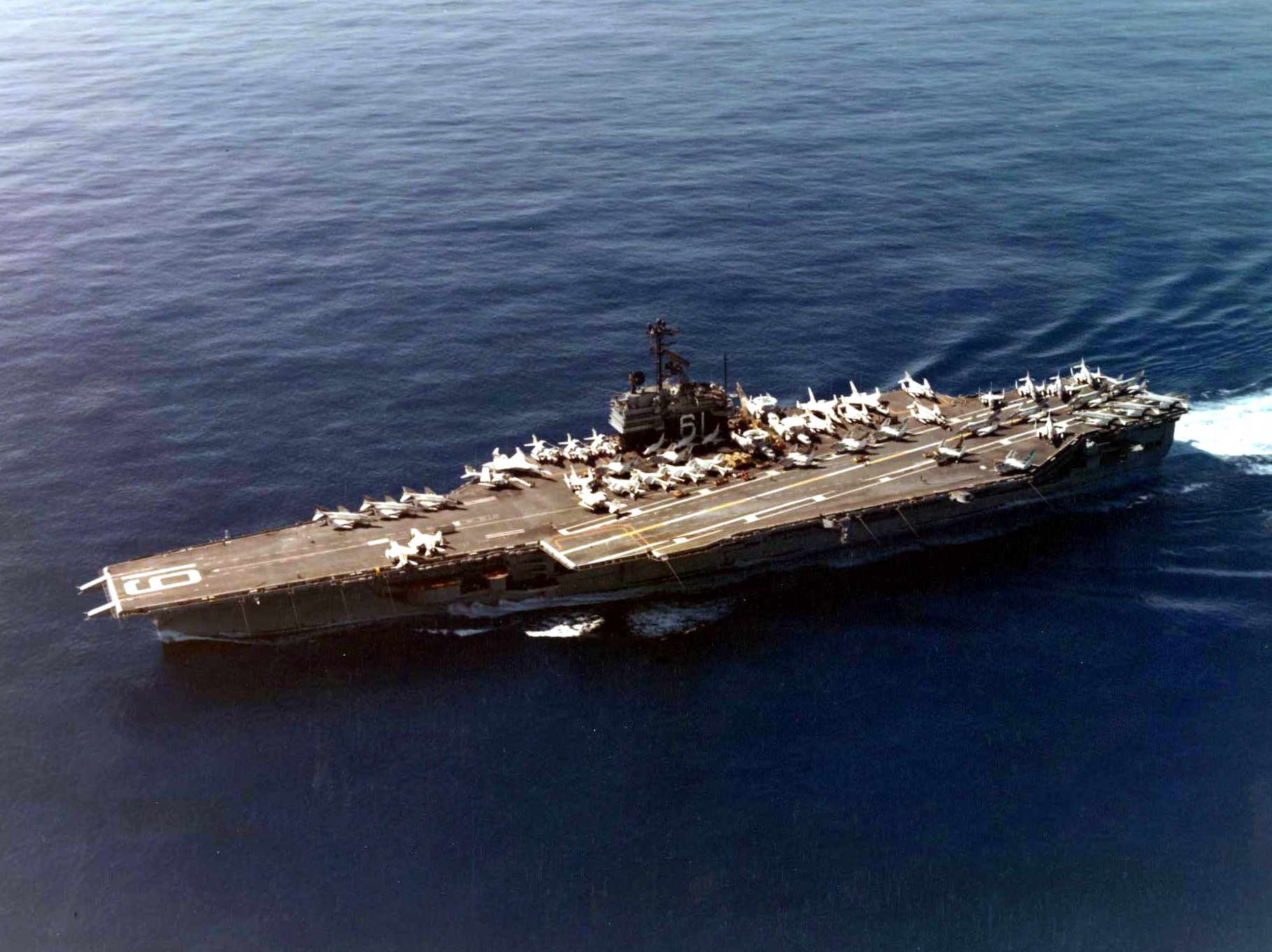
USS Ranger (CVA-61)

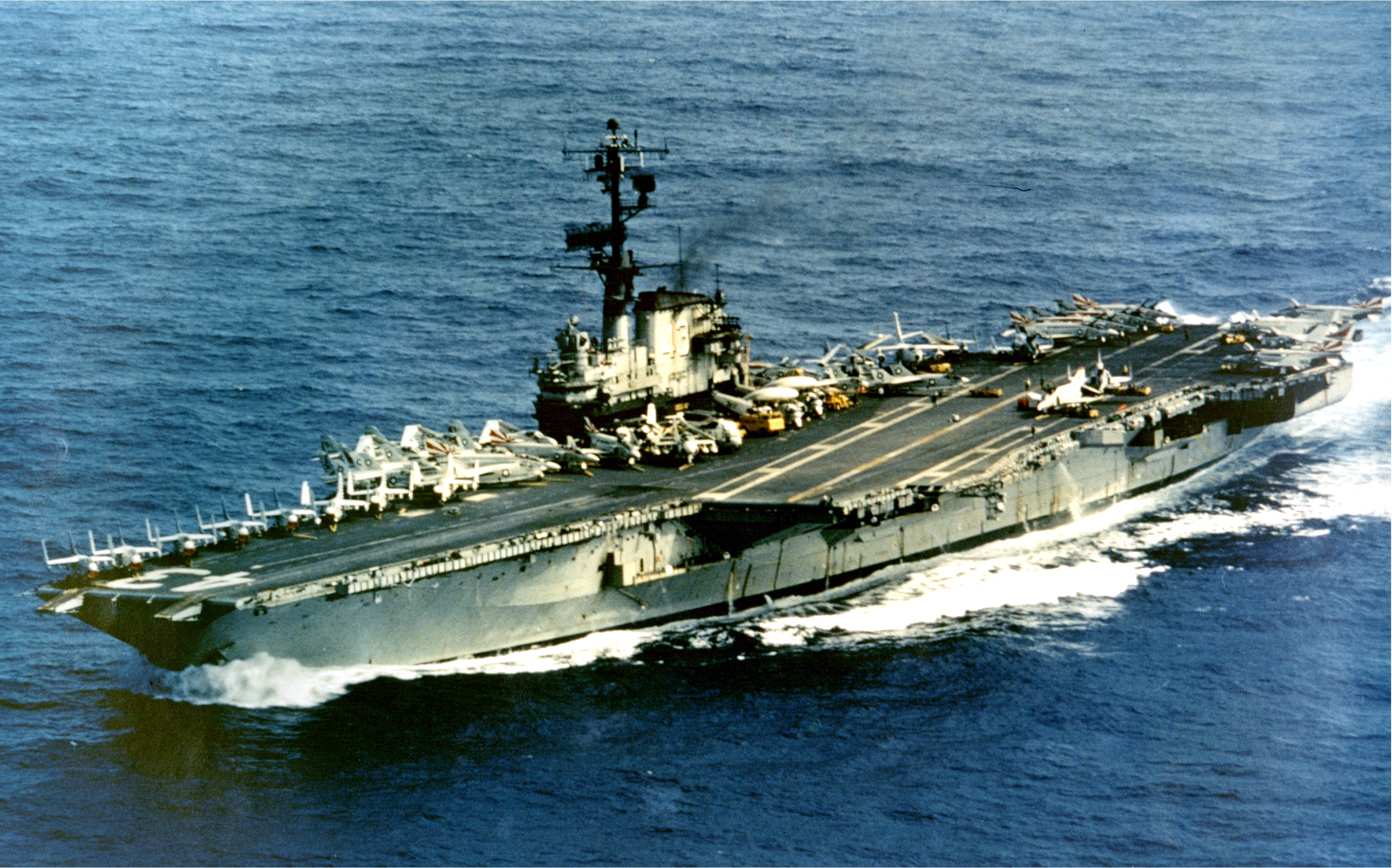
USS Coral Sea (CVA-43)

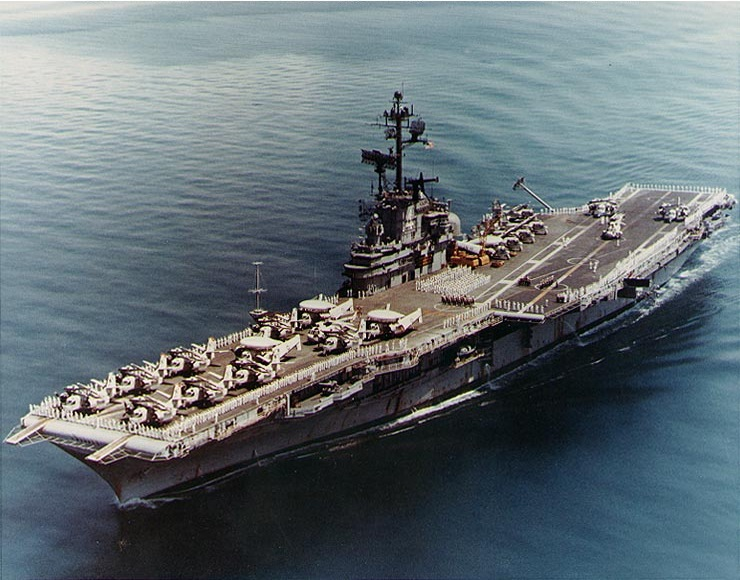
USS Ticonderoga (CVA-14)

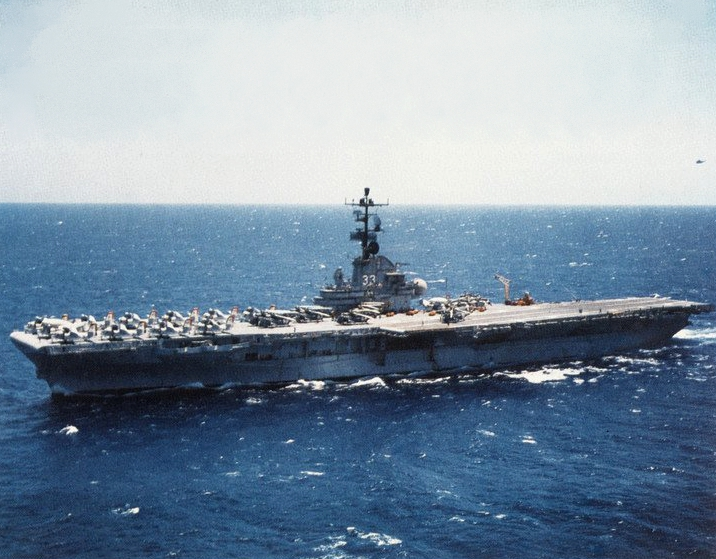
USS Kearsarge (CVS-33)

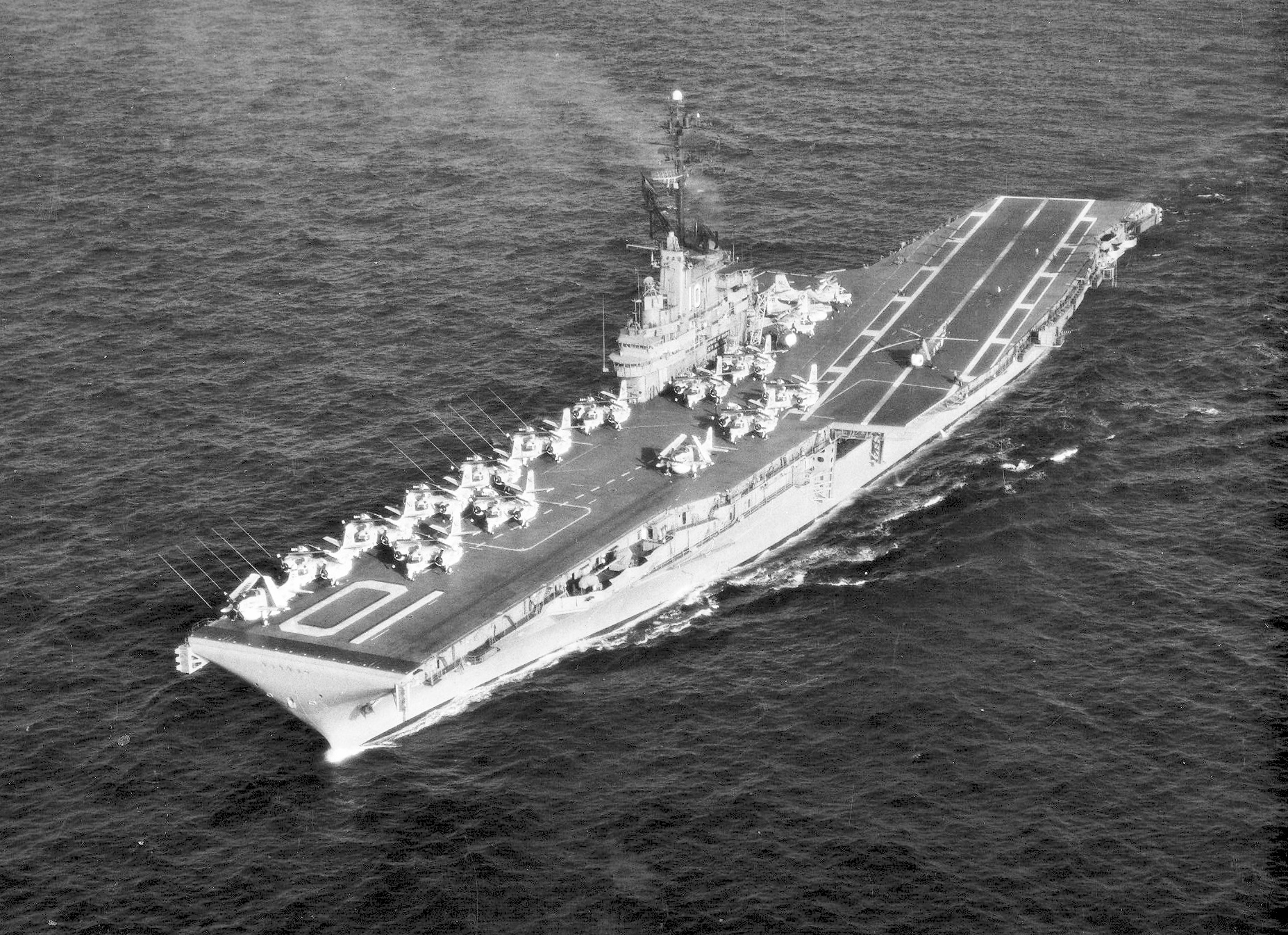
USS Yorktown (CVS-10)

Assigned Carrier Air Wings - Task Force 71, 1968

Aircraft	USS Ranger (CVA-61) Carrier Air Wing 2 (CVW-2)	USS Enterprise (CVAN-65) Carrier Air Wing 9 (CVW-9)	USS Coral Sea (CVA-43) Carrier Air Wing 15 (CVW-15)	USS Ticonderoga (CVA-14) Carrier Air Wing 19 (CVW-19)	USS Kearsarge (CVS-33) ASW Air Group 53 (CVSG-53)	USS Yorktown (CVS-10) ASW Air Group 55 (CVSG-55)
F-4B Phantom II	28	29	21	—	—	—
F-8G Crusader	—	—	—	26	—	—
A-1H/J Skyraider	—	—	11	—	—	—
A-4E/A-4F Skyhawk	15	27	24	28	—	—
A-6A Intruder	10	12	—	—	—	—
A-7A Corsair II	18	—	—	—	—	—
RA-5C Vigilante	6	6	—	—	—	—
KA-3B Skywarrior	3	6	4	3	—	—
E-1B Tracer	—	—	—	3	4	1
E-2A Hawkeye	4	4	4	—	—	—
EA-1F Skyraider	—	—	2	3	—	—
EKA-3B Skywarrior	3	3	—	—	—	—
RF-8G Crusader	—	—	2	3	2	—
UH-2C Seasprite	3	3	3	3	—	—
C-1A (COD)	1	1	1	1	—	—
S-2E (ASW)	—	—	—	—	20	16
SH-3A (ASW)	—	—	—	—	20	16
Total	91	91	72	70	46	33
Sources						

==== Reserve call-up ====
Concurrent with Operation Formation Star and Operation Combat Fox, U.S. President Lyndon B. Johnson signed Executive Order 11392 ordering certain units of the Ready Reserve of the Naval Reserve, Air Force Reserve, and Air National Guard of the United States to active duty. For the U.S. Naval Reserve, this call-up involved six naval air reserve (NAR) squadrons totaling 72 aircraft (A-4 and F-8) as well as two Seabee construction battalions for an overall total of 1621 naval reservists activated. This was the first time that the Reserves had been called up for active duty since the Berlin Crisis of 1961.

NAR squadrons activated, 27 January to 1 November 1968

Squadron	Tail code	Assigned homeport(s)	Assigned aviation unit(s)	Assigned aircraft	Commanding officer
Attack Squadron VA 776 (VA-776)	NR	NAAS Los Alamitos – 27 Jan 1968; NAS Lemoore – 13 Jun 1968	COMFAIRALAMEDA	A-4B Skyhawk – Feb 1968; TA-4F Skyhawk – Jun 1968; A-4E Skyhawk – Jun 1968	Commander Milton E. Johnson, Jr.
Attack Squadron VA 831 (VA-831)	MA; AB	NAS New York – 27 January 1968; NAS Cecil Field – 30 May 1968	COMFAIRJACKSONVILLE; Carrier Air Wing One (CVW-1)	A-4B Skyhawk – January 1968	Commander Raymond Ketcham
Attack Squadron VA 873 (VA-873)	NR; NE	NAS Alameda – 27 Jan 1968	COMFAIRALAMEDA; Carrier Air Wing Two (CVW-2)	A-4B Skyhawk – Jan 1968; A-4C Skyhawk – May 1968	Commander Glen W. Stinnett, Jr.
Fighter Squadron VF 661 (VF-661)	MA	—	—	Vought F-8 Crusader	—
Fighter Squadron VF 703 (VF-703)	MA	—	—	Vought F-8 Crusader	—
Fighter Squadron VF 931 (VF-931)	MA	—	—	Vought F-8 Crusader	—

==== Anti-submarine warfare ====
Along with the support aircraft carrier Yorktown and her escorts, additional anti-submarine warfare (ASW) assets assigned to Operation Formation Star included land-based Lockheed SP-2H Neptune and Lockheed P-3A/B Orion maritime patrol aircraft from patrol squadrons VP-2, VP-17, VP-19, and VP-48. Between 24 and 31 January 1968, Neptune and Orion patrol aircraft flew over 50 ASW barrier patrols over the Sea of Japan and subsequently flew an additional 238 mission in February. This operational tempo placed such a burden on patrol aircraft based in Japan that additional aircraft from Okinawa and the Philippines were used to augment the barrier patrols.

Patrol squadrons assigned to Operation Formation Star

Squadron	Tail code	Assigned homeport(s)	Forward-deployed base(s)	Assigned aviation unit(s)	Assigned aircraft	Commanding officer
Patrol Squadron 2 (VP-2)	YC	NAS Whidbey Island	NS Sangley Point, R.P.	Fleet Air Wing 8 (FAW-8)	Lockheed SP-2H Neptune	Commander Lee Maice, Jr.
Patrol Squadron 17 (VP-17)	ZE	NAS Whidbey Island	NS Sangley Point, R.P.	Fleet Air Wing 8 (FAW-8)	Lockheed P2V-7 Neptune	Commander Clifford R. Behnken
Patrol Squadron 19 (VP-19)	PE	NAS Moffett Field	MCAS Iwakuni, Japan	Fleet Air Wing 6 (FAW-6)	Lockheed P-3B Orion	Commander Franklin H. Barker
Patrol Squadron 48 (VP-48)	SF	NAS Moffett Field	NS Sangley Point, R.P.	Fleet Air Wing 10 (FAW-10)	Lockheed P-3A Orion	Commander Donald J. Childers

==== Logistic support ====
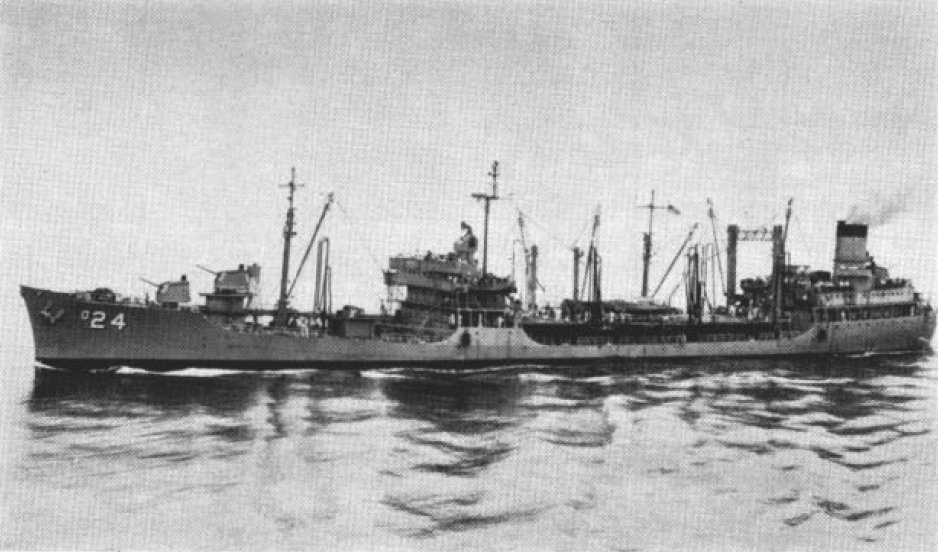
USS Platte (AO-24)

To support Task Force 71, Task Force 73 created an underway replenishment (UNREP) group that included the fast combat support ship Sacramento; the fleet oilers Platte (pictured) and Tolovana, the combat stores ship Mars; and the ammunition ship Vesuvius. To service TF-71's flotilla of destroyers, the destroyer tender Samuel Gompers was deployed to Sasebo, Japan. The first UNREP ship to support Operation Formation Star was the fleet oiler Platte, arriving at Defender Station to replenish and refuel the Enterprise-led Task Group 70.6 over a four-day underway period before returning to Sasebo, Japan, on 31 January 1968.

==== USS Banner re-deployment ====
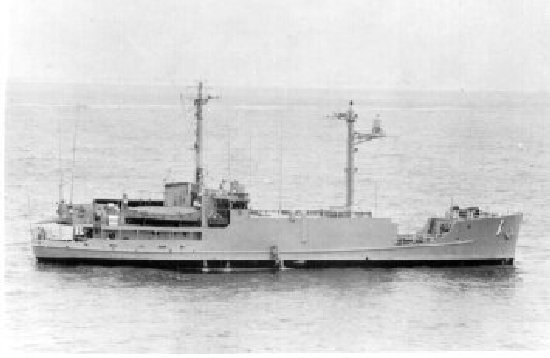
USS Banner

In conjunction with the naval build-up in the Sea of Japan under Operations Formation Star, USS Banner (pictured) was deployed to the Sea of Japan off the east coast of North Korea. The objective of this re-deployment was to reassert the right to carry out intelligence-gathering operations in international waters, with the Banner joining Task Force 71 on 31 January 1968. Unlike the Pueblo, the command-and-control apparatus during Banner's deployment was under the direct control of the U.S. Joint Chiefs of Staff via Admiral Ulysses S. Grant Sharp, Jr., the Commander-in-Chief of the U.S. Pacific Command. Also, a surface action group consisting of the heavy cruiser Canberra and destroyers Ozbourn and Higbee served as a covering force for the Banner, operating in the immediate vicinity while providing anti-submarine coverage.

==== Submarine operations ====
Of the seventeen U.S. submarines then deployed in the Far East, nine nuclear and non-nuclear submarines were ordered on 27 January 1968 to re-deploy to the Sea of Japan for up to three months of operations off the Korean Peninsula. At the direction of Rear Admiral Walter L. Small, the Commander Submarine Force, U.S. Pacific Fleet (COMSUBPAC), the out-chop (release from current assignment) orders were cancelled for the following submarines, causing them to remain with the U.S. Seventh Fleet:

- USS Segundo (SS-398)
- USS Volador (SS-490) (Note: From USS Volador 1968 Command History: VOLADOR commenced a Western Pacific deployment 24 July 1967. On 1 January 1968 VOLADOR was en route to Hong Kong, B.C.C. for an R&R period. The ship remained inport, Hong Kong, B.C.C. from 10–15 January with all hands enjoying liberty in this fine port-of-call. On departure Hong Kong, VOLADOR proceeded north-east for a final upkeep at Yokosuka, Japan prior to returning to CONUS. The ship arrived in Yokosuka 24 January 1968 to learn that the ship's deployment was being indefinitely extended because of mobilization response to the capture of U.S.S. PUEBLO (AGR-2) by the North Koreans. VOLADOR departed for sea on 31 January returning to Yokosuka, Japan 31 days later. After a short upkeep in Yokosuka, VOLADOR departed Japan for CONUS with a short stop at Pearl Harbor 21–22 March arriving in San Diego 29 March.)
- USS Greenfish (SS-351)
- USS Swordfish (SSN-579)
- USS Blueback (SS-581)
- USS Flasher (SSN-613)

The wintery weather and presence of sea ice in the Sea of Japan caused numerous hazards to the submarines assigned to Operation Formation Star. The nuclear-powered attack submarine Flasher (pictured) was on patrol near the harbor of Wonsan when a small ice flow snapped off the top of a periscope. Flasher proceeded to Guam to have the periscope replaced and then returned to her patrol area off North Korea. Likewise, the nuclear-powered attack submarine Swordfish (pictured) sustained significant damage to her masts from an ice block in the Sea of Japan on 3 March 1968 and forced to proceed to United States Fleet Activities Yokosuka in Japan for repairs.

More serious was the alleged two-day, non-stop depth-charging of the Segundo (pictured) by the North Korean Navy off Wonsan harbor, which damaged the submarine's forward decking and ruptured a fuel tank. Shipboard classified materials and equipment were prepared for destruction in case the Segundo was forced to the surface and boarded. (Note: An online article dated June 27, 2019 speculated that the submarines USS Segundo (SS-398) and USS Swordfish (SSN-579) were part of Operation Star Formation, but does not provide any independent, verifiable documentation to its claims, although a 2020 article in the American Submariner magazine published by the United States Submarine Veterans, Inc., appears to confirm this.) As a potential consequence of this alleged incident, in July 1970, a U.S. Navy Board of Inspection and Survey survey team determined that the Segundo was unfit for further service, and she was decommissioned on 1 August 1970 and subsequently sunk as a target by USS Salmon (SS-573) on 8 August 1970.

Finally, the GUPPY IIA diesel-electric submarine USS Ronquil (SS-396) (pictured) was specifically tasked for cover and search-and rescue operations during the Pueblo crisis that conceivable could have included special operation missions.

Submarines of Operation Formation Star
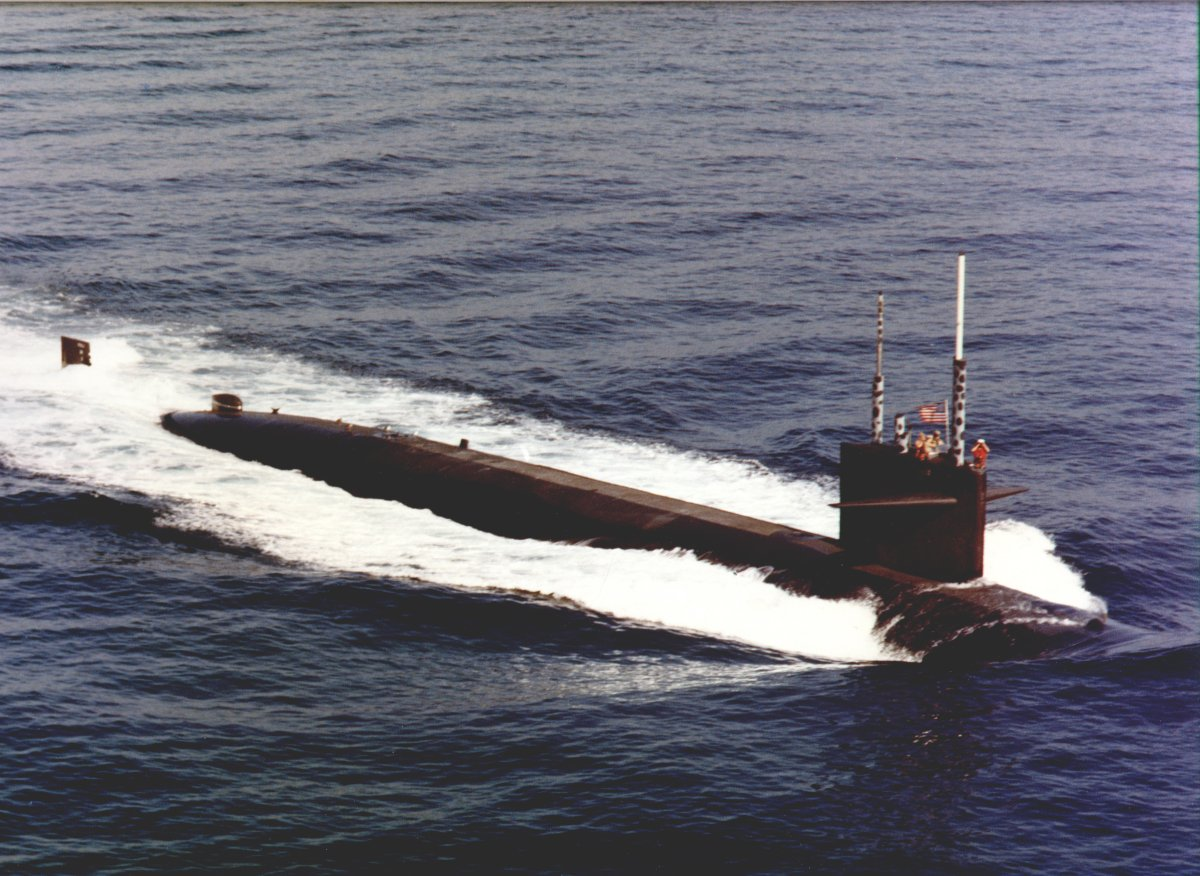
USS Flasher (SSN-613)

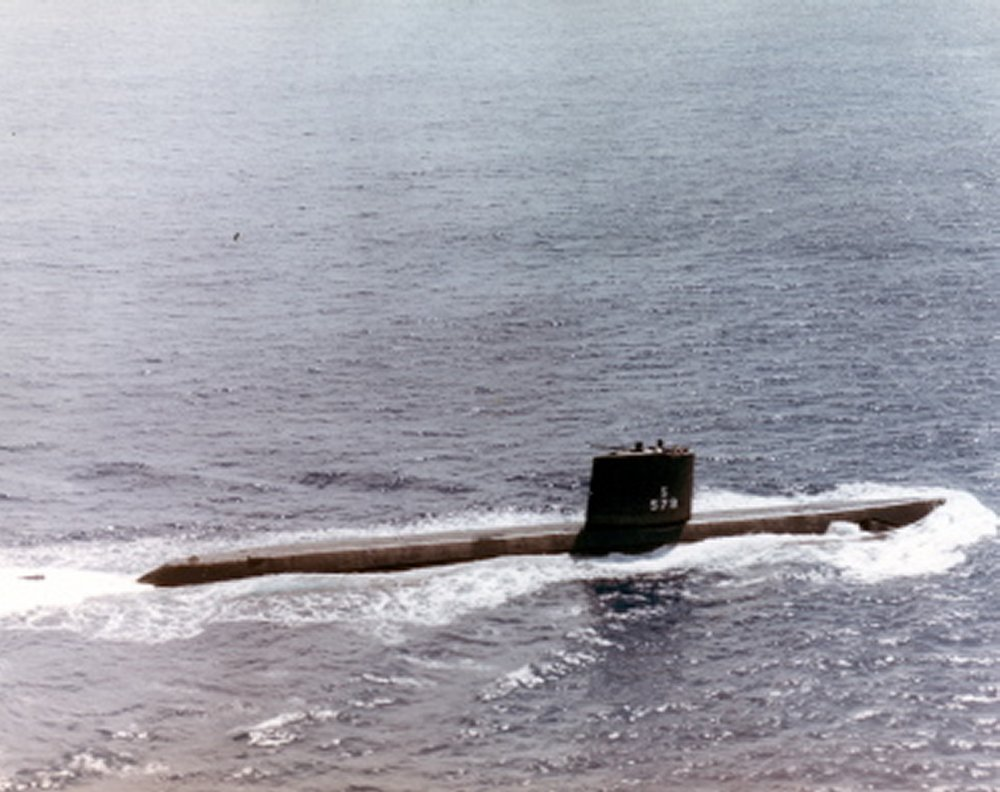
USS Swordfish (SSN-579)

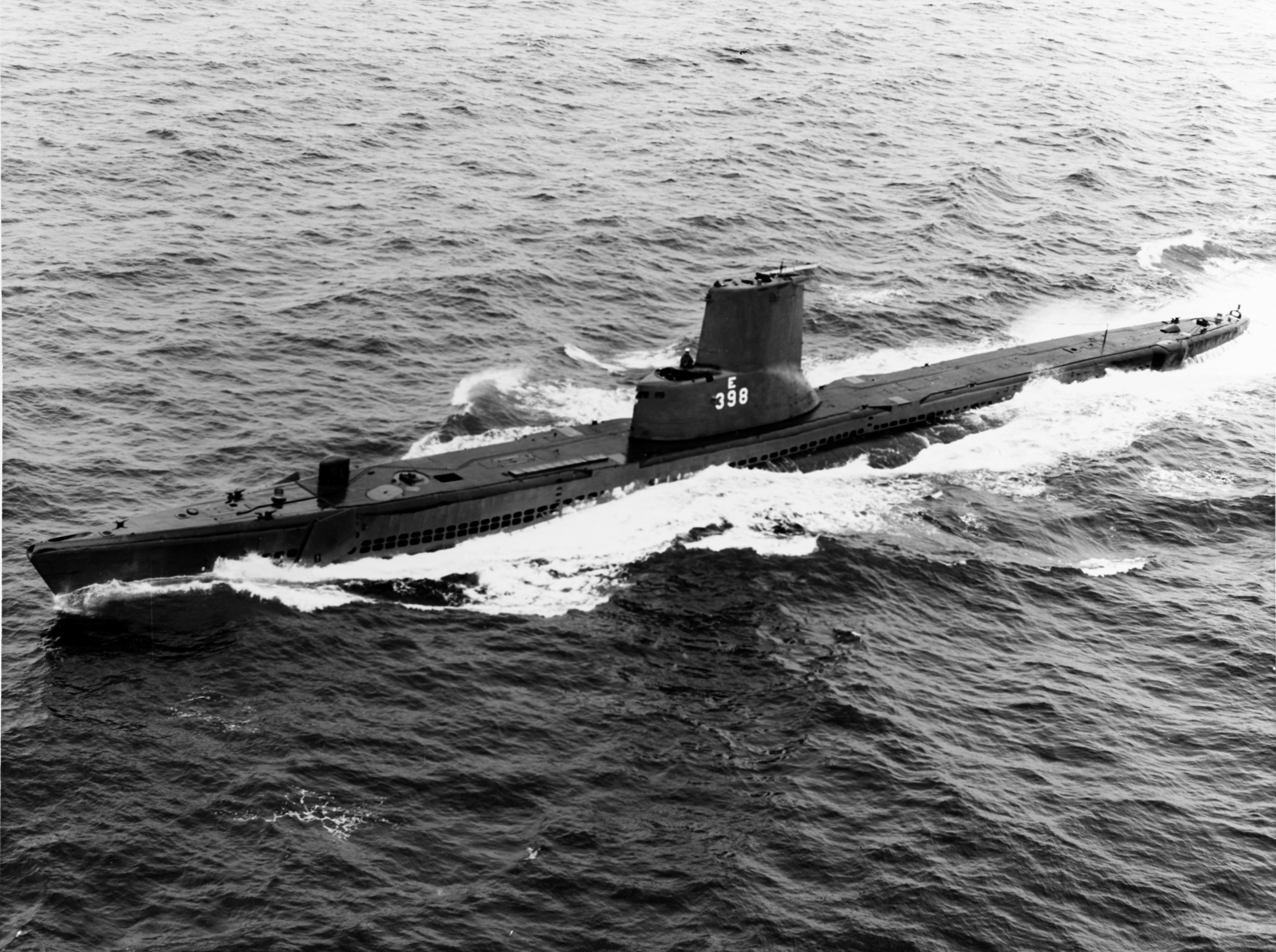
USS Segundo (SS-398)

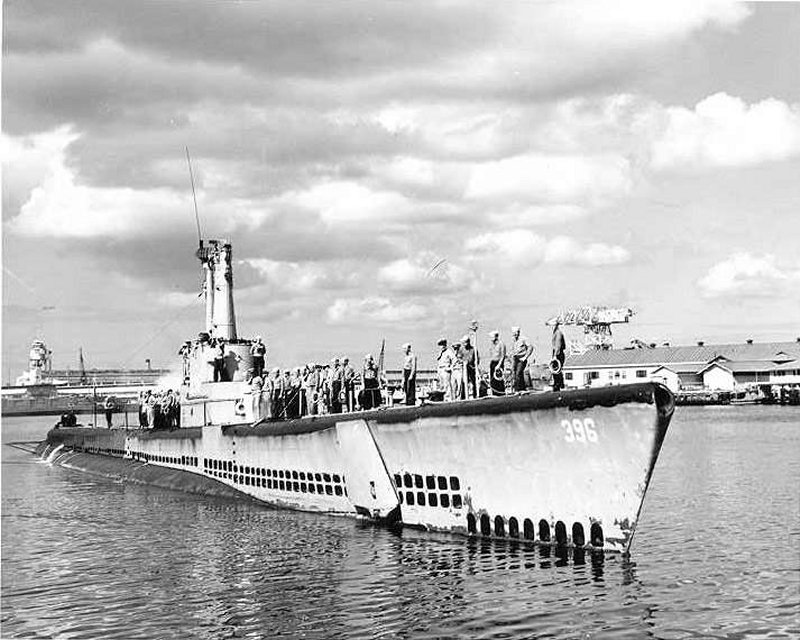
USS Ronquil (SS-396)

=== Contingency operations ===
==== Boarding and rescue mission ====
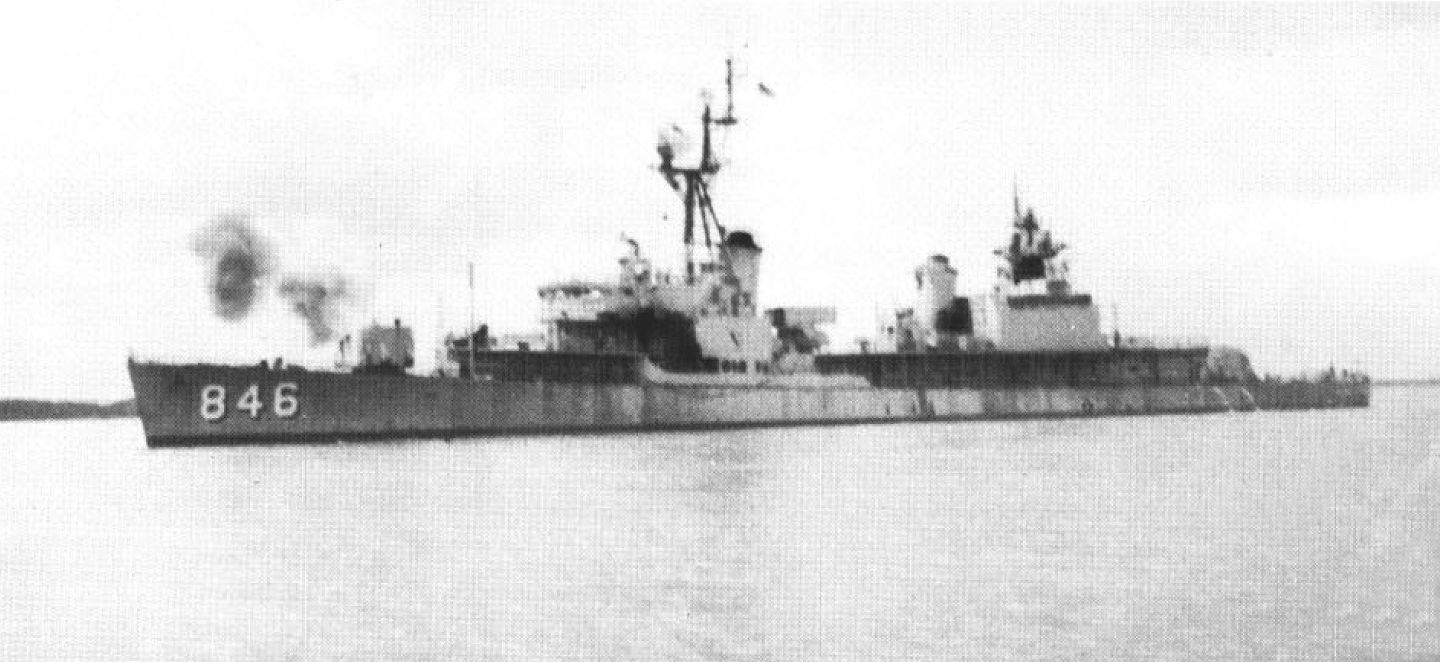
USS Ozbourn off South Vietnam (1967)

While the inter-agency Korea Working Group in Washington, D.C., met to consider military options, Seventh Fleet planners were likewise considering contingency operations. One proposed option was a cutting-out operation wherein a destroyer would enter Wonson harbor, board and re-take the docked Pueblo, and tow the ship out to the open water, with a second destroyer providing support. Pacific Fleet commander Admiral John J. Hyland, Jr. initially directed the Seventh Fleet to divert the destroyer Higbee to Wonsan and "prepare to engage in operations that may include towing Pueblo and/or retrieval of Pueblo crew/provide air cover as appropriate." The Higbee was eventually recalled and the boarding operation was not initially undertaken.

After his ship joined Task Force 71 on 24 January 1968, Commander John G. Denham volunteered USS Ozbourn for this mission, citing the ship's success in supporting Operation Sea Dragon off the coast of South Vietnam (pictured). Admiral Epes approved Denham's request, and the Ozbourn's crew began drilling in preparation for the mission. The plan called for a 10-man boarding party to retake the moored Pueblo in Wonsan harbor and then lash that ship to the Ozbourn which would back out and exit the harbor. While confident, Commander Denham noted: "I didn't know what this would cost us, but I couldn't see us getting out there free."

During part of this time, Ozbourn operated with the surface action group providing cover for the spy ship Banner off the east coast of North Korea, with the other destroyer being the Higbee. Had this later boarding option been executed, it was likely Higgins would have provided support to Ozbourn in Wonsan harbor while the guided-missile heavy cruiser Canberra provided long-range naval gunfire support by bombarding the harbor as well as offering anti-aircraft missile defense against North Korea aircraft. (Note: Another back-up destroyer was the USS Collett (DD-730). See "Recollections of the role of the USS COLLETT in the USS PUEBLO Incident of 1968" by Don Walton, CDR, USN (Ret).)

Although the Ozbourn was on alert for the next 30 days after joining Task Force 71, the boarding-rescue mission was never executed, and the Ozbourn was released from duty with Task Force 71 on 4 March 1968. (Note: One factor that undoubtedly influenced the decision not to go ahead with the boarding-rescue mission was that by 5 February 1968 a picket line of Soviet warships had formed along the 38th parallel North that could provide advanced warning to North Korea of any carrier aircraft heading to Wonsan in support of such a mission. See Mobley. Flash Point North Korea, p. 68. Likewise, the Soviet intelligence-gathering vessel Gidrofon was directly monitoring Task Force 71 operations in the Sea of Japan and could also provide advanced warning of any carrier air strikes. See Kearsarge III (CV-33) 1946–1973 – Dictionary of American Naval Fighting Ships.)

==== Air strikes ====
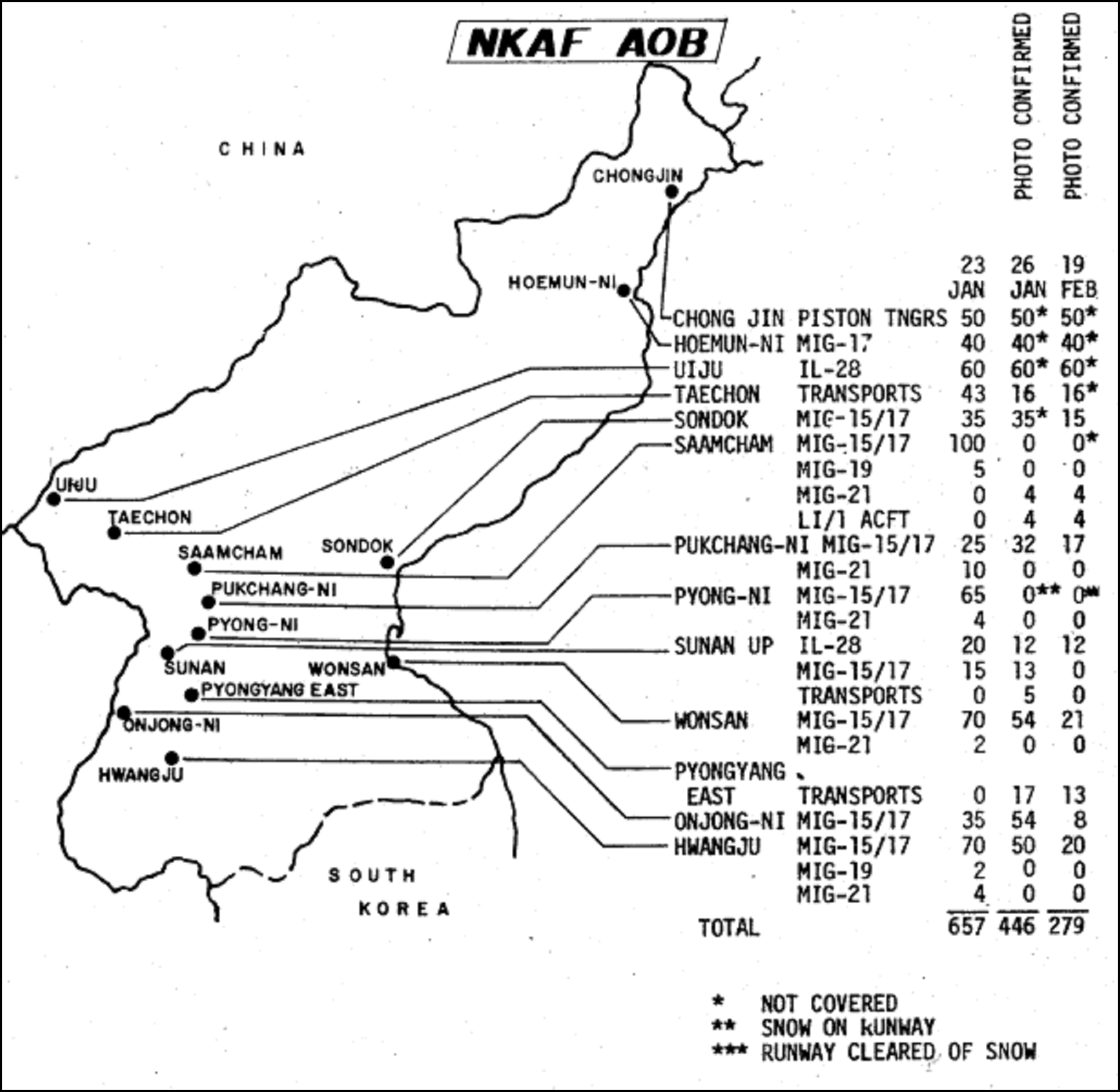
North Korean Air Force disposition (January 23, 1968)

On 28 February 1968, the J-3 division of the Joint Staff submitted to the Joint Chiefs of Staff a follow-up report on the force readiness and intelligence-gathering assets on the Korean peninsula while also recommending "an all-out attack to neutralize the North Korean Air Force and its bases" if diplomatic efforts alone did not result in the release of the Pueblo and its crew.

Code-named Fresh Storm, CINCPAC planners proposed multiple options for quick-reaction air strikes against North Korea, with the first option ("Alpha") supported by carrier-based aircraft from Task Force 71 while the third option ("Charlie") involved a joint strike operation by carrier-based and land-based aircraft. (Note: Options "Charlie" and "Delta" involved U.S. tactical aircraft, the Republic of Korea Air Force, and B-52 bombers.) A final separate option ("Echo") was a massive combined air campaign that was designed "to eliminate without delay the North Korean order of battle by striking all North Korean airfield" (see map) using various combinations of bombers and attack aircraft from Task Force 71, the U.S. Fifth Air Force, and the Republic of Korea Air Force (ROKAF). (Note: Fresh Storm was also an option considered by the Nixon administration in response to the U.S. Navy's EC-121 electronic reconnaissance aircraft in 1969 by North Korea. See Document 12 (Tab K) and Document 16 (Item 12) cited in National Security Archive Electronic Briefing Book No. 322: How Do You Solve A Problem Like Korea? New Archive Document Collection Sheds Light on Nixon's Frustrating Search for Military Options by Robert Wampler, PhD, National Security Archive - George Washington University, dated June 23, 2010.)

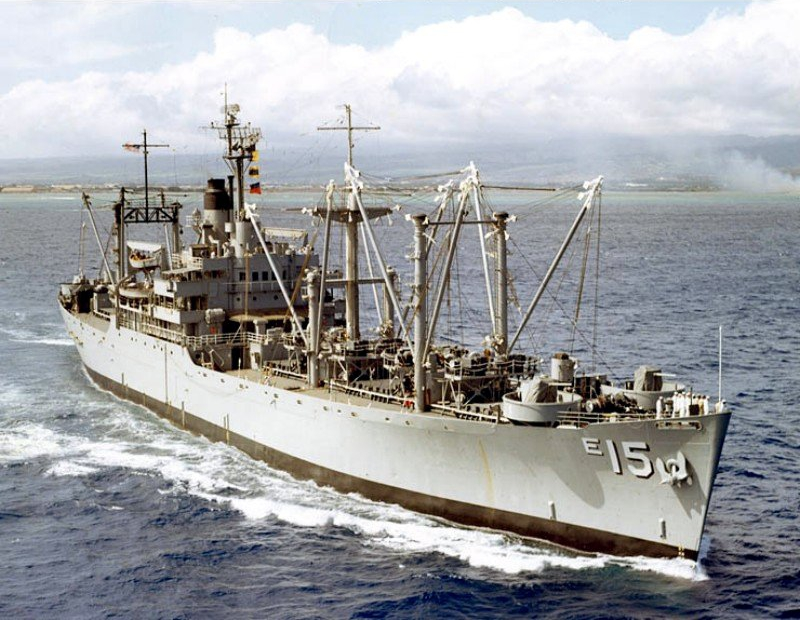
USS Vesuvius (AE-15)

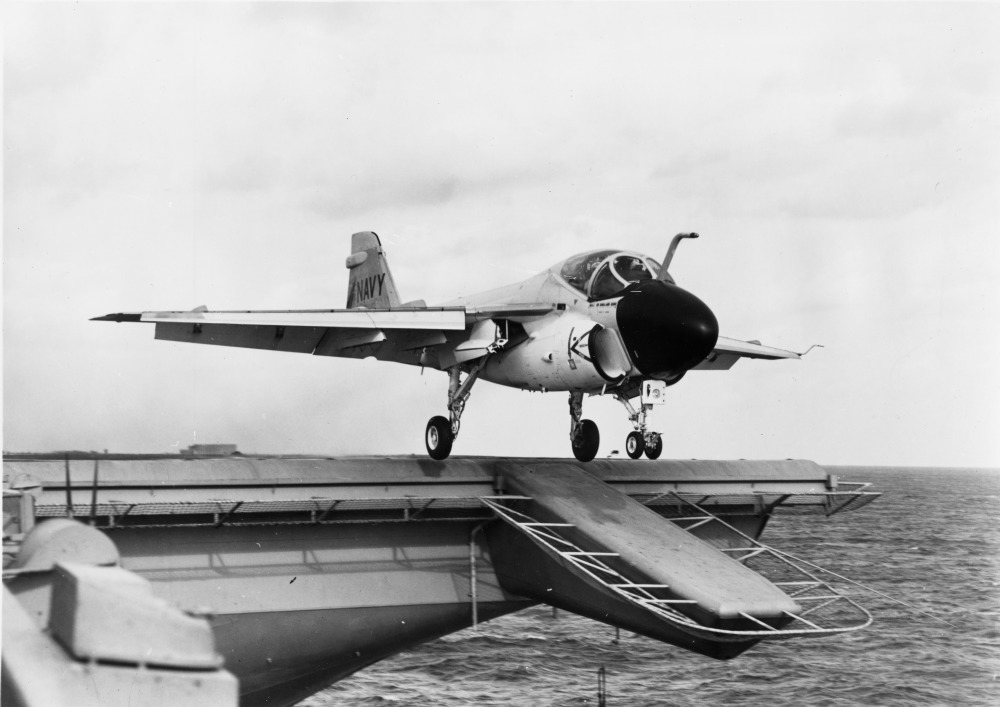
A-6A onboard USS Enterprise (1962)

The air-strike contingencies under consideration required sufficient ordnance to support such operations. Currently available ammunition reserves for the U.S. Navy totaled some 2,800 long tons (2,800 metric tons) stored in Japan, and planners estimated that potentially an additional 11,400 long tons (11,600 metric tons) of naval ordnance were needed for Task Force 71. Accordingly, the U.S. Navy's Military Sea Transportation Service (MSTS) diverted the chartered cargo ship Clearwater Victory to the U.S. naval base at Sasebo, Japan, for the Navy ammo supply depot there. From Sasebo, the ammunition ship Vesuvius (pictured) would distribute the munitions to Task Force 71 operating at Point Defender off the east coast of North Korea in the Sea of Japan. All additional stocks of munitions for the Navy and the Air Force were completely available by 10 February 1968.

The two-carrier strike group for Task Force 71 consisted of the Enterprise and Ranger with their embarked carrier air wings, Carrier Air Wing Nine and Carrier Air Wing Two respectively. Initially, the principal naval aircraft for any air strikes against North Korea were the 12 Grumman A-6A Intruder attack aircraft (pictured) embarked on board the Enterprise as part of Attack Squadron 35 under the command of Commander Glenn E. Kollmann. (Note: Commander Kollmann was killed in an operational accident on 12 March 1968 and replaced by Commander Herman L. Turk.) By 1 February 1968, Task Force 71 gained an additional 10 A-6 aircraft embarked on board the Ranger as part of Attack Squadron 165 under the command of Commander William S. Jett III.

The A-6 was an all-weather medium-size attack bomber that was capable of carrying up to 18,000 pounds (8,200 kilograms) of ordnance, both conventional and nuclear, in one centerline and four wing strongpoints. What set the A-6 apart was its inter-connected digital system used for its bombing missions which prompted the official U.S. Navy history of Operation Rolling Thunder to note:

A key feature of the early Intruders was the digital integrated attack system (DIANE) that combined search and track radars; navigation, communications, and identication equipment; a cockpit display system; and a high-speed digital computer. DIANE enabled the pilot to preselect a target, guide the aircraft, release the weapons, and leave the target area automatically. From the time an Intruder catapulted from a carrier's flight deck to its return from a mission over Vietnam the pilot had no need for visual references.

Other TF-71 strike aircraft included 32 Douglas A-4 Skyhawk and 28 LTV A-7 Corsair II sub-sonic light attack aircraft supported by 57 McDonnell Douglas F-4 Phantom II supersonic fighter-bombers and 15 converted Douglas A-3 Skywarrior heavy attack aircraft serving as aerial tankers and electronic warfare platforms. Additionally, six (6) converted North American A-5 Vigilante supersonic attack bombers provided reconnaissance support while 8 Northrop Grumman E-2 Hawkeye aircraft provided all-weather airborne early warning (AEW) support.

Finally, a nuclear option codenamed Freedom Drop was also considered as a potential contingency. This option involved the use of nuclear-armed American tactical aircraft and land-based MGR-1 Honest John and MGM-29 Sergeant tactical missiles against attacking North Korean troops and tanks. Nuclear warheads with yields up to 70 kilotons would be used against a handful of military targets or "all significant North Korean offensive and logistic support targets." With the exception of the F-4 Phantom II, all TF-71 strike aircraft were capable of both nuclear and non-nuclear missions. (Note: Freedom Drop was also an option considered by the Nixon administration in response to the shooting down of the U.S. Navy's EC-121 electronic reconnaissance aircraft in 1969 by North Korea. See Document 12 (Tab L and Document 16 (Item 13 redacted) cited in National Security Archive Electronic Briefing Book No. 322: How Do You Solve A Problem Like Korea? New Archive Document Collection Sheds Light on Nixon's Frustrating Search for Military Options by Robert Wampler, PhD, National Security Archive – George Washington University, dated June 23, 2010.)

Several factors that undoubtedly influenced the decision not to go ahead with air strikes against North Korea was that by 5 February 1968 a picket line of Soviet warships had formed along the 38th parallel North that could provide advanced warning to North Korea of any carrier aircraft being launched by Task Force 71. Likewise the Soviet intelligence-gathering vessel Gidrofon was directly monitoring Task Force 71 operations in the Sea of Japan and could also provide advanced warning of any carrier air strikes. Finally, winter weather conditions affected flight operations:

Bitter winter weather plagued the ships and their men throughout the confrontation. Slightly modified continental polar air dominated the weather over the Sea of Japan into February. Rain and snow showers repeatedly pounded the region during the mornings, followed by partly cloudy skies into the afternoons and clouds overnight. Snow fell onto Enterprise's flight deck and slush sometimes gathered to a thickness of a half inch, and the wind chill repeatedly fell below freezing.

==== Special operations ====
At the United Nations Command in South Korea, General Charles H. Bonesteel III recommended that American and South Korean ground forces engage in secret hit-and-run attacks against North Korea. The GUPPY IIA diesel-electric submarine Ronquil was specifically tasked for cover and search-and rescue operations during the Pueblo crisis that conceivably could have included special operation missions. (Note: An online article dated June 27, 2019 speculated that the submarine USS Segundo (SS-398) may have been tasked for special operations during Operation Formation Star, but does not provide any independent, verifiable documentation to this claim.)

==== Mining, naval blockade, and maritime interdiction ====
Consideration was given to mining nine North Korean seaports, with four harbors mined from the air while the other five would by mined from the air and submarines. CINCPAC assured the Joint Chiefs of Staff that the Seventh Fleet had sufficient mines available to carry out this mission while also having ample stocks in reserve for any potential mining operations against North Vietnam. For comparison, the inter-agency Korea Working Group determined that 17 sorties of A-6 aircraft from the carrier Enterprise would be needed to drop a total of naval mines just to close Wonsan harbor. (Note: By comparison, for 1972's Operation Pocket Money, it took three A-6A and six A-7E attack aircraft to drop 12 1,000-pound (450 kg) Mk-52 magnetic mines and 24 500-pound (230 kg) Mk-36 acoustic mine to close the North Vietnam's chief seaport of Haiphong. See Sherwood, John. Fast Movers: Jet Pilots and the Vietnam Experience (New York: Simon & Schuster, 2001), pp. 85-86.) Likewise, a naval blockade or the interception and seizure of North Korean merchant marine or fishing vessels on the high seas were also examined by the inter-agency Korea Working Group, and pursuant to either objective, the Central Intelligence Agency compiled a very detailed list of both DPRK-flagged ships either underway or in port, as well as noting foreign-flagged ships anchored in North Korean ports (see declassified, redacted document below). On 21 March 1968, the J-3 division of the Joint Staff submitted a follow-up report to the Joint Chiefs of Staff that stated sinking North Korean naval and merchant marine shipping likewise require attacking North Korean ports and harbor facilities to be effective and could result in a "high risk of reopening full-scale hostilities" across the Korean peninsula.

CIA Memorandum: Merchant Shipping in North Korean Ports and En Route dated 28 January 1968
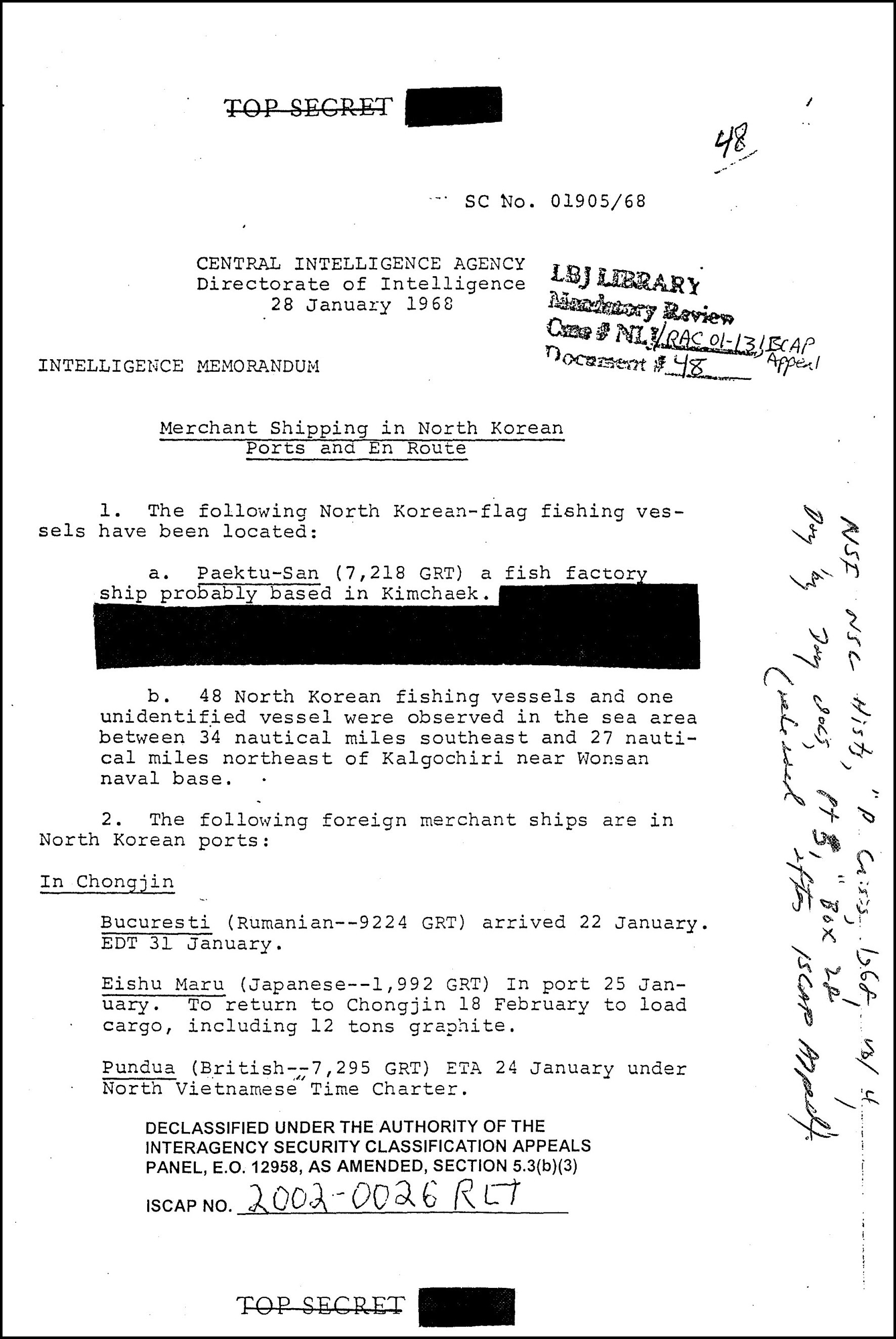
Page 1 of 3

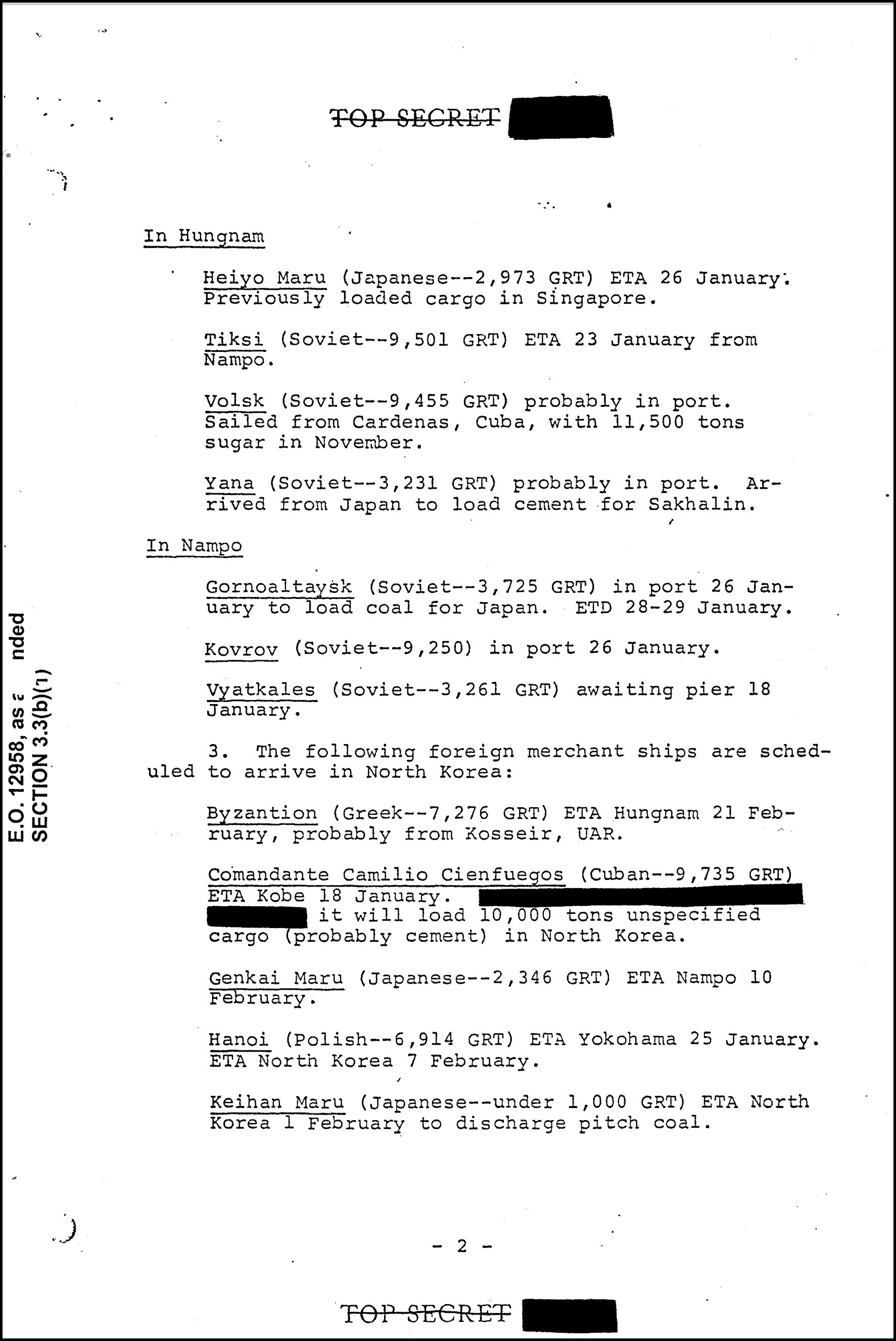
Page 2 of 3

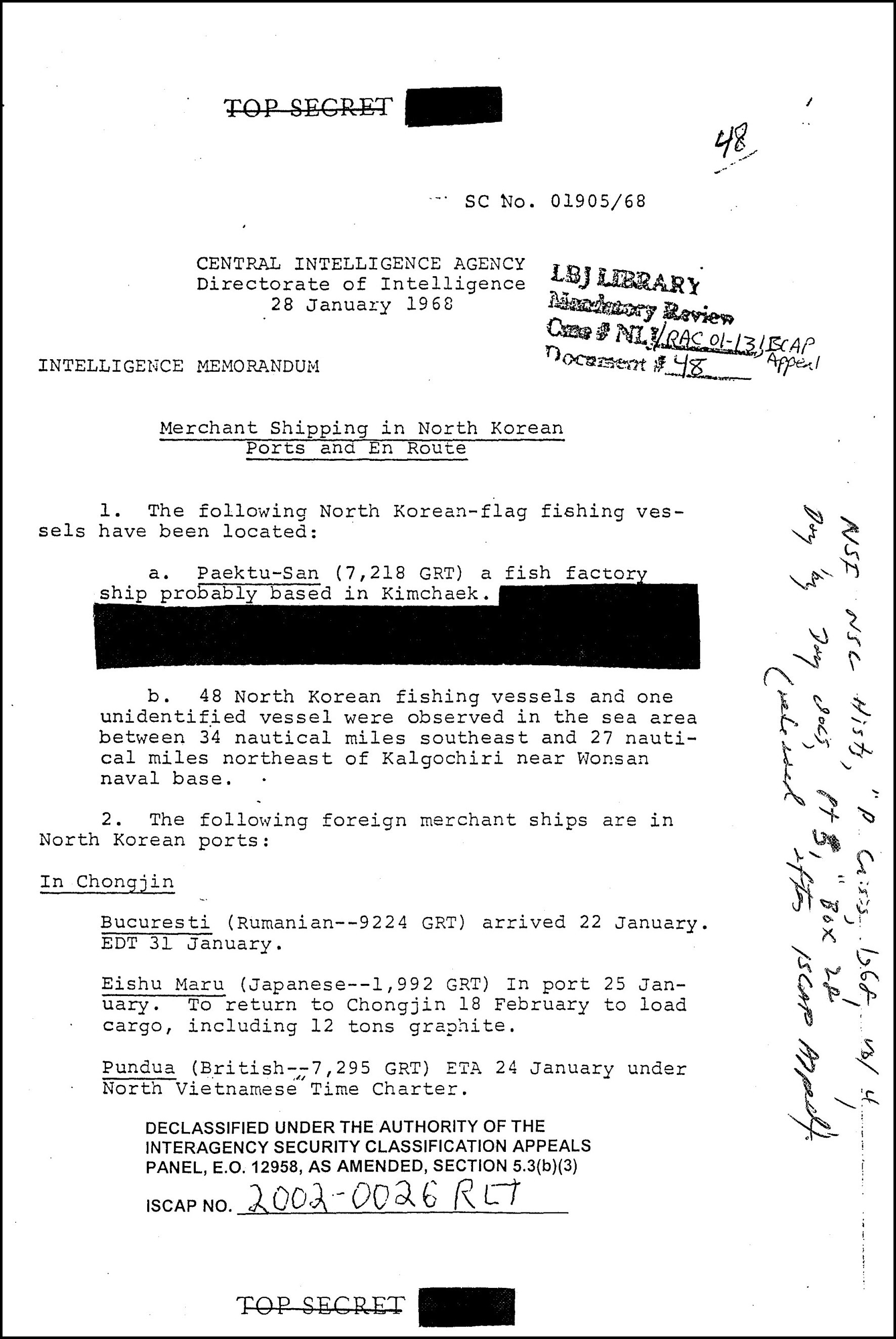
Page 3 of 3

=== Soviet reaction ===
==== Naval activity ====
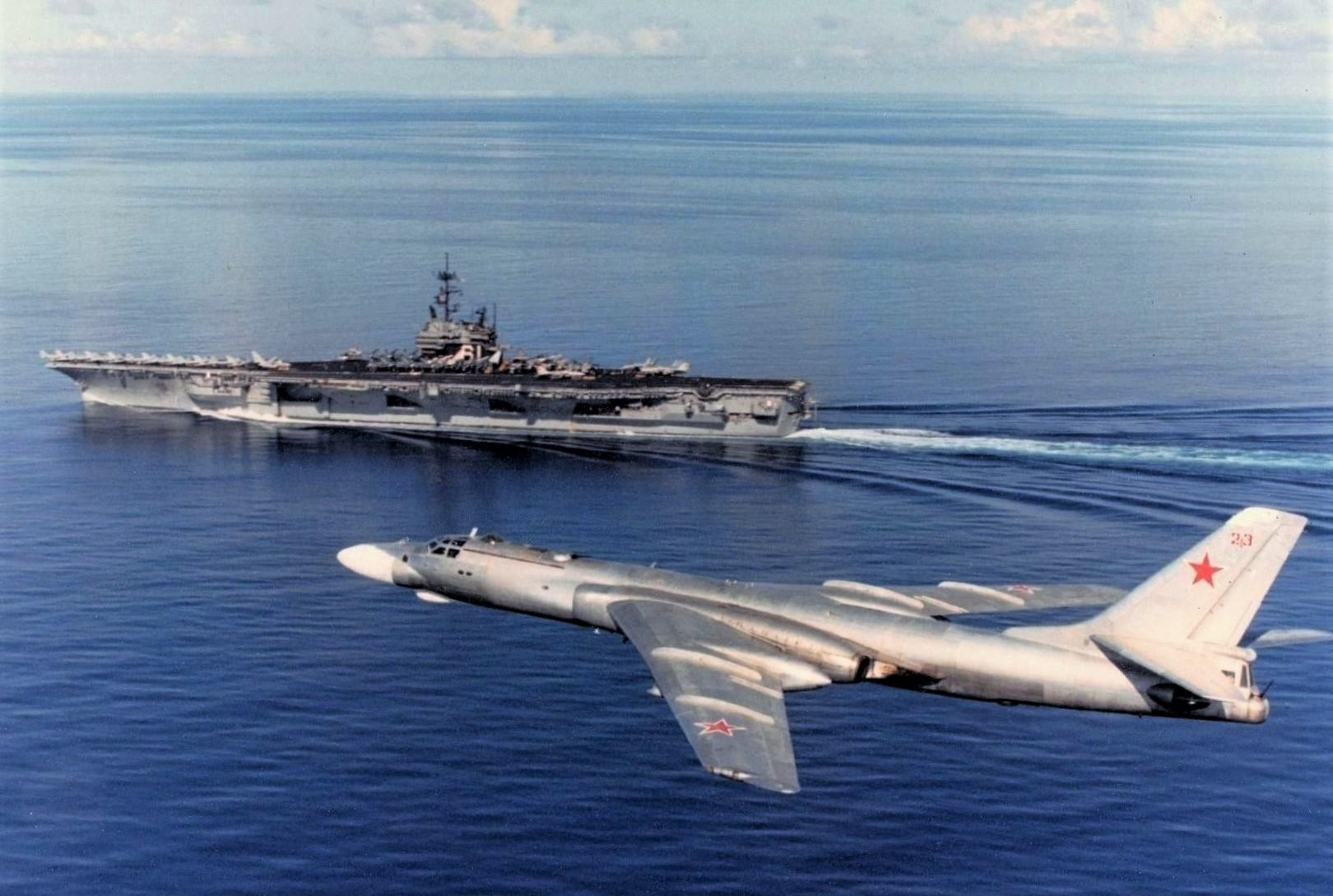
Tupolev Tu-16 fly-over of USS Ranger (1963)

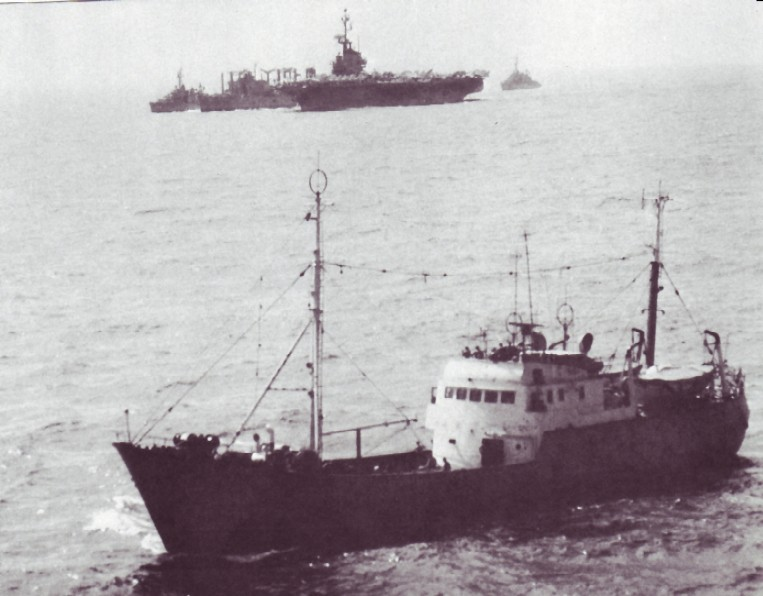
Soviet intelligence-gathering vessel Gidrofon in the Gulf of Tonkin (1969) with USS Coral Sea (CVA-43) in background

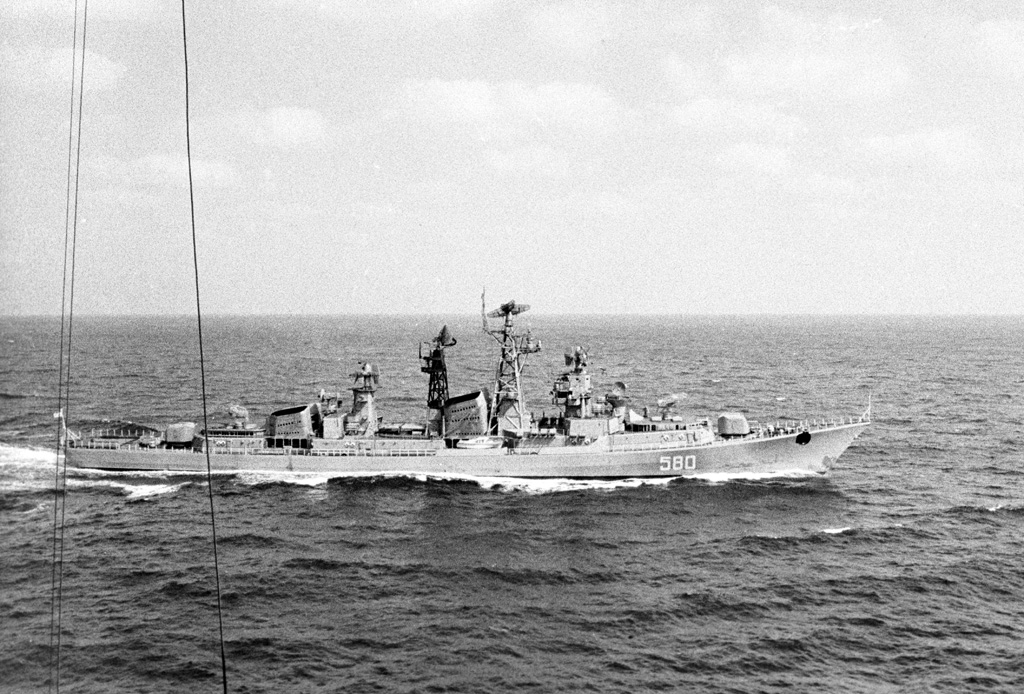
Kashin-class destroyer Steregushchy (Pennant No. 580), 1968

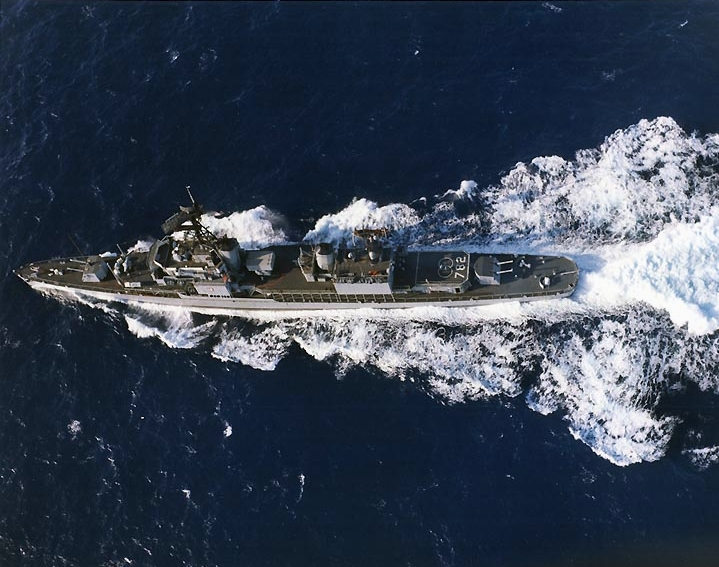
USS Rowan (1965)

Beginning in the mid-1950s, the United States Navy took note of the use of Soviet fishing trawlers as intelligence-gathering vessels operating near the United States. Often such trawlers interfered with the navigation of U.S. naval vessels, particularly surfaced submarines. Likewise, starting in early 1963, long-range land-based Soviet bombers began overflying U.S. aircraft carriers, often resulting in the disruption of flight operations (pictured). For example, on 23 January 1968, the Soviet intelligence-gathering vessel Gidrofon (pictured) repeatedly crossed the bow of the aircraft carrier Enterprise as it was departing the U.S. naval base at Sasebo, Japan, causing the carrier to stop and reverse engines in order to avoid a collision. This Soviet spy vessel subsequently monitored Task Force 71 operations in the Sea of Japan until 5 March 1968.

As the Pueblo crisis unfolded, the presence of such a large U.S. naval force in the Sea of Japan prompted the Soviet Union to deploy its own warships and naval aircraft to the area in response. The USSR's Red Banner Pacific Fleet initially deployed a Kildin-class destroyer, a Kotlin-class destroyer, a Riga-class frigate, two intelligence-gathering trawlers, four fleet tankers, and a water tender in response to the U.S. naval force in the Sea of Japan. Likewise, "considerable" naval activity by the Chinese Navy in the Yellow Sea was also duly noted.

On 25 January 1968, the Enterprise-led Task Group 70.6 sailed past the Riga-class frigate and Uda-class oiler patrolling the entrance of Tsushima Strait. Later that same day, a Kashin-class destroyer began trailing TG-70.6 in the Sea of Japan. A Kotlin-class destroyer subsequently joined in shadowing the now-activated Task Force 71. By 5 February 1968, a picket line of Soviet warships formed along the 38th parallel North that included two Kynda-class cruisers and three Kashin-class destroyers. Also, on that date, another six Soviet destroyers steamed into the Sea of Japan, as well as at least two Soviet submarines were also operating in Sea of Japan. Ultimately, the Soviet fleet commander, Admiral Nikolai Amelko, committed fully half of his cruiser-destroyer forces based in Vladivostok to monitor U.S. naval forces during the Pueblo crisis. Likewise, Pacific-based Soviet Naval Aviation maritime patrol bombers were also flying multiple daily missions to monitor Task Force 71. On 7 February 1968 alone, ten Tupolev Tu-16 Badger bombers approached U.S. naval forces at altitudes between 500 ft (150 m) and 30,000 ft (9,100 m).

As the surface and sub-surface surveillance operations coordinator (SSSC) for Task Force 71, the Yorktown and its embarked Carrier Anti-Submarine Air Group 55 (CVSG-55) provided near-continuous anti-submarine warfare (ASW) and anti-shipping air operations throughout February 1968, with the exception of a single period of nine hours when flight operations were suspended owing to inclement winter weather conditions. This air coverage included surveillance of Soviet naval activity in the Sea of Japan. After relieving Yorktown on 1 March 1968, the ASW support aircraft carrier Kearsarge and its embarked Carrier Anti-Submarine Air Group 53 (CVSG-53) monitored Soviet naval activity throughout the month of March. Soviet warships identified during that time period included a Sverdlov-class cruiser, a Krupny-class guided-missile destroyer, a Kashin-class guided-missile destroyer (pictured), a modified Kotlin-class destroyer, and two Riga-class frigates. (Note: From USS Kearsarge (CVS-33) DANFS entry: The Soviets continued to monitor the crisis carefully, and Kearsarge reported that she identified a wide variety of their vessels including a Sverdlov class cruiser (Pennant No. 824), Krupny class guided missile destroyer (Pennant No. 981—equipped with an SA-N-1 Goa twin surface-air-missile launcher), Kashin class guided missile frigate (580), modified Kotlin class (424), Riga class frigates (800 and 840), Pamir class intelligence gatherers Gidrograf and Peleng, Gidrolog, Protraktor, Uda class oiler Vishera, and oiler Konda.) Also during this period, Kearsarge monitored at least two Soviet-flagged and four non-Soviet merchant marine vessels transiting through the Sea of Japan. Kearsarge also provided search-and-rescue (SAR) support to Task Force 71.

Between 23 January and 21 February 1968, the U.S. Seventh Fleet reported 14 cases of harassment by Soviet naval vessels, with the most damaging occurring on 1 February 1968 when the U.S. destroyer Rowan (pictured) and the 10,000-dwt Soviet freighter Kapitan Vislobokov punched above-the-waterline holes in their hulls during a collision. This latter incident prompted a formal Soviet protest on 2 February 1968 and a counter-protest from the United States on 4 February. On 22 February 1968, Admiral John J. Hyland, Jr., transmitted a detailed U.S. Pacific Fleet communique to CINCPAC Admiral Ulysses S. Grant Sharp, Jr., detailing the increased number of at-sea incidents between Soviet and American naval vessels in the Sea of Japan. The Hyland communique cited 14 specific incidents, with "many of all deliberately intended" to be harassing U.S. naval operations.

On 1 March 1968, Admiral Sharp forwarded the Hyland communique to the U.S. Joint Chiefs of Staff. The JSC formed a panel to examine the subject and adopted the OPNAV position on negotiating a diplomatic agreement to reduce at-sea incidents with the USSR. On 16 April 1968, the U.S. Department of State requested that the Soviet Ministry of Foreign Affairs start discussion on "safety at sea" issues facing the two nuclear superpowers.

==== Diplomatic activity ====
Publicly, in addition to deploying Soviet naval forces to the Sea of Japan, on 3 February 1968, the Soviet government sent a letter to the President Lyndon B. Johnson demanding that the United States scale back its naval build-up off North Korea. Later, on 4 February 1968, in private negotiations at the Joint Security Area on the Korean Demilitarized Zone, DPRK Major General Pak Chung-kuku specifically demanded that the nuclear-powered aircraft carrier Enterprise be moved out of the Sea of Japan to his American counterpart, Rear Admiral John Victor Smith, in order to "eliminate the atmosphere of compulsion" being imposed upon North Korea. Likewise, on 4 February 1968, Korean Task Force chairman Samuel D. Berger recommended to President Johnson via Secretary of State Dean Rusk that moving the carrier Enterprise was the "simplest and safest gesture" at the start of negotiations with North Korea for the release of the Pueblo's crew.

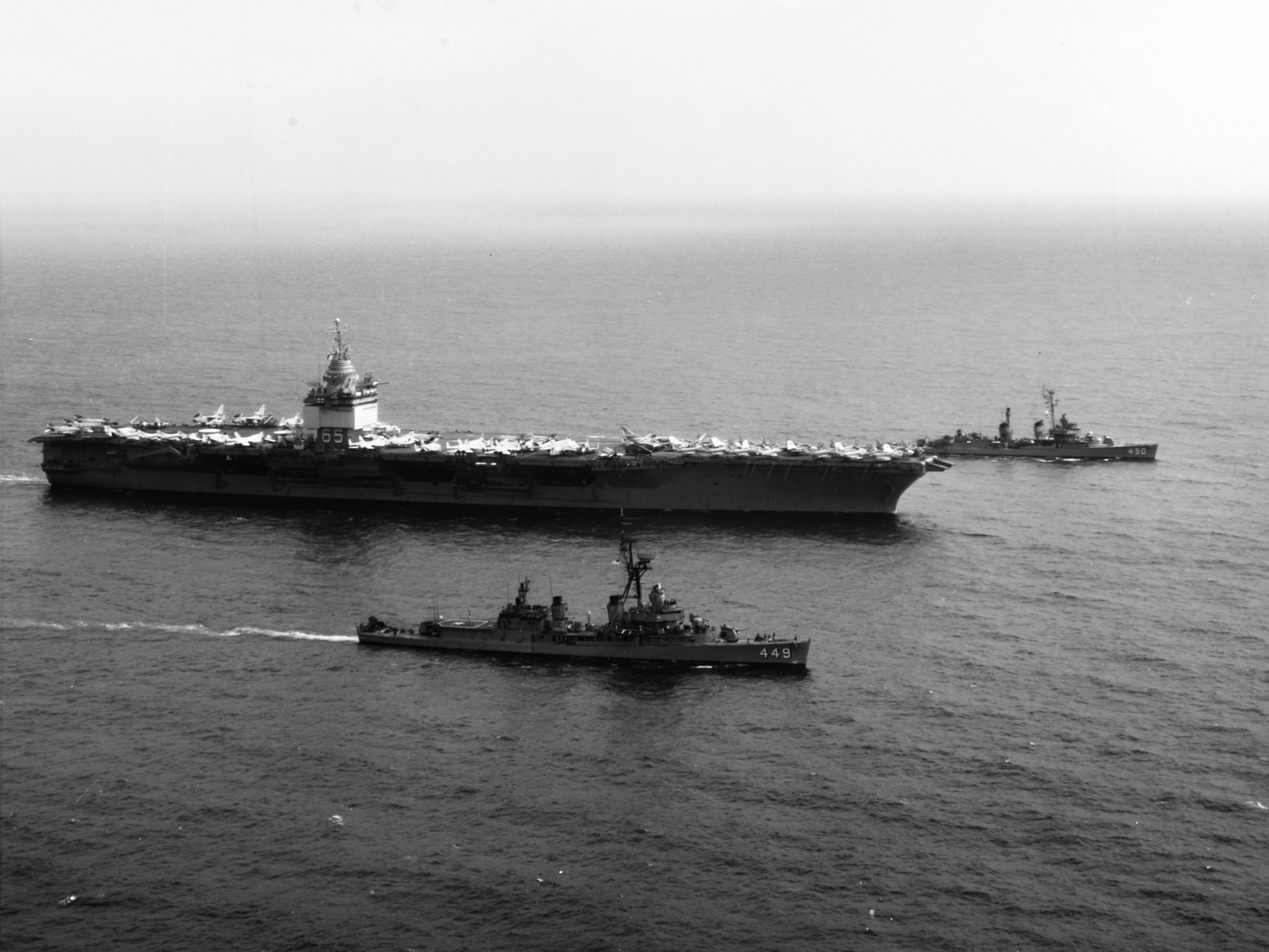
USS Enterprise at Yankee Station (March 6, 1968)

In his response to the Kosygin letter, on 5 February 1968, President Johnson stated that "on the assumption that . . . we (i.e., Washington and Moscow) want peace in that area and that we will both work to that end" and promised to move carrier task group "somewhat southward" as a goodwill gesture. President Johnson then personally ordered Captain Kent L. Lee to move the Enterprise south of its then-current position, passing through the Tsushima Strait while staying within 12 hours steaming distance from North Korea. This Kosygin-Johnson exchange enabled General Secretary Leonid Brezhnev to subsequently make a face-saving statement to the 23rd Congress of the Communist Party of the Soviet Union that the United States had responded to the Soviet letter by withdrawing the Enterprise.

This movement of the Enterprise drew a private rebuke by the President of South Korea Park Chung Hee to U.S. Ambassador William J. Porter on 8 February 1968. To ease the situation, the Joint Chiefs of Staff endorsed a $100 million (USD) increase in military assistance to South Korea for Fiscal Year 1968 that included 18 additional F-4D Phantom II fighters, 300,000 additional M–1 rifles for the recently formed Homeland Defense Reserve Force (HDRF), and a $13 million (USD) counter-infiltration package, all subsequently enacted by the United States Congress.

On 16 February 1968, Rear Admiral Horace H. Epes, Jr., transferred his flag to the attack aircraft carrier Ranger, and in response to the unfolding Tet Offensive, the Enterprise departed the Sea of Japan for duty with Task Force 77 at Yankee Station off North Vietnam (pictured).

=== Stand-down ===
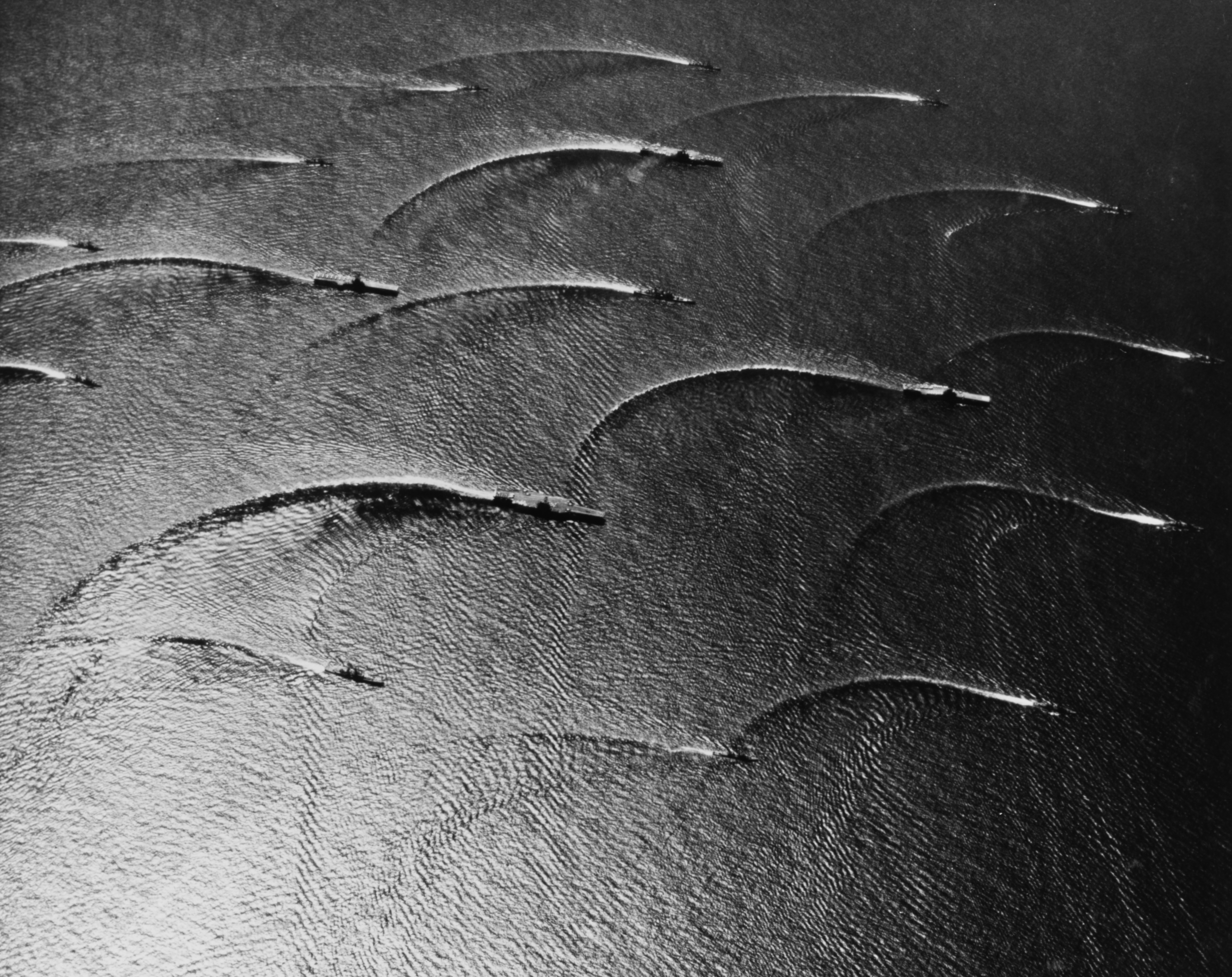
Task Force 77 (1965)

==== Operational considerations ====
Operation Formation Star placed a considerable strain on the United States Seventh Fleet's support for the Vietnam War, particularly aircraft carrier operations with Task Force 77 at Yankee Station in the Gulf of Tonkin (picture). Two days before the capture of the Pueblo, 21 January 1968, North Vietnamese Army began its siege against Khe Sanh Combat Base near the Vietnamese Demilitarized Zone (DMZ). Seven days after the Pueblo crisis started, the Viet Cong and North Vietnamese People's Army of Vietnam launched the Tet Offensive, a campaign of surprise attacks against military and civilian commands and control centers throughout South Vietnam. Concurrent with both events, Task Force 77's support of Operation Rolling Thunder was greatly hampered by poor weather conditions over North Vietnam.

At a briefing held 29 January 1968, Chief of Naval Operations Admiral Thomas H. Moorer advised the U.S. Joint Chiefs of Staff that Task Force 71 as constituted could operate for up to six weeks before the Seventh Fleet's carrier operations off Vietnam would start showing signs of degrading, necessitating a reduction in the operational tempo there. As an interim solution, a scheduled rest and recreation period for the attack aircraft carrier Kitty Hawk was cancelled in order to allow that carrier to stay at Yankee Station. Finally, the tour of duty for the attack carrier Coral Sea was extended by an additional month while extending the deployment of the attack carrier Oriskany was also considered.

==== Diplomatic considerations ====
With the Pueblo crisis evolving towards an eventual diplomatic conclusion, U.S. naval operations in the Sea of Japan began to wind down. Starting on 2 February 1968, the first of 29 "private" meetings between the American and North Korean representatives to the United Nations Command, Military Armistice Commission, Korea (UNCMAC) took place to start the negotiations for the release of the Pueblo's crew. By 4 March 1968, the inter-departmental Korea Task Force concluded that "available military action would be mere pin-pricks unlikely to move North Koreans, and would probably prejudice chances of getting men back." This viewpoint as not shared by the U.S. Ambassador to South Korea William J. Porter who in a 12 March 1968 cable to the U.S. Department of State stated that the "withdrawal [of] CVAs (i.e., attack aircraft carriers) will not advance matters at Panmunjom and might probably retard progress there" for a diplomatic resolution to the Pueblo crisis.

==== Redeployment ====
The Yorktown departed Defender Station for North Vietnam after being relieved by the Kearsarge on 1 March 1968. The Ranger was relieved by the attack aircraft carrier Coral Sea on 4 March 1968, allowing Ranger to return to air combat operations off North Vietnam starting 19 March 1968. Although not directly related to Operation Formation Star, on 5 March 1968, the Soviet intelligence-gathering vessel Gidrofon was relieved by the Dnepr-class intelligence-gathering vessel Protraktor of its monitoring of Task Force 71. Likewise, on 6 March 1968, Coral Sea's extended combat air patrol intercepted and escorted the only Tupolev Tu-16 Badger bomber to approach Task Force 71 during that carrier's deployment to Defender Station. Finally, on 22 March 1968, the remaining task groups led by the carriers Coral Sea, Kearsarge, and Ticonderoga departed Defender Station off the east coast of North Korea, formally ending Operation Formation Star. (Note: Coral Sea and Kearsarge returned to the United States while Ticonderoga rejoined Task Force 77 at Yankee Station off North Vietnam on 26 March 1968. See Francillon. Tonkin Gulf Yacht Club, pp. 104, 128, 164, 168.)

== Aftermath ==
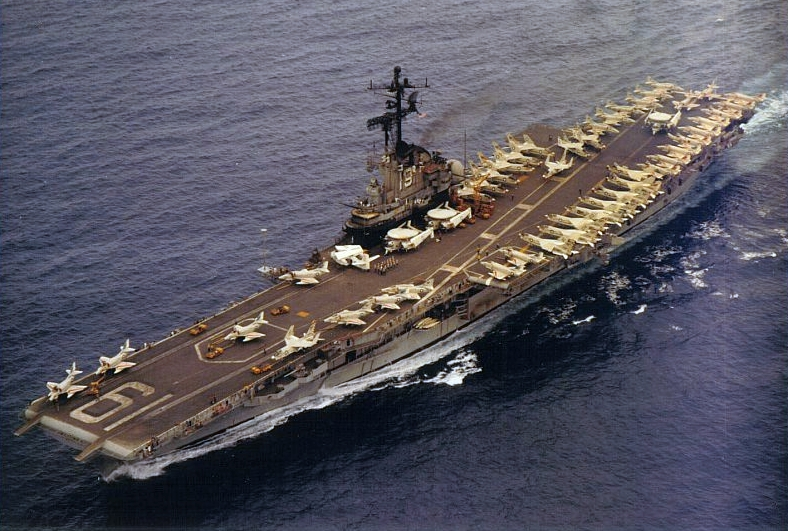
USS Hancock (CVA-19)

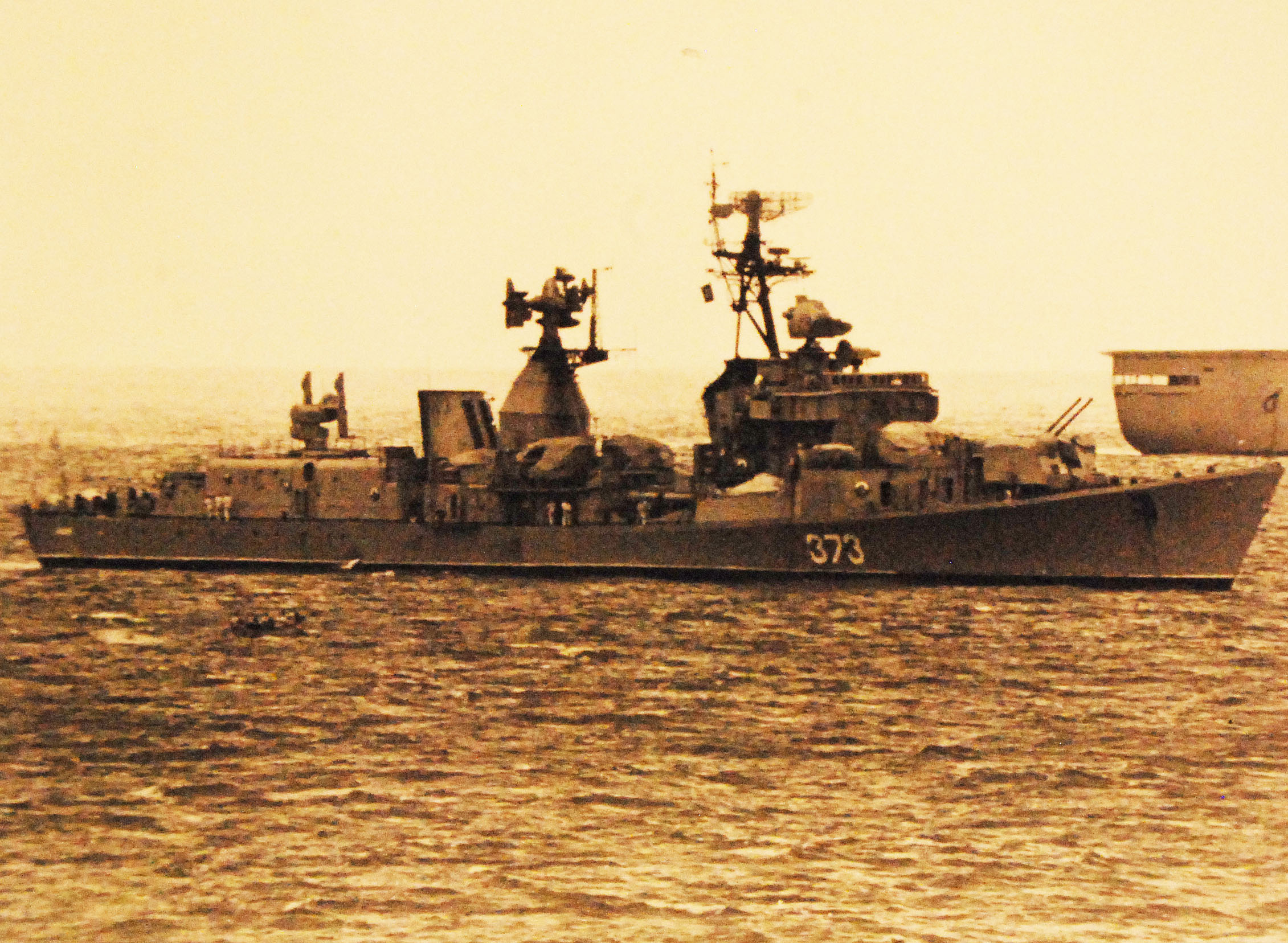
Bravyy

=== Pueblo negotiations ===
Although a wide range of military options were considered, the Johnson administration elected to resolve the Pueblo crisis diplomatically. However, the periodic rotation of U.S. aircraft carrier task forces to Defender Station off the North Korean coast provided additional leverage to American negotiators in talks to repatriate the crew of the Pueblo. For example, the early December 1968 deployment of the attack aircraft carrier Hancock (pictured) and its escorts to the Sea of Japan was timed to remind the North Korean government of the prospect of increased U.S. naval operations in the region following the bombing ceasefire over North Vietnam on 1 November 1968. This deployment of the Hancock task group was also prompted by the Uljin–Samcheok landings, the unsuccessful North Korean attempt to establish anti-government guerrilla camps in the Taebaek Mountains that took place on 30 October 1968.

Following an apology, a written admission by the United States that Pueblo had been spying, and an assurance that the U.S. would not spy on North Korea in the future, the North Korean government released the 82 remaining Pueblo crew members at the North Korean border with South Korea on 23 December 1968, just over 11 months after the Pueblo had been initially seized.

=== Naval Air Reserve reorganization ===
Although unrelated to Operation Formation Star, the six U.S. Naval Air Reserve (NAR) combat squadrons called up during the Pueblo crisis remained on active duty through September 1968. This Pueblo Incident reserve call-up revealed pervasive readiness and systemic short-comings within the NAR command infrastructure. This situation prompted sweeping reforms of the Naval Air Reserve to better reflect the operational and readiness requirements of the active-duty naval aviation arm of the United States Navy. In 1970, the NAR initiated a major re-organization that integrated existing NAR carrier-based combat squadrons into two reserve carrier air wings (CVWR-20 and CVWR-30) and two reserve anti-submarine carrier air wings (CVSGR-70 and CVSGR-80), as well as comparable re-grouping of existing land-based NAR patrol (VP) and transport (VR) squadrons.

=== INCSEA negotiations ===
Worldwide incidents between U.S. and Soviet naval vessels continued in the aftermath of the Pueblo crisis. Most notably, on 25 May 1968, the support aircraft carrier USS Essex (CVS-9) was underway in the Norwegian Sea when it was buzzed multiple times by a Soviet Tupolev Tu-16 heavy bomber. On the last pass, the plane's wing clipped the surface of the sea, and the aircraft disintegrated. The Essex launched rescue helicopters but none of the Tu-16 crew members survived the crash. Likewise, on 9 November 1970 off Crete, two Soviet sailors were killed when their Kotlin-class destroyer, the Bravyy (pictured), collided with the British aircraft carrier Ark Royal during Lime Jug training exercises in the eastern Mediterranean Sea.

Concluding a U.S.-Soviet Incidents at Sea agreement (INCSEA) became a top priority for the Nixon administration, with formal negotiations conducted in Moscow from October 12–22, 1971 and subsequently in Washington, D.C., between May 3–17, 1972. The final agreement was signed during the Moscow Summit on May 25, 1972, by United States Secretary of the Navy John Warner and the Soviet Navy's Commander-in-Chief, Admiral of the Fleet of the Soviet Union Sergey Gorshkov. The purpose of INCSEA was to reduce the chance of an incident at sea between the two countries, and in the event that an incident did occurred, to prevent that incident from escalating into a major confrontation.

== Legacy ==
Congressional report on Pueblo Incident (1969)

Contemporaneously, the immediate American military build-up generated by Operation Formation Star and Operation Combat Fox did achieve "a measured show of force" following the seizure of the USS Pueblo, prompting diplomatic engagement from the governments of North Korea and the Soviet Union. U.S. Ambassador William J. Porter was particularly supportive of carrier task forces operating at Defender Station in support of U.S. diplomatic efforts to resolve the Pueblo crisis. Consequently, over the balance of 1968, the periodic deployment of U.S. carrier task groups to Defender Station off the east coast of North Korea provided additional leverage to U.S. diplomatic efforts to gain the release of the Pueblo's crew from North Korean captivity. That said, the United States Navy's initial response to the Pueblo Incident drew a sharp Congressional rebuke in its 1969 inquiry (pictured) about the Pueblo incident.

From an historical perspective, the ultimate effectiveness of Operation Formation Star and Operation Combat Fox remains a matter of debate, with military historian Daniel P. Bolger noting that "the contingency deployments did their job" while naval analyst Norman Polmar characterized Task Force 71 as being a "meaningless assembly of U.S. warships in the Sea of Japan following the North Korean seizure of the U.S. spy ship Pueblo." Historian Robert A. Mobley summarized the impact of Operation Formation Star, Operation Combat Fox, and the call-up of state-side military reserves during the Pueblo Incident by noting:

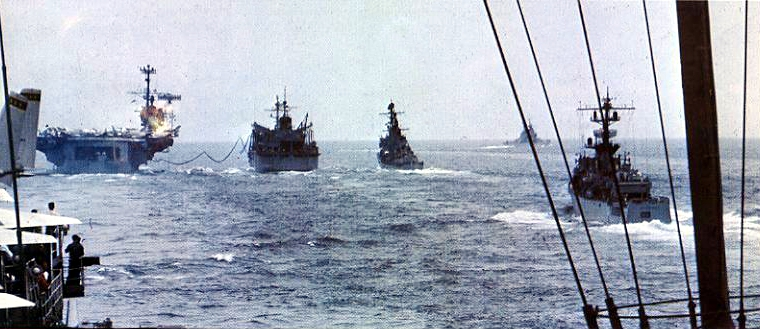
Task Force 71 (1969)

Thus the United States girded for war while seeking to avoid it. . . The United States, then, never abandoned the option of force, but the most visible and frenetic military efforts were over. In more ways than were then publicly apparent, the U.S. military had handled a daunting array of planning, deployment, and logistical tasks smoothly and in a remarkably short period. The incident remains painful to recall, even so long after the fact. The [archival] material now available, however, makes much clearer how military commanders and national decision makers responded to an unprecedented and challenging situation. Analogous problems would later arise in Tehran and Lebanon, when concern for American lives and the limitations of military force would compel U.S. leaders to use diplomatic means to free Americans held hostage. (Note: "Since 2010, the National Security Agency (NSA) has released more than 200 documents that provide new evidence and reinforce lessons for intelligence from North Korea's seizure in international waters of the USS Pueblo (AGER-2) in January 1968 and its subsequent shootdown in April 1969 of a Navy EC-121 signals intelligence (SIGINT) aircraft with 31 crewmen aboard." See Mobley, "Lessons from the Capture of the USS Pueblo and the Shootdown of a US Navy EC-121 — 1968 and 1969," p. 1.)

Less than four months after the release of the Puelbo's crew, Task Force 71 (pictured) was reconstituted following the 15 April 1969 shoot-down of an EC-121 reconnaissance aircraft in international airspace by the North Korean Air Force, with the nuclear-powered attack aircraft carrier USS Enterprise once again serving as its flagship.

== See also ==
- 1969 EC-121 shootdown incident
- FleetEx '83-1
- Korean DMZ Conflict
- Operation Combat Fox
- Operation Paul Bunyan

== Notes ==
Footnotes

Citations

== Sources ==
=== Secondary Sources ===
==== Books ====
- Cheevers, Jack (2013). Act of War: Lyndon Johnson, North Korea, and the Capture of the Spy Ship Pueblo (Paperback) (First ed.). New York: NAL Caliber. ISBN 978-0-451-46620-4.
- Francillon, René J. (1988). Tonkin Gulf Yacht Club: U.S. Carrier Operations off Vietnam (First ed.). Annapolis, Maryland: Naval Institute Press. ISBN 978-0-870-21696-1.
- Mobley, Richard A. (2003). Flash Point North Korea: The Pueblo and EC-121 Crises. Annapolis, Maryland: Naval Institute Press. ISBN 978-1-557-50403-6.
- Polmar, Norman (2008). Aircraft Carriers: A History of Carrier Aviation and Its Influence on World Events: Vol. II, 1946-2006. Dulles, Virginia: Potomac Books, Inc. ISBN 978-157488-665-8.
- Poole, Walter S. (2012). History of the Joint Chiefs of Staff, Volume IX: The Joint Chiefs of Staff and National Policy, 1965–1968 (PDF). Washington, DC: Office of Joint History, Office of the Chairman of the Joint Chiefs of Staff. ISBN 978-169952-917-1.
- Winkler, David F. (2017). Cold War at Sea: High-Seas Confrontation Between the United States and the Soviet Union (Second ed.). Annapolis, Maryland: Naval Institute Press. ISBN 978-1-682-47197-5.

==== Periodicals ====
- Bolger, Daniel P. (1991). "Scenes from an Unfinished War: Low intensity conflict in Korea 1966–1969" (PDF). Command Operations Reports. Fort Leavenworth: Leavenworth Papers #19. Archived from the original on 5 June 2020.
- Mobley, Richard (March 2015). "Lessons from the Capture of the USS Pueblo and the Shootdown of a US Navy EC-121——1968 and 1969" (PDF). Studies in Intelligence. 59 (1). Center for the Study of Intelligence: 1–10. Archived from the original (PDF) on 16 December 2016.
- —— (Spring 2001). "Pueblo: A Retrospective". Naval War College Review. 54 (2). Naval War College: 98–117.
- Newton, Robert E. (1992). "The Capture of the USS Pueblo and Its Effect on SIGINT Operations" (PDF). U.S. Cryptologic History, Special Series, Crisis Collection, Vol. 7, National Security Agency (NSA). Archived (PDF) from the original on 5 January 2019.

=== Primary Sources ===
==== National Security Archive - George Washington University ====
- National Security Archive Electronic Briefing Book No. 322: How Do You Solve A Problem Like Korea? New Archive Document Collection Sheds Light on Nixon's Frustrating Search for Military Options, edited by Robert Wampler, PhD, posted June 23, 2010.
  - "Document 12: Memorandum, Secretary of Defense Laird to NSA Kissinger, June 25, 1969, Subject: Review of US Contingency Plans for Washington Special Actions Group (FOIA)" (PDF).
  - "Document 16: Memorandum, Assistant Secretary of Defense Nutter to Secretary of Defense Laird, September 22, 1969, Subject: Korean Contingency Options (FOIA)" (PDF).
- National Security Archive Electronic Briefing Book No. 453 – USS Pueblo: LBJ Considered Nuclear Weapons, Naval Blockade, Ground Attacks in Response to 1968 North Korean Seizure of Navy Vessel, Documents Show, edited by John Prados and Jack Cheevers and posted January 23, 2014.
  - "Document 8: Central Intelligence Agency, Intelligence Report, "Merchant Shipping in North Korean Ports and En Route" dated January 28, 1968. Top Secret" (PDF).
  - "Document 17: Memorandum for the Chairman, Joint Chiefs of Staff, "Possible Responses to North Korean Attack on the Republic of Korea," May 14, 1968. Top Secret" (PDF).
  - "Document 23: Department of State report, "Pueblo Crisis: Presidential Decisions and Supplementary Chronology," December 12, 1968. Top Secret" (PDF).

==== Naval History and Heritage Command - Washington Navy Yard ====
===== Command Operations Reports (COR) =====
- Bennett, William L. (1968). "USS Yorktown (CVS-10) Command History for 1 January 1968 to 31 December 1968" (PDF).
- Ferris, James (1968). "USS Coral Sea (CVA-43) Command History for 1 January 1968 to 31 December 1968" (PDF). Archived from the original (PDF) on 22 March 2021.
- Gibson, Jr., R.B. (1969). "USS Volador (SS-490) Command History of 1968" (PDF).
- Lee, Kent (1968). "USS Enterprise (CVAN-65) Command History for 1 January 1968 to 31 December 1968" (PDF).
- McKenzie, William F. (1969). "USS Platt (AO-25) Command History of 1968" (PDF).
- Nearman, Leonard Maynard (1968). "Command History of USS Kearsarge: 1968" (PDF).

===== Dictionary of American Naval Aviation Squadrons (DANAS) =====
- Grossnick, Roy A. (1995). "Volume 1: The History of VA, VAH, VAK, VAL, VAP and VFA Squadrons, Chapter 2" (PDF).
- Roberts, Michael D. (2000). "Volume 2: The History of VP, VPB, VP(H) and VP(AM) Squadrons, Chapter 3" (PDF).

===== Dictionary of American Naval Fighting Ships (DANFS) =====
- "USS Chicago (CG-11)". Dictionary of American Naval Fighting Ships. Navy Department, Naval History & Heritage Command.
- "USS Enterprise (CVAN-65), 1966-1970". Dictionary of American Naval Fighting Ships. Navy Department, Naval History & Heritage Command.
- "Kearsarge III (CV-33) 1946–1973". Dictionary of American Naval Fighting Ships. Navy Department, Naval History & Heritage Command.
- "USS Platte (A0-25)". Dictionary of American Naval Fighting Ships. Navy Department, Naval History & Heritage Command.
- "USS Pueblo (AGER-2)". Dictionary of American Naval Fighting Ships. Navy Department, Naval History & Heritage Command.
- "USS Samuel Gompers (AD-37)". Dictionary of American Naval Fighting Ships. Navy Department, Naval History & Heritage Command.
- "USS Segundo (SS-398) 1943-1970". Dictionary of American Naval Fighting Ships. Navy Department, Naval History & Heritage Command.
- "Volador II (SS-490)". Dictionary of American Naval Fighting Ships. Navy Department, Naval History & Heritage Command.
- "USS Yorktown (CVS-10)". Dictionary of American Naval Fighting Ships. Navy Department, Naval History & Heritage Command.

===== H-Grams =====
- "H-014-1: The Seizure of USS Pueblo (AGER-2) 23 January 1968". Archived from the original (HMTL) on 1 June 2019.
- "H-025-3: The Release of the Crew of USS Pueblo (AGER-2), 23 December 1968" (HMTL).
- "H-029-2: The EC-121 "Deep Sea 129" Shootdown". Archived from the original (HMTL) on 1 May 2019.
- "H-029-3: A Brief History of U.S. Navy Cold War Aviation Incidents (Excluding Korea and Vietnam)" (HMTL).

===== Naval Aeronautical Organization (NAO) =====
- "Naval Aeronautical Organization OPNAV NOTICE 05400 for Fiscal Year 1968 dated 1 January 1968" (PDF).

==== U.S. Department of State, Office of the Historian – Foreign Service Institute (FIS) ====
- "Document 226: Notes on the President's Thursday Night Meeting on the Pueblo Incident, 6:30–7:45 p.m. (Washington, DC)" (PDF). Foreign Relations of the United States, 1964–1968, Volume XXIX, Part 1, Korea. 25 January 1968.
- "Document 264: Memorandum From the Director of the Korean Task Force (Berger) to Secretary of State Rusk" (PDF). Foreign Relations of the United States, 1964–1968, Volume XXIX, Part 1, Korea. 4 February 1968.
