= Hobson Plan =

1948 US Air Force organizational system

The Hobson Plan was an organizational structure established by the United States Air Force (USAF) in 1948, following experimental organization in 1947. Known as the "Wing-Base Organization," it replaced the organization used by the United States Army Air Forces (AAF), the predecessor organization of the USAF, which used separate chains of command for combat and support units. The plan made the wing the basic combat unit of the AAF, rather than the group and placed all support elements on a base under the command of the wing commander in addition to combat elements.

== Background ==
=== United States Army Air Forces ===
As part of the United States Army, the operational units of the United States Army Air Forces (AAF) operated from facilities known as army air fields. They consisted of a ground station, which consisted of streets, buildings, barracks and the support facilities and organizations. The airfield consisted of the runways, taxiways, hangars, and other facilities used to support flight operations at the airfield. The station commander commanded the station organizations and was responsible for the facilities. From 1940 to 1942, this responsibility fell to the commander of an "Air Base Group", consisting of an air base squadron and one or two materiel squadrons. There were also attached quartermaster and ordnance units, as well as other "Arms and Services with the Army Air Forces" detachments. Although these units supported one or two combat groups, they reported to different headquarters. In 1942, the air base groups became "service groups" designed to support deployed combat groups, while in the United States, the air base squadrons were expanded into "base headquarters and air base squadrons" and assumed the responsibilities of the former air base groups. In a reorganization of units in the United States by Army Air Forces, in the spring of 1944 the support units were reorganized into "Army Air Force Base Units" (AAFBU).

=== Creation of the United States Air Force ===
On September 16, 1947, the United States Air Force was established as a separate and equal element of the United States armed forces.

Rapid demobilization after September 1945 meant that a new Air Force had to be built with the remnants of the wartime Army Air Forces. Initially, the Army Air Fields retained as permanent bases were assumed by the USAF were renamed as "Air Force Bases", and the Army's organizational structure was carried over into the new service with "Air Force Base Units" replacing the AAFBU. This resulted, however, into an awkward circumstance where the Combat Group commander was reporting to a Base Commander who may or may not have had flying experience. Once the United States Air Force became operational as a separate department, Carl Andrew Spaatz, the first Chief of Staff of the United States Air Force established a policy where, "No tactical commander should be subordinate to the station commander."

Spaatz's policy meant that a new solution would have to be found. Major General Charles Born proposed the creation of the Provisional Wing Plan, which basically reversed the USAAF organization and placed the wing commander over the base commander, although this idea was eventually discarded as it was viewed to be too complex.

== The Wing-Base plan ==
Under the "Wing-Base" plan, the operational combat squadrons were assigned to a combat group. The support squadrons on the station were assigned to a "Maintenance and Supply Group", an "Airdrome Group", and a "Station Medical Group." The four groups were assigned to a wing, a changed level of command which unified all of the components, flying and support under a single command. The group commanders were subordinate to the wing commander who was an experienced combat flying leader. The wing would assume the historical numerical designation of the assigned combat group. A base commander was established to handle the administrative duties of the wing commander and to coordinate with the various group commanders. In this plan, known as the "Hobson Plan," the support groups and the operational flying combat group and the wing became one unit. Colonel Kenneth B. Hobson, the chief of the AAF Organizational Division, was the special project chairman and briefer. The Wing-Base Organization was formalized in Air Force Regulation 20–15, Organization Principles and Policies for the US Air Force.

Organizations known as "wings" had existed in the Air Force and its predecessors since 1918, and new wings were created in the 1920s and 1930s. During World War II numerous wings existed; some provided training in the United States, others controlled combat groups and support organizations overseas. However, the USAF wings established in 1947 were new organizations and few shared lineage or honors with the wings formed under the Army. In 1948 and afterward, some existing AAF wings were redesignated as air divisions, and placed immediately above the USAF Wings and below the Numbered Air Forces in the USAF organizational pyramid.

Another major change implemented by the Hobson Plan was the standardization of designations. For example, the 1st Fighter Wing, established at March Air Force Base would consist of the 1st Fighter Group (its combat group); the 1st Maintenance and Supply Group, the 1st Air Base Group (to operate base facilities and services), and the 1st Station Medical Group. Subordinate to the groups were the 1st Maintenance Squadron, 1st Supply Squadron, 1st Motor Vehicle Squadron, 1st Air Police Squadron, and so on. Operational flying Squadrons retained their historical designations and were assigned to the combat group. Tenant units stationed at the base, under the command of other commands, would also retain their designations.

=== 1947 Service Test ===
The service test of the Hobson Plan in 1947-1948 prompted an important change in the field structure and organization of the Air Force. The AAF (and previous Army Air Corps) wing organizations supervised a mixture of combat groups and support organizations. None of the subordinate organizations were permanently affiliated with the wings, or possessed similar numerical designations or standard functions.

The USAF wings organized for the service test of the Hobson Plan featured standard functions. Each wing had its support squadrons organized into the four prescribed groups, all with identical numerical designations.

Typical Service Test Organization

- 1st Fighter Wing

1st Fighter Group

27th Fighter Squadron
71st Fighter Squadron
94th Fighter Squadron

1st Airdrome Group

Squadron A, 1st Airdrome Group
Squadron B, 1st Airdrome Group
Squadron C, 1st Airdrome Group
Squadron D, 1st Airdrome Group
Squadron E, 1st Airdrome Group

1st Maintenance & Supply Group

Maintenance Squadron, 1st Maintenance & Supply Group
Supply Squadron, 1st Maintenance & Supply Group

1st Station Medical Group

The temporary service test Combat Wings were:

Wing Designation	Experimental Wing Organized	Experimental Wing Discontinued	Permanent Wing Activated
1st Fighter Wing	15 August 1947	24 August 1948	22 August 1948
2d Bombardment Wing	5 November 1947	12 July 1948	12 July 1948
4th Fighter Wing	15 August 1947	1 August 1948	1 August 1948
7th Bombardment Wing	17 November 1947	1 August 1948	1 August 1948
10th Reconnaissance Wing	3 December 1947	27 Aug 1948	25 August 1948 (Note: The permanent wing was redesignated the 10th Tactical Reconnaissance Wing)
14th Fighter Wing	15 August 1947	26 July 1948	26 July 1948
20th Fighter Wing	15 August 1947	26 August 1948	24 August 1948
27th Fighter Wing	15 August 1947	1 August 1948	1 August 1948
28th Bombardment Wing	15 August 1947	12 July 1948	12 July 1948
31st Fighter Wing	20 November 1947	25 August 1948	23 August 1948
33d Fighter Wing	5 November 1947	1 August 1948	1 August 1948
43d Bombardment Wing	17 November 1947	1 August 1948	1 August 1948
47th Bombardment Wing	15 August 1947	24 August 1948	22 August 1948
56th Fighter Wing	15 August 1947	1 August 1948	1 August 1948
62d Troop Carrier Wing	15 August 1947	24 August 1948	22 August 1948
67th Reconnaissance Wing	25 November 1947	24 August 1948	22 August 1948 (Note: The permanent wing was redesignated 67th Tactical Reconnaissance Wing)
82d Fighter Wing	15 August 1947	1 August 1948	1 August 1948
92d Bombardment Wing	17 November 1947	12 July 1948	12 July 1948
93d Bombardment Wing	15 August 1947	12 July 1948	12 July 1948
97th Bombardment Wing	1 December 1947	12 July 1948	12 July 1948
98th Bombardment Wing	10 November 1947	12 July 1948	12 July 1948
301st Bombardment Wing	5 November 1947	1 August 1948	1 August 1948
307th Bombardment Wing	15 August 1947	12 July 1948	12 July 1948
313th Troop Carrier Wing	15 August 1947	26 August 1948	23 August 1948
316th Troop Carrier Wing	15 August 1947	25 August 1948	23 August 1948
332d Fighter Wing	15 August 1947	28 August 1948	26 August 1948
363d Reconnaissance Wing	15 August 1947	27 Aug 1948	27 Aug 1948 (Note: The permanent wing was redesignated 363d Tactical Reconnaissance Wing)
509th Bombardment Wing	17 November 1947	1 August 1948	1 August 1948

=== Additional combat wings organized under the permanent plan ===
In the spring of 1948, the Hobson Plan was judged to be successful, and all other combat wings (mostly stationed overseas) were reorganized and established and the Hobson Plan was made permanent.

Typical Permanent Organization

- 1st Fighter Wing

1st Fighter Group

27th Fighter Squadron
71st Fighter Squadron
94th Fighter Squadron

1st Air Base Group

1st Air Police Squadron
1st Base Services Squadron (disbanded and function merged into Air Base Group headquarters in 1949)
1st Communications Squadron
1st Food Services Squadron
1st Installations Squadron
1st Motor Vehicle Squadron (transferred to Maintenance & Supply Group in 1949)
1st Finance Disbursing Unit (disbanded and function merged into Air Base Group headquarters in 1949)

1st Maintenance & Supply Group

1st Maintenance Squadron
1st Supply Squadron

1st Station Medical Group (renamed 1st Medical Group in 1949)

The wings organized under the permanent wing-base plan were:

Wing Designation	Wing Organized	Major Command
3d Bombardment Wing	18 August 1948	Far East Air Forces
8th Fighter Wing	18 August 1948	Far East Air Forces
18th Fighter Wing	14 August 1948	Far East Air Forces
19th Bombardment Wing	17 August 1948	Far East Air Forces
22d Bombardment Wing	1 August 1948	Strategic Air Command
23d Fighter Wing	16 August 1948	Far East Air Forces
32d Composite Wing	24 August 1948	Far East Air Forces
35th Fighter Wing	18 August 1948	Far East Air Forces
36th Fighter Wing	2 July 1948	Caribbean Air Command
38th Bombardment Wing	18 August 1948	Far East Air Force
49th Fighter Wing	18 August 1948	Far East Air Forces
51st Fighter Wing	18 August 1948	Far East Air Forces
52d Fighter Wing	9 June 1948	Air Defense Command
55th Strategic Reconnaissance Wing	19 July 1948	Strategic Air Command
57th Fighter Wing	20 Apr 1948	Alaskan Air Command
60th Troop Carrier Wing	1 July 1948	United States Air Forces Europe
61st Troop Carrier Wing	1 July 1948	United States Air Forces Europe
71st Tactical Reconnaissance Wing	18 August 1948	Far East Air Forces
81st Fighter Wing	1 May 1948	Pacific Air Command
86th Fighter Wing	1 July 1948	United States Air Forces Europe
317th Troop Carrier Wing	18 August 1948	Far East Air Forces
325th Fighter Wing	9 June 1948	Air Defense Command
347th Fighter Wing	18 August 1948	Far East Air Forces
374th Troop Carrier Wing	17 August 1948	Far East Air Forces
475th Fighter Wing	18 August 1948	Far East Air Forces

== Major subsequent changes ==
Over the years, the Hobson Plan has changed and evolved, but its basic concept has remained the same in terms of the wing being the basic USAF combat unit.

=== Dual Deputy Organization ===
Strategic Air Command (SAC)'s mobilization for the Korean War highlighted that SAC's wing commanders focused on running their bases and not on overseeing actual combat preparations. To improve wing commanders' ability to focus on combat operations, the air base group commander became responsible for managing the base housekeeping functions. SAC began experimenting with its organizations in February 1951 and decided on a final organization, which was implemented in June 1952. In this model, the wing commander focused primarily on the combat units and the maintenance necessary to support combat aircraft by having the combat and maintenance squadrons report directly to the wing and eliminating the intermediate combat and maintenance & supply group structures.

The new organization was referred to as the "Dual Deputy" organization. The commander of the combat group was replaced by a wing "Deputy Commander for Operations," and the commander of the maintenance & supply group was replaced by a wing "Deputy Commander for Maintenance." There were only two deputy commanders. The air base group and the medical group remained, although, on SAC bases with two wings, they were assigned to an air division headquarters. Between 1956 and 1958, the Air Force's other combat commands adopted this structure, although the organization of maintenance squadrons varied.

Typical Dual Deputy Organization

- 2d Bombardment Wing

20th Bombardment Squadron
49th Bombardment Squadron
96th Bombardment Squadron
2nd Armament & Electronics Maintenance Squadron (later 2nd Avionics Maintenance Squadron)
2nd Field Maintenance Squadron
2nd Periodic Maintenance Squadron (later 2nd Organizational Maintenance Squadron)
2nd Air Base Group (later 2nd Combat Support Group)

2nd Air Police Squadron
2nd Operations Squadron
2nd Food Services Squadron
2nd Installations Squadron (later 2nd Civil Engineering Squadron)
2nd Motor Vehicle Squadron (later 2nd Transportation Squadron)
2nd Supply Squadron

2nd Medical Group (later 2nd Tactical Hospital)

This arrangement, however, raised honors and lineage issues, as the combat groups, all veterans of World War II combat operations, held collectively many honors. At the same time, the postwar wings possessed few, if any, honors. Both SAC and ADC wanted the history and honors of the combat groups retained. In 1954, after review by Headquarters USAF, it was decided to bestow the wings with the history, campaign credits, and decorations the group had earned during World War II. In "bestowing" group history and honors on wings, USAF directives did not specify any conditions or limitations except to advise, in letters authorizing such bestowals, that these bestowals were temporary.

During the Vietnam War, Tactical Air Command transferred flight line maintenance personnel to the deploying squadrons to Southeast Asia. Squadrons transferred to Pacific Air Forces retained this arrangement; however, in 1972, driven by budgetary considerations and the Vietnam drawdown, HQ USAF withdrew its approval for TAC's structural deviation and forced TAC to revert to the consolidated maintenance concept.

=== Tri-Deputy organization ===
In the mid-1970s, the United States Air Forces in Europe (USAFE) tested a tri-deputy wing organization that added a "Deputy Commander for Resources" (later, resource management) to the dual-deputy structure. The new deputy commander was responsible for supply, transportation and civil engineering squadrons. The deputy commander for maintenance remained responsible for the maintenance staff and maintenance squadrons. Viewed as giving the wing commander more direct control over the mission as well as focusing more attention on resource management during a period of serious budget constraints, HQ USAF approved the Tri-Deputy system for all major commands in 1975.

While maintenance remained consolidated under the DCM in the official Tri-Deputy structure, Tactical Air Command (TAC) reorganized the DCM internally into the Production Oriented Maintenance Organization (POMO) in 1978. Under POMO, an aircraft generation squadron was responsible for all flight line maintenance, with a specific aircraft maintenance unit attached to each operational squadron. aircraft maintenance units trained and deployed with operational squadrons but were part of an aircraft generation squadron. Intermediate level maintenance was divided between a component repair squadron and an equipment maintenance squadron.

POMO was eventually renamed Combat Oriented Maintenance Organization. This was the basic structure of the tactical air forces (TAC, USAFE, and Pacific Air Forces). SAC and Military Airlift Command (MAC) kept their aircraft maintenance in the previous structure with flight line maintenance consolidated in an organizational maintenance squadron. This was an efficient structure for them since they operated primarily from home station or relied on en route maintenance teams at established overseas locations when their aircraft were overseas. Squadron deployments were not routine, so the additional cost of separate AMUs was not worthwhile.

=== Objective Wing Organization ===
In the early 1990s with the declared end of the Cold War and the continued decline in military budgets, the Air Force restructured to meet changes in strategic requirements, decreasing personnel, and a smaller infrastructure. This major reorganization stressed elimination of unnecessary layers of authority, decentralization of decision-making, and consolidation of functions.

The USAF restored a wing organizational structure, called the "objective wing", similar to the original Hobson wing-base plan. The inactivated combat groups were redesignated as "Operations Groups" and reactivated. In addition to the combat squadrons, an operations support squadron was added. The inactivated maintenance and supply groups were reactivated as "Logistics Groups", controlling maintenance, supply, transportation, and a logistic support squadron. Remaining support units were assigned to former air base or combat support groups, now all named "Support Groups." Although there was no immediate change, existing hospitals and clinics were renamed "Medical Groups". In 1994, the Objective Medical Group Organization created separate squadrons under the medical groups for aerospace medicine, dental, medical operations and medical support.

In addition to the realignment of support and operational squadrons, the "Tactical", "Strategic" and other descriptors of unit designations were discontinued. For example, the 354th Tactical Fighter Wing became the 354th Fighter Wing; the 24th Composite Wing became the 24th Wing; 356th Tactical Fighter Squadron became the 356th Fighter Squadron, and so on. This returned many unit designations back to their 1947 names.

=== Combat Wing Organization ===
In 2002, the Objective Wing Organization was modified to address the changes in the Air Force with the development of air expeditionary units. This reorganization was titled the "Combat Wing Organization." The primary changes were related to the maintenance function of the wing. The former Logistics Group was redesignated as the Maintenance Group. The Operations Group structure did not change, although for organizations with maintenance personnel assigned to flying squadrons, those maintenance personnel transferred to the new Maintenance Group into new Aircraft Maintenance Squadrons, similar to the POMO/COMO maintenance organization that was in place in various commands between 1978 and 1991. The Logistics Group's Logistics Support Squadron's maintenance planning and control function was replaced by a Maintenance Operations Squadron. Additionally, the Supply Squadron, Transportation Squadron and remaining functions of the Logistics Support Squadron were consolidated into a single Logistics Readiness Squadron and moved from the former Logistics Group to the Support Group. Support groups were redesignated "Mission Support Groups". In airlift units, the Mission Support Group took assignment of the Aerial Port Squadron, which had been in the Operations Group.

From 2021 to 2022, Air Combat Command made further changes to the Combat Wing Organization, under the reused term, "Combat Oriented Maintenance Organization." This new COMO saw individual Aircraft Maintenance Units under Aircraft Maintenance Squadrons elevated to squadron status, and called "[Aircraft Type] Generation Squadrons" with the numeric designator coming from the flying squadron they supported. For example, the aircraft generation squadron supporting the 27th Fighter Squadron was designated the "27th Fighter Generation Squadron", and the aircraft generation squadron supporting the 71st Rescue Squadron was designated the "71st Rescue Generation Squadron."
