= 67th Fighter Squadron =

67th Fighter Squadron

- 67th Fighter Squadron F-15EX Eagle II in 2026
- Active: 1941–present
- Country: United States
- Branch: United States Air Force
- Role: Fighter
- Part of: Pacific Air Forces
- Garrison/HQ: Kadena Air Base
- Nickname: Fighting Cocks
- Mottos: "Bring It On, we'll keep coming"
- Engagements: World War II: Guadalcanal Campaign; Korean War; Vietnam War
- Decorations: Navy Presidential Unit Citation; Distinguished Unit Citation; Presidential Unit Citation; Air Force Outstanding Unit Award with Combat "V" Device; Air Force Outstanding Unit Award; Philippine Presidential Unit Citation; Republic of Korea Presidential Unit Citation; Republic of Vietnam Gallantry Cross with Palm

Commanders
- Notable commanders: Brig Gen Robbie Risner; Gregory S. Martin

Insignia
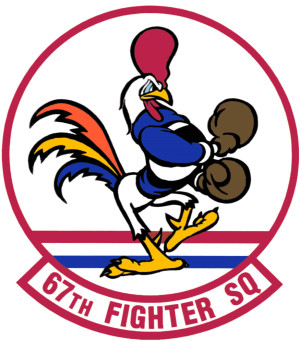
- 67th Fighter Squadron emblem (Approved 26 December 1995)

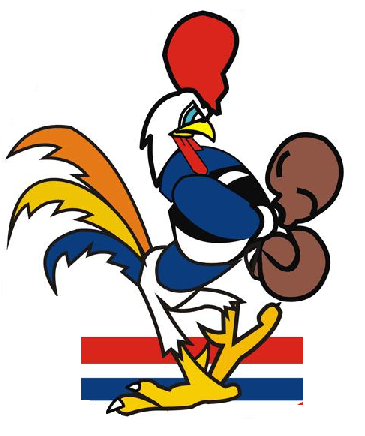
- 67th Fighter Squadron emblem (Approved 8 March 1945)

The 67th Fighter Squadron "Fighting Cocks" is a fighter squadron of the United States Air Force, part of the 18th Operations Group at Kadena Air Base, Japan. The 67th is equipped with the F-15EX Eagle II.

== Mission ==
The 67th Fighter Squadron is the only Boeing F-15EX squadron in the Asian-Western Pacific area of operations, supporting Pacific Command operational plans and headquarters-directed contingency operations.

== History ==
=== World War II ===
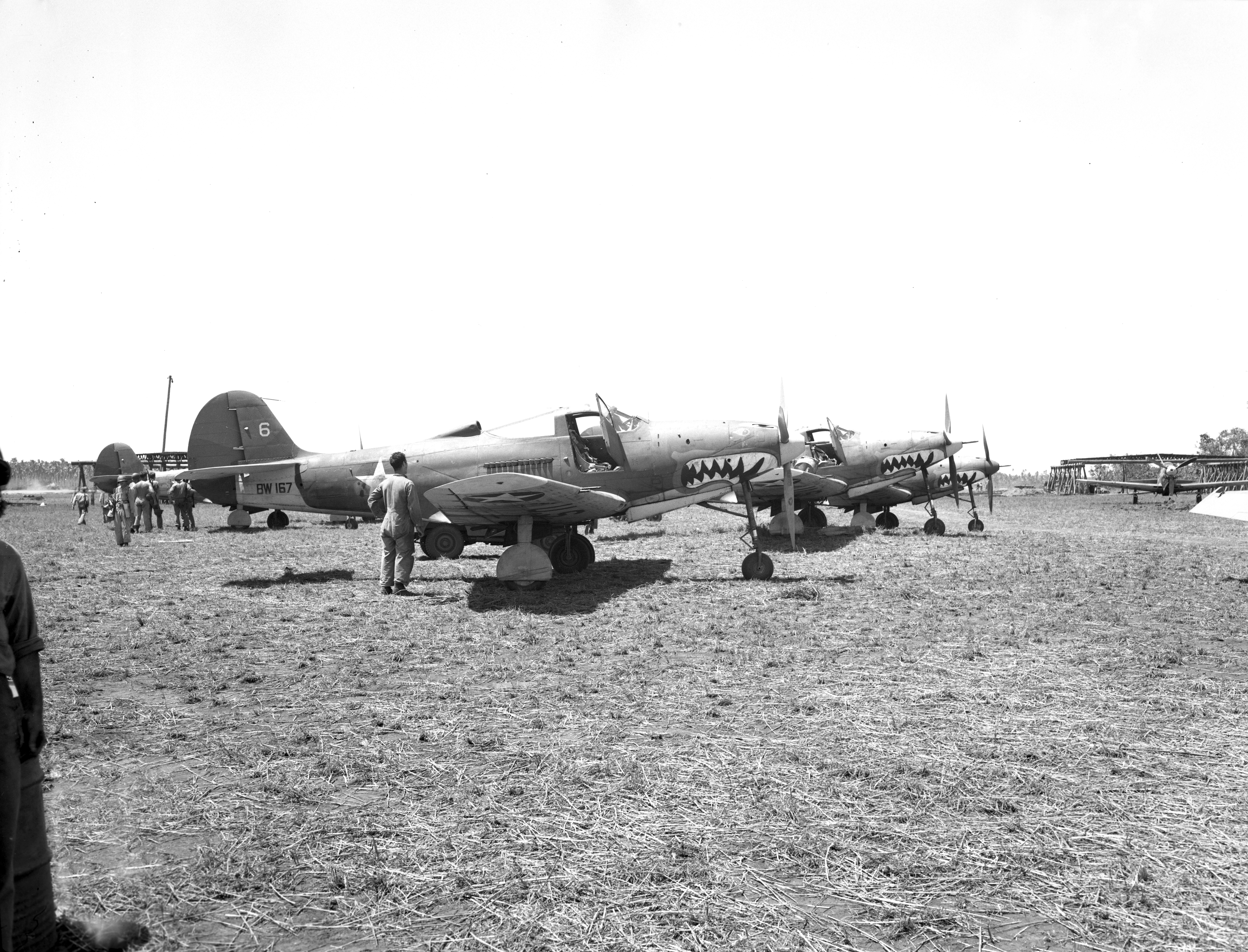
67th FS P-400s on Guadalcanal, August 1942.

Continually active since January 1941, the 67th was activated as a single-engine fighter operational and replacement training unit as part of the 58th Pursuit Group. 67th Pursuit Squadron, nicknamed the “Fighting Cocks,” stationed at Harding Army Airfield in Baton Rouge, Louisiana and was equipped with just a few obsolete Seversky P-35 fighters. On January 23, 1942, the Fighting Cocks embarked from Brooklyn, New York, for New Caledonia aboard the Army transport ship Thomas A. Barry. Another freighter carried 45 disassembled and crated P-400 aircraft and 2 P-39Fs. May 1, 1942 the Air Corps reorganized as the United States Army Air Forces. The 67th was renamed the 67th Fighter Squadron. August 21, the 67th Fighter Squadron, with five P-39/P-400 aircraft, joined Marine and Navy squadrons on Guadalcanal. Due to the limitations of the Aircraft the role of the 67th was limited to ground support and strafing Japanese positions. The Airacobra was very well suited to this role as exhibited during the Japanese assault of September 14, after which, General Vandegrift remarked, “You won't read about this in the newspapers, but you and your flight of P-400s just saved Guadalcanal."

Later that year the 67th was resupplied with new model P-39 Airacobras, fitted with proper oxygen systems. The 67 was moved to Kila KiIa Air Field in New Guinea in May 1943. Designated the 67 Fighter Squadron, Two Engine, on 24 May 1944 and equipped with P-38 aircraft.

Deployed to South Pacific Area, 1943, being assigned to the 347th Fighter Group, Thirteenth Air Force. Began combat operations in February 1944, providing protection for U.S. bases and escorting transports initially, then escorting bombers over New Guinea and sea convoys to Admiralty Islands. From Noemfoor, bombed and strafed Japanese airfields and installations on Ceram, Halmahera, and the Kai Islands.

Moved to the Philippines in November, flew fighter sweeps against enemy airfields, supported U.S. ground forces, and protected sea convoys and transport routes. Beginning in July 1945, attacked railways, airfields, and enemy installations in Korea and Kyushu, Japan from Okinawa.

After V-J Day, flew reconnaissance missions over Japan. Moved without personnel or equipment to the Philippines in December, aircraft sent to depots in the Philippines. Became part of the defense forces of Far East Air Forces in the postwar years at Clark Field, being deployed to Okinawa in 1949.

=== Korean War ===
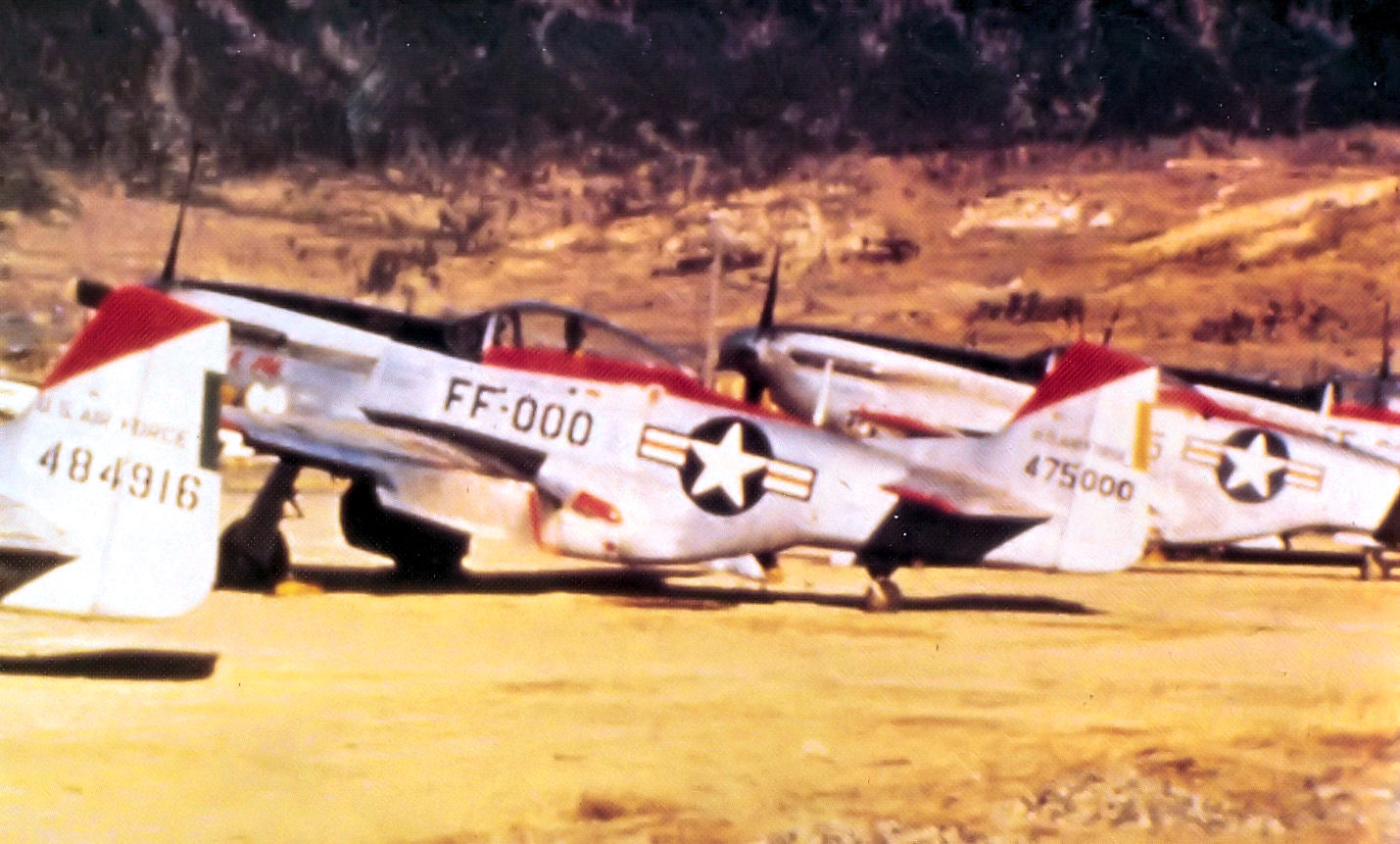
F-51s South Korea 1950

As a result of the North Korean invasion of South Korea in June 1950, the squadron was moved from the Philippines to Taegu Air Base, South Korea in July. At Taego, the squadron exchanged its Lockheed P-80 Shooting Star jets for propeller-driven North American F-51D Mustangs which were more suited to the ground attack and support role. Combat targets included tanks and armored vehicles, locomotives, artillery and antiaircraft guns, fuel and ammunition dumps, warehouses and factories, and troop concentrations.

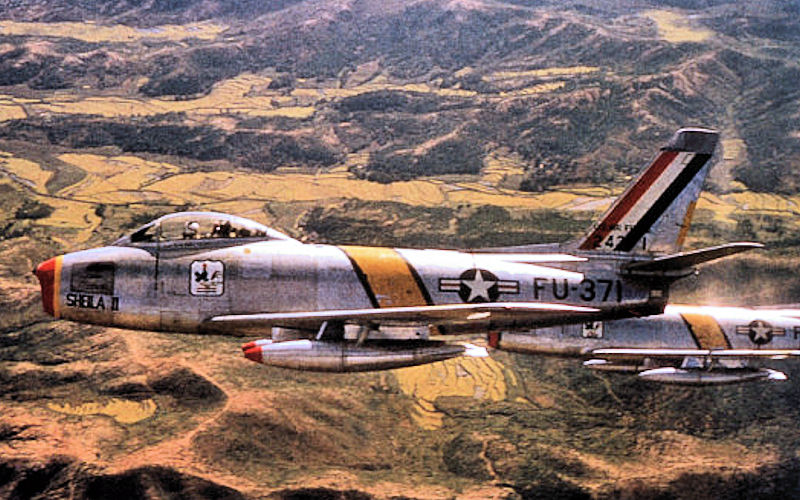
North American F-86F-25-NH Sabre 52–5371, Korea, 1953

In August, advancing communist forces and insufficient aircraft parking at Taegu forced the unit to move to Japan, but it returned to South Korea the following month to support UN forces in a counteroffensive. Because the front advanced so rapidly, operations from Pusan East Air Base soon became impractical, and the unit moved in November to Pyongyang East Air Base, North Korea.

The Chinese Communist intervention caused the unit to move twice in as many weeks, first to Suwon Air Base, South Korea, then to Chinhae Air Base. From there the unit continued to support ground forces and carry out armed reconnaissance and interdiction missions. Throughout the conflict, the squadron moved from base to base in South Korea. In January 1953 the squadron rejoined the wing at Osan-ni Air Base where it transitioned to the North American F-86 Sabre without halting the fight against the enemy. It flew its first F-86 counter air mission on 26 February 1953. In the final days of the war, the squadron attacked dispersed enemy aircraft at Sinuiju and Uiju Airfields.

The squadron remained in Korea for some time after the armistice. It moved to Kadena Air Base, Okinawa in November 1954, performing tactical fighter operations in South Korea, Japan, Formosa (later Taiwan), and the Philippines with frequent deployments. In 1957, the squadron upgraded to the North American F-100 Super Sabre.

=== Vietnam War ===
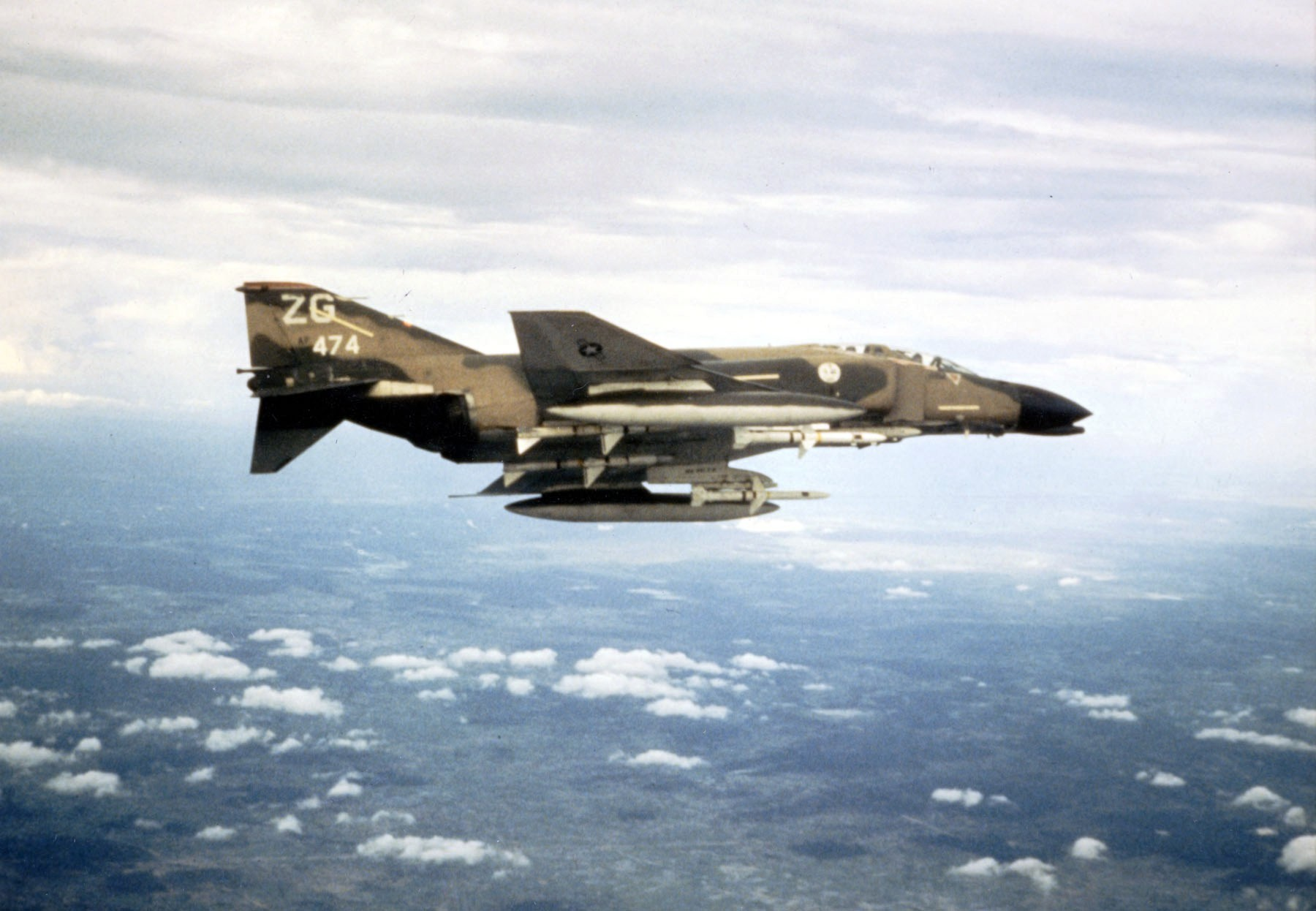
A 67th TFS EF-4C over North Vietnam, December 1972.

Was re-equipped with the Republic F-105 Thunderchief in 1962. As a result of the increased level of combat in Southeast Asia, the squadron was deployed to Korat Royal Thai Air Force Base, Thailand, where it carried out tactical bombardment missions over North and South Vietnam in 1965, returning to Kadena at the end of October.

Moved to Misawa Air Base, Japan in December 1967, being reassigned to the 39th Air Division. Equipment was changed to the McDonnell Douglas F-4 Phantom II, with a mission to rotate squadrons to South Korea, providing air defense of the nation. Remained in Japan/South Korea until returned to Kadena in March 1971, being reassigned back to the 18th Tactical Fighter Wing.

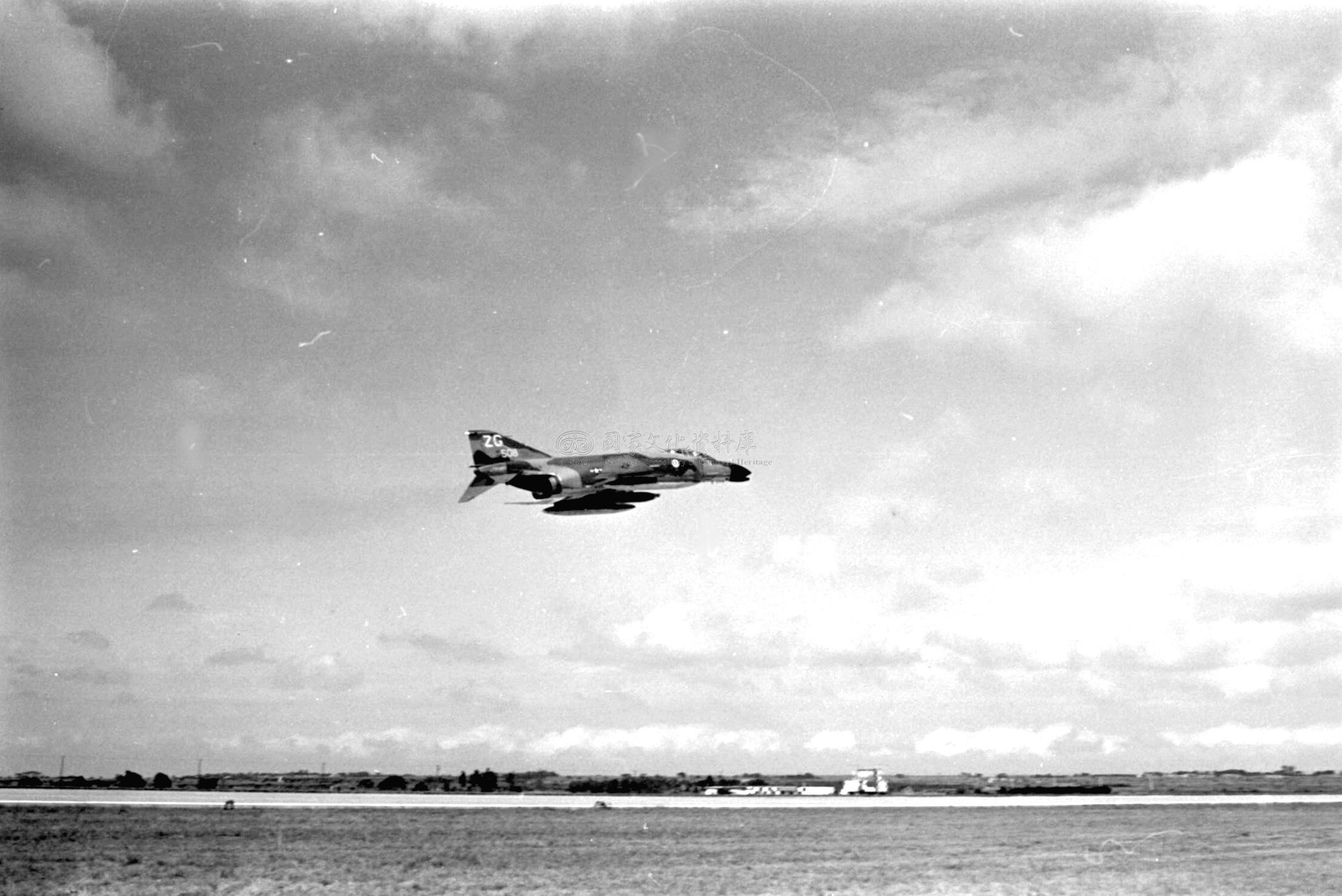
The EF-4C 63-7508 of the 67th Tactical Fighter Squadron took off from the Ching Chuan Kang Air Base, Taiwan for Combat air patrol, 20 November 1972

Until May 1975, primary mission was the air defense of Taiwan, performing frequent rotational temporary duty to Ching Chuan Kang Air Base. Chinese air defense mission ended with United States' political recognition of Communist China and end of United States military deployments to Taiwan.

=== Modern era ===
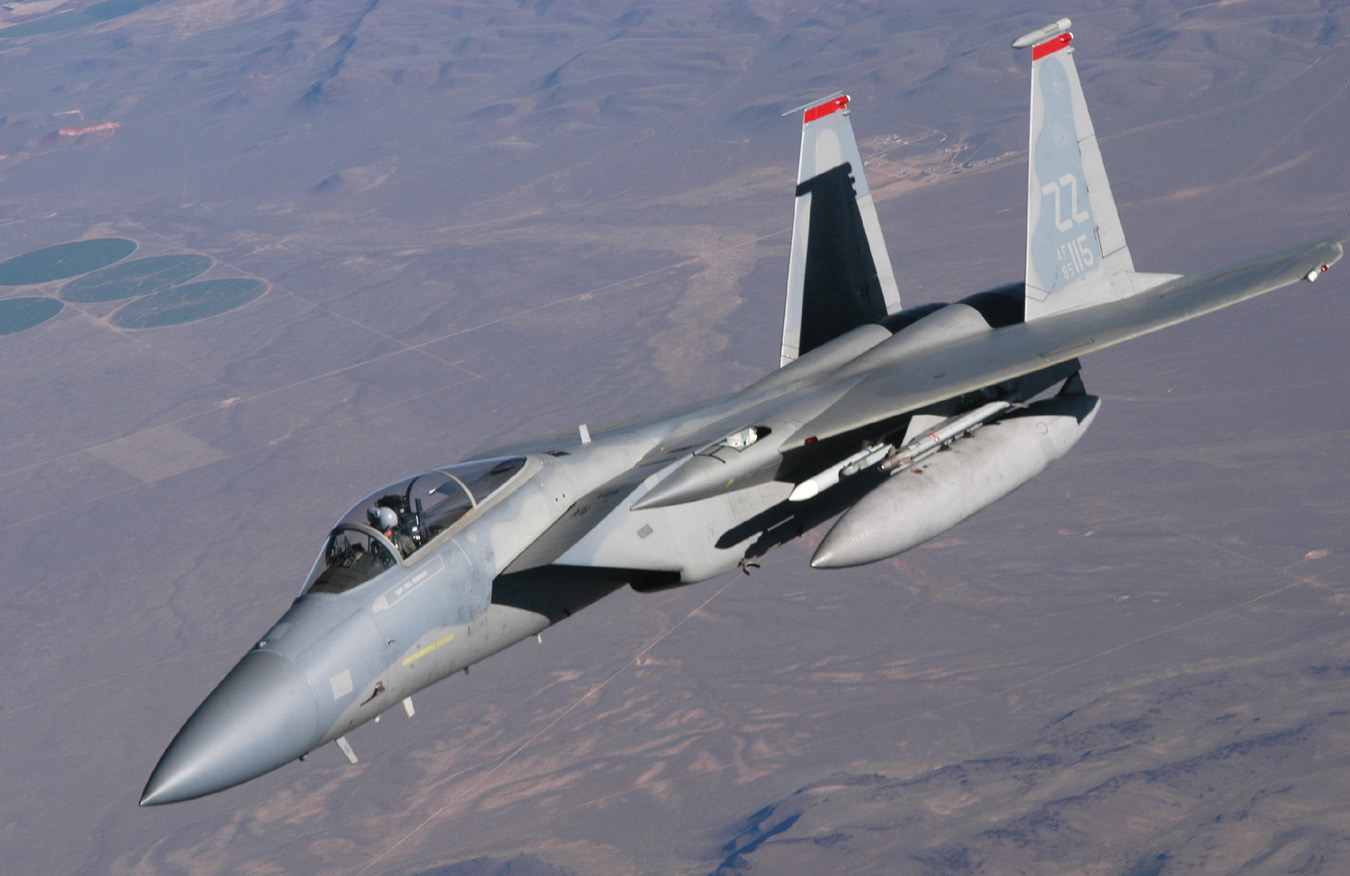
67th Fighter Squadron F-15C in 2008

For the past 35 years, the squadron has operated from Kadena Air Base, providing air defense in the Far East.

==== 2013 Sequestration ====
Air Combat Command officials announced a stand down and reallocation of flying hours for the rest of the fiscal year 2013 due to mandatory budget cuts. The across-the board spending cuts, called sequestration, took effect 1 March when Congress failed to agree on a deficit-reduction plan.

Squadrons either stood down on a rotating basis or kept combat ready or at a reduced readiness level called "basic mission capable" for part or all of the remaining months in fiscal 2013. This affected the 67th Fighter Squadron with a reduction of its flying hours, placing it into a basic mission capable status from 5 April-30 September 2013.

== Lineage ==
- Constituted as the 67th Pursuit Squadron (Interceptor) on 20 November 1940

Activated on 15 January 1941
Redesignated 67th Fighter Squadron on 15 May 1942
Redesignated 67th Fighter Squadron, Single Engine on 20 August 1943
Redesignated 67th Fighter Squadron, Two Engine on 24 May 1944
Redesignated 67th Fighter Squadron, Single Engine on 6 May 1946
Redesignated 67th Fighter Squadron, Jet Propelled on 17 July 1946
Redesignated 67th Fighter Squadron, Single Engine on 14 March 1947
Redesignated 67th Fighter Squadron, Jet on 10 November 1949
Redesignated 67th Fighter-Bomber Squadron on 20 January 1950
Redesignated 67th Tactical Fighter Squadron on 1 July 1958
Redesignated 67th Fighter Squadron on 1 October 1991

=== Assignments ===
- 58th Pursuit Group (later 58th Fighter Group), 15 January 1941 (attached to Southwest Pacific Area c. 26 February 1942, South Pacific Area c. 15 March 1942, Americal Division c. 28 April 1942)
- 347th Fighter Group, 3 October 1942
- 18th Fighter Group (later, 18 Fighter-Bomber Group), 1 November 1945 (attached to Air Task Group 5, Provisional 27 January–17 February 1955, Air Task Force 13, Provisional 1 July–1 October 1955, 18th Fighter-Bomber Wing after 1 February 1957)
- 18th Fighter-Bomber Wing (later 18 Tactical Fighter Wing), 1 October 1957 (attached to 2d Air Division, 18 February–26 April 1965, 16 August–23 October 1965)
- 39th Air Division, 15 December 1967
- 475th Tactical Fighter Wing, 15 January 1968 (attached to Fifth Air Force ADVON, 7 October–8 December 1968, 3 March–3 April 1969, 2 June–2 July 1969, 30 August–1 October 1969, 1–18 January 1970, 16 February–2 March 1970, 29 March–8 April 1970; Detachment 1, Headquarters, 475th Tactical Fighter Wing, 8–12 April 1970, 10–24 May 1970, 21 June–4 July 1970, 18 July–25 August 1970, 15–29 November 1970, 10–22 January 1971, 5–15 February 1971)
- 18th Tactical Fighter Wing, 15 March 1971 (attached to 3d Tactical Fighter Wing 2 June–28 July 1972, 8 September–16 October 1972); 327th Air Division, 8 November 1972 – 14 July 1973, 5–26 August 1973, 16 September–7 October 1973, 28 October–18 November 1973, 9–30 December 1973, 20 January–10 February 1974, 2–23 March 1974, 13 April–4 May 1974, 25 May–15 June 1974, 2–27 July 1974, 16 October–1 December 1974, 9 January–20 February 1975, 20 April–30 May 1975)
- 18th Tactical Fighter Group, 1 May 1978
- 18th Tactical Fighter Wing, 11 February 1981
- 18th Operations Group, 1 October 1991 – present

=== Stations ===
- Selfridge Field, Michigan, 15 January 1941
- Harding Field, Louisiana, 6 October 1941
- Fort Dix Army Air Base, New Jersey, 19–20 January 1942
- Camp Darley, Victoria, Australia, 27 February 1942
- Nouméa Airfield, New Caledonia, 15 March 1942
- Tontouta Airfield, Nouméa, New Caledonia, 17 March 1942 (air echelon operated from Henderson Field, Guadalcanal, Solomon Islands, 22 August–22 December 1942 and 29 January-c. 9 April 1943)
- Oua Tom Airfield, La Foa, New Caledonia, 24 April 1943 (air echelon operated from Port Moresby Airfield Complex, New Guinea, 30 May–28 June 1943)
- Gurney Airfield, Milne Bay, New Guinea, 17 June 1943
- Woodlark Airfield, New Guinea, 23 July 1943 (air echelon operated from Munda Airfield, New Georgia, Solomon Islands, 28 October–16 December 1943)
- Renard Field, Banika Island, Russell Islands, 23 January 1944 (air echelon operated from Torokina Airfield, Bougainville Island, Solomon Islands 2 March–3 April 1944, detachment of air echelon operated from Stirling Airfield, Stirling Island, Solomon Islands, 8–25 May 1944); air echelon operated from Stirling Airfield, Stirling Island, Solomon Islands, 18 July–16 August 1944)
- Middleburg Airfield, Netherlands East Indies, 15 August 1944
- McGuire Field, Mindoro, Philippines, 22 February 1945 (air echelon operated from Wama Airfield, Morotai, Netherlands East Indies, 12 February–21 March 1945)
- Puerto Princesa Airfield, Palawan, Philippines, 6 March 1945 (air echelon operated from Laoag Airfield, Luzon, Philippines, 9–28 August 1945)
- Moret Field, Mindanao, Philippines, c. October 1945
- Laoag Airfield, Luzon, Philippines, October 1945
- Puerto Princesa Airfield, Palawan, Philippines, 8 February 1946
- Floridablanca Airfield, Luzon, Philippines, 17 July 1946
- Clark Field (later Clark Air Force Base), Luzon, Philippines, 16 September 1947

Deployed to Kadena Air Base, Okinawa, 1–7 March 1949

- Johnson Air Base, Japan, 24 July 1950
- Ashiya Air Base, Japan, 30 July 1950
- Pusan East Air Base, South Korea, 8 September 1950
- Pyongyang East Air Base, North Korea, 21 November 1950
- Suwon Air Base, South Korea, 1 December 1950
- Chinhae Air Base, South Korea, c. 16 December 1950 (operated from Pusan West Air Base, South Korea, 27 March-c. 23 April 1951, Suwon Auxiliary Air Base, South Korea, 7 April-c. 8 May 1951, Seoul Air Base, South Korea, 8 May–9 August 1951 and 19 August–30 September 1951; Hoengsong Air Base, South Korea, 1 October 1951 – 1 June 1952
- Hoengsong Air Base, South Korea, 2 June 1952 (operated from Taegu Air Base, South Korea, 17–21 September 1952)
- Osan-ni Air Base, South Korea, 10 January 1953
- Kadena Air Base, Okinawa, 30 October 1954 (deployed to Yontan Auxiliary Air Base, Okinawa, 10 November–11 December 1954; Chiayi Air Base, Taiwan, 27 January–17 February 1955 and 1 July – 1 October 1955; Korat Royal Thai Air Force Base, Thailand, 18 February–26 April 1965 and 16 August–23 October 1965)
- Misawa Air Base, Japan, 15 December 1967 (deployed to Taegu Air Base, South Korea, 7 October – 8 December 1968, 3 March – 3 April 1969, 2 June – 2 July 1969, 30 August – 1 October 1969, 1–18 January 1970, 16 February–2 March 1970 and 29 March–8 April 1970); Kunsan Air Base, South Korea, 8–12 April 1970, 10–24 May 1970, 21 June–4 July 1970, 18 July–25 August 1970, 15–29 November 1970, 10–22 January 1971, and 5–15 February 1971)
- Kadena Air Base, Okinawa (later Japan), 15 March 1971 – present (deployed to Kunsan Air Base, South Korea, 2 June–28 July 1972 and 8 September–16 October 1972; Ching Chuan Kang Air Base, Taiwan, 8 November 1972 – 14 July 1973, 5–26 August 1973, 16 September–7 October 1973, 28 October–18 November 1973, 9–30 December 1973, 20 January–10 February 1974, 2–23 March 1974, 13 April–4 May 1974, 25 May–15 June 1974, 2–27 July 1974, 16 October–1 December 1974, 9 January–20 February 1975, and 20 April–30 May 1975
- Ching Chuan Kang Air Base, Taichung, Taiwan, 6 November 1972 – 31 May 1975
- Chiayi Air Base, Chiayi, Taiwan, 27 January – 17 February 1955 and 1 July – 1 October 1955

=== Aircraft ===
- Seversky P-35 (1941)
- Curtiss P-36 Hawk (1941)
- Bell P-400 (1942)
- Bell P-39 Airacobra (1942–1944)
- Lockheed P-38 Lightning (1944–1946)
- North American P-51 (later F-51) Mustang (1946, 1948–1953)
- Republic P-47 (later F-47) Thunderbolt (1946–1948)
- Lockheed P-80 (later F-80) Shooting Star (1946–1947, 1949–1950)
- North American F-86 Sabre (1953–1957)
- North American F-100 Super Sabre (1957–1962)
- Republic F-105 Thunderchief (1962–1967)
- McDonnell F-4 Phantom II (1968–1979)
- McDonnell Douglas F-15 Eagle (1979–2024)
- Boeing F-15EX Eagle II (2026–present)

== Bibliography ==
- Maurer, Maurer, ed. (1982) [1969]. Combat Squadrons of the Air Force, World War II (PDF) (reprint ed.). Washington, DC: Office of Air Force History. ISBN 0-405-12194-6. LCCN 70605402. OCLC 72556. Archived from the original (PDF) on 20 December 2016.
