= Operation Combat Fox =

US military operation in 1968

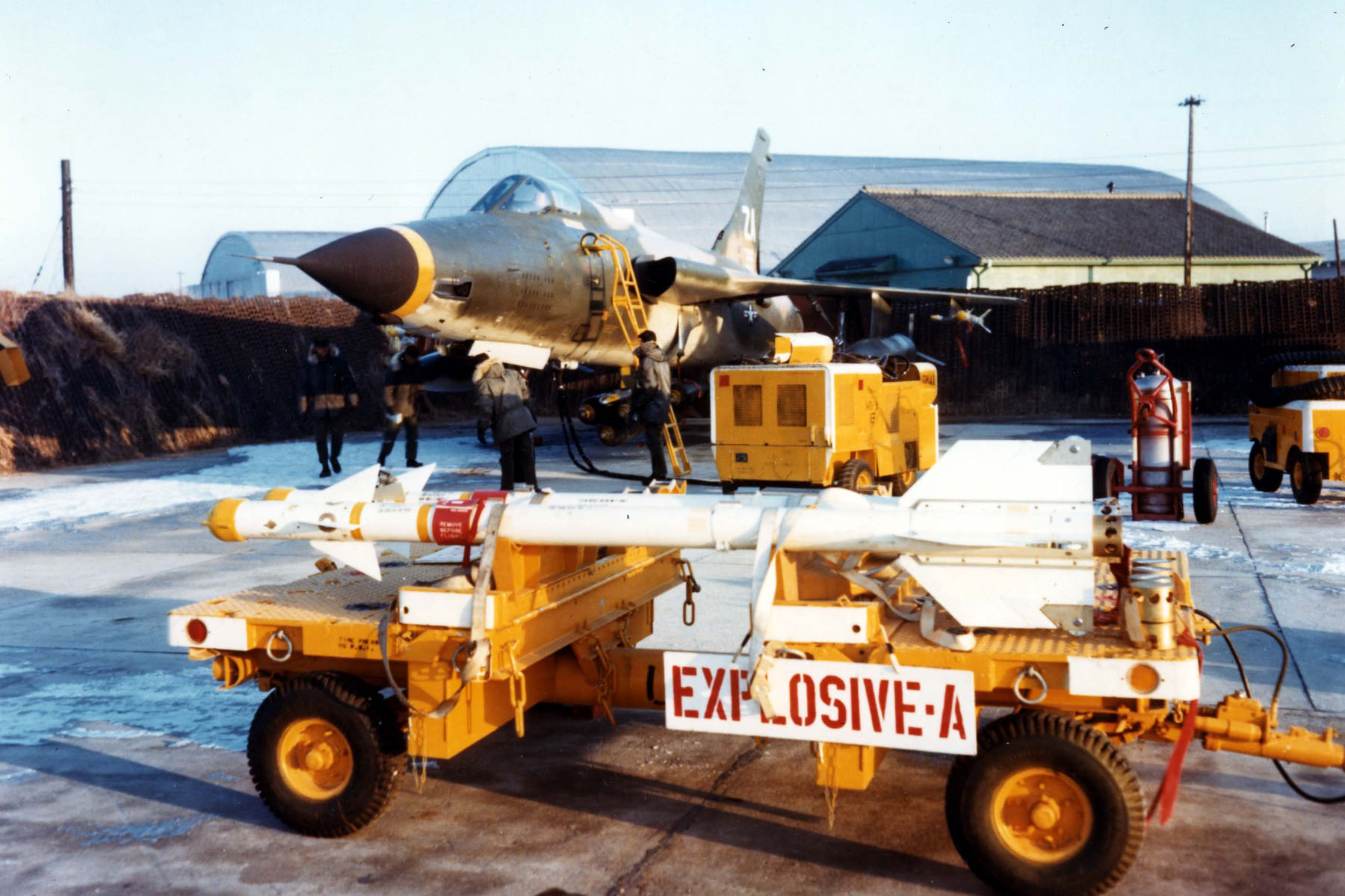
A U.S. Air Force Republic F-105D Thunderchief of the 12th Tactical Fighter Squadron, 18th Tactical Fighter Wing, at Osan Air Base, Korea, during Operation "Firefly" in 1968 that was initiated after the “Pueblo Incident”. Note that the aircraft is armed with six Mk 117 750 lb bombs and AIM-9B Sidewinder air-to-air missiles.

On January 23, 1968, North Korean patrol boats supported by two Mikoyan-Gurevich MiG-21 fighters captured the USS Pueblo northeast of the North Korean island of Ung-do. The seizure of the Pueblo led to President Lyndon Johnson ordering a show of force with a massive deployment of U.S. air and navy assets to Korea. The airlift and deployment of 200+ aircraft was code named Operation Combat Fox while the deployment of six aircraft carriers plus support vessels was code named Operation Formation Star. The operations were supported by the partial mobilization of reservists for the first time since the Cuban Missile Crisis. CIA A-12 Oxcart reconnaissance overflights over North Korea were used to monitor a feared retaliatory mobilization of North Korean forces and when these flights revealed no mobilization or large scale deployments by North Korean forces, Operation Combat Fox forces were stood down.

== Soviet response ==
Publicly, the Soviet Union responded by augmenting their naval forces in the Pacific and by sending a letter to US president Lyndon B. Johnson on February 3, 1968 demanding that the United States scale back their build-up in the Sea of Japan. Privately however, Alexei Kosygin gave assurances to the US ambassador in Moscow (Llewellyn Thompson) on 6 February 1968 that the Soviet Union had no intention to go to war over Kim Il Sung's provocation. As a response to this overture, Lyndon Johnson agreed to withdraw one unnamed vessel "somewhat southward". This exchange enabled Brezhnev to make a subsequent face-saving statement to the 23rd Congress of the Communist Party of the Soviet Union that the Soviet letter was answered by the Americans by withdrawing the USS Enterprise from DPRK's shores.

== Units deployed ==
Fifth Air Force - Osan AFB (Advance echelon sent from Fuchu AS)

4th Tactical Fighter Wing - Kunsan AFB (72 F-4D Sent From Seymour Johnson AFB)

334th Tactical Fighter Squadron - Kwangju AFB
335th Tactical Fighter Squadron
336th Tactical Fighter Squadron

18th Tactical Fighter Wing (-) - Osan AFB (12 F-105D Sent From Kadena AFB)

15th Tactical Reconnaissance Squadron
12th Tactical Fighter Squadron

19th Tactical Electronic Warfare Squadron - Taegu AFB (6 EB-66 Sent From Shaw AFB)
64th Fighter-Interceptor Squadron - Kimpo AFB (24 F-102A Sent From Naha AFB)
82nd Fighter-Interceptor Squadron - Suwon AFB (24 F-102A Sent From Naha AFB)
318th Fighter-Interceptor Squadron - Osan AFB (24 F-106A Sent From McChord AFB)
356th Tactical Fighter Squadron - Kunsan AFB (14 F-4C Sent From Misawa AFB)
558th Tactical Fighter Squadron - Taegu AFB (14 F-4C Sent From Cam Ranh Base AFB)
