= La Foa – Oua Tom Airport =

Airport in New Caledonia, France

Coordinates: 21.8197°S 165.861°E

La Foa – Oua Tom Airport (ICAO: NWWT) is an airport in La Foa, New Caledonia.

== History ==
=== World War II ===
The 67th Fighter Squadron operating P-39s was based here from 24 April-17 June 1943.
