= 356th Fighter Squadron =

356th Fighter Squadron

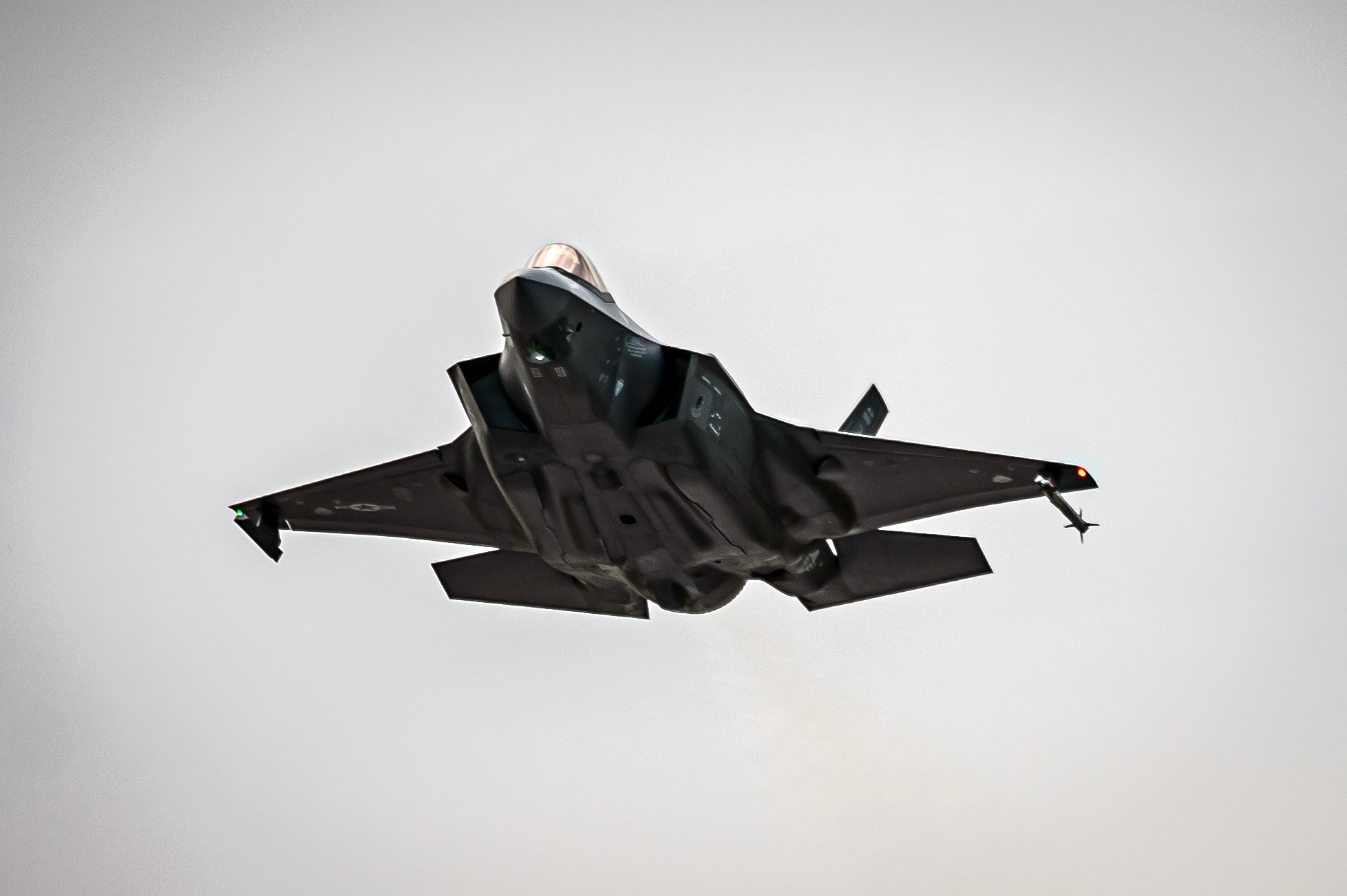
- F-35 Lightning II of the 356th Fighter Squadron at Eielson Air Force Base
- Active: 1942–1946; 1956–1992; 2019–present
- Country: United States
- Branch: United States Air Force
- Role: Fighter
- Part of: 354th Operations Group
- Garrison/HQ: Eielson Air Force Base
- Nickname: Green Demons
- Motto: Give'm Hell!
- Colors: Black, Green, Red
- Engagements: World War II; Korean War; 1958 Lebanon crisis; Cuban Missile Crisis; Vietnam War; Operation Combat Fox; Gulf War

Commanders
- Current commander: Lt Colonel Joseph “SCAB” Curran

Insignia
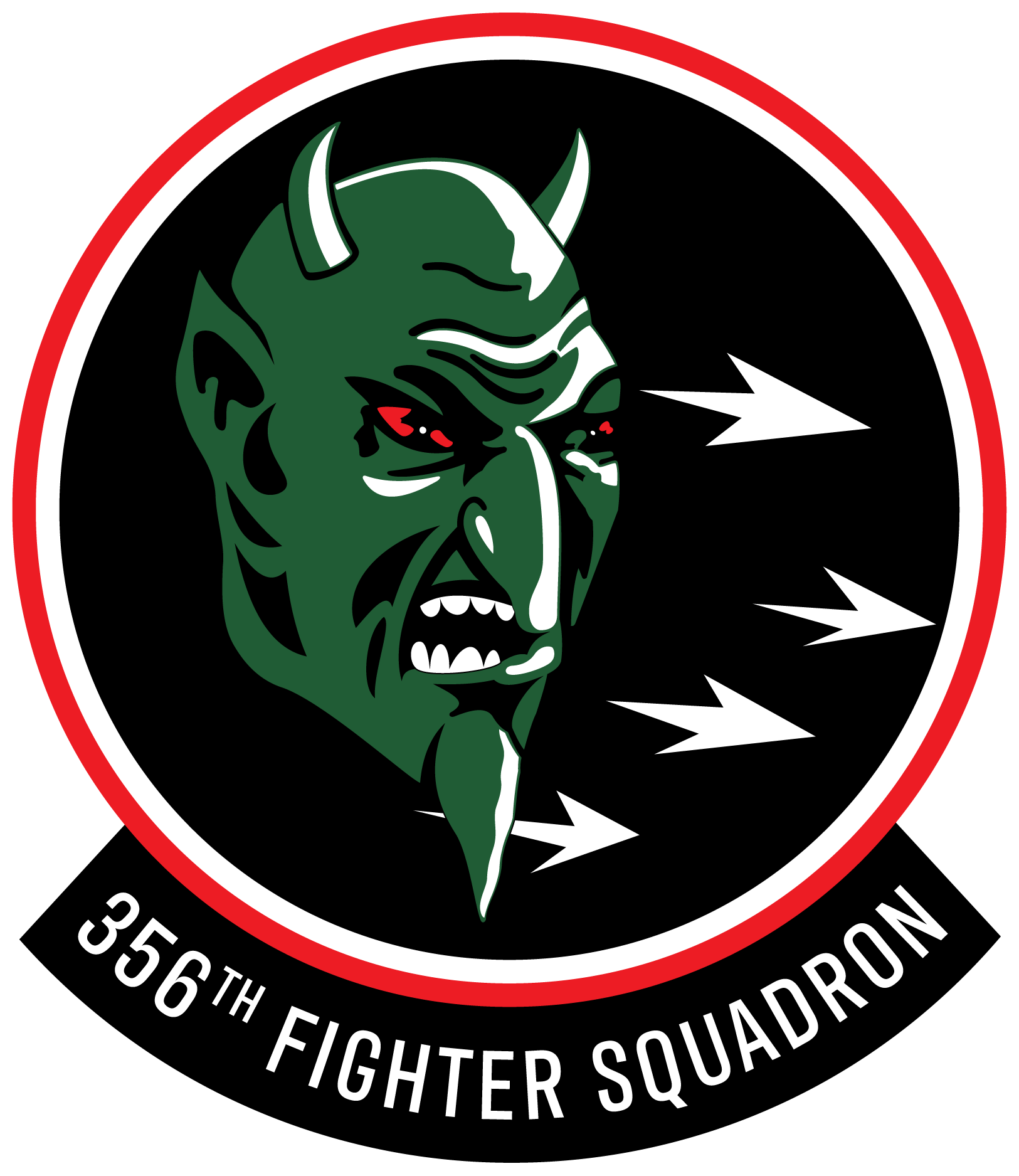
- 356th Fighter Squadron emblem

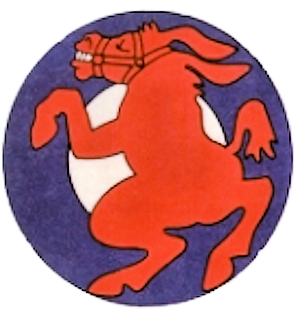
- World War II squadron emblem

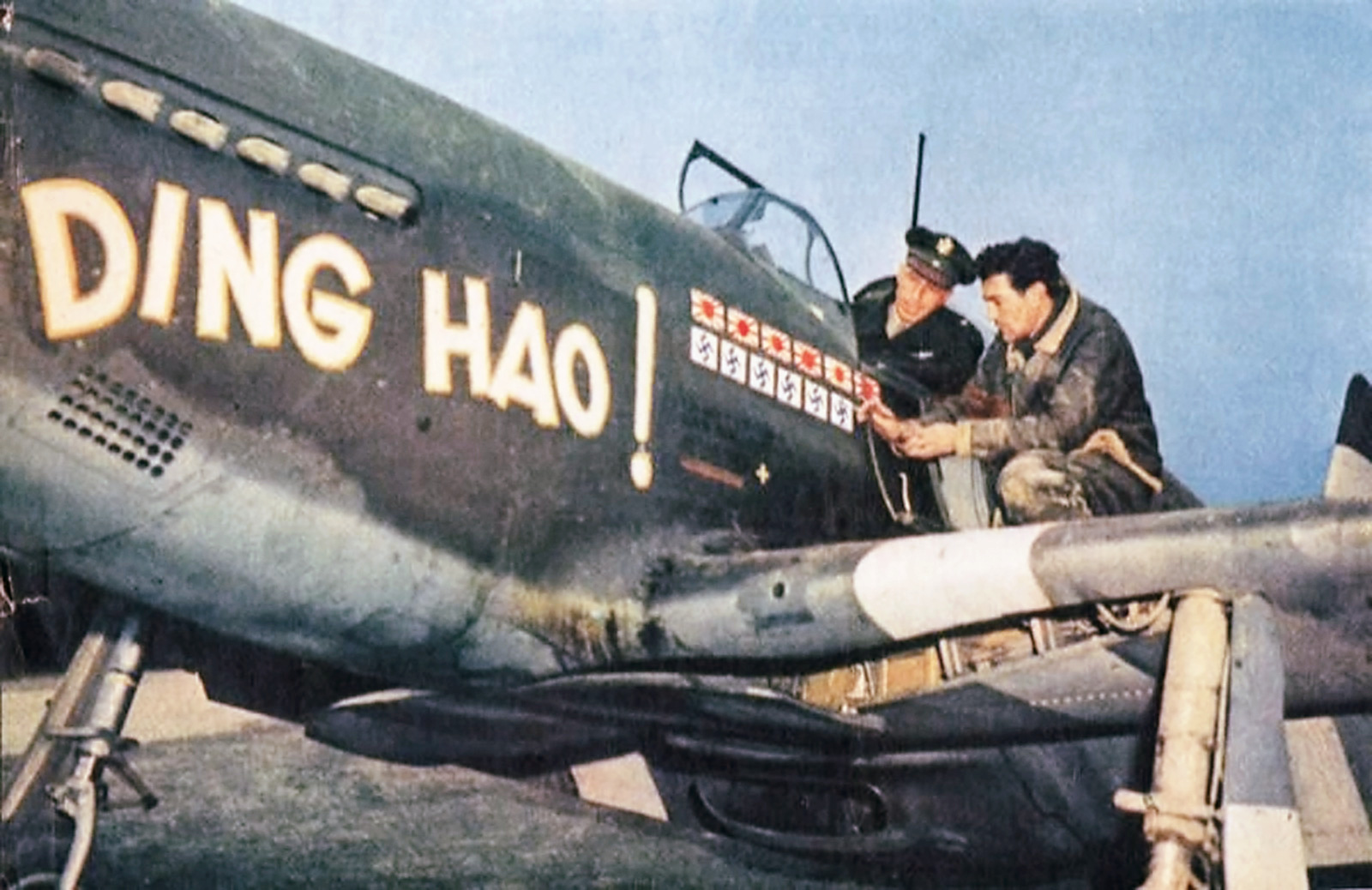
North American P-51B-5 Mustang (serial 43–6315) Ding Hao!, flown by Major James H. Howard (in cockpit) commander of the 356th. Photo taken at RAF Boxted, England, March 1944. He would go on to earn the Medal of Honor, June 1944.

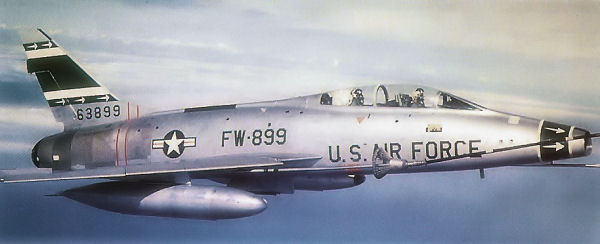
North American F-100F-10-NA Super Sabre (serial 56–3899) over Aviano Air Base, Italy, 1960

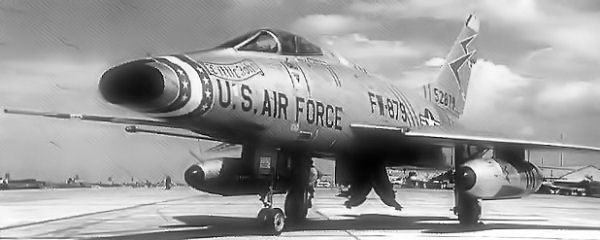
F-100D-50-NH Super Sabre (serial 55–2879) on nuclear alert duty, Kunsan Air Base, South Korea, 1965

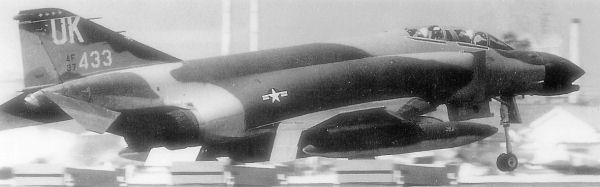
F-4C-16-MC Phantom (serial 63–7433) while based at Misawa Air Base, Japan, 1968

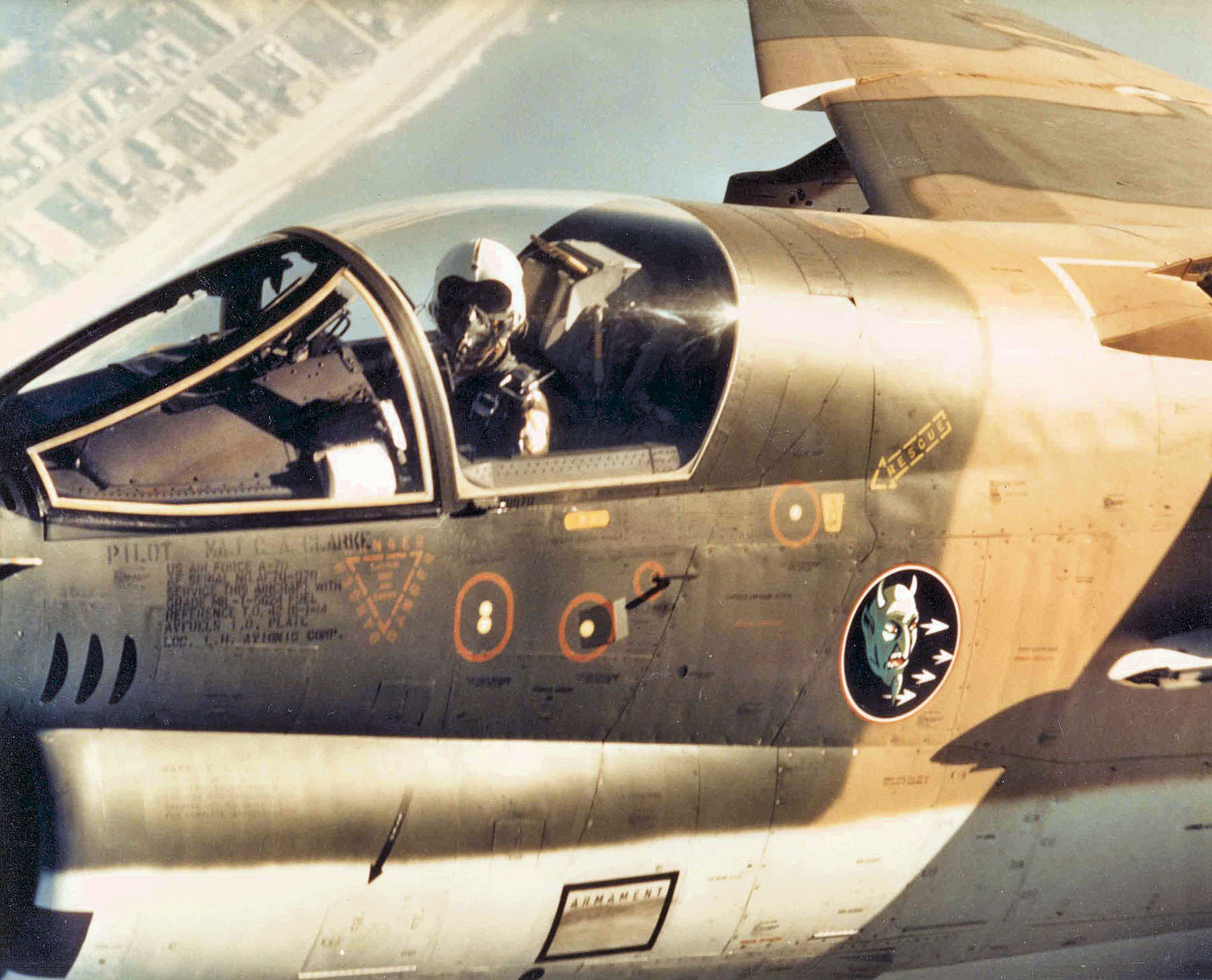
LTV A-7D-8-CV Corsair II (serial 70–1070) over Myrtle Beach Air Force Base, South Carolina, 1973

The 356th Fighter Squadron is an active United States Air Force fighter squadron. It is assigned to the 354th Fighter Wing, being stationed at Eielson Air Force Base, Alaska. It was reactivated in 2019 to operate the Lockheed Martin F-35 Lightning II.

The squadron was first activated during World War II and flew the North American P-51 Mustang on escort missions for Eighth Air Force bombers over western Europe from mid-1943. With IX Fighter Command, it was re-equipped with the Republic P-47 Thunderbolt in early 1944 and flew ground attack missions until the end of the war.

It was reactivated in 1956 and became the 356th Tactical Fighter Squadron, flying the North American F-100 Super Sabre. It was deployed to Misawa Air Base in Japan between 1965 and 1971, and after a brief inactivation was reactivated at Myrtle Beach Air Force Base. The squadron fought in the Gulf War, equipped with the Fairchild Republic A-10 Thunderbolt II, and was inactivated in 1992 after briefly returning to its original designation. The 356th is the first fighter squadron in Pacific Air Forces to fly the F-35 Lightning II.

== World War II ==
Activated on 15 November 1942 at Hamilton Field, California, initially equipped with P-39 Airacobras and assigned to IV Fighter Command for training. Moved to several bases in California and Nevada then to Portland Army Air Base, Oregon, in June 1943 and re-equipped with new P-51B Mustangs. Transitioned to the Mustang throughout the summer of 1943 the deployed to the European Theater of Operations (ETO), being assigned to IX Fighter Command in England.

In late 1943, the strategic bombardment campaign over Occupied Europe and Nazi Germany being conducted by VIII Bomber Command was taking heavy losses in aircraft and flight crews as the VIII Fighter Command's P-38 Lightnings and P-47 Thunderbolts lacked the range to escort the heavy B-17 Flying Fortress and B-24 Liberator bombers deep into Germany to attack industrial and military targets. The P-51 had the range to perform the escort duties and the unit's operational control was transferred to Headquarters, Eighth Air Force to perform escort missions. From its base at RAF Boxted, the unit flew long-range strategic escort missions with VIII Bomber Command groups, escorting the heavy bombers to targets such as Frankfurt, Leipzig, Augsburg, and Schweinfurt, engaging Luftwaffe day interceptors frequently, with the P-51s outperforming the German Bf 109 and Fw 190 interceptors, causing heavy losses to the Luftwaffe. Remained under operational control of Eighth Air Force until April 1944, when sufficient numbers of P-51D Mustangs and arrived from the United States and were assigned to VIII Fighter Command units for escort duty.

Was relieved from escort duty and was re-equipped with P-47D Thunderbolts, and reassigned to RAF Lashenden on the southern coast of England. Mission was redefined to provide tactical air support for the forthcoming invasion of France, to support the Third, and later Ninth United States Armies. Flew fighter sweeps over Normandy and along the English Channel coast of France and the Low Countries, April–June 1944, then engaged in heavy tactical bombing of enemy military targets as well as roads, railroads and bridges in the Normandy area to support ground forces in the immediate aftermath of D-Day.

Moved to Advanced Landing Grounds in France beginning at the end of June, 1944, moving eastwards to combat airfields and liberated French airports supporting Allied Ground forces as the advanced across Northern France. Later, in 1944, the squadron became involved in dive-bombing and strafing missions, striking railroad yards, bridges, troop concentrations, and airfields. Participated in attacks on German forces in Belgium in the aftermath of the Battle of the Bulge, then moved eastward as part of the Western Allied invasion of Germany. The squadron flew its last mission of the war on 7 May 1945 from the captured Luftwaffe airfield at Ansbach (R-45).

Remained in Occupied Germany as part of the United States Air Forces in Europe XII Tactical Air Command occupying force after the German Capitulation, being stationed at AAF Station Herzogenaurach. Was inactivated on 31 March 1946.

== Post-Korean War Reactivation ==
Reactivated by Tactical Air Command, United States Air Force on 19 November 1956, being assigned to the reactivated 354th Fighter-Day Group at the new Myrtle Beach Air Force Base, South Carolina. Equipped with North American F-100 Super Sabre fighters, the squadron participated in exercises, operations, tests, and firepower demonstrations conducted by the Tactical Air Command within the US and abroad. The unit frequently deployed to Aviano Air Base, Italy and Wheelus Air Base, Libya. Was deployed to Europe during the 1958 Lebanon crisis and was moved to McCoy AFB, Florida in 1962 during the Cuban Missile Crisis.

== Vietnam War ==
During the Vietnam War, the unit was deployed to Misawa Air Base, Japan on 16 March 1965. At Misawa, it was assigned to the 39th Air Division, whose mission was to support Misawa, Taegu Air Base and Kunsan Air Base in South Korea which all had just been reactivated.

From Misawa, aircraft and personnel of the 356th rotated six F-100D aircraft every ten days to Kunsan and Taegu performing Nuclear alert duty. The 356th was on a TDY status to Misawa AB until 13 August 1965 when it was permanently reassigned to the 39th AD.

In August 1967, the F-100's were sent to Vietnam as replacement aircraft and the 356 TFS converted to the F-4 Phantom II.

On 15 January 1968, the 475th Tactical Fighter Wing was activated at Misawa and took over as host unit from the 39th Air Division.

On 23 January 1968, as a response to the capture by the North Koreans of the USS Pueblo, the 356 TFS was immediately dispatched to Kunsan. For a week, the 356 TFS was the only deterrent at Kunsan until the 4th Tactical Fighter Wing was deployed from Seymour Johnson Air Force Base, NC and took over alert duties.

When the 354 TFW became the permanent host unit at Kunsan AB in July 1968, the 356th was NOT assigned to its 354th TFW host unit at Myrtle Beach AFB. At Kunsan, the 356 TFS was part of Detachment 1, 475th Tactical Fighter Wing, which was a separate operating unit. On 15 March 1971, the 3d Tactical Fighter Wing replaced the 475 TFW at Misawa and absorbed its assets. The 356 TFS was inactivated and the squadron was reassigned back to the 354 TFW at Myrtle Beach AFB.

Returning to Myrtle Beach AFB in 1971, the unit was re-equipped with A-7D Corsair II fighter-bombers. The unit operated from Korat RTAFB from October 1972 to April 1973.

The 356th TFS aircraft flew Combat Search and Rescue "Sandy" missions to locate and protect downed airmen until they were rescued. On November 17, 1972, Major Colin A. "Arnie" Clarke led a successful 9-hour mission to recover a F-105 Wild Weasel crew shot down near Thanh Hoa the previous night. Clarke returned safely despite taking heavy damage from ground fire, and was later awarded the Air Force Cross for his role.

The unit frequently interchanged personnel with the provisional 4554th Tactical Fighter Training Squadron assigned to the 354th at Myrtle Beach.

== Post-Vietnam ==
The 356th Tactical Fighter Squadron was re-equipped with the Republic A-10 Thunderbolt II in 1977, and on 1 July 1977 was the first squadron in the USAF to be declared operationally ready with the A-10. The unit deployed to King Fahd International Airport, Saudi Arabia 15 August 1990. During Desert Storm, the squadron engaged in combat operations, January–February 1991, inflicting heavy damage to enemy armor and artillery emplacements, cut off enemy supply lines, and engaged in search and rescue operations.

Returned to the United States in March 1991, and returned to peacetime training operations. Immediately began phasing down with the designated BRAC 1990 closure of Myrtle Beach AFB and the pending inactivation of its host Wing. The squadron's aircraft were dispersed, being reassigned to Air National Guard and other active Air Force Fighter Squadrons throughout the balance of 1991 and early 1992. The squadron was inactivated 10 June 1992.

The squadron was reactivated on 10 October 2019 at Eielson Air Force Base, assigned to the 354th Operations Group. It is to be equipped with the F-35A Lightning II.

== Lineage ==
- Constituted 356th Fighter Squadron 12 November 1942.

Activated 15 November 1942.
Inactivated 31 March 1946.

- Redesignated 356th Fighter-Day Squadron 28 September 1956.

Activated 19 November 1956.
Redesignated 356th Tactical Fighter Squadron 1 July 1958.
Redesignated 356th Fighter Squadron 1 November 1991
Inactivated 10 June 1992
Activated 10 October 2019

== Assignments ==
- 354th Fighter Group, 12 November 1942 – 31 March 1946
- 354th Fighter-Day Group, 19 November 1956
- 354th Fighter-Day (later, Tactical Fighter) Wing, 25 September 1957
- 39th Air Division, 29 November 1965
- 475th Tactical Fighter Wing, 15 January 1968

Attached to: Detachment 1 or Detachment 2, 475th Tactical Fighter Wing, 15 January 1968 – 15 March 1971

Attachments were for 10-day periods, rotating every 30 days

- 3d Tactical Fighter Wing, 15 March 1971
- 354th Tactical Fighter (later, Fighter) Wing, 15 May 1971 – 10 June 1992
- 354th Operations Group, 10 October 2019 -

== Stations ==
- Hamilton AAF, California, 15 November 1942
- Tonapah AAF, Nevada, 20 January 1943
- Salem AAF, Oregon, 3 June – 6 October 1943
- RAF Greenham Common, England, 4 November 1943
- RAF Boxted, England, 13 November 1943
- RAF Lashenden, England, c. 14 April 1944
- Cricqueville-en-Bessin, France (ALG A-2), c. 18 June 1944
- Gaël, France (ALG A-31), 14 August 1944
- Orconte, France (ALG A-66), 21 September 1944

Operated from Saint-Dizier/Robinson, France (ALG A-64), c. 18 November – 1 December 1944

- Rosieres en Haye, France (ALG A-98), 1 December 1944
- Mainz-Finthen Airdrome (ALG Y-64), Ober-Olm, Germany, c. 4 April 1945
- Ansbach Airdrome, Germany (ALG R-82), 1 May 1945
- Herzogenaurach Airdrome, Germany (ALG R-29), c. 15 May 1945 – 15 February 1946
- Bolling Field, Washington, D.C., 15 February – 31 March 1946
- Myrtle Beach AFB, South Carolina, 19 November 1956 – 29 November 1965

Rotational 90-day deployments to Aviano AB, Italy and Incirlik AB, Turkey 1958–1966
Deployed to: McCoy AFB, Florida, 21 October – 1 December 1962 (Cuban Missile Crisis)
Deployed to: Misawa AB, Japan, 13 August – 29 November 1965

- Misawa AB, Japan, 29 November 1965 – 15 May 1971

Deployed to: Kunsan AB, South Korea, January 1968 – March 1971 (Rotational deployment for a 10-day period every 30 days)
Deployed to: Tageu AB, South Korea, July 1968 – April 1970 (Rotational deployment for a 10-day period every 30 days)
Not equipped or manned, 15 March – 15 May 1971

- Myrtle Beach AFB, South Carolina, 15 May 1971 – 10 June 1992

Operated from King Fahd International Airport, Saudi Arabia, 15 August 1990 – 2 August 1991

- Eielson AFB, Alaska, 10 October 2019 -

== Survivor ==
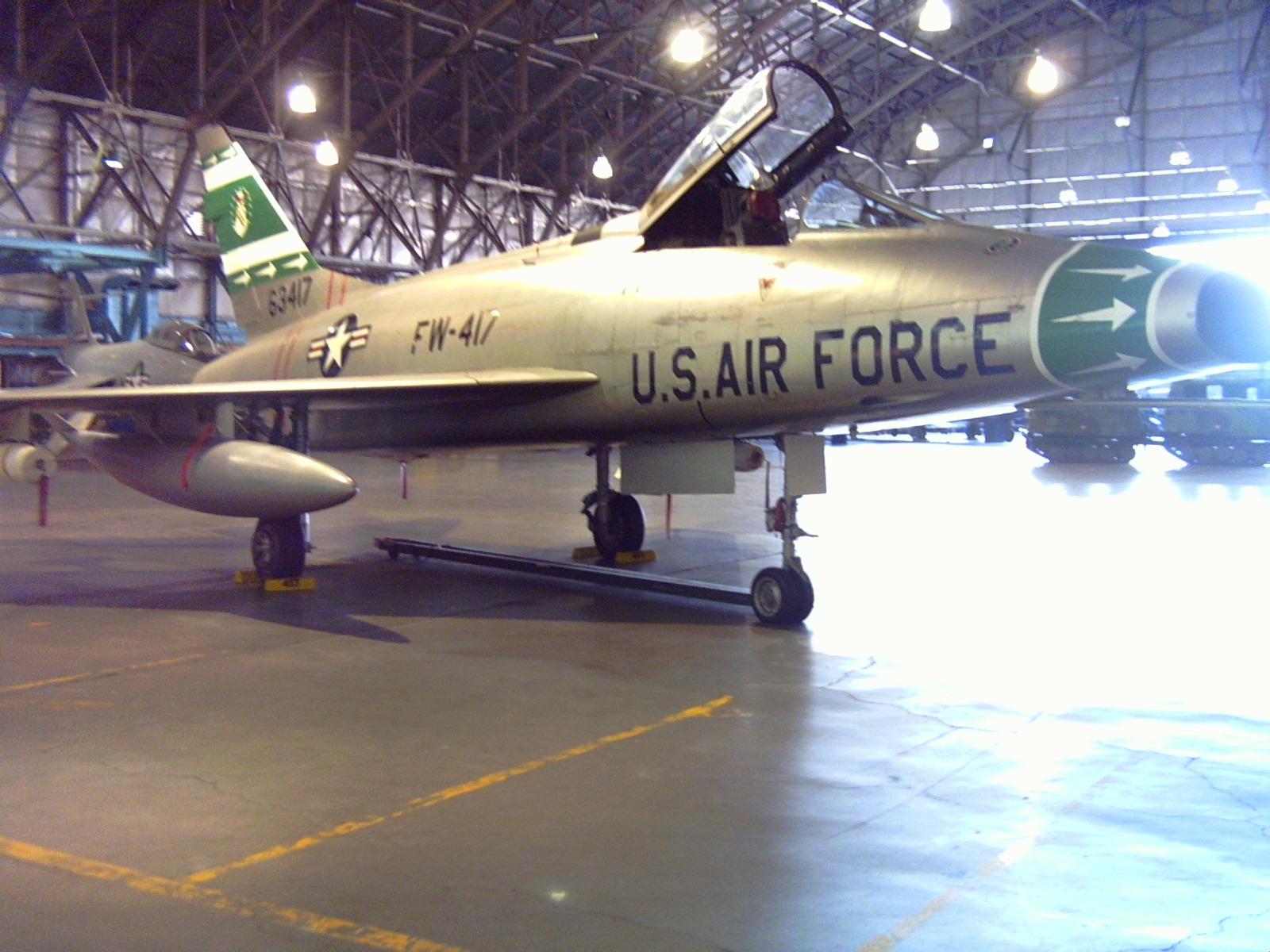
56-3417, F-100D-86-NA painted in its original 356th TFS, 354th TFW colors

Aircraft number 56-3417, F-100D-86-NA (formerly F-100D-85-NH), with High Wire Mods, is on display at Wings Over the Rockies Air and Space Museum, Denver, Colorado. It was restored with USAF Museum approval from its GF-100D paint scheme, plain aluminum paint with the "O-" on its tail, to its original "Green Demons" colors.
