= 612th Tactical Fighter Squadron =

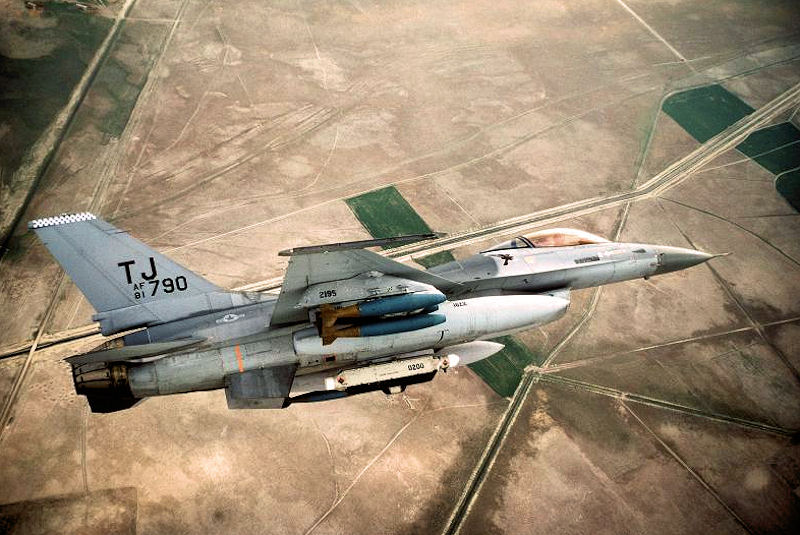
- Squadron F-16A Fighting Falcon (Note: The closest aircraft is General Dynamics F-16A Block 15H Fighting Falcon, serial 81-790 carrying Mark 82 bombs on its wing pylons and an AN/ALQ-131 electronic countermeasures pod on the centerline over the Konya Range on 7 May 1986. This plane was sent to the Aerospace Maintenance and Regeneration Center (AMARC) on 26 June 1996. Baugher, Joe (3 March 2023). "1981 USAF Serial Numbers". Joe Baugher.)
- Active: 1943-1945, 1949-1951, 1954-1991
- Country: United States
- Branch: United States Air Force
- Role: Fighter
- Nickname: Fighting 612th
- Engagements: European Theater of Operations; Vietnam War
- Decorations: Distinguished Unit Citation; Presidential Unit Citation; Air Force Outstanding Unit Award with Combat "V" Device; Air Force Outstanding Unit Award; Vietnamese Gallantry Cross with Palm

Insignia
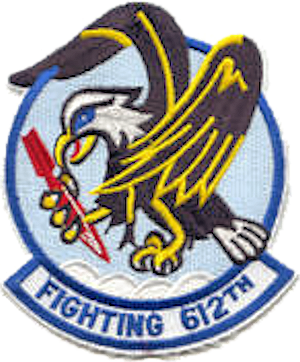
- 612th Tactical Fighter Squadron patch showing squadron emblem (Note: Approved 15 September 1955. Description: On a light sky blue disc, within a border Air Force blue, a fighting American bald eagle, dark brown, wings highlighted Air Force yellow, eyeball green, pupil black, with white highlight, beak and feet Air Force yellow, detail dark brown, talons black, highlights white, tongue red, head and tail feathers white, outlined black; the eagle carrying a large red bomb in his right talons, in base a cloud white.)

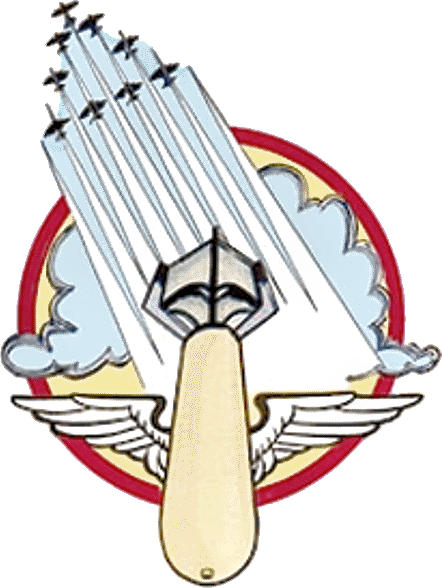
- 612th Bombardment Squadron Emblem (Note: The squadron had an earlier emblem portraying the squadron mascot, "Mangler." Closway, p. 36)
- ETO Fuselage Code: FN

The 612th Tactical Fighter Squadron is an inactive United States Air Force unit. It was last assigned to the 401st Tactical Fighter Wing at Torrejon Air Base, Spain, where it was inactivated on 1 October 1991.

The squadron was first activated during World War II as the 612th Bombardment Squadron. After training in the United States it moved to England, where it participated in the strategic bombing campaign against Germany. It earned two Distinguished Unit Citations for combat action. Following V-E Day, the squadron was inactivated in England. It was briefly active in the reserves from 1947, becoming a corollary unit in 1949. In the spring of 1951, it was mobilized for the Korean War and its personnel were used to fill out other units before the squadron was inactivated

The squadron was redesignated the 612th Fighter-Bomber Squadron and activated in 1954 at Alexandria Air Force Base, Louisiana. In 1965 in moved to Japan, but most of the squadron was assigned to a detachment located in Vietnam. In 1971 it formally moved to Vietnam for a few months before it moved to Torrejon Air Base, Spain, where it continued fighter operations until inactivating in 1991.

== History ==
=== World War II ===
==== Organization and training for combat ====
The 612th Bombardment Squadron was activated March 1943 at Ephrata Army Air Base Washington as one of the original squadrons of the 401st Bombardment Group. The initial cadre for the squadron was drawn from the 395th Bombardment Group at Ephrata and the 383d Bombardment Group at Rapid City Army Air Field, South Dakota. The cadre soon departed for Orlando Army Air Base, Florida, where they conducted simulated combat missions with the Army Air Forces School of Applied Tactics out of Brooksville Army Air Field.

The ground echelon moved to Geiger Field, Washington in May 1943 and to Great Falls Army Air Base, Mount in July. At Great Falls the first combat crews were assigned to the squadron. In the final stage of training the squadrons dispersed with the 612th remaining at Great Falls, while the other squadrons trained at bases in Montana and Wyoming.

After completing training the ground echelon left for overseas on 19 October 1943. After staging at Camp Shanks, New York they embarked on the RMS Queen Mary and sailed on 27 October disembarking at Greenock on the Firth of Clyde on 3 November 1943. The air echelon staged for deployment at Scott Field, Illinois then flew to England under the control of Air Transport Command via Newfoundland, Iceland and Scotland.

==== Combat in the European Theater of Operations ====
On arrival in England, half of the 401st group's aircrews were immediately reassigned to the 351st Bombardment Group. The rest of the squadron became part of Eighth Air Force at RAF Deenethorpe. The 612th became part of the 92d Combat Bombardment Wing of the 1st Bombardment Division. Its tail code was Triangle-S.

On 26 November the 612th flew its first combat mission against Bremen, Germany. The 401st group did not suffer the combat loss of an airplane until its ninth mission on 30 December. The squadron operated chiefly against strategic targets, bombing industries, submarine facilities, shipyards, missile sites, marshalling yards, and airfields. On 11 January 1944 the squadron was in the lead group of the 1st Bombardment Division in an attack against aircraft manufacturing facilities at Oschersleben, Germany. Although the bombers were able to attack, poor weather conditions prevented the division from receiving effective fighter cover. For over three hours the bomber formation suffered more than 400 attacks by Luftwaffe fighters, including air-to-air rocket attacks. Despite these attacks the unit continued its attack and struck a telling blow against German aircraft production for which the squadron was awarded the Distinguished Unit Citation (DUC).

A little over a month later, on 20 February, the squadron earned its second DUC for an attack on the Erla Maschinenwerke aircraft manufacturing facilities in Leipzig, Germany. Despite fighter attacks and battle damage to the 612th's planes, 100% of the unit's bombs fell within 1000 feet of the aiming point. Beginning in October 1944, the unit concentrated its attacks on Axis oil reserves.

In addition to strategic missions, squadron operations included attacks on transportation, airfields, and fortifications prior to the Normandy invasion. On D-Day the 612th attacked Normandy beachhead areas dropping bombs five minutes before troops landed. The following month it provided close air support for the breakthrough at Saint-Lô, it also supported the siege of Brest in August and Operation Market Garden in September. During the Battle of the Bulge in December 1944 and January 1945, the unit attacked transportation and communications in the battle area. It supported airborne forces involved in Operation Varsity in March 1945.

The squadron flew its last combat mission on 20 April 1945 against Brandenberg. It had flown 254 combat missions from Deenethorpe airfield. After V-E Day, the squadron flew missions to Linz, Austria to evacuate British and French prisoners of war. It also flew "Trolley" sightseeing missions at low level, flying ground support personnel over the Ruhr and Frankfurt am Main to see the damage that had been done as a result of their efforts.

The unit was alerted for redeployment to the Pacific Theater and the last plane departed Deenethorpe in early June. The ground echelon sailed on the RMS Queen Elizabeth on the fifth. Upon arrival in the US, personnel were granted thirty days leave, reassembling at Sioux Falls Army Air Field, South Dakota, but plans had changed and personnel were either transferred to Boeing B-29 Superfortress units or processed for discharge and the squadron was inactivated.

=== Reserve operations ===
The squadron was activated at Brooks Field (later Brooks Air Force Base), Texas in June 1947 as a unit of the reserves. It trained under the supervision of the 178th AAF Base Unit (later 2593d Air Force Reserve Training Center) of Air Defense Command (ADC). It is not clear whether or not the squadron was fully staffed or equipped. In 1948, Continental Air Command assumed responsibility for managing reserve and Air National Guard units from ADC. President Truman's reduced 1949 defense budget required reductions in the number of units in the Air Force. As a result, in June 1949, the 612th moved to Biggs Air Force Base and became a corollary unit of Strategic Air Command's 97th Bombardment Wing, which was stationed there. The May 1949 Air Force Reserve program had called for this new type of unit, which was a reserve unit integrated with an active duty unit. The plan was viewed as the best method to train reservists by mixing them with an existing regular unit to perform duties alongside the regular unit.

All reserve corollary units were mobilized for the Korean war. The 612th was called up on 1 May 1951. Its personnel were used as fillers for other organizations and it was inactivated on 25 June.

=== Fighter operations ===
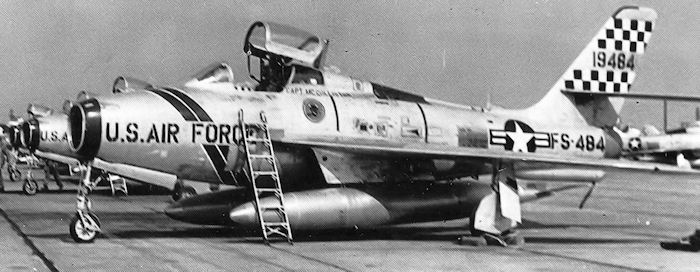
401st Group F-84F Thunderstreak (Note: Closest aircraft is Republic F-84F Thunderstreak, serial 51-9484. This plane was transferred to the Illinois Air National Guard in 1957, but was returned to the regular air force in 1963 to equip the 15th Tactical Fighter Wing until it received McDonnell F-4C Phantom IIs. Baugher, Joe (6 May 2023). "1951 USAF Serial Numbers". Joe Baugher.)

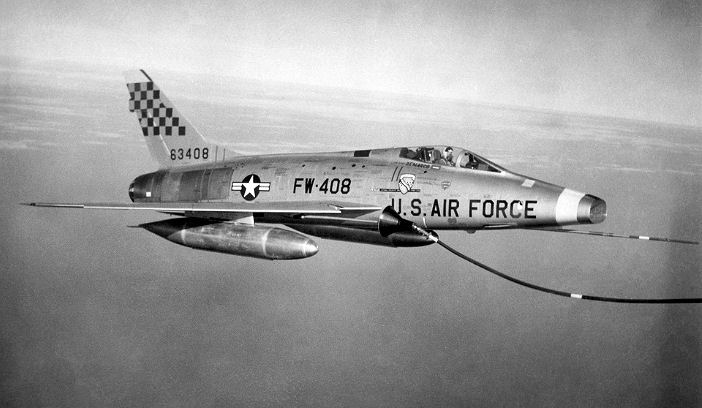
401st Wing F-100D (Note: Aircraft is North American F-100D-85-NH Super Sabre, serial 56-3408. Taken about 1960.)

The squadron was redesignated the 612th Fighter-Bomber Squadron and activated at Alexandria Air Force Base, Louisiana in February 1954. Initially equipped with North American F-86 Sabres, then with Republic F-84F Thunderstreaks, by 1957 the squadron was flying North American F-100 Super Sabres as the 612th Tactical Fighter Squadron. The squadron participated in firepower demonstrations military exercises and maneuvers, It deployed aircraft and personnel to Europe and the Middle East to support NATO. During the Cuban Missile Crisis, the squadron operated from Homestead Air Force Base, Florida. By 1965, however, deployments had begun to the Pacific and Southeast Asia.

The squadron moved to Misawa Air Base, Japan in November 1965, where it was assigned to the 39th Air Division. From Misawa, the squadron deployed aircraft and crews to Detachment 2 of the 39th Division, located at Kunsan Air Base, South Korea. In 1966, the squadron deployed to Phan Rang Air Base, South Viet Nam. On 10 October, Detachment 1 of the squadron was formed at Phan Rang, where it came under the operational control of the 35th Tactical Fighter Wing. Although the squadron continued to exist as a paper unit at Misawa, all of its resources were assigned to the detachment, which engaged in combat operations in Vietnam. Between June 1967 and April 1969, the detachment operated from Phu Cat Air Base under the control of the 37th Tactical Fighter Wing, before returning to Phan Rang.

In January 1968, the 39th Air Division was inactivated and the 475th Tactical Fighter Wing moved to Misawa. The squadron was reassigned, but remained a paper unit until March 1971, when it moved without personnel and equipment and replaced Detachment 1 at Phan Rang. The American presence in Vietnam was being reduced, however, and the squadron's time at Phan Rang was limited. Combat operations ceased in late June, and on 15 July the squadron moved without personnel and equipment for the second time.

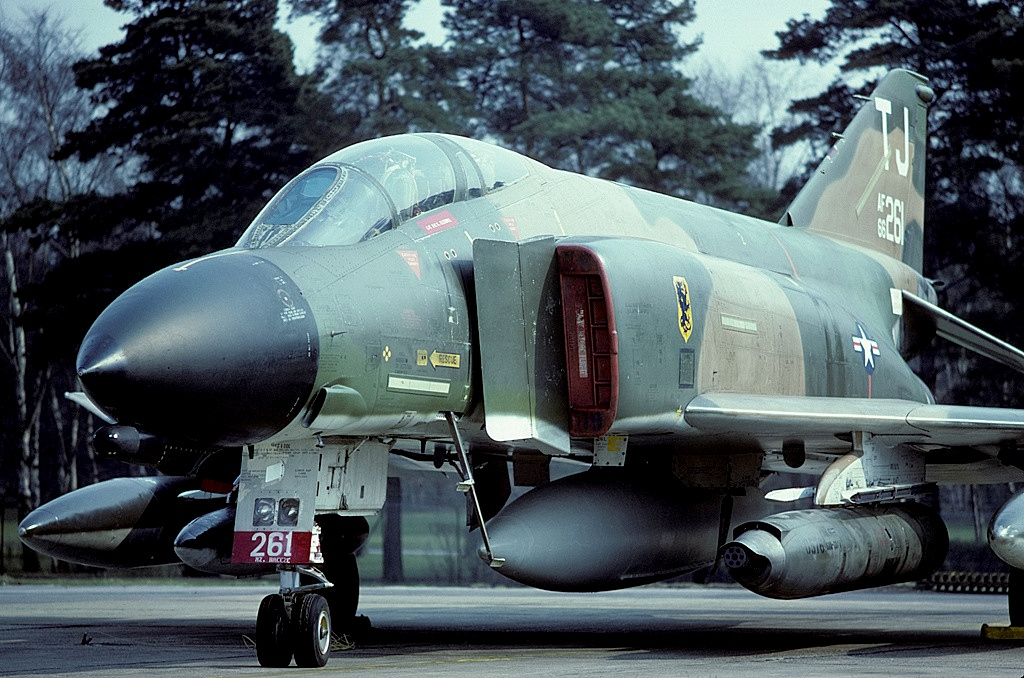
401st Wing F-4D Phantom II (Note: Aircraft is McDonnell F-4D-29-MC Phantom II, serial 66-0261. This airplane was transferred to the Air National Guard in 1980 and to the AMARC on 8 January 1990. It was sold for scrap on 19 May 2000. Baugher, Joe (29 April 2023). "1966 USAF Serial Numbers". Joe Baugher.)

The squadron moved on paper to rejoin the 401st Wing at Torrejon Air Base, Spain in July 1971, replacing the 308th Tactical Fighter Squadron and assuming its personnel and McDonnell F-4 Phantom IIs. The squadron deployed to advanced locations in Europe and the Middle East, where it stood alert status. In 1983, the squadron converted to the General Dynamics F-16 Fighting Falcon. It deployed its forces to Incirlik Air Base, Turkey in 1990, where they formed the 612th Tactical Fighter Squadron (Provisional) under the 7440th Composite Wing (Provisional). After return to Torrejon the squadron was inactivated in the fall of 1991 as the United States removed its combat units permanently stationed in Spain.

== Lineage ==
- Constituted as the 612th Bombardment Squadron (Heavy) on 20 March 1943

Activated on 1 April 1943
Redesignated 612th Bombardment Squadron, Heavy ca. 1 November 1943
Inactivated on 28 August 1945

- Redesignated 612th Bombardment Squadron, Very Heavy on 27 May 1947

Activated in the reserve on 26 June 1947
Redesignated 612th Bombardment Squadron, Medium on 27 June 1949
Ordered to active service on 1 May 1951
Inactivated on 25 June 1951

- Redesignated 612th Fighter-Bomber Squadron on 24 November 1953

Activated on 8 February 1954
Redesignated 612th Tactical Fighter Squadron on 1 July 1958
Inactivated on 1 October 1991

=== Assignments ===
- 401st Bombardment Group, 1 April 1943 – 28 August 1945
- 401st Bombardment Group, 26 June 1947 – 25 June 1951
- 401st Fighter-Bomber Group, 8 February 1954
- 401st Fighter-Bomber Wing (later Tactical Fighter Wing), 25 September 1957
- 39th Air Division, 3 November 1965
- 475th Tactical Fighter Wing, 15 January 1968
- 35th Tactical Fighter Wing, 15 March 1971
- 401st Tactical Fighter Wing, 15 July 1971 – 1 October 1991

=== Stations ===
- Ephrata Army Air Base, Washington, 1 April 1943
- Geiger Field, Washington, 4 June 1943
- Great Falls Army Air Base, Montana, 8 July 1943 – 19 October 1943
- RAF Deenethorpe (AAF-128), England, 4 November 1943 – 20 June 1945
- Sioux Falls Army Air Field, South Dakota, c. 1 August 1945 – 28 August 1945
- Brooks Field (later Brooks Air Force Base), Texas, 26 June 1947
- Biggs Air Force Base, Texas, 27 June 1949 – 25 June 1951
- Alexandria Air Force Base (later England Air Force Base), Louisiana, 8 February 1954
- Misawa Air Base, Japan, 3 November 1965
- Phan Rang Air Base, Republic of Vietnam, 15 March 1971
- Torrejon Air Base, Spain, 5 July 1971 – 1 October 1991

=== Aircraft ===
- Boeing B-17 Flying Fortress, 1943–1945
- North American F-86 Sabre, 1954–1955
- Republic F-84 Thunderjet, 1954–1957
- North American F-100 Super Sabre, 1957–1971
- McDonnell Douglas F-4 Phantom II, 1971–1983
- General Dynamics F-16 Fighting Falcon, 1983–1991

=== Awards and campaigns ===
| Award streamer | Award | Dates | Notes |
|---|---|---|---|
| | Distinguished Unit Citation | 11 January 1944 | Germany, 612th Bombardment Squadron |
| | Distinguished Unit Citation | 20 February 1944 | Germany, 612th Bombardment Squadron |
| | Presidential Unit Citation | 10 October 1966 – 10 April 1967 | 612th Tactical Fighter Squadron |
| | Air Force Outstanding Unit Award with Combat "V" Device | 15 March 1971 – 25 June 1971 | 612th Tactical Fighter Squadron |
| | Air Force Outstanding Unit Award | 1 January 1963 – 31 December 1963 | 612th Tactical Fighter Squadron |
| | Air Force Outstanding Unit Award | 8 August 1964 – 15 November 1964 | 612th Tactical Fighter Squadron |
| | Air Force Outstanding Unit Award | 1 July 1983–30 June 1985 | 612th Tactical Fighter Squadron |
| | Air Force Outstanding Unit Award | 1 April 1989–31 March 1991 | 612th Tactical Fighter Squadron |
| | Vietnamese Gallantry Cross with Palm | 29 June 1966 – 15 July 1971 | 612th Tactical Fighter Squadron (Note: In addition, Detachment 1 of the squadron was awarded a Presidential Unit Citation for the period 1 July 1968 – 31 December 1968, an Air Force Outstanding Unit Award with Combat "V" Device for the period 1 May 1966-30 September 1966 and three Vietnam Gallantry Crosses with palm. AF Pamphlet 900-2, Vol. 1, p. 438; AF Pamphlet 900-2, Vol. 2, p. 83) |

| Campaign Streamer | Campaign | Dates | Notes |
|---|---|---|---|
| | Air Offensive, Europe | 4 November 1943 – 5 June 1944 | 612th Bombardment Squadron |
| | Normandy | 6 June 1944 – 24 July 1944 | 612th Bombardment Squadron |
| | Northern France | 25 July 1944 – 14 September 1944 | 612th Bombardment Squadron |
| | Ardennes-Alsace | 16 December 1944 – 25 January 1945 | 612th Bombardment Squadron |
| | Rhineland | 15 September 1944 – 21 March 1945 | 612th Bombardment Squadron |
| | Central Europe | 2 March 1944 – 21 May 1945 | 612th Bombardment Squadron |
| | Commando Hunt V | 15 March 1971 – 14 May 1971 | 612th Tactical Fighter Squadron |
| | Commando Hunt VI | 15 May 1971 – 15 July 1971 | 612th Tactical Fighter Squadron |

== See also ==
- List of United States Air Force fighter squadrons
- General Dynamics F-16 Fighting Falcon operators
- List of F-4 Phantom II operators
- List of F-100 units of the United States Air Force
- List of F-86 Sabre units
- List of B-29 Superfortress operators
- B-17 Flying Fortress units of the United States Army Air Forces
