= 475th Air Base Wing =

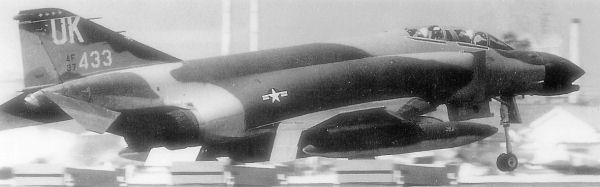
- F-4 Phantom of the 356 TFS at Misawa Japan, 1968 (Note: Aircraft is McDonnell F-4C-16-MC Phantom II serial 63-7433.) 1968
- Active: 1948–1949; 1968–1971; 1971–1992
- Country: United States
- Branch: United States Air Force
- Role: Base support
- Motto: In Proelio Gaudete (Latin for 'Be Joyful in Battle')
- Decorations: Air Force Outstanding Unit Award

Insignia
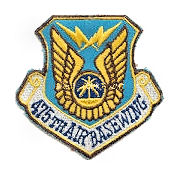
- Patch with 475th Air Base Wing emblem

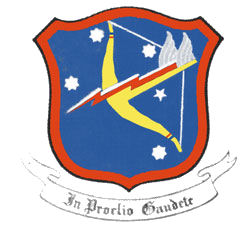
- 475th Tactical Fighter Wing emblem (Note: Approved for 475th Fighter Group on 26 November 1956. Maurer, Combat Units, p. 349. Used by the wing from 1967.)

The 475th Air Base Wing is an inactive United States Air Force unit. Its last duty station was at Yokota Air Base, Japan, where it was inactivated on 1 April 1992.

A non-flying wing, the wing's mission at Yokota was to perform host unit missions. The wing had no numbered flying squadrons, although it did operate a few T-39 Sabreliner aircraft and UH-1 Huey helicopters. It was absorbed by the 374th Airlift Wing under the "one base-one wing" organizational concept.

== History ==
See: 475th Fighter Group for associated history and lineage information

The 475th Fighter Wing was activated in 1948 as part of the Wing Base USAF reorganization, assigned to the 315th Air Division of Far East Air Forces where it performed postwar occupation duty. The wing was one of several occupation units in Japan, and was inactivated on 1 April 1949 at Ashiya Airfield due to budget reductions.

=== Cold War ===
In January 1968, the 475th Tactical Fighter Wing was activated at Misawa Air Base, Japan, replacing the 39th Air Division as the host unit, with the 439th Combat Support Group being replaced by the 475th Combat Support Group that controlled the base support units. At Misawa, the wing trained for offensive and reconnaissance operations. Initial assigned operational squadrons of the wing were:

- 67th Tactical Fighter Squadron (15 January 1968 – 15 March 1971) (F-4D) (UP)
- 356th Tactical Fighter Squadron (15 January 1968 – 15 March 1971) (F-4D) (UK)
- 391st Tactical Fighter Squadron (22 July 1968 – 28 February 1971) (F-4D) (UD)
- 421st Tactical Fighter Squadron (Attached) (23 April 1969 – 25 Jun 1969) (F-4E) (LC)
- 45th Tactical Reconnaissance Squadron* (15 January 1968 – 15 March 1971) (RF-101C)
- 612th Tactical Fighter Squadron* (15 January 1968 – 15 March 1971) (F-100D)

The 45th TRS and 612th TFS were unmanned during their entire assignment, as squadron was on deployed status to bases in South Vietnam (The 45th TRS deployed to Tan Son Nhut Air Base; the 612th TFS at Phù Cát Air Base).

From Misawa, aircraft and personnel of the 67th, 356th and 391st TFS rotated six aircraft every ten days to Kusan and Taegu Air Bases in South Korea performing nuclear alert duty. On 16 May 1968, the M8.3 Tokachi earthquake caused over $1 million worth of damage to Misawa Air Base. Air Force fighter operations ceased at Misawa in early 1971, and the wing phased down operations. All flying resources were transferred to Kusan Air Base South Korea for the 3d Tactical Fighter Wing, and the wing was inactivated on 15 March, being replaced by the 6112th Air Base Group as Misawa was phased down for reconstruction.

After a brief period of inactivation, the wing was reactivated as the 475th Air Base Wing on 1 November 1971 at Yokota Air Base, Japan, replacing the 6100th Air Base Wing. At Yokota, the wing inherited a huge support complex, with some 47 sub-locations in all parts of Japan, including operation of Yokota and Tachikawa Air Bases, Fuchu and Chitose Air Stations, and numerous housing complexes within the Tokyo area. In 1972 the wing's components were as below:

HQ 475th Air Base Wing (Yokota AB)

475ABW Flight Operations (operating 3 CT-39 Sabreliners; "Orient Express")

  - 556th Reconnaissance Squadron
  - 475th Consolidated Aircraft Maintenance Squadron
  - 475th Supply Squadron
  - 475th Security Police Squadron
  - 475th Transportation Squadron
  - 475th Civil Engineering Squadron
  - 475th Services Squadron
  - 34th Air Base Squadron (Grant Heights, Nerima, Tokyo)
  - 37th Air Base Squadron (Fuchu AS, Fuchu, Tokyo)
  - 331st Air Base Squadron (Johnson FHA)
  - 475th Air Base Squadron (Tachikawa AB)
    - USAF Hospital, Tachikawa
  - 6120th Broadcasting Squadron (South Camp Drake, Asaka, Saitama)
  - 6123d Air Base Squadron (Chitose AS)
    - USAF Hospital, Chitose
  - OL-AA, 475th Air Base Wing (Shingu Wells, Hakata, Fukuoka)
    - USAF Hospital, Shingu Wells
  - OL-AB, 475th Air Base Wing (Misawa AB)
    - USAF Hospital, Misawa

At Yokota, the only operational flying squadron was the 556th Reconnaissance Squadron (formerly assigned to the 347th Tactical Fighter Wing at Yokota from 1968). The 556th was a highly specialized unit, employing modified C-130B-II, EB-57E electronic counter measures (ECM) aircraft and on occasion TDY C-130A-II and EC-97G Stratotankers. Only the EB-57E's carried the tail code GT, the C-130B-IIs and other aircraft being uncoded.

=== Post Vietnam era ===
The 556th RS was inactivated on 30 June 1972, after which the 475th supported a Royal Thai Air Force Fairchild C-123 Provider detachment which provided airlift support to the United Nations Command (Rear) of Fifth Air Force, which relocated its headquarters to Yokota in November 1974.

The 475th ABW also gradually closed down many of its widely dispersed installations, sites and facilities, consolidating them as well as assisting in the closing of Tachikawa Air Base in September 1977. On 1 October 1978, Military Airlift Command (MAC) established the 316th Tactical Airlift Group at Yokota, being supported by the 475th ABW. This was MAC's operational support airlift group in the Far East, with the 1403d Military Airlift Squadron flying a combination of CT-39As, C-12Fs, and C-21As which it obtained from various bases in PACAF, consolidating them at Yokota. On 1 October 1989, this unit was upgraded to a wing level and personnel redesignated as the 374th Tactical Airlift Wing, which was moved from Clark Air Base, Philippines in a name-only redesignation.

The 475th ABW was inactivated on 1 April 1992 as part of a consolidation effort, being replaced as host unit at Yokota by the 374th, which was redesignated 374th Airlift Wing same date.

=== Lineage ===
- Established as the 475th Fighter Wing on 10 August 1948

Activated on 18 August 1948
Inactivated 1 April 1949

- Redesignated 475th Tactical Fighter Wing and activated on 21 December 1967 (not organized)

Organized on 15 January 1968
Inactivated 15 March 1971

- Redesignated 475th Air Base Wing on 20 October 1971

Activated 1 November 1971
Inactivated 1 April 1992, personnel and equipment consolidated into 374th Airlift Wing

=== Assignments ===
- 315th Air Division, 18 Aug 1948 – 1 Apr 1949
- Pacific Air Forces, 21 December 1967 (not organized)
- Fifth Air Force, 15 Jan 1968 – 15 Mar 1971
- Fifth Air Force, 1 Nov 1971 – 1 Apr 1992

=== Components ===
Group

- 475th Fighter Group: 18 Aug 1948 – 1 Apr 1949

Squadrons

- 16th Tactical Reconnaissance Squadron: 16 Mar 1970 – 15 Feb 1971, attached 16–22 Feb 1971.
- 45th Tactical Reconnaissance Squadron: 15 Jan 1968 – 15 Mar 1971 (not operational).
- 67th Tactical Fighter Squadron: 15 Jan 1968 – 15 Mar 1971
- 356th Tactical Fighter Squadron: 15 Jan 1968 – 15 Mar 1971
- 391st Tactical Fighter Squadron: 22 Jul 1968 – 28 Feb 1971
- 421st Tactical Fighter Squadron: attached 23 Apr-25 Jun 1969
- 556th Reconnaissance Squadron: 1 Nov 1971 – 30 Jun 1972
- 612th Tactical Fighter Squadron: 15 Jan 1968 – 15 Mar 1971 (not operational).

=== Stations ===
- Itazuke Airfield, Japan, 28 August 1948
- Ashiya Airfield, Japan, 25 March – 1 April 1949
- Misawa Air Base, Japan 15 January 1968 – 15 March 1971
- Yokota Air Base, Japan, 1 November 1971 – 1 April 1992

=== Aircraft ===
- F-51 Mustang, 1948–1949
- F-100 Super Sabre, 1968
- F-4D Phantom II, 1968–1971
- RF-4C Phantom II, 1970–1971
- C-130 Hercules, 1971–1972
- C-123 Provider, 1971–1976
