= Project High Wire =

USAF aircraft modernization program

See also Project High Wire upgrades on F-100s

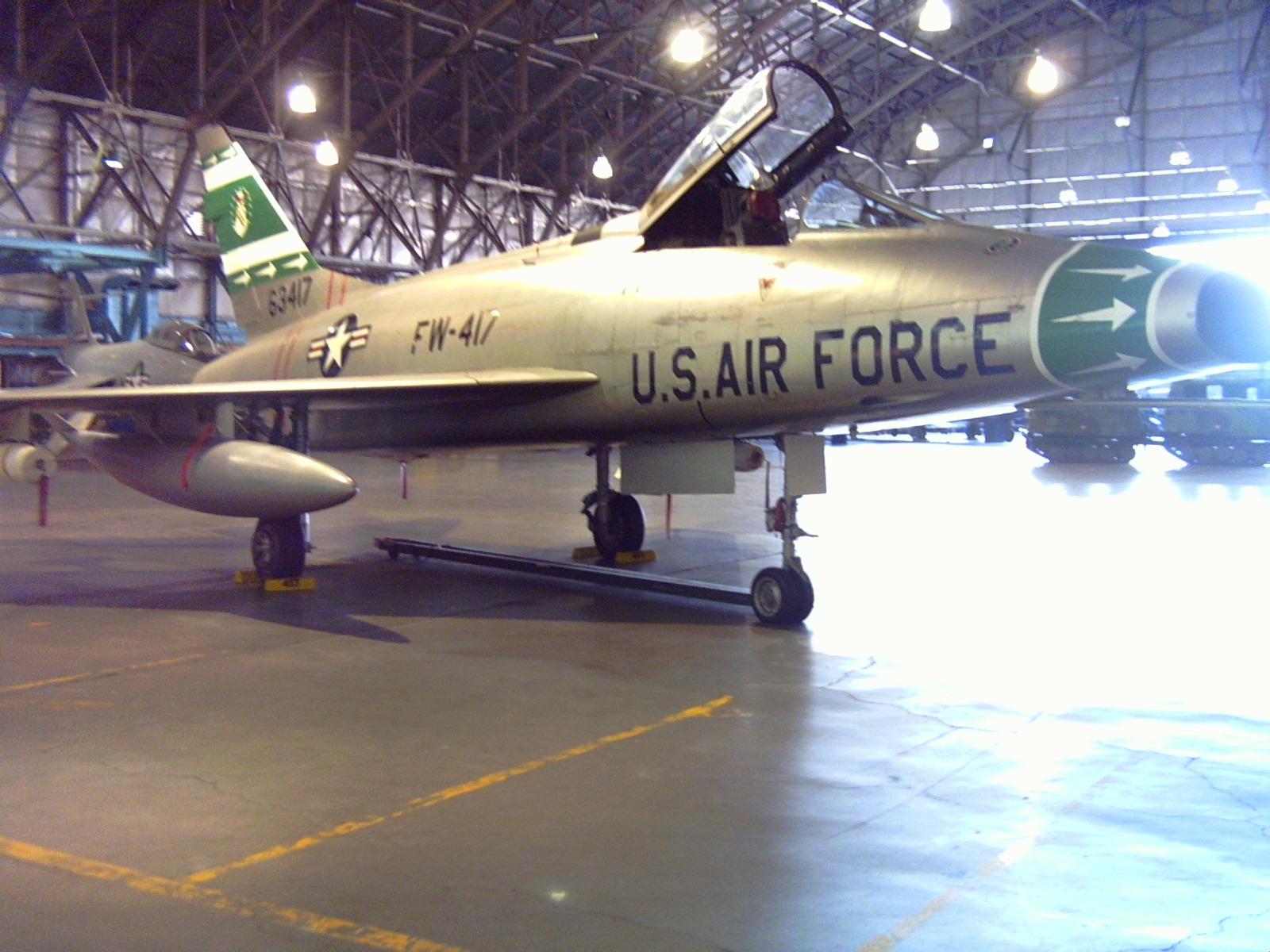
F-100D Super Sabre, ser. no. 56-3417, High Wire Modification F-100D-86-NH, restored and on display at Wings Over the Rockies Air and Space Museum, Denver, Colorado

Project High Wire was a United States Air Force (USAF) modernization programme for selected North American Aviation F-100C, D and F Super Sabres that were still in active inventory. It consisted of two detailed modification groups; significant electrical rewiring upgrade, and heavy aircraft maintenance and IRAN (inspect and repair as necessary) upgrade. These upgrades began in 1962.

Rewiring upgrade operation consisted of replacing old wiring and harnesses with improved maintainable designs while heavy maintenance and IRAN included new kits, modifications, standardized configurations, repairs, replacements and complete refurbishment.

== F-100Cs ==
Source: USAF F-100C Super Sabre - Flight Manual - Technical Order Upgrades T.O. 1F-100C(I)-1S-65 2 February 1971

The F-100Cs first saw action in March 1954 before officially entering USAF service on 14 July 1955 with the 450th Fighter Wing, Foster AFB. The aircraft was known for its efficacy as a platform for nuclear toss bombing due to its high top speed, although it shared a number of flaws with the F-100As. Key changes introduced by the modification program included changes in maintenance procedures, major wiring harnesses, IRAN^{i} upgrade, and additional avionics. By 1968, Project High Wire implemented the following upgrades:

- Improved nose gear ground safety lock instructions
- Improved use of 200 US gal (760 L). drop tanks and installation on outboard pylons
- Restriction on takeoff with partially filled 450 US gal (1,700 L). drop tanks
- Improved use of braking system with thermal expansion after high altitudes to prevent excessive pressures and system failures.
- Improve instructions on all ejection seat systems at low altitude bailouts

The modernization programme adopted in 1970 involved 3 simultaneous operations: an electrical rewiring operation, and a heavy maintenance improvements and IRAN operations. Also including design changes, safety instructions, aircraft characteristics, normal and emergency operations, and overall aircraft and documentation standardization.

=== List of changes and rescinded(R) ===
- Loose strap end securing
- Main gear tire failure landings
- g limitations - R
- Spin recovery and canopy warning light
- Additional information on external store index system
- Oxygen mask hose rerouting
- Warning light on fuel shutoff switch – R
- Additional loading configuration for Mk-82 and Snakeye I (Mk-82 w/drag fins) bombs
- "CAUTION" note on tail skid
- In-flight refueling ready light
- Addition stores index numbers
- Landing pattern usage
- A/A37U-15 Tow Target index numbers
- Turn-and-slip indicator information
- Additional store information
- Store index numbers for MK-82 bomb with 36-inch (910 mm) fuze extender
- Store index numbers for Destructor M117D
- Dispensing of C/B munitions – R
- Store index numbers airspeed limits for CBU-24
- Bomb arming switch information
- Salvo of armed bombs
- Flight limits for BLU-52/B bomb (chemical)
- BLU-32/B Fire Bomb un-finned
- Modification of oil pressure relief valve
- Information of AIM-9E air-to-air missile
- 90 degree rotation of A/ARC-34
- Information of SUU-20/A Practice Dispenser
- Relocation of sight selector unit
- Installation of data recording system

=== 1970 High Wire Supplementals ===
- High stresses in the N2 Compressor of the J57-21, -21A engines
- Installation of 450 US gal (1,700 L). air refueling drop tanks and gauges
- Installation of in-flight refueling probe extension
- Installation of AIM-9B provisions
- Installation of true airspeed indicator
- Provisions for in-flight refueling of external tanks
- Installation of EPR system
- Installation of ILS AN/ARN-31 system
- Removal of supplementary oil tank
- Standardization of takeoff trim setting
- 90 degree rotation of AN/ARC-34
- installation of canopy breakaway tool
- modification of dispenser and rocket system
- installation of variable intensity light control
- automatic electrical caging – A-4 sight
- deactivation of attitude indication system during ground maintenance
- installation of fuel system shutoff valve fail light
- installation of relay in gun camera circuitry
- installation of exterior floodlights
- installation of data recording equipment
- installation of cockpit selectable hi-lo drag bomb capability
- installation of anticollision lights
- relocation of variable rocket depression unit
- automatic throttle positioning in case of throttle linkage failure
- modification of fuel control and addition of extended range afterburner
- modification of engine fuel pump transfer valve
- modification of oil pressure relief valve

=== 1971 High Wire Supplementals ===
- Information on arresting systems and approach end engagements
- Information of fuel system shutoff valve
- Flight limits on SUU-20/A practice dispensers with BDU-33/B, -33A/B, -33B/B bombs
- Information on SUU-20 series
- Information on LAU-3 Rocket Launcher
- Operating procedures on HBU-2B/A Lap Belt
- Information on minimum altitude of attempting an air start
- Information on wind-blast injury during ejections
- High stresses in the N2 Compressor
- Information on pitch damper system deactivation
- Information on partially filled 355 US gal (1,340 L). and 275 US gal (1,040 L). drop tanks

=== Block Numbers for C-model High Wire Mods ===
Project High Wire modifications were extensive and dictated a change in the block number assignment, i.e.: F-100C-10-NH to F-100C-11-NH

Block No.s.......S/N Range......................Block number change
F-100C-1-NA .... AF 53-1709 to –1778 ... F-100C-2-NA

and 54-1740 to –1769

F-100C-6-NA .... AF 54-1770 to –1814
F-100C-11-NH ... AF 55-2709 to –2733
F-100C-16-NA ... AF 54-1615 to –1859
F-100C-21-NA ... AF 54-1860 to –1969
F-100C-26-NA ... AF 54-1970 to –2120

Note: NA – Los Angeles, CA and NH – Columbus, OH

== F-100Ds and Fs ==
Source: USAF F-100D, F Super Sabre - Flight Manual - Technical Order: 1F-100D(I)-1S-120 dated 12 January 1970

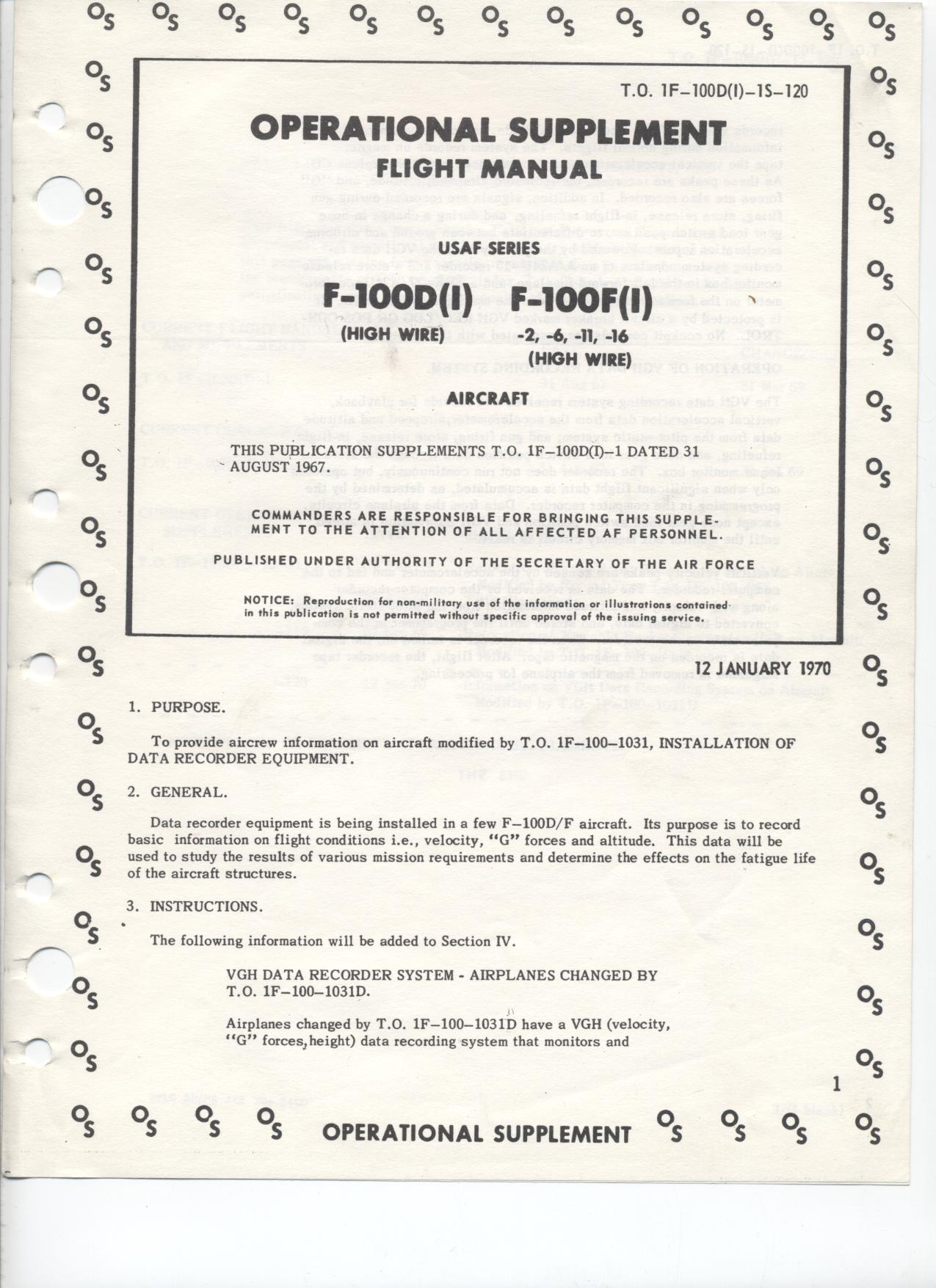
USAF F-100D(I) Flight Manual, T.O. 1F-100D(I)-1S-120

The F-100D was also a fighter-bomber but an improved version of the F-100C. One of its notable features was the wing outfitted with an increased root chord, which expanded the total wing area to 400.18 square feet. It also has landing flaps, which gave the aircraft its crank-wing trailing edge - one of its distinguishing features. While the aircraft's first aerial demonstration performance ended in disaster after the plane exploded, it still went on to become the most celebrated and widely produced variant of the F-100.

Project Highwire modified approximately 700 F-100D models. The changes required all new manuals (TOs)^{a} and incremented (i.e. -85 to -86) block numbers. All later production models, especially the F models, included earlier High Wire mods. New manuals included colored illustrations.

=== Base Project High Wire ===
This upgrade was to provide aircrew information on aircraft for installation of Data recorder (DR) equipment. DR is to record basic information on flight conditions i.e., velocity, G-force, and altitude. This data will be used to study the results of various mission requirements and determine the effects on the fatigue life of the aircraft structures:

- VGH^{b} A/A24U-10 Recorder
- Magnetic tape media
- Records during gun firing, store release, in-flight refueling, change in nose gear load switch position
- Powered by the primary bus
- TRK-77/A24U Accelerometer
- VGH REC/LDG POS CONTROL, no cockpit controls

==== Other 1970 changes ====
Includes previous T.O. -1S-nnn supplemental upgrades, as nnn listed below:

- -119 Relocation of Sight Selector Unit and relocation of Variable Rocket Depression Unit
- -118 Information on ECM Pod QRC^{c}-160-8 (AN/ALQ-87)
- -117 Information on variety of ordnance and special stores
- -116 Classified
- -115 For F-100Fs
- -114 Classified
- -112 Modified Oil Pressure Relief Valve for J-57
- -111 Relocation of Fuel Boost Pump and test switch
- -110 CBU-42/A authorization
- -109 BLU-32/B Firebomb Unfinned
- -108 Information on CBU-37/A

=== Initial High Wire Upgrades ===
31 August 1967 - 15 December 1969

A modernization programme of 2 simultaneous operations: an electrical rewiring operation, and a heavy maintenance improvements and IRAN operations. Also including design changes, safety instructions, aircraft characteristics, normal and emergency operations, and overall aircraft and documentation standardization. List of changes and rescinded(R):

- Loose strap end securing
- Main gear tire failure landings
- G limitations - R
- Spin recovery and canopy warning light
- Additional information on external store index system
- Oxygen mask hose rerouting
- Warning light on fuel shutoff switch - R
- Additional loading configuration for MK-82 and Snakeye I Bomb
- CAUTION note on tail skid
- In-flight refueling ready light
- Addition stores index numbers
- Landing pattern usage
- A/A37U-15 Tow Target index numbers
- Turn and slip indicator information
- Additional store information
- Store index numbers for MK-82 with 36-inch (910 mm) Fuse Extender
- Store index numbers for Destructor M117D
- Dispensing of C/B munitions - R
- Store index numbers airspeed limits for CBU-24
- Bomb arming switch information
- Salva of armed bombs
- Flight limits for BLU-52/B bomb
- BLU-32/B Fire Bomb un-finned
- Modification of oil pressure relief valve
- Information of AIM-9E air-to-air missile
- 90 degree rotation of A/ARC-34
- Information of SUU-20/A Practice Dispenser

=== 1970 High Wire Supplementals ===
- F-100 "G" restrictions
- High stresses in the N2 Compressor of the J57-21, -21A engines
- Installation of 450 US gal (1,700 L). air refueling drop tanks and gauges
- Installation of in-flight refueling probe extension
- Installation of AIM-9B provisions
- Installation of true airspeed indicator
- Provisions for in-flight refueling of external tanks
- Installation of EPR system
- Installation of ILS AN/ARN-31 system
- Removal of supplementary oil tank
- Standardization of takeoff trim setting
- 90 degree rotation of AN/ARC-34
- installation of canopy breakaway tool
- modification of dispenser and rocket system
- installation of variable intensity light control
- automatic electrical caging - A-4 sight
- deactivation of attitude indication system during ground maintenance
- installation of fuel system shutoff valve fail light
- installation of relay in gun camera circuitry
- installation of exterior floodlights
- installation of data recording equipment
- installation of cockpit selectable hi-lo drag bomb capability
- installation of anticollision lights
- relocation of variable rocket depression unit
- automatic throttle positioning in case of throttle linkage failure
- modification of fuel control and addition of extended range afterburner
- modification of engine fuel pump transfer valve
- modification of oil pressure relief valve

=== 1971 High Wire Supplementals ===
- Information on arresting systems and approach end engagements
- Information of fuel system shutoff valve
- Flight limits on SUU-20/A practice dispensers with BDU-33/B, -33A/B, -33B/B bombs
- Information on SUU-20 series
- Information on LAU-3 Rocket Launcher
- Operating procedures on HBU-2B/A Lap Belt
- Information on minimum altitude of attempting an air start
- Information on wind-blast injury during ejections
- High stresses in the N2 Compressor
- Information on pitch damper system deactivation
- Information on partially filled 355 US gal (1,340 L). and 275 US gal (1,040 L). drop tanks

=== Block Numbers for D-model High Wire Mods ===
D-model High Wire modifications were also performed on A-models and previously upgraded C-models. Most D-model modifications mandated the change in the block number of the aircraft; thus increasing the block number by one unit value, i.e.: F-100D-10-NH to F-100D-11-NH.

Serial Number Information:

Block No.s......S/N Range......Block number change
YF-100A-NA....52-5754/55
F-100A-01-NA 52-5756 ~ 5765
F-100A-05-NA 52-5766 ~ 5778
F-100A-10-NA 53-1529 ~ 1568
F-100A-15-NA 53-1569 ~ 1608
F-100A-20-NA 53-1609 ~ 1708
F-100C-01-NA 53-1709 ~ 1778..F-100C-02-NA (See F-100C High Wire Descriptions)
F-100C-05-NA 54-1740 ~ 1769..F-100C-06-NA
F-100C-10-NA 54-1770 ~ 1814..F-100C-11-NA
F-100C-15-NA 54-1815 ~ 1859..F-100C-16-NA
F-100C-20-NA 54-1860 ~ 1970..F-100C-21-NA
F-100C-25-NA 54-1971 ~ 2120..F-100C-26-NA
F-100C-10-NH 55-2709 ~ 2733..F-100C-11-NA
F-100D-01-NA 54-2121 ~ 2132
F-100D-05-NA 54-2133 ~ 2151
F-100D-10-NA 54-2152 ~ 2221
F-100D-15-NA 54-2222 ~ 2303
F-100D-20-NA 55-3501 ~ 3601
F-100D-25-NA 55-3602 ~ 3701..F-100D-26-NA
F-100D-30-NA 55-3702 ~ 3814..F-100D-31-NA
F-100D-35-NH 55-2734 ~ 2743
F-100D-40-NH 55-2744 ~ 2783
F-100D-45-NH 55-2784 ~ 2863..F-100D-46-NA
F-100D-50-NH 55-2864 ~ 2908..F-100D-51-NA
F-100D-55-NH 55-2909 ~ 2954..F-100D-56-NA
F-100D-60-NA 56-2903 ~ 2963..F-100D-61-NA
F-100D-65-NA 56-2963 ~ 3022..F-100D-66-NA
F-100D-70-NA 56-3023 ~ 3142..F-100D-71-NA
F-100D-75-NA 56-3143 ~ 3198..F-100D-76-NA
F-100D-80-NH 56-3351 ~ 3378..F-100D-81-NA
F-100D-85-NH 56-3379 ~ 3463..F-100D-86-NA
F-100D-90-NA 56-3199 ~ 3346..F-100D-91-NA
F-100F-01-NA 56-3725 ~ 3739..F-100F-02
F-100F-05-NA 56-3740 ~ 3769..F-100F-06
F-100F-10-NA 56-3770 ~ 3919..F-100F-11
F-100F-15-NA 56-3920 ~ 4019..F-100F-16..(~4016)
____________58-6975 ~ 6983
____________59-2558 ~ 2563
F-100F-20-NA 58-1205 ~ 1233..F-100F-21

Total Production 2,294

Note: NA - Los Angeles, CA and NH - Columbus, OH

== See also ==
- CAMPS Civil Aircraft Missile Protection System
- Electronic warfare
- Electronic countermeasures

=== Related ECMs ===
- AN/ALQ-99
- AN/ALQ-128
- AN/ALQ-144

== Footnotes ==
i. IRAN - Inspection and repair as necessary
a. TO - Technical Orders
b. VGH - Velocity-Gravity-Height
c. QRC - QuickReaction Capability
d.
