= 39th Air Division =

Inactive United States Air Force organization

39th Air Division

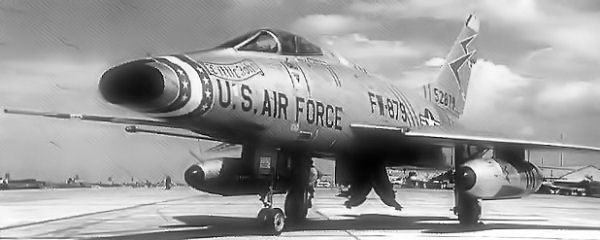
- 39th Air Division F-100 Super Sabre deployed to Korea
- Active: 1952–1968
- Country: United States
- Branch: United States Air Force
- Role: Command of tactical and air defense forces
- Part of: Pacific Air Forces

Insignia
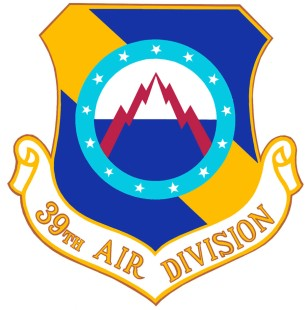
- 39th Air Division emblem (Approved 25 June 1954)

The 39th Air Division (39th AD) is an inactive United States Air Force organization. Its last assignment was with Fifth Air Force at Misawa Air Base, Japan. It was inactivated on 15 January 1968.

== History ==
"Throughout the 1950s and 1960s the 39th Air Division controlled all of the units responsible for the air defense of north Japan, which included northern Honshu and Hokkaido islands and the contiguous territorial waters."

"In this role the 39th trained the assigned units and controlled aerial interception missions when Japanese air space was violated. The division also controlled air refueling and ECM missions, and trained personnel of the Japanese Air Self Defense Force in flying operations, radar operations and maintenance, and proper radio procedures."

"After the Soviet Union shot down an RB-29 aircraft on 7 November 1954, the 39th provided fighter escort for all friendly reconnaissance aircraft flying near Soviet territory and the Northern Air Defense Sector."

"The division also supported combat operations during the Vietnam War."

== Lineage ==
- Designated as the 39th Air Division (Defense) and organized on 1 March 1952

Redesignated as: 39th Air Division on 18 March 1955
Discontinued and inactivated on 15 January 1968

=== Assignments ===
- Japan Air Defense Force, 1 March 1952
- Fifth Air Force, 1 September 1954 – 15 January 1968

=== Stations ===
- Misawa Air Base, Japan, 1 March 1952 – 15 January 1968

=== Components ===
==== Wings ====
- 4th Fighter-Bomber Wing (later 4th Fighter-Day Wing): attached 1 – 7 March 1955, assigned 8 March 1955 – 8 December 1957
- 12th Strategic Fighter Wing: attached 18 May – 10 August 1953 and 10 May – 7 August 1954
- 21st Tactical Fighter Wing: 10 November 1958 – 18 June 1960
- 27th Fighter-Escort Wing (later 27th Strategic Fighter Wing): attached 13 October 1952 – c. 13 February 1953
- 31st Fighter-Escort Wing (later 31 Strategic Fighter Wing): attached 10 July – 11 October 1952 and 10 November 1953 – 12 February 1954
- 49th Fighter-Bomber Wing: attached 7 November 1953 – 1 March 1955, assigned 1 March 1955 – 15 April 1957
- 407th Strategic Fighter Wing: attached 8 August – 10 November 1954
- 506th Strategic Fighter Wing: attached 13 August – 7 November 1953
- 508th Strategic Fighter Wing: attached 18 February – 18 May 1953

==== Squadrons ====
- 4th Fighter-Interceptor Squadron: attached 10 August 1954 – 1 March 1955, assigned 1 March 1955 – 20 June 1965
- 45th Tactical Reconnaissance Squadron: 25 April 1960 – 15 January 1968
- 67th Tactical Fighter Squadron: 15 December 1967 – 15 January 1968
- 339th Fighter-Interceptor Squadron: 1 March 1955 – 15 January 1958
- 356th Tactical Fighter Squadron: 29 November 1965 – 15 January 1968
- 416th Tactical Fighter Squadron: 18 June 1960 – 16 June 1964
- 418th Fighter-Day Squadron: 10 December 1957 – 25 March 1958
- 531st Tactical Fighter Squadron: 18 June 1960 – 16 June 1964
- 612th Tactical Fighter Squadron: 3 November 1965 – 15 January 1968

=== Aircraft ===
- Republic F-84 Thunderjet, 1952 – 1954, 1958 – 1959
- Boeing KB-29 Superfortress, 1953 – 1954
- North American F-86 Sabre, 1954 – 1960
- North American F-100 Super Sabre, 1957 – 1964
- Convair F-102 Delta Dagger, 1960 – 1965
- McDonnell RF-101 Voodoo, 1958 – 1968
- Republic F-105 Thunderchief, 1967 – 1968

== See also ==
- List of United States Air Force air divisions
