= United States Air Force Security Service =

Former signals intelligence service of the US Air Force

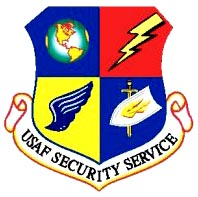
The USAFSS emblem. The globe symbolizes worldwide Influence, the lightning bolt symbolizes communications, the wing symbolizes the Air Force itself, and the sword symbolizes protection and security.

Initially established as the United States Air Force (USAF) Security Group in June, 1948, the USAF Security Service (USAFSS) was activated as a major command on 20 October 1948. (For redesignations, see Successor units.)

The USAFSS was a secretive branch of the Air Force tasked with monitoring, collecting and interpreting military voice and electronic signals of countries of interest (primarily Soviet Union and their satellite Eastern bloc countries). USAFSS intelligence was often analyzed in the field, and the results transmitted to the National Security Agency for further analysis and distribution to other intelligence recipients. USAFSS was tasked to carry out a cryptologic mission and to provide communications security for the newly-established Air Force. The USAFSS motto, adopted 27 July 1963, was "Freedom Through Vigilance". Colonel Roy H. Lynn was the first USAFSS commander.

Some of the many world events in which USAFSS processed and reported special intelligence information include the Korean War, Middle Eastern conflicts, the Cuban Missile Crisis, and the Vietnam War, as well as College Eye and COMBAT APPLE.

== History ==
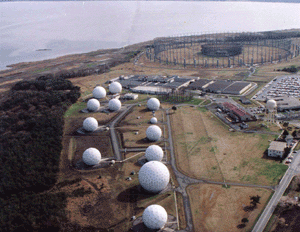
AN/FLR-9 antenna system at Misawa Air Base in Aomori Prefecture, Japan (photo taken in 1990s). The system was demolished in 2014-2015. Radomes in the front of the "elephant cage" still exist.

The USAFSS was tasked with monitoring, collecting and interpreting military voice and electronic signals from countries of interest. The Soviet Union and their satellite Eastern bloc countries were a primary focus. USAFSS intelligence was often analyzed in the field, and the results transmitted to the National Security Agency for further analysis and distribution to other intelligence recipients.

Originally managed from Arlington Hall in Virginia, the USAFSS headquarters was moved temporarily to Brooks Air Force Base, Texas, in 1949. Construction of its headquarters at Kelly Air Force Base, Texas, was completed in 1953.

The USAFSS began with a staff of 34 officers, 6 enlisted personnel, and 116 civilians. It grew to an authorized strength of 17,143 airmen, officers, and civilians by the end of the Korean War, with more than 28,000 personnel at its peak. Members of the USAFSS included morse intercept operators, voice intercept and linguists, non-morse intercept operators, direction finding (DF) equipment operators, and analysts.

In June 1951, the largest U.S. air victory in the Korean War to that date was facilitated by tactical data from a USAFSS detachment, leading to a US air victory when F-86s from Inchon shot down 11 enemy planes. In 1962, the first significant intelligence data on Soviet Union involvement in Cuba was provided by the USAFSS.

The first AN/FLR-9 antenna system, often called "the elephant cage", became operational March 1965, at Misawa AB.

The USAFSS had two major areas of operations: ground-based and airborne. Ground-based units were scattered throughout the globe and collected information from fixed sites with large antenna arrays, such as the AN/FLR-9. Airborne units flew from bases around the world, skirting sensitive areas and collecting data in a variety of aircraft, including C-47s, RB-47s C-130s, EC-121s, and RC-135s.

=== Airborne operations ===
The USAF identified the potential for using airborne platforms to intercept line-of-sight VHF communications during the Korean War. In April 1952, a test mission of the first Airborne Reconnaissance Program (ARP) on a converted B-29 took place. The Airborne Communications Reconnaissance Program (ACRP) was initiated in 1955, engaging in flights collecting Signals Intelligence (SIGINT) along the coasts of China, North Korea, and the Soviet Far East.

On 29 July 1953, a 343d Strategic Reconnaissance Squadron RB-50G-2 was shot down off the USSR coast near Vladivostok, and resulted in the first loss of USAFSS airborne operators in a hostile act.

In 1964, the USAFSS began using the C-47 Airborne Direction Finding platform, providing intelligence to U.S. and friendly commanders throughout Southeast Asia.

From 1964 to 1971, Kadena Air Base was the home-base for long-range surveillance flights over China, North Korea, and North Vietnam by unmanned aerial vehicles (UAVs) or ‘drones’ produced by Ryan Aeronautical Company.

=== Ground operations ===
USAFSS support to national customers expanded in the late 1950s and early 1960s. USAFSS ground units opened in out of the way places around the globe, including Diyarbakir, Karamürsel, Samsun and Trabzon Air Force Detachments in Turkey, Iraklion Air Station, Crete, Wakkanai Air Station in Japan, Darmstadt, Zweibrucken and Wiesbaden Air Bases in Germany, Royal Air Force Kirknewton in Scotland, and Peshawar, Pakistan. In the 1970s, major installations included Misawa AB, Japan, San Vito Air Station, Italy and RAF Chicksands, England.

Locations like Elmendorf AFB and Clark AB were equipped with direction finding shops from which "fixes" on targets could be obtained by requesting a line of bearing from other direction finding shops in other locations around the world. This would give a triangulation fix on a target and that target could then be plotted on a board and the coordinates then forwarded to take proper action on the targets. All this was accomplished by using the AN/FLR-9 antenna. The antenna array covered 35 acres (140,000 m^{2}) of ground and was composed of A, B and C band elements that covered the high frequency (HF) range of signals that targets of interest transmitted on.

=== Mobile operations ===
In the late 1950s, the USAFSS developed a new mobile operations concept. The first mobile unit deployment in 1956 was in response to an unstable Middle East. In the 1960s, more ERUs were added to facilitate quick response of intelligence collection capabilities in a crisis.

In Japan, a mobile contingency team, maintained by the 6918th Security Squadron, deployed to conduct site surveys and establish intercept sites. Some of the deployments required civilian clothing to mask the nature of their activities.

In July, 1974, a 114-man ERU was sent to San Vito Air Station, when hostilities broke out between Cyprus and Crete.

=== TRANSEC/COMSEC operations ===
From its inception, USAFSS also maintained a cadre of TRANSEC (Transmission Security), later known as COMSEC (Communications Security) personnel. Their mission consisted of monitoring and analyzing US military radio, teletype, and telephone communications to identify practices and individual communications that could compromise or endanger sensitive or classified operations. The missions initially employed 292X1 Morse operators and 202X0 analysts for analysis and reporting.

TRANSEC/COMSEC teams operated in both tactical and strategic environments, utilizing both fixed locations and deployed (TDY) teams. In 1970, deployed missions became a major portion of the mission, with teams utilizing S-141 shelters specially configured for each mission. They also used a variety of "manpack" positions configured for radio and telephone surveillance and shipped or handcarried into the field. The S-141 shelters were later replaced by a command-designed truck-based system, the AN-MSR-1. Due to design shortcomings and a low ceiling, the system was better known to operators as the "MISERY".

TRANSEC/COMSEC units and teams provided a variety of message reports, parallel to SIGINT reporting, directly to their tasking authorities (not the NSA) and to tactical/field commanders who could take actions based on the reports. Units also provided hardcopy summary reports to their tasking authorities. Many USAFSS personnel were dedicated to this mission throughout their Air Force careers, while others moved between TRANSEC/COMSEC and the more traditional SIGINT operations. The TRANSEC/COMSEC mission was occasionally used as a cover story for SIGINT operations. Likewise, deployed TRANSEC/COMSEC teams occasionally used USAFSS SIGINT units as cover for Trusted Agent/covert missions.

== Successor units ==
- USAFSS was redesignated as the Electronic Security Command on 1 August 1979.
- Electronic Security Command was redesignated as the Air Force Intelligence Command on 1 October 1991.
- Air Force Intelligence Command was redesignated as Air Intelligence Agency on 1 October 1993 (and changed from major command to field operating agency (FOA) subordinate to HQ, USAF/Intelligence Directorate (HAF/IN).
- Air Intelligence Agency was redesignated as a Primary Subordinate Unit (PSU) subordinate to Air Combat Command) on 1 February 2001.
- Air Intelligence Agency was redesignated as the Air Force Intelligence, Surveillance, and Reconnaissance Agency on 8 June 2007 (and became a FOA again, subordinate to HQ, USAF/Intelligence Directorate (HAF/XOI)).
- Air Force Intelligence, Surveillance, and Reconnaissance Agency was redesignated as the Twenty-Fifth Air Force on 29 September 2014 (and subordinate of Air Combat Command)
- Twenty-Fifth Air Force merged with the 24th Air Force to form a reactivated 16th Air Force on 11 October 2019 (and subordinate of Air Combat Command).
