= Gulf Breeze Six =

1990 desertion incident with eschatological undertones

The Gulf Breeze Six incident refers to the desertion of six military intelligence analysts from the American 701st Military Intelligence Brigade who got arrested in Gulf Breeze, Florida, presumably traveling there while spurred by their spiritual beliefs.

== Absent without leave ==
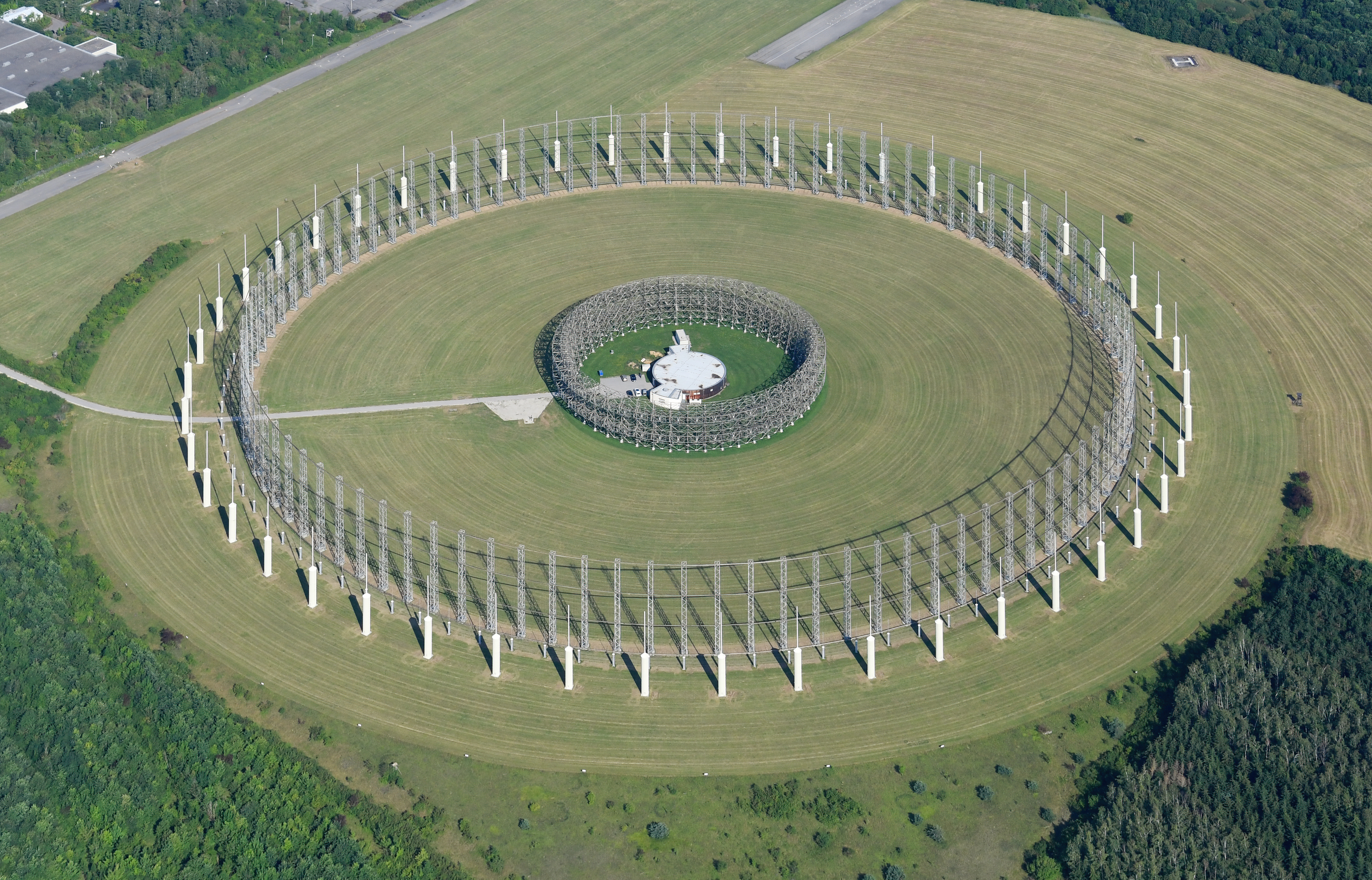
A 2024 picture of USASA Field Station Augsburg the six military analysts deserted from in 1990.

Michael Hueckstaedt, Kris Perlock, William Setterberg, Vance Davis, Kenneth G. Beason, and Annette Eccleston were declared absent without leave from their base at Augsburg on July 9, 1990, in what was then West Germany. They were arrested five days later in Florida. All six were military intelligence analysts who had trained together at Corry Station.

Beliefs attributed to Christian eschatology appear to have played a role in their decision to journey to Florida. According to Stars and Stripes, Beason told family members and other people that they came to Florida to survive the end of the world and out of interest for UFO phenomena. Members of their units reported that some members of the group initially intended to kill the antichrist, although Beason would later deny having said anything of the sort. A conference of the Mutual UFO Network (MUFON) was taking place in Pensacola on July 9, although it is not clear any member of the group attended. Just two years prior, the Gulf Breeze UFO sightings, largely believed to be a hoax, had attracted the attention of those interested in the paranormal.

Speaking two years after the events, Davis denied the group had any interest in UFOs. According to his version of events, they had been experimenting with a ouija board since 1989 and had been spiritually instructed to leave the military in preparation for the Rapture.

== Arrests and release ==
On July 14, the six were arrested, most of them at the Gulf Breeze home of one Anna Foster, after Hueckstaedt attracted police attention for a traffic violation. Foster was described by police as a psychic.

Under investigation for espionage, they were detained at the Fort Benning army post, then sent to Fort Knox. Because of their access to highly classified material, they were charged with desertion rather than being merely reported as absent without leave. The charges were dropped however and all six were discharged from the military within a few weeks. Three of the six came back to live at Foster's home for a time after their release. Davis would marry another woman living in Foster's home and move to Albuquerque. He wrote a book about his experiences in 1995.
