= Misawa Air Base =

Japanese-American joint air base in Aomori, Japan

- 三沢飛行場; Misawa Hikōjō
- Misawa, Aomori Prefecture in Japan
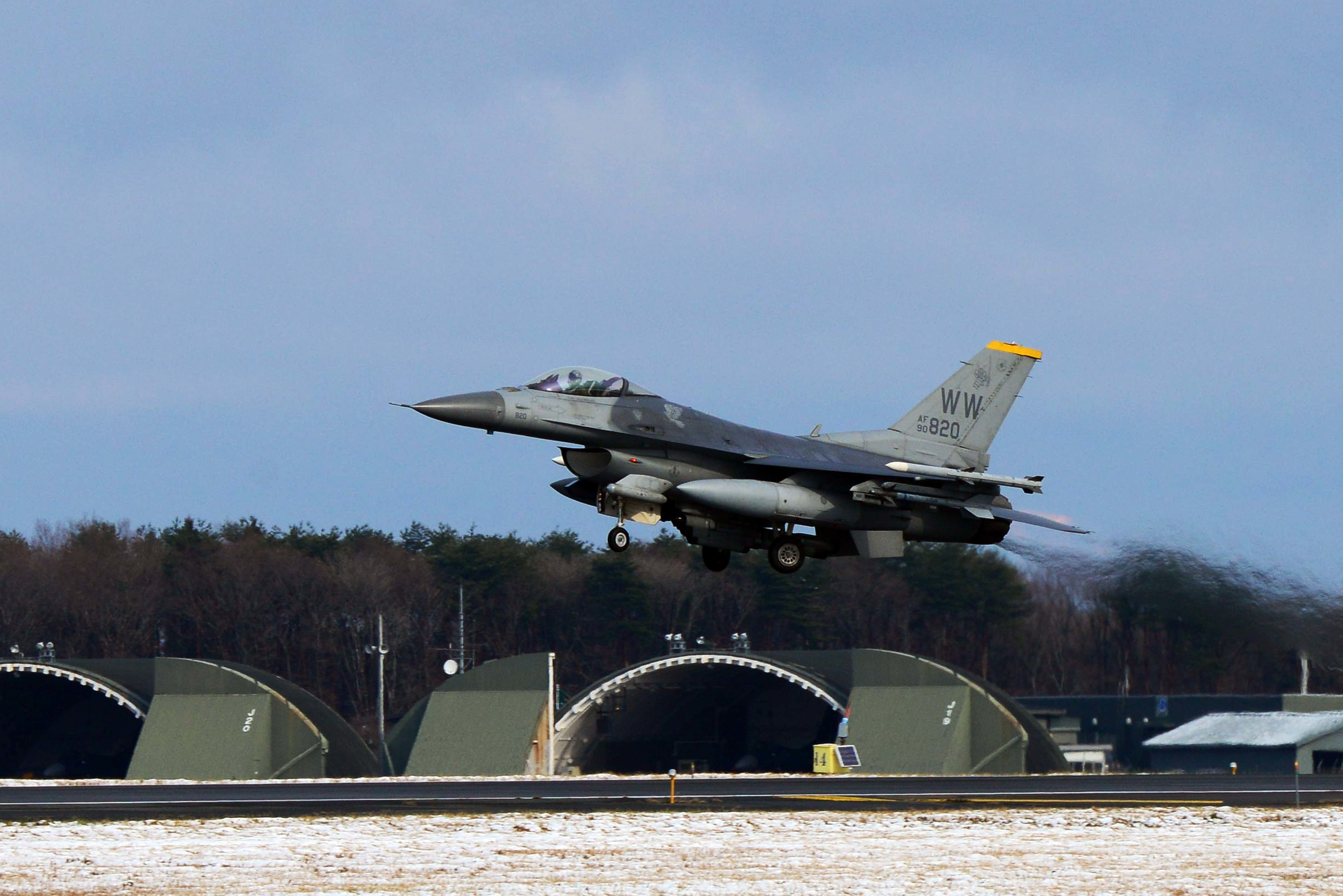
- A US Air Force F-16 Fighting Falcon assigned to the 35th Fighter Wing departs Misawa Air Base during 2014.

Site information
- Type: Joint Japanese and United States air base
- Owner: Various (leased by Government of Japan and made available to the US)
- Operator: Japan Air Self-Defense Force (JASDF); US Air Force (USAF); US Navy (USN); US Army (USA)
- Controlled by: Air Defense Command (Japan) (JASDF); Pacific Air Forces (USAF)
- Condition: Operational
- Website: www.misawa.af.mil

Location
- Location in Japan Misawa AB (Japan)
- Coordinates: 40°42′19″N 141°22′19″E

Site history
- Built: 1938
- In use: 1938 – present
- Events: Misawa Air Festival (三沢航空祭)

Garrison information
- Garrison: Northern Air Defense Force (JASDF); 35th Fighter Wing (USAF)

Airfield information
- Identifiers: IATA: MSJ, ICAO: RJSM, WMO: 475800
- Elevation: 390.4 metres (1,281 ft) AMSL
Runways
Direction	Length and surface
10/28^{A}	3,050 metres (10,007 ft) Asphalt/Concrete
- Source: Japanese AIP at AIS Japan :A.The text version gives a runway length of 3,050 by 45 m (10,007 by 148 ft) and the aerodrome chart a length of 10,000 by 150 ft (3,048 by 46 m)

Misawa Air Base (三沢飛行場, Misawa Hikōjō) (IATA: MSJ, ICAO: RJSM) is an air base of the Japan Air Self-Defense Force (JASDF), the United States Air Force, and the United States Navy located in Misawa, Aomori, in the northern part of the island of Honshū of Japan. It is located 684 km (425 mi) north of Tokyo at the "Tip of the Spear". It is a Pacific Air Forces (PACAF) facility with the 35th Fighter Wing (35 FW, about 48 F-16 aircraft split among the 13th and 14th Fighter Squadrons) as its host wing. It hosts both Japanese and American troops.

== History ==
=== Origins ===
What is now called Misawa Air Base has been used by the military since the Meiji period, when it was used as a cavalry training center for the Imperial Army.

In 1870, the Emperor Meiji established a stud farm for the household cavalry in the area that later became Misawa AB, and kept his own (Tenno Heika) cavalry there until 1931, when the Sino-Japanese conflict required their use in China. Misawa remained a training center for Japanese Cavalry until the Japanese Army constructed the first runway at Misawa for military aircraft in 1938.

Misawa Air Base was near the takeoff site of the world's first non-stop trans-Pacific flight in 1931. Clyde Pangborn and Hugh Herndon took off from a gravel runway on Sabishiro Beach near Misawa in the aircraft known as Miss Veedol, landing 41 hours later in Wenatchee, Washington, thereby successfully crossing the Pacific Ocean. The runway is commemorated by a large sign in the coastal forest and is a popular beach and recreation area for Misawa AB personnel. The cities of Wenatchee and Misawa cemented their special relationship by becoming official sister cities in 1981, strengthening their friendship through annual cultural exchange programs.

The Imperial Army transformed Misawa into an air base in 1938 when it was used as a base for long-range bombers. By early 1941, the Genzan Flying Corps trained at Misawa. The base was taken over by the Imperial Navy Air Corps in 1942, when the 22d Imperial Naval Air Wg assumed control of the base and the mission was changed to research and development. In 1944, facilities were built for Kamikaze Special Attack forces.

=== World War II ===
Before the outbreak of World War II, Lake Ogawara at Misawa was used by the Imperial Japanese Navy Air Service to practice for the attack on Pearl Harbor. The lake was used because it was similar in depth to Pearl Harbor. The Japanese military fashioned hills near the shore of the lake to resemble the shapes of Battleships and Cruisers that were anchored in Pearl Harbor. This provided for a realistic view for their pilots from the air. The pilots conducted low level bombing runs, dropping torpedoes into the shallow depths of Lake Ogawara. This practice developed and refined the method to attack the ships that were anchored at Pearl Harbor. During World War II, the Misawa area was heavily damaged (base 90 percent destroyed) by U.S. fighters and bombers.

=== Postwar era ===
The American occupation of Misawa began in September 1945. Misawa had to be almost completely reconstructed by occupying U.S. forces, the Army's 32nd Engineer Construction Group, who restored the base for future use by the United States Army Air Forces. During the Korean War and Vietnam War, Misawa supported fighter missions. The base was the launching point for clandestine surveillance overflights into China and the USSR during the 1950s.

After the immediate postwar reconstruction of facilities, the first permanent USAAF tenant was the 613th Air Control and Warning Squadron (613th AC&WS), taking up residence on July 15, 1946, and providing air traffic control in the Misawa area for the next decade.

==== 49th Fighter Bomber Wing ====
The first operational fighter wing was the 49th Fighter-Bomber Group, being reassigned to Misawa on March 31, 1948. The 49th had three operational squadrons, the 7th, 8th and 9th, and flew the P-80 Shooting Star along with a few P-61 Black Widow night fighters. The 49th FBW performed occupation duties in Japan and took part in maneuvers and surveillance patrols as part of Far East Air Forces. In February 1950, the unit was redesignated as the 49th Fighter-Bomber Wing, with the group being its operational component.

=== Korean War ===
With the outbreak of the Korean War in June 1950, the 49th Fighter-Bomber Group was split off from the wing and was one of the first USAF units dispatched to South Korea from Japan, its tactical squadrons began operations with F-51D Mustangs as the F-51D performed the ground support role better than the Shooting Stars. The group was rejoined with the wing in December 1950 when the Wing was reassigned to Taegu Air Base (K-2).

At Misawa, the 49th was replaced by the 6163d Air Base Wing to perform host and occupation duties. The 41st Fighter-Interceptor Squadron from the 35th FIW at Johnson AB was deployed to Misawa to provide air defense starting in September 1950, remaining until February 1951, being replaced by the 40th FIS also from Johnson AB, which remained until July. The 27th Fighter-Escort Wing was transferred from Taegu to Misawa in October, and remained at the base until January 20, 1953, to provide air defense flying straight-winged Republic F-84G Thunderjets which proved inadequate against the North Korean MiG-15s it encountered over Korean airspace.

Between May and August 1953, the 12th Strategic Fighter Wing pulled a rotational TDY at Misawa relieving the 27th and being relieved in turn by the 31st Strategic Fighter Wing remaining until February 12, 1954. The 12th SFW returned for a second TDY in May 1954, remaining until August.

The 49th Fighter-Bomber Wing was relieved from its duties in South Korea on November 7, 1953, and resumed its host duties at the base. It remained at Misawa until December 10, 1957, however its operational control of its squadrons and group came under the 39th Air Division on March 1, 1955.

=== Cold War ===
==== 39th Air Division ====
On March 1, 1952, the 39th Air Division was established at Misawa, and through January 15, 1968, the Air Division controlled all of the units responsible for the air defense of north Japan, which included northern Honshū and Hokkaidō islands and the contiguous territorial waters.

Wings controlled by the 39th AD were:

- 49th Fighter Bomber Wing March 1, 1955 – April 15, 1957
- 4th Fighter Bomber Wing March 8, 1955 – December 8, 1957
- 21st Tactical Fighter Wing November 10, 1958 – June 18, 1960

Squadrons controlled by the 39th AD were:

- 4th Fighter Interceptor Squadron March 1, 1955 – June 20, 1965
- 45th Tactical Reconnaissance Squadron April 25, 1960 – January 15, 1968
- 67th Tactical Fighter Squadron December 15, 1967 – January 15, 1968
- 339th Fighter Interceptor Squadron March 1, 1955 – January 15, 1958
- 356th Tactical Fighter Squadron November 29, 1965 – January 15, 1968
- 416th Tactical Fighter Squadron June 18, 1960 – June 16, 1964
- 418th Fighter Day Squadron December 10, 1957 – March 25, 1958
- 531st Tactical Fighter Squadron June 18, 1960 – June 16, 1964
- 612th Tactical Fighter Squadron November 3, 1965 – January 15, 1968.

In this role the 39th trained the assigned units and controlled aerial interception missions when Japanese air space was violated. The division also controlled air refueling and ECM missions, and trained personnel of the Japanese Air Self Defense Force in flying operations, radar operations and maintenance, and proper radio procedures.

After the Soviet Union shot down an RB-29 aircraft on November 7, 1954, the 39th provided fighter escort for all US reconnaissance aircraft flying near Soviet territory and the Northern Air Defense Sector.

The division also supported combat operations during the Vietnam War.

Aircraft flown by the 39th AD included the F-84, 1952–1954, 1958–1959; KB-29, 1953–1954; North American F-86 Sabre, 1954–1960; F-100, 1957–1964; F-102, 1960–1965; RF-101, 1960–1968; F-105, 1967–1968.

==== Japanese Air Forces ====
The first Japanese Air Self-Defense Force (JASDF) units were activated at Misawa in October 1954, and the first Japanese Northern Air Defense Force units began operations in 1957.

==== 475th Air Base Wing ====
The 31st Air Division was inactivated on January 15, 1968, and was replaced at Misawa by the 475th Air Base Wing. The operational squadron at the base was the 67th Tactical Fighter Squadron, being deployed to Misawa from the 18th Tactical Fighter Wing based at Kadena AB, Okinawa. The squadron remained detached at Misawa until March 15, 1971, when the flight line was transferred to the United States Navy and all U.S. Air Force fighter sorties ended.

==== 6112th Air Base Group ====
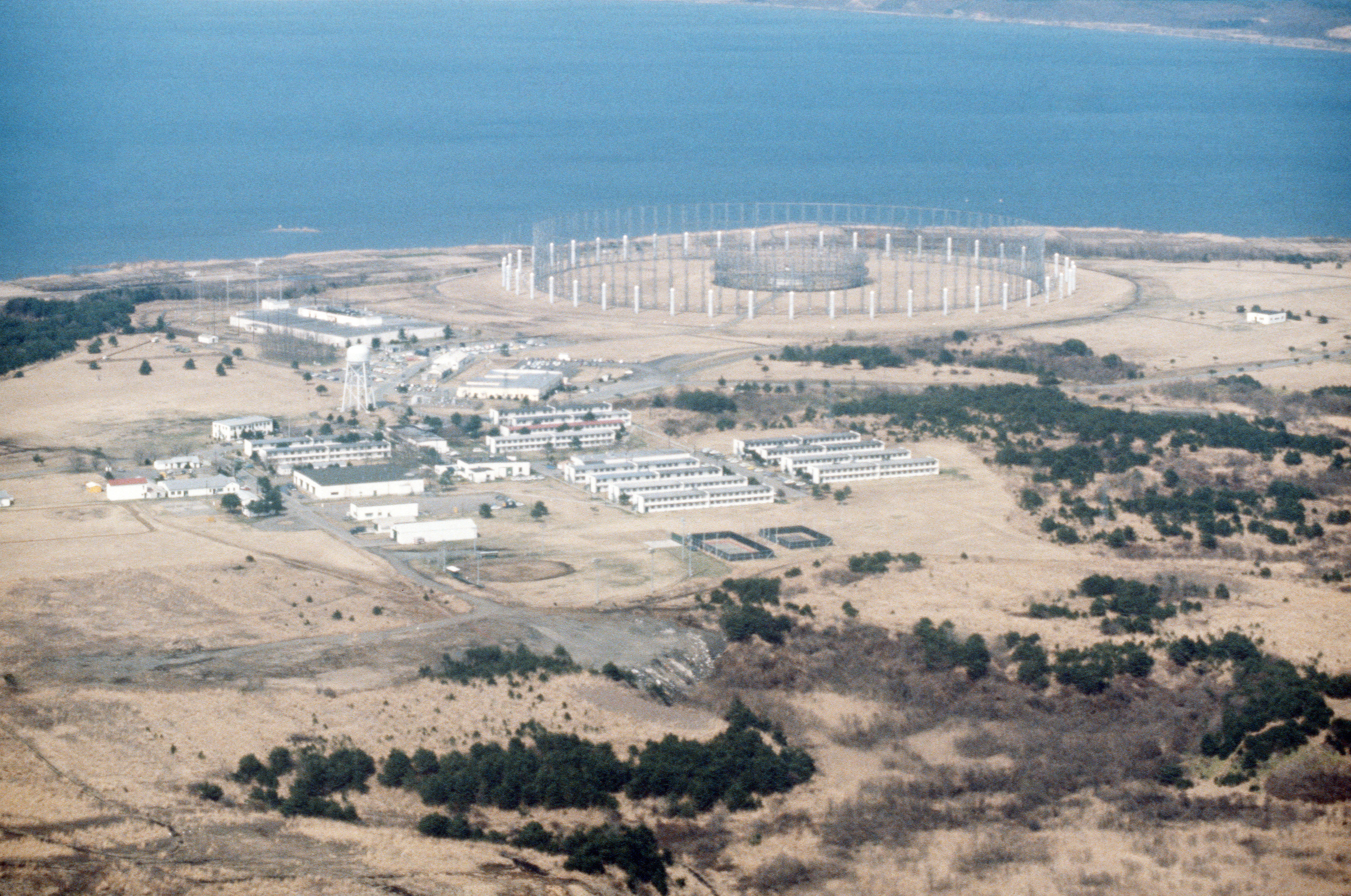
AN/FLR-9 antenna array Misawa Air Base c.1980

The 6112th ABG took over the base host duties at Misawa in 1971, with the inactivation of the 475th ABW. For the next several years, Misawa's focus was with the electronic intelligence gathering mission of the 6921st (later 6920th) Security Wing of the U.S. Air Force Security Service. The 6112th ABG performed PACAF administrative duties. The flight line was controlled by Naval Aviation units, with the JASDF operating from its own flight lines. The JASDF took over control of the airspace over Misawa on October 1, 1978.

During this period, the base hosted various Allied exercises in the region and the 6112th ABG provided support for 13 Air Force associated non-flying units, 14 DOD agencies and the JASDF units stationed in the Misawa area until September 1, 1982.

In 1983, Misawa was a major deployment site for rescue and recovery operations, following the downing of Korean Air Flight 007.

==== 432d Tactical Fighter Wing ====
In July 1985, the 432d Tactical Fighter Wing was reactivated at Misawa on the resumption of operational PACAF flying. The 432d controlled two F-16 Fighting Falcon squadrons (13th, 14th FS) and a rescue squadron (39th RQS) flying the HH-53 "Super Jolly Green Giant" helicopter.

=== Post Cold War ===
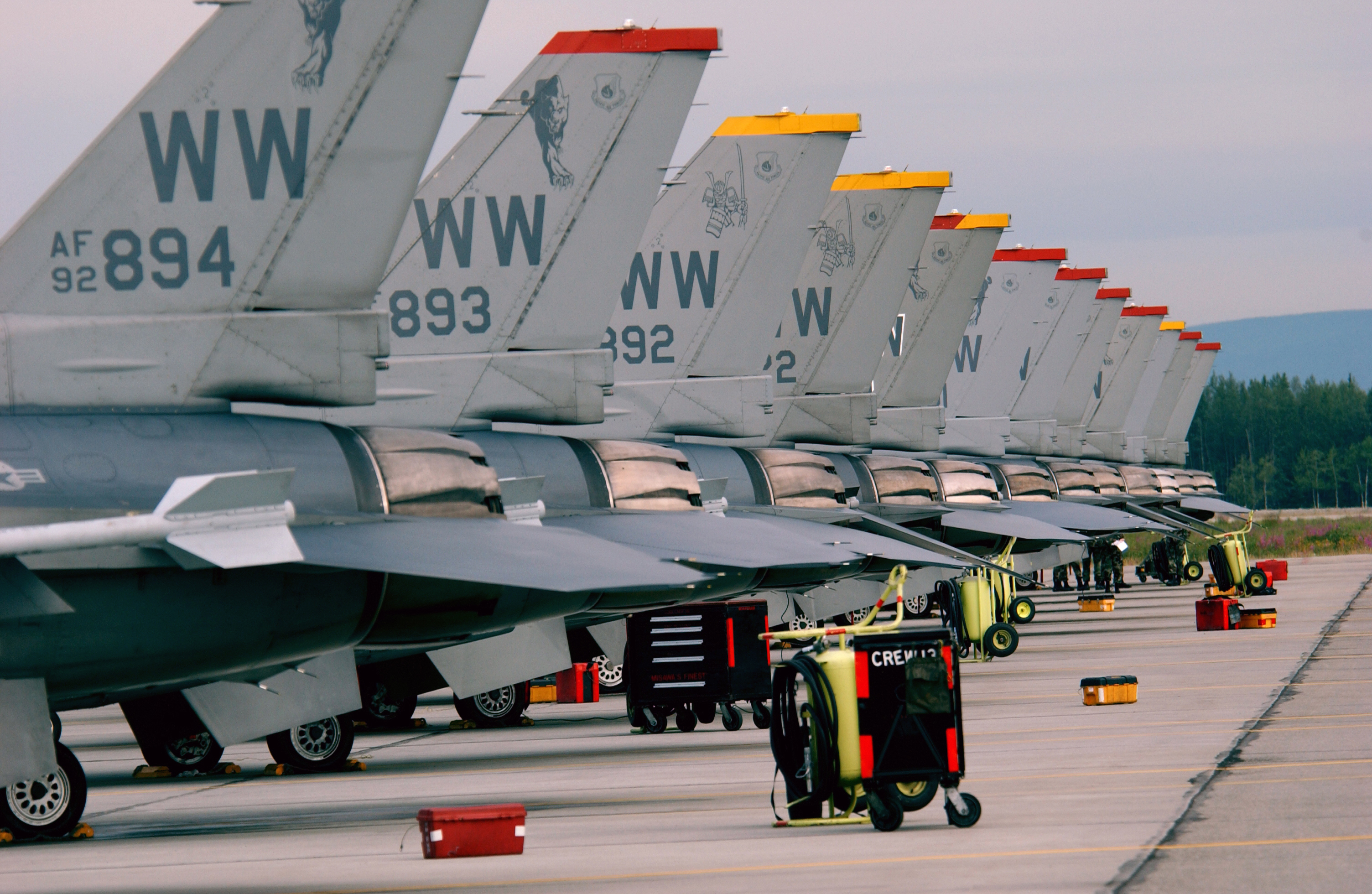
Misawa F-16s

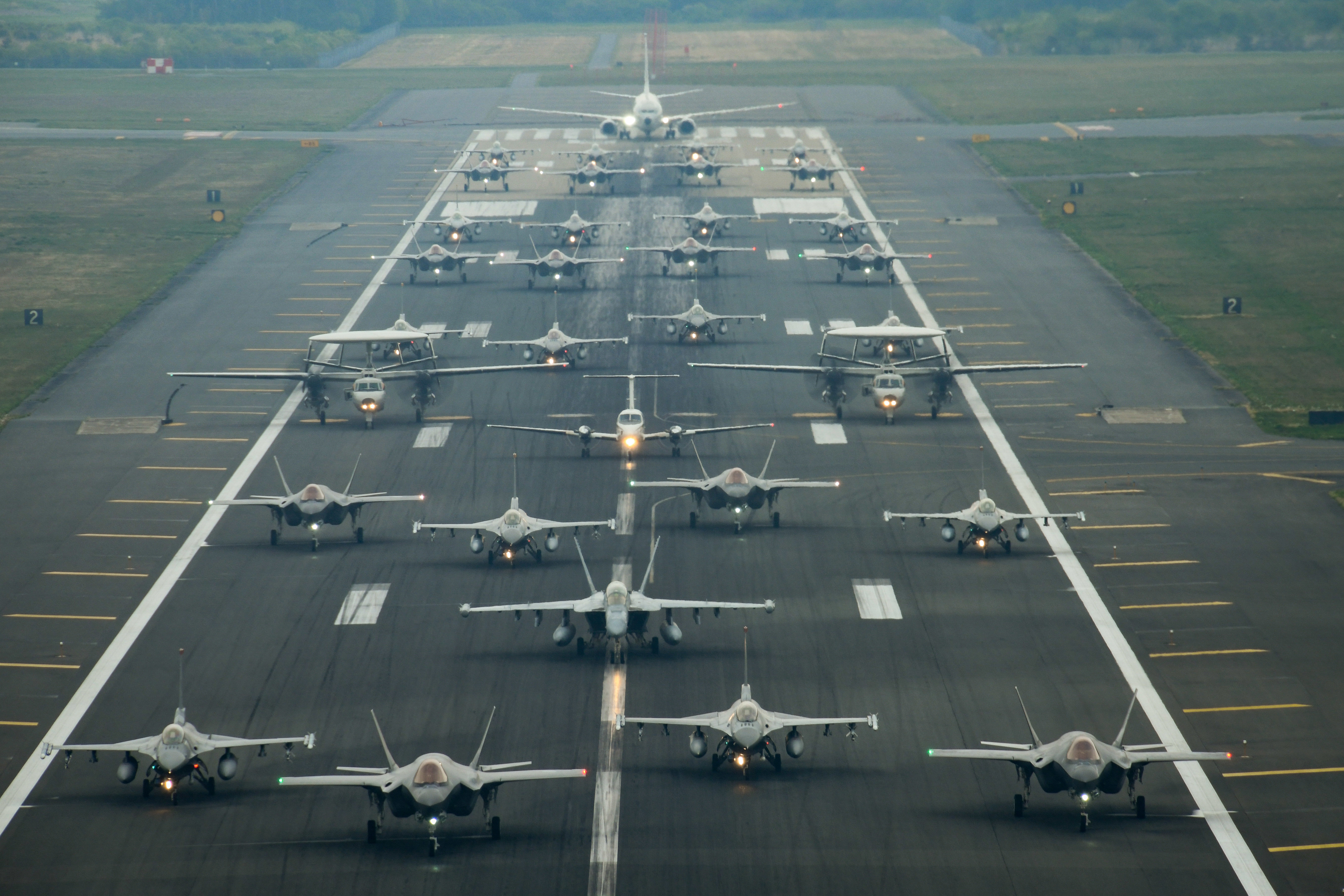
"Elephant Walk" at Misawa Air Base, May 2022

The 35th Fighter Wing was redesignated and reassigned October 1, 1994, when it inactivated at Naval Air Station Keflavik, Iceland and was reactivated the same day at Misawa where the wing assumed the missions and responsibilities previously performed by the 432nd Fighter Wing.

Near the 1995 new year, Misawa experienced two earthquakes—7.5 and 7.9 on the Richter scale at the epicenter off the coast of Hachinohe.

On July 25, 1998, a US F-16 based at Misawa was unable to become airborne and collided with an antenna array at the east end of Misawa's runway and exploded. The pilot ejected, but landed in the flaming wreckage of the jet. He succumbed to his injuries on September 17, 1998, at Brooke Army Medical Center.

=== Twenty-first century ===
On September 25, 2003, a magnitude 8.3 earthquake occurred off the east coast of Hokkaidō which was strongly felt in Misawa and all of Aomori Prefecture. Damage to Misawa Air Base was limited to burst water mains, cosmetic cracks in walls and personal property damage. There were no reports of damage to the base runway. This was the largest earthquake reported by the U.S. Geological Survey (USGS) for 2003.

On July 17, 2007, a US F-16 from Misawa, while deployed to the 13th Expeditionary Fighter Squadron, Balad AB, Iraq crashed after delinquent tire pressure testing and pilot misinterpretation. The pilot ejected safely and there were no injuries or deaths.

The base was slightly damaged by the March 2011 Tōhoku earthquake and tsunami and experienced a black out. There were concerns about flooding from the tsunami reaching the base, and about a nearby nuclear facility, the Rokkasho Reprocessing Plant.

After the quake, personnel and aircraft from the base assisted with Operation Tomodachi. The base also served as an important hub for airlifted assistance during the disaster recovery efforts. During the crisis, around 1,400 American family members voluntarily departed the base for locations outside Japan.

In April 2015, two US F-16s based at Misawa made an emergency landing at a local airport after oil started leaking from one of the fighters.

In October 2016, four Royal Air Force Typhoon fighters from No. 2 Squadron RAF supported by a Voyager aerial tanker and a C-17 deployed to Misawa for the first bilateral exercises in Japan for the JASDF to host conducted with non-U.S. forces.

On February 20, 2018, a US F-16 based at Misawa dumped two external fuel tanks into the nearby Lake Ogawara after experiencing an engine fire.

On January 14, 2019, a US F-16 based at Misawa made a precautionary landing at a Japanese regional airport after a problem with the aircraft. It was later revealed that this was due to a plastic piece falling off of the aircraft mid-flight.

On April 3, 2019, a Japanese F-35A based at Misawa crashed over the Pacific Ocean approximately 85 miles (137 km) east of Misawa Air Base. The cause was attributed to the pilot experiencing spatial disorientation. The JASDF proceeded to ground their F-35 fleet until safety inspections and additional training for pilots on spatial disorientation could be completed. Some debris from the aircraft was recovered, however, the pilot's remains were not recovered until June 2019.

On November 1, 2019, a US F-16 based at Misawa accidentally dropped an inert training device about 3 miles north of Misawa Air Base's Draughon Range, into a privately owned field. There were no injuries or deaths.

On February 2, 2020, the 35th Fighter Wing Commander temporarily tightened the base's curfew and prohibited the consumption of alcohol off-post until March 2, 2020. This was due to 5 DUI cases and eight other alcohol related incidents over the course of December 2019 and January 2020.

In May 2021, the US Navy forward deployed Unmanned Patrol Squadron 19, operating two MQ-4C Tritons, from Andersen AFB to Naval Air Facility Misawa under CTF-72. The aircraft returned to Andersen AFB in Oct 2021.

=== Events in the 2020s ===
On December 1, 2021, a US F-16 based at Misawa dropped its external fuel tank in the town of Fukaura, Aomori, during an in-flight emergency. The fuel tank fell near homes and the town hall of Fukaura. There were no injuries or deaths following the incident, and the F-16 made an emergency landing at Aomori Airport. The Japanese Ministry of Defense requested the base ground all F-16s, until it could be determined they were fit to fly.

In March 2022, the Japan Air Self Defense Force acquired the first of three RQ-4B Global Hawks which were stationed at Misawa as part of the 3rd Air Wing. All three are scheduled to be delivered by the end of 2022.

In September 2022, the 35th Aircraft Maintenance Squadron was inactivated and split into the 13th and 14th Fighter Generation Squadrons under the 35th Maintenance Group.

On September 15, 2026, an RQ-4 Global Hawk assigned to the 502nd Squadron, Air Warning Wing based at Misawa AB crashed into the Sea of Japan, approximately 50 km north of Tottori Prefecture. The drone aircraft is one of the Air SDF's three Global Hawks, costs about 17 billion yen ($109 million).

=== Major commands to which assigned ===
- Far East Air Forces, (September–December 1945)

Redesignated: Pacific Air Command, United States Army, (December 1945 – January 1947)
Redesignated: Far East Air Forces, (January 1947 – July 1957)
Redesignated: Pacific Air Forces, (July 1957 – July 1972)

Air Defense Command (Attached), (September 1950 – June 1965)

- United States Air Force Security Service, (July 1972 – October 1978)
- Pacific Air Forces, (October 1978–present)

=== Major Operating Units ===
- US Army 32d Engineer Construction Group*, September 1945 – August 1948
- 49th Fighter-Bomber Group, March 31, 1948 – January 23, 1950

49th Fighter (later Fighter-Bomber) Wing*, August 18, 1948 – December 1, 1950

- 41st Fighter-Interceptor Squadron (Air Defense), September 6, 1950 – February 20, 1951

Detachment from Johnson Air Base, Japan

- 6163d Air Base Wing*, December 1, 1950 – November 2, 1951
- 40th Fighter-Interceptor Squadron (Air Defense), May 25 – July 1, 1951
- 116th Fighter-Bomber Wing*, November 1, 1951 – July 1, 1952

Federalized Georgia Air National Guard

- 6016th Air Base Wing, January 1, 1952 – November 18, 1953
- 39th Air Division, March 1, 1952 – January 15, 1968
- 474th Fighter-Bomber Wing, July 10, 1952 – April 1, 1953
- 27th Fighter-Escort Wing, October 9, 1952 – January 20, 1953
- 31st Fighter-Escort (later Strategic Fighter) Wing, July 20 – October 11, 1952; November 11, 1953 – February 12, 1954
- 12th Strategic Fighter Wing, May 15, 1953 – August 10, 1953
- 49th Air Base Group*, April 1, 1953 – December 10, 1957

49th Fighter-Bomber Wing*, November 7, 1953 – December 10, 1957
49th Fighter-Bomber Group, June 1 – December 10, 1957

- 506th Fighter-Escort Wing, August 15 – November 15, 1953
- 12th Strategic Fighter Wing, May 12 – August 11, 1954
- 16th Fighter-Interceptor Squadron (Air Defense), July 1 – August 1, 1954
- 4th Fighter-Interceptor Squadron (Air Defense), August 1, 1954 – June 20, 1965
- 336th Fighter-Interceptor (later Fighter-Bomber, Fighter-Day) Squadron, November 19, 1954 – August 7, 1956
- 45th Tactical Reconnaissance Squadron, March 3, 1955 – November 15, 1963
- 6921st Radio Squadron

Redesignated: 6921st Radio Group
Redesignated: 6921st Security Wing, May 8, 1955 – February 1, 1976

- JASDF Northern Air Defense Force, July 15, 1957 – present
- 6139th Air Base Group*, October 10, 1957 – January 8, 1964

416th Fighter-Bomber (later Tactical Fighter) Squadron, March 25, 1958 – June 15, 1964
531st Tactical Fighter Squadron, July 1, 1958 – June 15, 1964

Redesignated: 439th Air Base Group*, January 8, 1964 – January 15, 1968
Redesignated: 475th Tactical Fighter Wing*, January 15, 1968 – March 15, 1971

612th Tactical Fighter Squadron, November 3, 1965 – May 15, 1971
356th Tactical Fighter Squadron, November 29, 1965 – May 15, 1971
67th Tactical Fighter Squadron, December 15, 1967 – March 15, 1971
391st Tactical Fighter Squadron, July 22, 1968 – February 28, 1971
16th Tactical Reconnaissance Squadron, March 16, 1970 – February 15, 1971

- 3d Tactical Fighter Wing, March 15, 1971 – September 16, 1974
- 6122d Air Base Group*, March 15, 1971 – July 1, 1972
- U.S. Naval Security Group Activity, July 1, 1971 – December 29, 2005

Redesignated: U.S. Navy Information Operations Command Misawa, December 29, 2005 – October 14, 2014

- 6920th Air Base Group*, July 1, 1972 – February 1, 1976

Redesignated: 6920th Security Wing*, February 1, 1976 – October 1, 1978

- 6112th Air Base Group*, October 1, 1978 – July 1, 1984
- 432d Tactical Fighter Wing*, July 1, 1984 – October 31, 1994
- 35th Fighter Wing* October 31, 1994 – present

* Performed Host Unit functions

== Role and operations ==
Misawa is the only combined, joint service installation in the western Pacific. It houses three U.S. military services (Air Force, Navy, and Army), as well as the Japan Air Self-Defense Force. The base is home to 5,200 US military personnel, as well as 350 US civilian employees and 900 Japanese national employees.

The Misawa Passive Radio Frequency space surveillance site was used for tracking satellites using the signals they transmit. It also provided coverage of geosynchronous satellites using the Deep Space Tracking System (DSTS) but was dismantled around 2002. The Misawa Security Operations Center (MSOC), located in the northwestern part of the Air Base, is believed to be one of the largest ECHELON ground stations.

=== United States ===
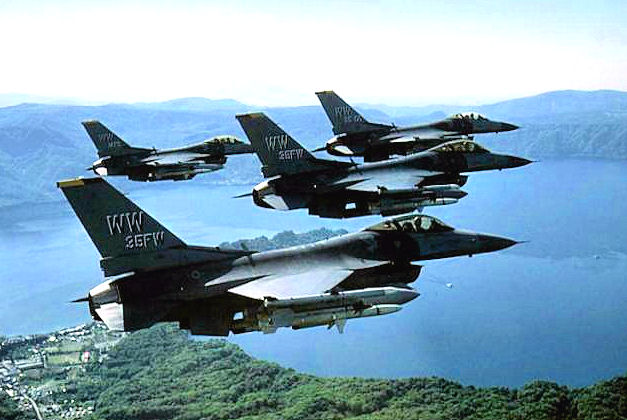
Misawa F-16CJ Block 50 Flagships

The United States Air Force's 35th Fighter Wing (35 FW) is the host unit at Misawa Air Base. The wing conducts daily F-16 flight training to maintain its combat readiness. Its pilots fly air-to-air weapons delivery exercises over water and sharpen their air-to-ground skills using the Draughon Gunnery Range (formerly Ripsaw Range) located 12 miles north of Misawa.

Four groups are assigned to the 35th Fighter Wing: the 35th Maintenance Group, the 35th Mission Support Group, 35th Medical Group and 35th Operations Group. Operational fighter squadrons of the 35th Operations Group are:

- 13th Fighter Squadron "Panthers", Red tail stripe
- 14th Fighter Squadron "Samurais", Yellow tail stripe

Both squadrons fly the Block 50 F-16C/D "Wild Weasels", and use the tail code of "WW" (before adopting the "WW" tail code, the code "MJ" (for Misawa, Japan) was carried.

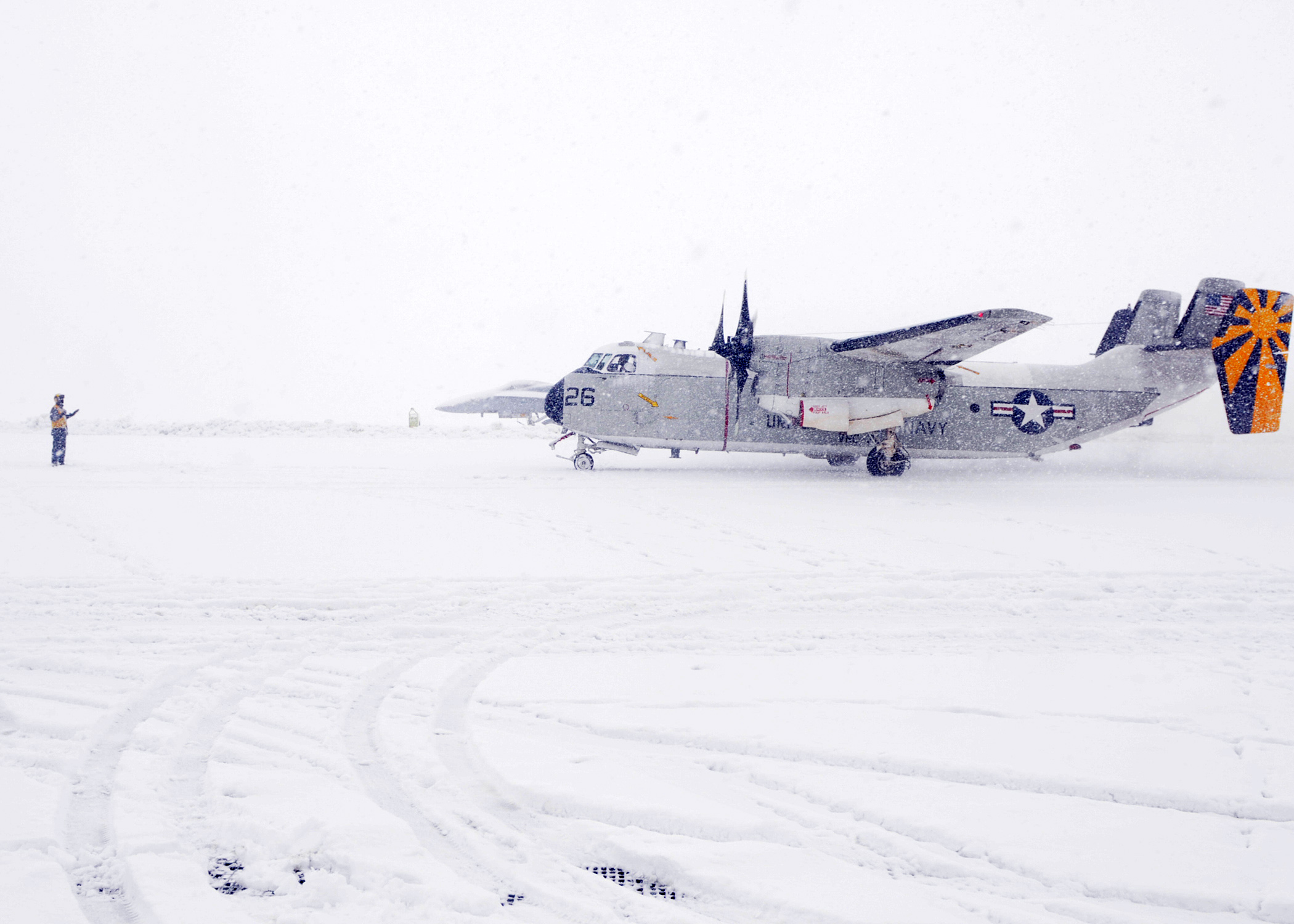
A US Navy C-2 at Misawa

U.S. Navy

- Naval Air Facility Misawa
- Commander, Patrol and Reconnaissance Force Seventh Fleet (COMPATRECONFORSEVENTHFLT, Task Force 72). In 2018 this force is an additional designation for Commander, Patrol and Reconnaissance Wing 1.
- Aircraft Intermediate Maintenance Department (AIMD) Misawa
- Navy Munitions Command East Asia Division (NMC EAD) Unit Misawa
- Rotational squadrons and detachments of P-8A Poseidon and EA-18G Growler aircraft on six-month deployments to NAF Misawa

U.S. Defense Contractor

- CUBIC Defense Applications ACMI

== Based units ==
Flying and notable non-flying units based at Misawa Air Base.

=== United States Air Force ===
Pacific Air Forces (PACAF)

- Fifth Air Force
  - 35th Fighter Wing (Host Wing)
    - 35th Comptroller Squadron
    - 35th Fighter Wing Staff Agencies
    - 35th Operations Group
      - 13th Fighter Squadron – F-16CJ/DJ Fighting Falcon
      - 14th Fighter Squadron – F-16CJ/DJ Fighting Falcon
      - 35th Operations Support Squadron
      - 610th Air Control Flight
    - 35th Maintenance Group
      - 13th Fighter Generation Squadron
      - 14th Fighter Generation Squadron
      - 35th Maintenance Squadron
    - 35th Medical Group
      - 35th Operational Medical Readiness Squadron
      - 35th Dental Squadron
      - 35th Healthcare Operations Squadron
      - 35th Medical Support Squadron
      - 35th Surgical Operations Squadron
    - 35th Mission Support Group
      - 35th Civil Engineer Squadron
      - 35th Contracting Squadron
      - 35th Communications Squadron
      - 35th Force Support Squadron
      - 35th Logistics Readiness Squadron
      - 35th Security Forces Squadron

Air Education and Training Command (AETC)

- Second Air Force
  - 82nd Training Wing
    - 982nd Training Group
      - 372nd Training Squadron
        - Detachment 23 (GSU)

Air Force Office of Special Investigations (AFOSI)

- Detachment 623 (GSU)

Civil Air Patrol (CAP)

- Misawa Cadet Squadron (NHQ-113)

=== United States Navy ===
Commander, Navy Installations Command (CNIC)

- Naval Air Facility Misawa
  - Air Operations Department – UC-12F Huron

Commander, Naval Air Force, Pacific (COMNAVAIRPAC)

- Patrol and Reconnaissance Wing 1
  - Task Force 72 – P-8A Poseidon
- E/A-18G Growler

=== United States Space Force ===
- Space Delta 4
  - 5th Space Warning Squadron
    - Detachment 4 (GSU)

=== Japan Air Self Defense Force ===
Air Defense Command (Japan)

- Northern Air Defense Force Headquarters
  - Northern Air Command Support Flight – Kawasaki T-4
  - 3rd Air Wing
    - 301st Tactical Fighter Squadron – F-35 Lightning II and T-4
    - 302nd Tactical Fighter Squadron – F-35 Lightning II and T-4
  - Airborne Early Warning Wing
    - 601st Squadron – E-2C Hawkeye
- Air Rescue Wing
  - Misawa Helicopter Airlift Squadron – CH-47J Chinook

== Climate ==
Like most of the Tōhoku region, the local area around Misawa AB has a humid temperate climate with warm summers, and cold, though not extreme, winters. The area has a humid continental climate (Köppen Dfa), with monthly averages ranging from −2 °C (28 °F) in January to 22 °C (72 °F) in August.

Climate data for Misawa AB, Aomori, Japan (Means 2007/01/01 - 2016/12/31)
Month	Jan	Feb	Mar	Apr	May	Jun	Jul	Aug	Sep	Oct	Nov	Dec	Year
Record high °F (°C)	59 (15)	61 (16)	70 (21)	86 (30)	88 (31)	93 (34)	97 (36)	97 (36)	94 (34)	82 (28)	73 (23)	63 (17)	97 (36)
Mean daily maximum °F (°C)	34 (1)	36 (2)	44 (7)	55 (13)	64 (18)	68 (20)	75 (24)	79 (26)	74 (23)	64 (18)	51 (11)	40 (4)	57 (14)
Daily mean °F (°C)	28 (−2)	29 (−2)	35 (2)	46 (8)	55 (13)	60 (16)	68 (20)	72 (22)	67 (19)	56 (13)	43 (6)	33 (1)	49 (9)
Mean daily minimum °F (°C)	24 (−4)	25 (−4)	31 (−1)	39 (4)	49 (9)	56 (13)	64 (18)	68 (20)	61 (16)	49 (9)	38 (3)	29 (−2)	45 (7)
Record low °F (°C)	5 (−15)	−4 (−20)	7 (−14)	19 (−7)	30 (−1)	37 (3)	45 (7)	48 (9)	39 (4)	30 (−1)	19 (−7)	10 (−12)	−4 (−20)
Average precipitation inches (mm)	2.6 (66)	2.3 (58)	2.6 (66)	2.8 (71)	3.1 (79)	3.9 (99)	5.0 (130)	5.4 (140)	6.5 (170)	4.0 (100)	3.0 (76)	2.5 (64)	43.0 (1,090)
Average snowfall inches (cm)	40.1 (102)	33.1 (84)	20.5 (52)	2.6 (6.6)	0.0 (0.0)	0.0 (0.0)	0.0 (0.0)	0.0 (0.0)	0.0 (0.0)	0.0 (0.0)	5.7 (14)	23.2 (59)	126.1 (320)
Average precipitation days (≥ 0.01 in)	8	7	9	10	10	9	11	12	11	11	12	10	119
Average snowy days (≥ 0.05 in)	17	14	10	2	0	0	0	0	0	0	3	11	56
Average relative humidity (%)	68.3	64.7	63.5	61.0	68.6	78.6	80.3	78.5	74.6	66.9	67.9	68.5	70.1
Source: AFCCC (Extremes 1948/04/08 - 2017/10/31)

== Education ==
The Department of Defense operates two schools that serve the children of the American military and civilian personnel stationed at the base.

- Sollars Elementary School, home of the Dragons
- Robert D. Edgren Middle/High School, home of the Eagles

Higher educational opportunities for those in the military and working for the Department of Defense, as well as for family members at Misawa are available through several contracted academic institutions. For example:

- The Asian Division of University of Maryland University College (UMUC)
- Central Texas College
- University of Phoenix

== See also ==
- AN/FLR-9
- Treaty of Mutual Cooperation and Security between the United States and Japan
- U.S.–Japan Status of Forces Agreement
