= USASA Field Station Augsburg =

Site of a Wullenweber AN/FLR-9 radio direction finder

Coordinates: 48°27′5″N 10°51′43″E

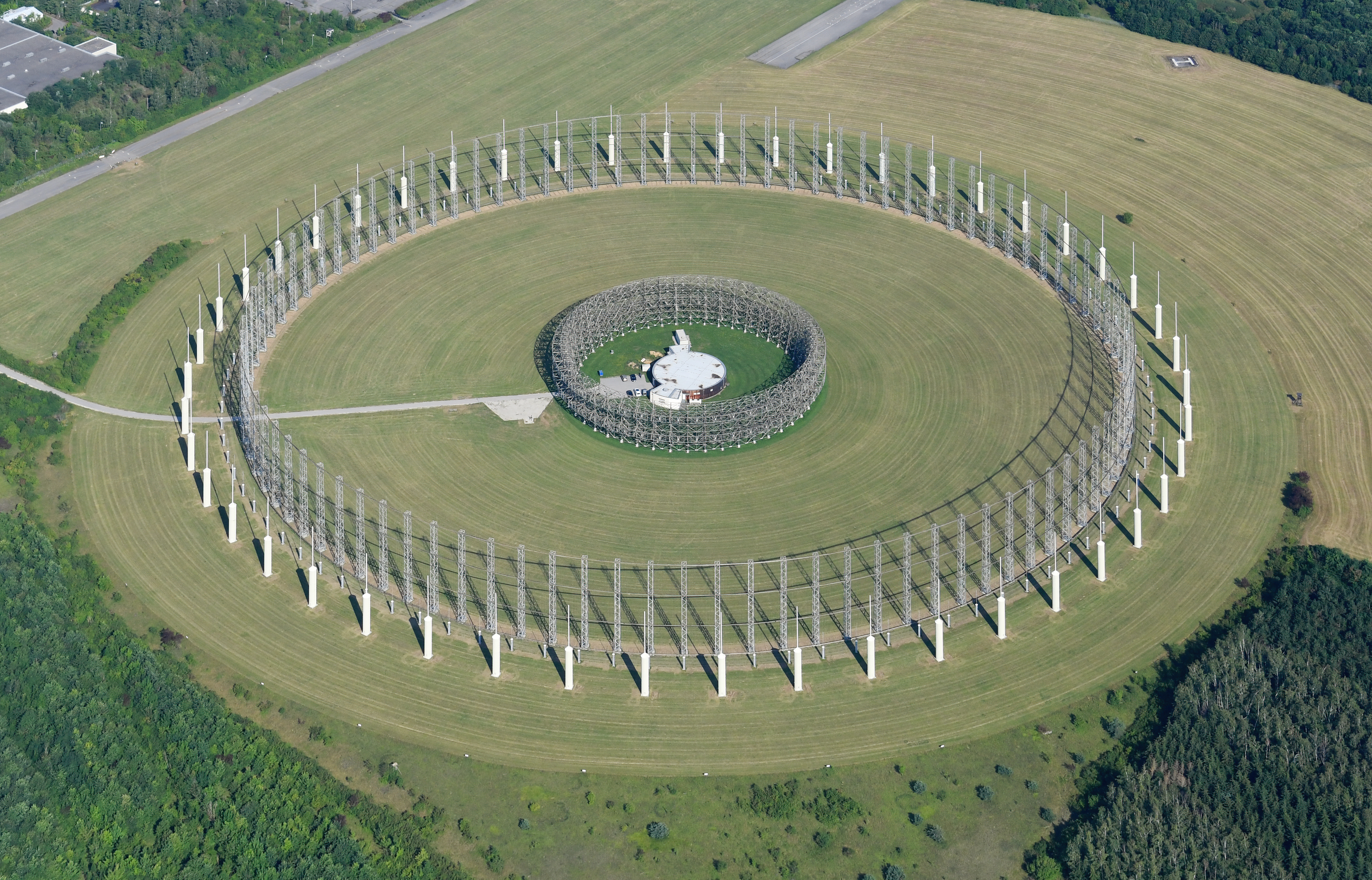
Aerial photograph of USASA Field Station Augsburg

United States Army Security Agency (USASA) Field Station Augsburg was the site of a Wullenweber AN/FLR-9 (V8) radio direction finder, established during the Cold War. Field Station Augsburg was located on Gablingen Kaserne, near the village of Gablingen just north of Augsburg in Bavaria, West Germany. It was one of nearly 20 field stations positioned strategically around the world by the U.S. Armed Forces during the Cold War. Field Station Augsburg opened in 1970 and closed in 1998, at which time it was turned over to the German government.

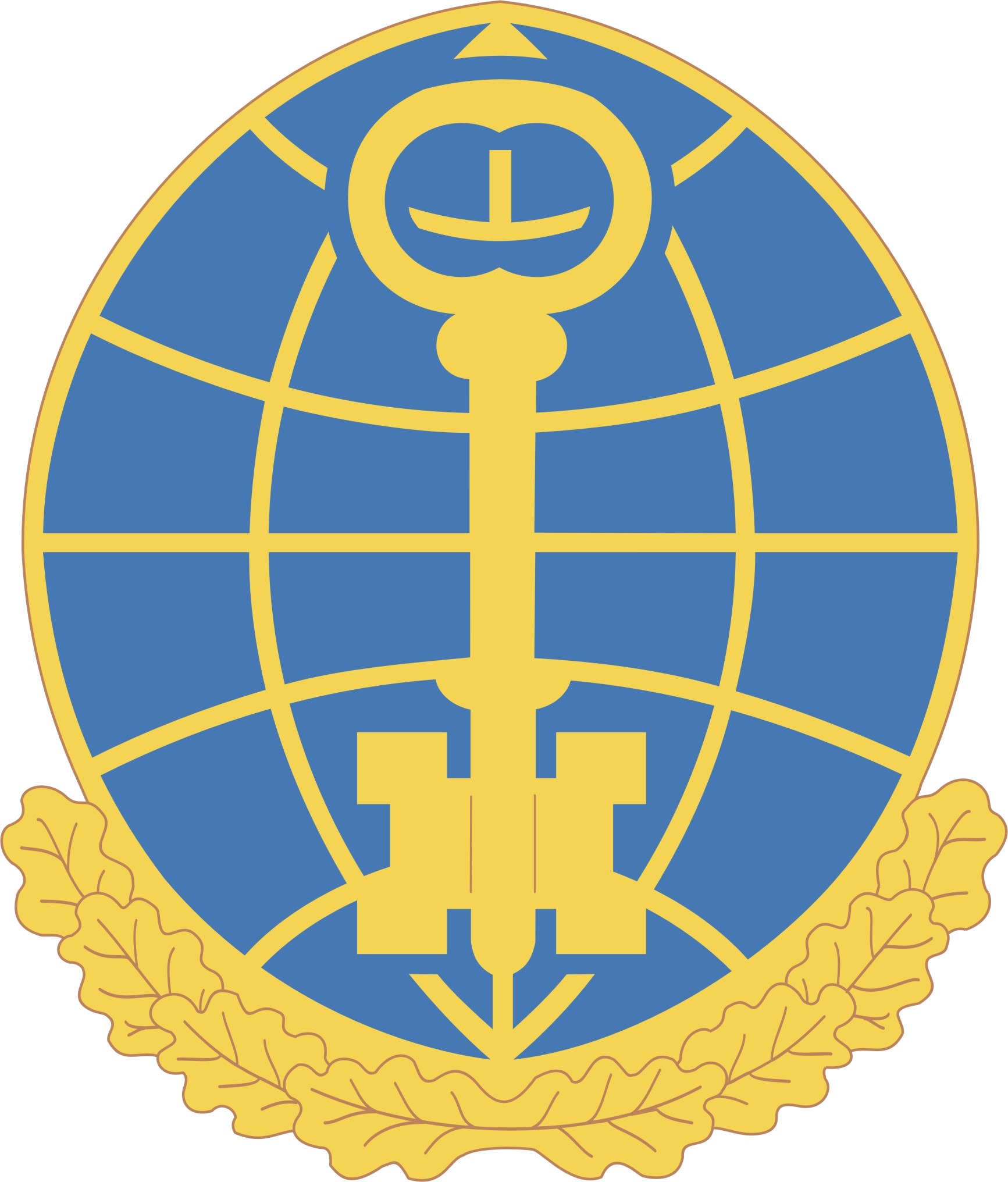
Unit Crest

The Station was owned and managed by the National Security Agency and staffed by the United States Army Security Agency (USASA), which later became U.S. Army Intelligence and Security Command (INSCOM), in conjunction with other branches of the U.S. Military and various allied forces. Personnel assigned to Field Station Augsburg were composed of individuals who scored high enough on the Army entrance exams to be classified as "ST" or a skilled technician, which is the Army's top-ranked job category. The Station was staffed 24 hours a day, by means of rotating shifts. The Station's mission was to monitor the communications of Cold War enemy nations, their allies, and client states around the world. The information gathered was time-sensitive and, based on its importance and classification, that information was collected, analyzed and passed through intelligence channels on a "real-time" basis.

Personnel assigned to the 1st, 2nd, and 3rd Operations Battalions and the Support (Service and Maintenance) Battalion, and the successor Military Intelligence (MI) units (701st Military Intelligence Brigade - 711th, 712th, 713th, & 714th MI Battalions) at Field Station Augsburg served as Morse and non-Morse Cryptologists, Voice Intercept, and Radio Direction-Finding Operators, as well as Traffic Analysts, Equipment Repair and Cryptanalysis/Cryptanalytic Technicians. Additional personnel from Augsburg based tactical units often loaned their personal. These included the 502nd MI, 409th MI, 328th MI, and 326th MI units located on Flak Kaserne.

In 1990, a group of six military intelligence analysts from the 701st deserted the station. They were arrested a few days later in Gulf Breeze, Florida and discharged from the military.

A Company of the 204th Military Intelligence Battalion was assigned to nearby Augsburg in 1991 until U.S. operations at the station ultimately ceased in 1998.

With the end of the Cold War, Field Station Augsburg lost much of its strategic value. It is currently reputedly used by the Bundesnachrichtendienst. The Wullenweber / Flair-9 antenna is still in place as of July 2024.
