= 13th Fighter Squadron =

United States Air Force combat squadron

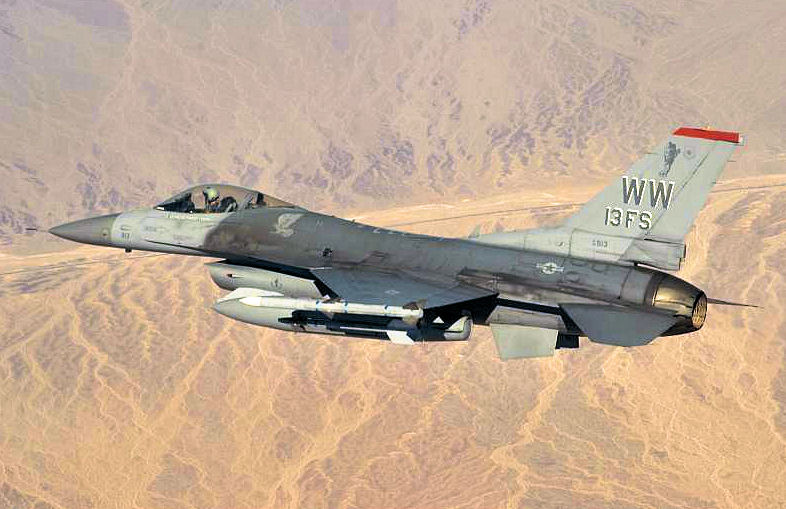
- Squadron F-16 Fighting Falcon departs for the Fort Irwin ranges (Note: Aircraft is General Dynamics F-16C Block 50, serial 92-3913. Taken on 20 August 2008, during exercise Green Flag 080-9 at Nellis AFB.)
- Active: 1942–1943; 1966–1975; 1976–1982; 1985–present
- Country: United States
- Branch: United States Air Force
- Role: Fighter
- Part of: Pacific Air Forces
- Garrison/HQ: Misawa Air Base, Japan
- Nickname: Panther Pack
- Motto: Cave Putorium (Latin for 'Beware the Weasel [sic]') (Note: A reference to the squadron's "Wild Weasel" mission. However, putor in Latin means polecat (skunk), the Latin word for weasel is mustela, so "Cave Mustelam" would be a more correct Latin motto.).
- Mascot: Eldridge (1971-1973)
- Engagements: Antisubmarine campaign Vietnam War; Operation Southern Watch; Operation Enduring Freedom; Operation Iraqi Freedom; Operation Inherent Resolve
- Decorations: Presidential Unit Citation; Air Force Outstanding Unit Award with Combat "V" Device; Republic of Vietnam Gallantry Cross with Palm

Insignia
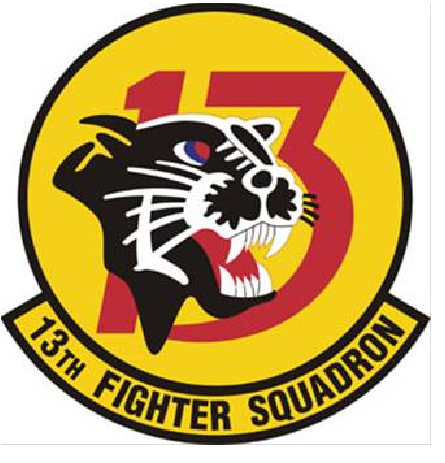
- 13th Fighter Squadron emblem (Note: Approved 16 August 2007.)

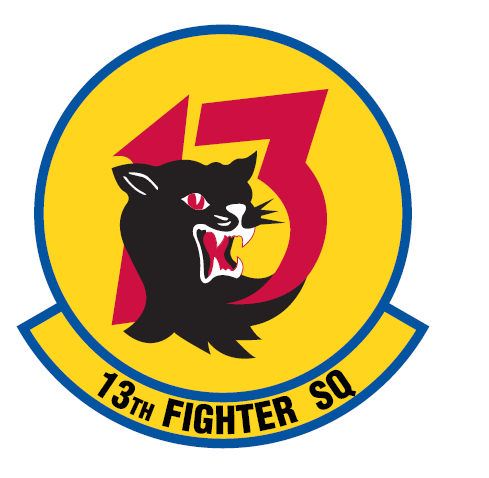
- 13th Tactical Fighter Squadron emblem (Note: Approved 15 August 1985. Description: On a yellow disc, a Black panther's head detailed White facing to the right with Red eye and tongue interlaced by the stylized Red Arabic numerals 1 and 3, all within a narrow blue border.)

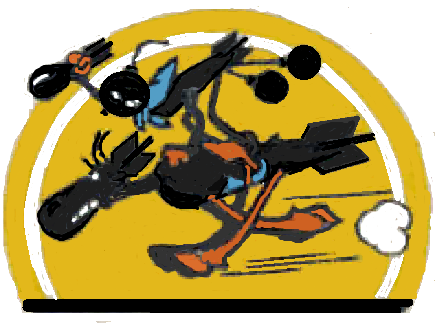
- 313th Bombardment Squadron emblem
- WW(1996-present) (Note: Representing the Wild Weasel mission.) MJ (1985-1996) (Note: Representing Misawa Japan.) MC (1976-1982) (Note: Representing MacDill.) OC (1967-1975): Tail Codes

The 13th Fighter Squadron is an active squadron of the United States Air Force. The squadron flies the General Dynamics F-16 Fighting Falcon and is part of the 35th Fighter Wing at Misawa Air Base, Japan.

The squadron's first predecessor is the 313th Bombardment Squadron, which was activated in 1942. The squadron served in the continental United States as a training unit until its 1943 disbanding, also participating in antisubmarine warfare in 1942.

The 13th Tactical Fighter Squadron was activated in 1966, fighting in the Vietnam War. The squadron flew Wild Weasel anti-surface-to-air missile missions with the Republic F-105 Thunderchief and McDonnell Douglas F-4 Phantom II, operating out of Korat Royal Thai Air Force Base. It moved to Udorn Royal Thai Air Force Base in October 1967, flying F-4s in combat air patrols against North Vietnamese MiGs and ground strike missions. The squadron was inactivated with the end of the war in 1975. The squadron was reactivated in 1976 as the 13th Tactical Fighter Training Squadron, a training squadron, at MacDill Air Force Base, Florida, and inactivated again in 1982. The squadron was reactivated as the 13th Tactical Fighter Squadron in 1985 at Misawa, flying the F-16. Shortly thereafter, it was consolidated with the 313th Squadron. It was redesignated the 13th Fighter Squadron in 1991.

== Mission ==
The 13th Fighter Squadron, "Panther Pack" operates the General Dynamics F-16 Fighting Falcon CM/DM Block 50 aircraft conducting air superiority missions. The Panthers provide offensive and defensive counter-air capabilities, and specialize in the role of Suppression of Enemy Air Defenses.

== History ==
=== World War II ===
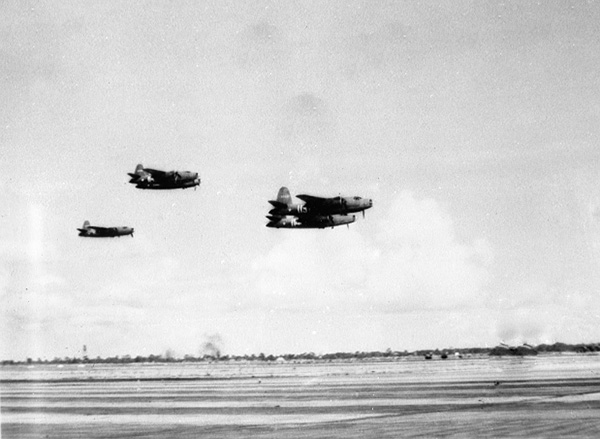
21st Bombardment Group B-26 Marauders at MacDill Field

The squadron's first predecessor was constituted as the 313th Bombardment Squadron and activated on 1 February 1942 at Bowman Field, Kentucky, one of the original three squadrons of the 21st Bombardment Group. It moved a week later to Jackson Army Air Base, Mississippi, where it began to organize with North American B-25 Mitchells. The squadron moved to Columbia Army Air Base, South Carolina on 24 April. At Columbia, the unit became a medium bomber Operational Training Unit (OTU). The OTU program involved the use of an oversized parent unit to provide cadres to "satellite groups" The program was patterned after the unit training system of the Royal Air Force. It assumed responsibility for training the satellite groups and oversaw their expansion with graduates of Army Air Forces Training Command schools to become effective combat units. Phase I training concentrated on individual training in crewmember specialties. Phase II training emphasized the coordination for the crew to act as a team. The final phase concentrated on operation as a unit.

On 26 May the 313th Squadron moved to Key Field, Mississippi. The squadron interrupted its training mission on 8 June to fly an antisubmarine warfare mission from Hattiesburg Army Air Field, Mississippi, returning to Key Field a few days later. It moved to MacDill Field, Florida on 26 June 1942. At MacDill, the squadron converted to Martin B-26 Marauders. It again flew antisubmarine missions between 31 July and 8 August 1942. The 313th began replacement training operations from May to July 1943, but resumed its OTU mission at MacDill until it was disbanded on 10 October 1943, as MacDill prepared to transition to Boeing B-17 Flying Fortress training.

=== Vietnam War ===
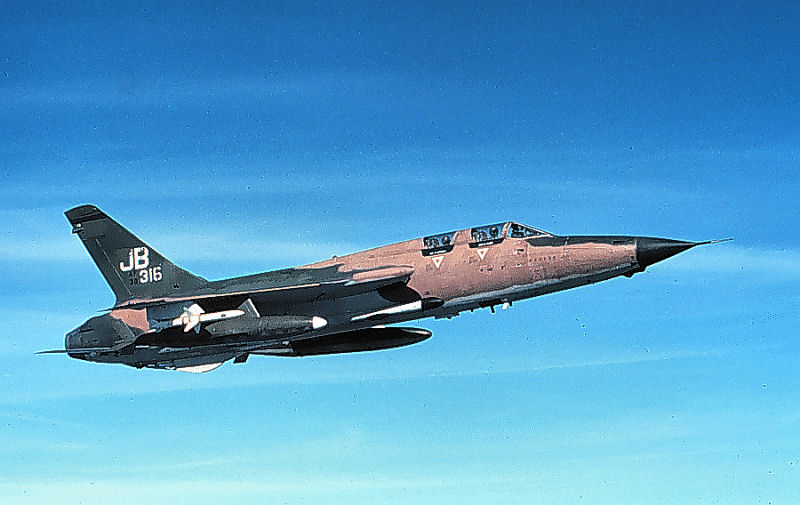
F-105 Wild Weasel fighter of the 388th Wing

On 2 May 1966, the 13th Tactical Fighter Squadron was activated at Korat Royal Thai Air Force Base. Although nominally assigned to the 18th Tactical Fighter Wing at Kadena Air Base, Okinawa, the squadron was operationally controlled by the 388th Tactical Fighter Wing at Korat. The squadron was initially equipped with Republic F-105 Thunderchiefs modified to the Wild Weasel III configuration for the Suppression of Enemy Air Defenses mission. On 3 June 1967 Major Ralph L. Kuster, Jr. of the squadron shot down a MiG-17 with his F-105D's 20-millimeter cannon. This was the first aerial victory of the squadron.

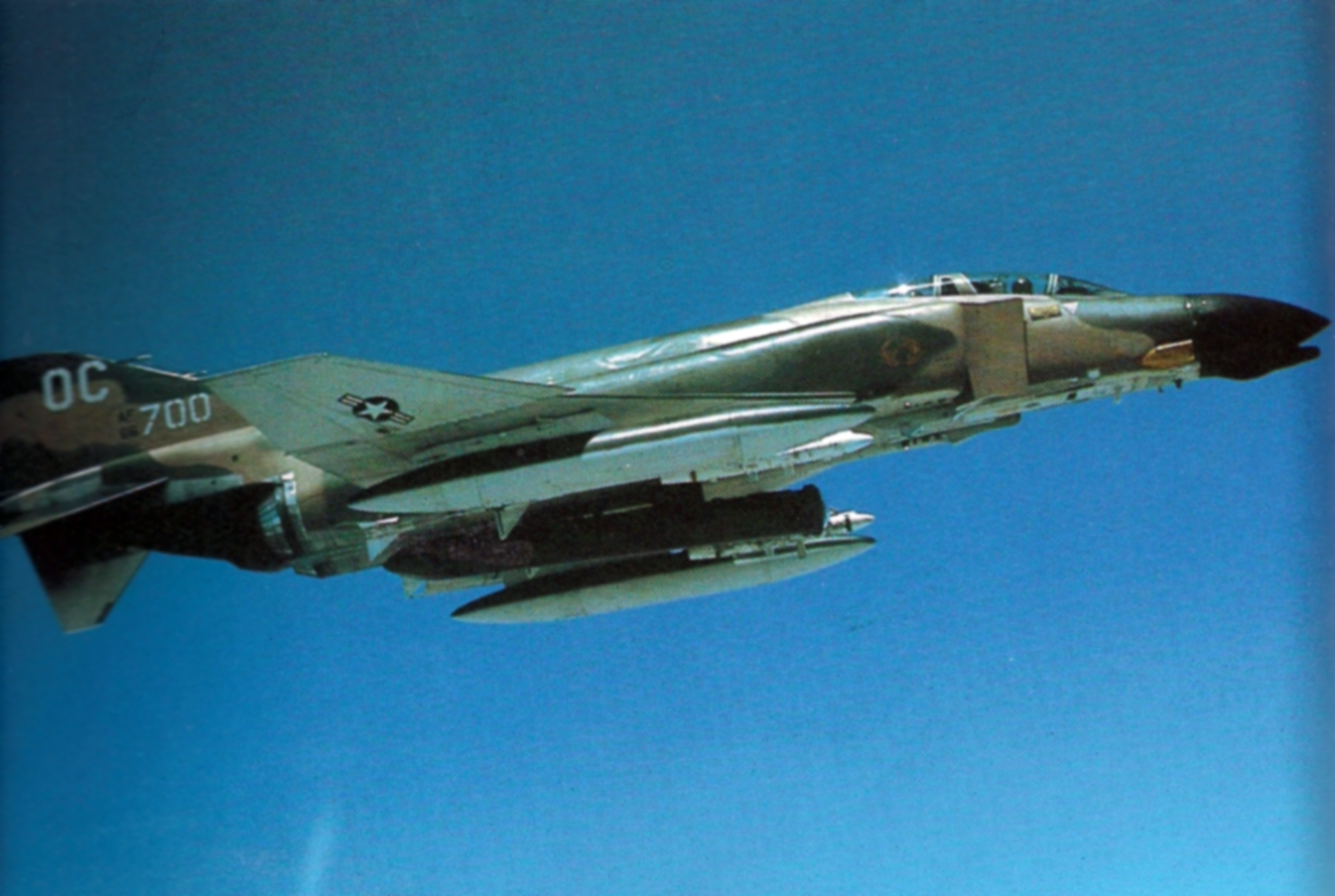
A squadron F-4D over Vietnam in 1971, carrying a Pave Sword laser pod.

Eldridge, mascot of 13th Tactical Fighter Squadron

In October 1967, the squadron moved to Udorn Royal Thai Air Force Base, where it become part of the 432d Tactical Reconnaissance Wing and began flying the McDonnell Douglas F-4D Phantom II. The 13th remained at Udorn for the remainder of the war. In 1971, the squadron adopted a panther named "Eldridge" as a mascot (Note: The mascot was named for Black Panther leader Eldridge Cleaver.) In 1972, Capt Jeffrey Feinstein, a squadron weapon systems officer, flying cannon-armed F-4Es became the last USAF ace of the war, recording five victories over enemy MiG-21 fighters. The victory that made him an ace came on 13 October 1972 and was the squadron's last aerial victory of the war. In May 1975, the squadron flew its last combat missions in Southeast Asia during the Mayaguez incident.

During the war, the squadron compiled 21 aerial victories, including 11 MiG kills, and flew more than 30,000 combat sorties. The squadron was inactivated in June 1975 as the United States withdrew its operational forces from Thailand.

=== Replacement training unit ===
The squadron was activated on 15 January 1976 at MacDill Air Force Base as the 13th Tactical Fighter Training Squadron and assigned to the 56th Tactical Fighter Wing. The squadron conducted F-4E aircraft pilot and weapon systems officer replacement training at MacDill. The squadron was inactivated on 1 July 1982.

=== Misawa Air Base ===
The squadron was again designated the 13th Tactical Fighter Squadron and activated at Misawa Air Base, Japan in June 1985, where it was once more assigned to the 432d Fighter Wing flying the General Dynamics F-16 Fighting Falcon. The 13th became the first permanent fighter squadron stationed on the home islands of Japan since 1972. On 19 September, the 313th Bombardment Squadron was consolidated with the squadron. On 31 May 1991, the 13th was redesignated the 13th Fighter Squadron and assigned to the 432nd Operations Group as part of the Air Force's Objective Wing reorganization. The squadron deployed aircraft and personnel to southwest and central Asia, where the participated in operations over Iraq and Afghanistan. It was transferred to the 35th Operations Group on 1 October 1994, part of an organizational realignment to ensure wings with rich heritages remained active.

The squadron achieved initial operational capability in F-16CJs in 1996. On 8 July of that year, the squadron became the first Pacific Air Forces F-16 unit to deploy in support of Operation Southern Watch, enforcing the no-fly zone over southern Iraq, as a result of a policy change allowing all units the opportunity to deploy. In August 1996, Iraqi forces struck Kurds in Irbil. The United States responded with Operation Desert Strike. Deployed squadron elements destroyed an Iraqi SA-8 site and Roland missile system with AGM-88 HARM missiles. Again, in July 1998, squadron members were protecting coalition aircraft when British pilots operating near Basra found that Iraqi radar had locked onto them and were preparing to fire. Squadron aircraft launched an AGM-88 at the Iraqi radar, forcing the Iraqi missile battery to turn off its radar.

From 1996 to 2020, the 13th deployed to Afghanistan, Iraq and Jordan, including in 2014 to Jordan where the Panthers opened the US air campaign against the Islamic State in what would become known as Operation Inherent Resolve. It has participated in Commando Sling exercises with the Royal Malaysian Air Force and Commando West exercises with the Singapore Air Force.

In 2025, the 35th Wing began to retire its F-16s, while the Air Force would begin temporarily deploying Lockheed Martin F-35 Lightning IIs to Misawa. Rotations will continue until Misawa upgrades its fighter fleet to the F-35 in 2026.

== Lineage ==
313th Bombardment Squadron

- Constituted as the 313th Bombardment Squadron (Medium) on 13 January 1942

Activated on 1 February 1942
Disbanded on 10 October 1943

- Reconstituted and consolidated with the 13th Tactical Fighter Squadron on 19 September 1985

13th Fighter Squadron

- Constituted as the 13th Tactical Fighter Squadron and activated on 2 May 1966 (not organized)

Organized on 15 May 1966
Inactivated on 30 June 1975

- Redesignated 13th Tactical Fighter Training Squadron on 18 December 1975

Activated on 15 January 1976
Inactivated on 1 July 1982

- Redesignated 13th Tactical Fighter Squadron on 5 June 1984

Activated on 1 June 1985

- Consolidated with the 313th Bombardment Squadron on 19 September 1985

Redesignated as 13th Fighter Squadron on 31 May 1991

=== Assignments ===
- 21st Bombardment Group, 1 February 1942 – 10 October 1943
- Pacific Air Forces, 2 May 1966 (not organized)
- 18th Tactical Fighter Wing, 15 May 1966 (attached to 388th Tactical Fighter Wing until 17 October 1967)
- 432d Tactical Reconnaissance Wing (later 432d Tactical Fighter Wing), 15 November 1967 – 30 June 1975
- 56th Tactical Fighter Wing (later 56th Tactical Training Wing), 15 January 1976 – 1 July 1982
- 432d Tactical Fighter Wing, 1 June 1985
- 432d Operations Group, 31 May 1991
- 35th Operations Group, 1 October 1994 – present

=== Stations ===
- Bowman Field, Kentucky, 1 February 1942
- Jackson Army Air Base, Mississippi, 8 February 1942
- Columbia Army Air Base, South Carolina, 21 April 1942
- Key Field, Mississippi, 24 May 1942
- Hattiesburg Army Air Field, Mississippi, 7 June 1942
- Key Field, Mississippi, 12 June 1942
- MacDill Field, Florida, 26 June 1942 – 10 October 1943
- Korat Royal Thai Air Force Base, Thailand, 15 May 1966
- Udorn Royal Thai Air Force Base, Thailand, 20 October 1967 – 30 June 1975
- MacDill Air Force Base, Florida, 15 January 1976 – 1 July 1982 (operated From: Tyndall Air Force Base, Florida, 26 November–22 December 1979)
- Misawa Air Base, Japan, 1 June 1985 – present

=== Aircraft ===
- Douglas B-18 Bolo (1942)
- Douglas A-20 Havoc (1942)
- North American B-25 Mitchell (1942)
- Martin B-26 Marauder (1942–1943)
- Republic F-105 Thunderchief (1966–1967)
- McDonnell Douglas F-4 Phantom II (1967–1982)
- General Dynamics F-16 Fighting Falcon (1985–2025)
- Lockheed Martin F-35 Lightning II (2026-present)

=== Awards and campaigns ===
Award streamer	Award	Dates	Notes
	Presidential Unit Citation	10 March 1967–1 May 1967	Southeast Asia 13th Tactical Fighter Squadron
	Presidential Unit Citation	19 September 1967–1 November 1968	Southeast Asia 13th Tactical Fighter Squadron
	Presidential Unit Citation	1 November 1968–31 October 1969	Southeast Asia 13th Tactical Fighter Squadron
	Air Force Outstanding Unit Award with Combat "V" Device	29–30 June 1966	13th Tactical Fighter Squadron
	Air Force Outstanding Unit Award with Combat "V" Device	1 July 1966–30 June 1967	13th Tactical Fighter Squadron
	Air Force Outstanding Unit Award with Combat "V" Device	1 July 1967–30 June 1968	13th Tactical Fighter Squadron
	Air Force Outstanding Unit Award with Combat "V" Device	21 November 1969–20 November 1970	13th Tactical Fighter Squadron
	Air Force Outstanding Unit Award with Combat "V" Device	21 November 1970–6 April 1971	13th Tactical Fighter Squadron
	Air Force Outstanding Unit Award with Combat "V" Device	18 December 1972–27 January 1973	13th Tactical Fighter Squadron
	Air Force Outstanding Unit Award	1 January 1977–1 January 1979	13th Tactical Fighter Training Squadron
	Air Force Outstanding Unit Award	1 July 1980–30 June 1982	13th Tactical Fighter Training Squadron
	Air Force Outstanding Unit Award	1 January 1991-31 December 1991	13th Tactical Fighter Squadron (later 13th Fighter Squadron)
	Air Force Outstanding Unit Award	1 October 1992-30 September 1994	13th Fighter Squadron
	Air Force Outstanding Unit Award	1 October 1995-30 September 1996	13th Fighter Squadron
	Air Force Outstanding Unit Award	1 October 1997-30 September 1999	13th Fighter Squadron
	Air Force Outstanding Unit Award	1 October 1999-30 September 2001	13th Fighter Squadron
	Air Force Outstanding Unit Award	1 October 2001-30 September 2003	13th Fighter Squadron
	Air Force Outstanding Unit Award	1 July 2004-31 May 2006	13th Fighter Squadron
	Air Force Outstanding Unit Award	1 October 2008-30 September 2010	13th Fighter Squadron
	Air Force Outstanding Unit Award	1 March 2011-28 February 2013	13th Fighter Squadron
	Vietnamese Gallantry Cross with Palm	15 May 1966–28 Jan 1973	13th Tactical Fighter Squadron (Note: In addition to the unit awards earned by the squadron, it is also entitled to display the unit awards earned by the 13th Expeditionary Fighter Squadron, including an Air Force Meritorious Unit Award for 1 June 20100 to 31 May 2011 and an Air Force Outstanding Unit Award for 14 April to 4 October 2014. DAF Instruction 84-105 Orbanizational Lineage, Honors and Heraldry, 27 June 2021, para. 2.2.1.3; "Air Force Personnel Services: Unit Awards". Air Force Personnel Center. (search))

Campaign Streamer	Campaign	Dates	Notes
	American Campaign Antisubmarine	1 February 1942–10 October 1943 (Note: Period is for American Campaign service. Antisubmarine Campaign credit is only for 8 June 1942 – 8 August 1942.)	313th Bombardment Squadron
	Vietnam Air	15 May 1966–28 June 1966	13th Tactical Fighter Squadron
	Vietnam Air Offensive	29 June 1966–8 March 1967	13th Tactical Fighter Squadron
	Vietnam Air Offensive, Phase II	9 March 1967–31 March 1968	13th Tactical Fighter Squadron
	Vietnam Air/Ground	22 January 1968–7 July 1968	13th Tactical Fighter Squadron
	Vietnam Air Offensive, Phase III	1 April 1968–31 October 1968	13th Tactical Fighter Squadron
	Vietnam Air Offensive, Phase IV	1 November 1968–22 February 1969	13th Tactical Fighter Squadron
	Tet 1969/Counteroffensive	23 February 1969–8 June 1969	13th Tactical Fighter Squadron
	Vietnam Summer-Fall 1969	9 June 1969–31 October 1969	13th Tactical Fighter Squadron
	Vietnam Winter-Spring 1970	3 November 1969–30 April 1970	13th Tactical Fighter Squadron
	Sanctuary Counteroffensive	1 May 1970–30 June 1970	13th Tactical Fighter Squadron
	Southwest Monsoon	1 July 1970–30 November 1970	13th Tactical Fighter Squadron
	Commando Hunt V	1 December 1970–14 May 1971	13th Tactical Fighter Squadron
	Commando Hunt VI	15 May 1971–31 July 1971	13th Tactical Fighter Squadron
	Commando Hunt VII	1 November 1971–29 March 1972	13th Tactical Fighter Squadron
	Vietnam Ceasefire Campaign	29 March 1972–28 January 1973	13th Tactical Fighter Squadron
	Global War on Terror Expeditionary Medal		13th Fighter Squadron
	Liberation of Iraq	19 March 2003–1 May 2003	13th Fighter Squadron
	Iraqi Surge	10 January 2007–31 December 2008	13th Fighter Squadron

== See also ==
- List of United States Air Force fighter squadrons
- List of Douglas A-20 Havoc operators
- List of Martin B-26 Marauder operators
- List of F-105 units of the United States Air Force
- List of F-4 Phantom II operators
- General Dynamics F-16 Fighting Falcon operators
