= Gulf Breeze UFO incident =

1987 claimed UFO sightings in Florida

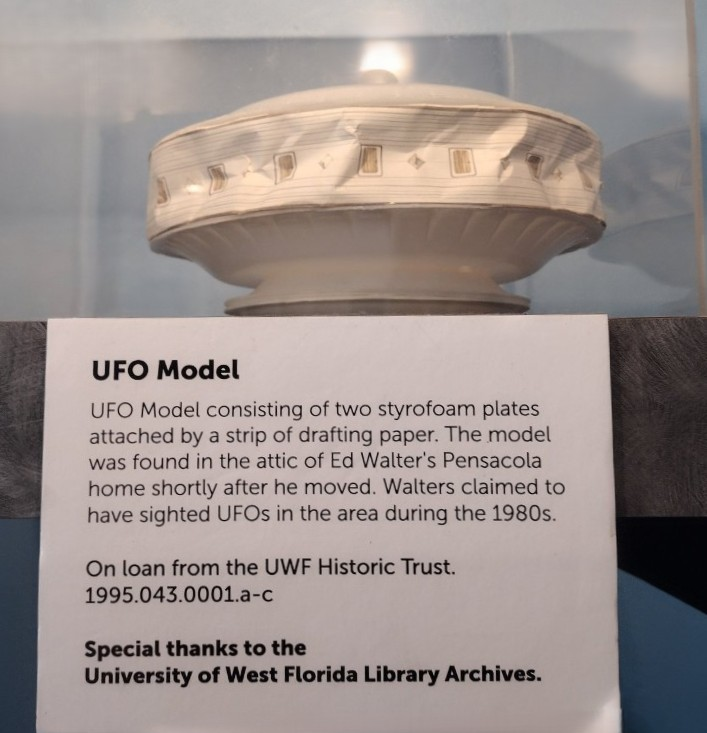
- Date: November 11, 1987 – May 1, 1988
- Location: Gulf Breeze, Florida, U.S.

The Gulf Breeze UFO incident was a series of claimed UFO sightings in Gulf Breeze, Florida, United States, during late 1987 and early 1988 that began with a claim by local contractor Ed Walters of having taken photos of a UFO that were then published in the now-defunct community newspaper Gulf Breeze Sentinel. UFOlogists such as Bruce Maccabee believed the photographs were genuine; however, others strongly suspected them to be a hoax. In the aftermath, other residents in the area came forward with reports of having seen UFOs.

Pensacola News Journal reporter Craig Myers investigated Walters' claims a few years later, criticizing the Sentinel's coverage of the story as "uncritical" and "sensationalist". In 1990, after Walters and his family had moved, the new owners of their house discovered a styrofoam model UFO hidden in the attic. Myers was able to duplicate the object in the Walters photographs almost exactly using the model UFO. Walters later claimed that the model UFO had been "planted" in the attic.

== Events of November 11, 1987 – May 1, 1988 ==
On November 11, 1987, Ed Walters, a contractor in Gulf Breeze, Florida, was allegedly immobilized "briefly by a blue beam", after which he took five Polaroids of an object in the sky outside his home. Walters reported seeing the object hover about 200 feet (61 m) above the ground, describing it as being "right out of a Spielberg movie". He claimed to have made multiple subsequent visits to the UFO, recording videotape and taking 32 photographs of the object.

Walters further reported witnessing the craft land on Soundside Drive and "deposit five aliens on the road". He stated that one of the aliens stared into his window, at which point the aliens communicated with him in English and Spanish via telepathy and presented him with a book showing pictures of dogs. A blue beam of light then caused him to be lifted three feet (0.91 m) off the ground. Walters stated that the immobilization in the blue beam happened again on December 2, 1987.

On February 7, 1988, Walters allegedly photographed his wife attempt to outrun the blue beam. Walters also claimed to have communicated further with the aliens; he or his family reported nineteen sightings or encounters over time. On May 1, 1988, Walters reported feeling the alien presence while he was at Shoreline Park after midnight, saw the UFO and took a photo of it, then "lost consciousness for an hour". Walters stated that the UFO leaked some kind of liquid that continued to boil even nineteen days after he captured it.

== Investigation ==
Walters gave his photographs of the purported UFO to the Gulf Breeze Sentinel newspaper, using the aliases of "Mr. X", "Mr. Ed" or "Jim" out of concern for being ridiculed and to protect his family. However, Walters openly admitted to being the photographer by 1989. He submitted to a polygraph test in February 1988, with the examiner concluding that "Walters believes his photos are real". The Gulf Breeze Sentinel was later purchased by the Pensacola News Journal and it ceased operation.

Walters claimed to have experienced missing time on three prior occasions, once during a canoe trip, the second time during an apparent nightmare, and the third when he had been driving at night and realized he could no longer see any car or streetlights. On the third occasion, Walters claimed to have stepped out of his car and seen a bright light coming toward him, which "lifted off the road" when he got back inside the car and illuminated its interior. He reported finding himself next to morning traffic five hours later. Under hypnosis, Walters stated that he discovered that he had been "abducted by aliens on several occasions".

Paranormal investigator Ray Stanford focused on the clouds in the background of Walters' photos, initially believing they could not have been taken on November 11, 1987, due to incorrect weather information he had received. After receiving the correct weather data, he conceded that the photos were likely taken on that day, but still believed they were a hoax. UFO investigator Phillip Klass stated that there was "no way" the photos were authentic but stated that he had not investigated the Gulf Breeze incident at length as it was not "genuinely impressive to the public". Robert Nathan of NASA's Jet Propulsion Laboratory stated that "many of these images are double exposure photographs". Nathan also said that he had a "feeling that there is some kind of a cut and paste on some surface". Ed Gray, the mayor of Gulf Breeze, extensively analyzed the photos himself and also concluded they were fake.

UFO researcher Budd Hopkins interviewed Walters several times and believed his claims were genuine, citing the fact that Walters had turned down a $100,000 book deal and passed a polygraph test. Optical physicist and UFOlogist Bruce Maccabee investigated five of Walters' Polaroids and stated, "I think there is a good chance it's the real thing". Maccabee instructed Walters to use two Polaroid cameras mounted on a beam when photographing in order to triangulate the images for clearer analysis. Willy Smith from the UFO information-gathering group UNICAT reported spotting a support under the UFO in the photos, "indicating that the object is a model that was painted". Maccabee claimed that other eyewitness sightings were more important than the photographs.

Eglin Air Force Base is located nearly 40 miles east of Gulf Breeze and is a "military installation of mind-boggling proportions". The base's Director of Public Affairs has said that there is no record of unusual activity or "strange radar blips" at the time of the alleged sightings. Jerry Brown, Gulf Breeze's chief of police, thought that locals were mistaking activity on the base for UFO phenomena, which he blamed on the "domino effect of hysteria that began with Walters' photos".

== Eyewitness reports ==
After the Sentinel published Walters' photographs, both the paper and the Mutual UFO Network (MUFON) received dozens of reports of sightings in the Gulf Breeze area. Various reports described an orange glow, orange or blue beams of light, and an oval or oblong craft. One woman reported being awakened at 2:00am to find an orange-lit UFO in her yard. In July 1988, Fenner McConnell and his wife Shirley claimed to have seen a "disc-shaped" airplane with no wings flying over water, with landing lights shining on their pier. Shirley later recognized the alleged craft from the Sentinel articles.

Brenda Pollak, a Gulf Breeze councilwoman and acquaintance of Walters, reported seeing an orange light along the treetops while driving across the Pensacola Bay Bridge on March 17, 1988. When she got home to tell her husband Buddy, she learned he had been at Shoreline Park where he and others were looking at Walters' photographs. When the group left to get hot chocolate, leaving Walters alone at the park, they saw flashes of light and rushed back to find that he had taken Polaroids of a UFO. Brenda denied that Walters was the sort of man who would perpetuate a hoax. She reported another sighting on January 8, 1990. Another local dignitary, Santa Rosa County Commissioner John Broxson, claimed that he and several acquaintances had seen "something bright ... hovering above his home: a parade of lights of different colors and intensity."

Art and Mary Hufford claimed to have seen "something gray, oval and silent fly over the treetops" that stayed in view for several minutes when they were driving in early November 1987, recognizing the object in Walters' photographs. Jeff Thompson reported that he and his 12-year-old son watched a three-foot-wide (0.91 m) and two-foot-high (0.61 m) craft for about ten minutes outside his Tiger Point residence on February 8, 1989. He approached the craft with a flashlight and when he was "within 30 feet (10 yd; 9.1 m), the top of the craft turned white and made a crackling noise" and then "'just dissipated'". Thompson also stated that he watched a UFO being chased by two military jets on the same day as Walters' alleged UFO encounter. A tollbooth operator, Jerry Thompson (no relation), said that he and a group of people watched thirteen pink-lighted objects blink in a pattern that he could not identify. Residents reported seeing eight helicopters chasing a UFO on January 8, 1990, something the United States Navy denied.

== UFO research group response ==
Supporters of Walters, particularly members of MUFON, cited the mass sightings as proof that the Gulf Breeze phenomena were genuine. Walter Andrus, MUFON's director, stated in June 1988 that the Gulf Breeze incident was the "best case we've ever had". Donald Ware, the group's Florida director, stated, "I am convinced the reason one man [Walters] was given so many photographic opportunities is because the aliens wanted us to see those photos". Statistics compiled by Willy Smith stated that MUFON's membership "increased fourfold since" after the Gulf Breeze case was publicized.

The Center for UFO Studies (CUFOS), a group founded by astronomer and ufologist J. Allen Hynek, stated that Walters' photos were fake based on the fact that the windows on the craft were not spaced evenly and because of a "waviness in the photos suggesting they were taken near or reflected off, water". Mark Rodeghier and Robert Boyd, also of CUFOS, were informed by friends of Walters that he was "known as a practical joker and prankster" who had told people he was going to "pull off 'the ultimate prank'". These acquaintances also noted several "curious parallels" between Walters' story and Whitley Streiber's book Communion, which had been published a few months before the first alleged sighting.

== Model discovered ==
On June 10, 1990, Pensacola News Journal reporter Craig Myers published that a model, closely resembling the UFO seen in the photos and made up of "four plastic foam plates and some drafting paper", was found in Walters' former home in Gulf Breeze. Walters refused to take a polygraph test but signed a "sworn statement denying any knowledge of the model UFO". The homeowner who found the model also signed a sworn statement, stating that "he did not know who made it". News Journal photographers experimented with the model and were able to "nearly duplicate some of the photos of UFO's printed in Walters' book".

The model was nine inches (23 cm) across, five inches (13 cm) deep, and included a blue-color gel (plastic film) and a six-inch "orange paper ring; a 3.5-inch-long (8.9 cm) plastic tube; and a 2-inch-wide (5.1 cm) paper ring between the 9-inch (23 cm) plates" with electrical tape at the bottom of the model. On drafting paper were "carefully drawn and punched out 'windows'" which encircled two-thirds of the model. On the reverse side of the drafting paper were hand-written dimensions for a house on Jamestown Drive, written "in what appears to be Ed Walters' handwriting ... According to Santa Rosa County building permits ... Walters has built at least two homes on Jamestown Drive".

The model was discovered under insulation in the home's attic after Walters and his family had moved out in 1988. The new homeowner did not report its discovery until he was interviewed by a journalist about UFOs. Walters denied any knowledge of the model and claimed that either "UFO debunkers" or the U.S. government had planted it. He later claimed to the News Journal that his wife was told by a former neighbor that a "stranger with out-of-state license tags entered the garage, pulled the attic stairs down, entered the attic and then left suddenly". Gulf Breeze police stated no break-ins had been reported at Walters' house.

The discovery of the model proved instantly divisive within the UFO community, with Walters' supporters repeating his claim that the model had been planted. Boyd, formerly a director of MUFON, later said he was forced to leave the group when he expressed doubt in the photos. News Journal columnist Mark Curtis reported that two MUFON investigators who confirmed the hoax were themselves "literally chased out of MUFON by its remaining 'true believers'".

Contrary to claims by his supporters that he had refused money for telling his story, the News Journal reported that Walters had been given a $200,000 book advance and offered $450,000 by the American Broadcasting Company (ABC) for miniseries rights. The paper also reported that Walters had previously served eighteen months in prison for a 1967 forgery and auto theft charge; he was granted a pardon by Governor Bob Martinez in March 1990.

== Renewed interest after 1990 ==
UFO sightings continued at the Pensacola Bay Bridge into 1991, attracting a multitude of skywatchers armed with cameras and microphones.

In a February 1993 News Journal editorial, Curtis revisited the evidence against Walters' account, mentioning a friend of the Walters family, Tommy Smith had come forward admitting to have "witnessed Ed faking the UFO pictures" as a practical joke. Curtis also reported that Walter and his wife had divorced in November 1992, splitting $2.5 million in assets that Curtis believed came from the hoax.

In response to the Gulf Breeze sightings, MUFON held its first annual UFO symposium in nearby Pensacola in 1990, attracting hundreds of attendees; the conference continued for the remainder of the decade. The director of tourism for Gulf Breeze said that the free publicity attracted tourists and UFO sightseers. A local travel agent said she arranged 600 flights for the MUFON conference. Merchants began selling UFO-related goods. MUFON disconnected its hotline for Gulf Breeze in 2000 after sightings had ceased. While the Gulf Breeze Six were in the area at about the same time as the conference was taking place, it is not clear that any member of the group of United States military deserters attended.

== In the media ==
On October 5, 1988, Unsolved Mysteries and later a TV special called "UFO Cover-UP...Live!" featured the Gulf Breeze UFO case. In 1989 eyewitness Shirley McConnell talked about her experience on A Current Affair. Unsolved Mysteries, Inside Edition and A Current Affair filmed more UFO shows in July 1990. On a 1994 episode of The X-Files character Fox Mulder mentions the Gulf Breeze UFO Photos to his partner Dana Scully saying that "the first time he saw the ... photos, he knew they were fakes".

Gulf Breeze singer, Ken Manning won an award for Best Music Video at the Florida Motion Picture & Television Association's Crystal Reel awards in 1999 for his song "Gulf Breeze UFO".
