= San Vito dei Normanni Air Station =

United States Air Force facility in Italy

- Part of United States Air Forces in Europe (USAFE)
- Located near: San Vito dei Normanni, Italy

Location
- Location within Italy
- Coordinates: 40°38′46″N 017°50′25″E

San Vito dei Normanni Air Station was a United States Air Force facility located 7 miles (11 km) west of Brindisi, Apulia, between the port of Brindisi and the town of San Vito dei Normanni, Italy.

== 1960 - Base activated ==
Staffed by the 7275th Air Base Group, San Vito AB began as an off-base installation of Aviano Air Base with support personnel and equipment furnished by the 6900th Security Wing in 1960. It became a primary installation on 1 March 1961, operated since its activation by the United States Air Force Security Service (USAFSS).

== 1964 - High frequency monitoring array ==
In 1964, a HF monitoring/receiving system of a large circular antenna array for COMINT purposes was installed. This AN/FLR-9 receiving system was operational until October 1994.

== 1979 - 6917th Electronic Security Group ==
On 1 October 1979, the base reverted to HQ Sixteenth AF (USAFE), hosting the 6917th Electronic Security Group and other assigned U.S. and Allied units and organizations.

== 1990 - Air Force Space Command establishes tenant unit ==
In 1990, Air Force Space Command established a tenant unit at San Vito Air Station. Detachment 1, 73rd Space Surveillance Group was a deep space surveillance mission whose job was to search for earth-orbiting objects, generate positional (Element Set) data to identify the objects location in space, and provide that data to the Cheyenne Mountain Space Surveillance Center located in Cheyenne Mountain, Colorado Springs, Colorado. The detachment consisted of a Transportable Optical System (TOS) and a large signal detection dish antenna. The TOS, developed by Sandia National Laboratories, was a high resolution telescope used to detect visible light reflected off orbiting objects, while the large receiver dish passively received transmission signals from orbiting satellites. These two operations together were called the Combined Radio Frequency/Optical Space Surveillance (CROSS) system.

== 1990 - Finding a satellite ==
December 1990 was an important time in the history of the TOS. The Galileo probe (launched October 1989) was scheduled for a flyby of Earth before proceeding with its mission, but NASA was having trouble acquiring the satellite to verify/correct its position. Failure to command the satellite and/or confirm its current/planned flight path could cause mission failure. In an effort to find the probe, NASA sent out a call for help to United States Space Command, asking the military to use its space surveillance network to try to find the satellite. Once found, NASA could point their commanding antennas to the proper location and reacquire the satellite to ensure successful mission continuation. Communication from Space Command to its subordinate units requested support from any sensors in the network that could potentially track the probe.

Though the TOS system was not considered "operational" yet, the telescope and its operating system were sufficiently matured to track space objects and provide Element Set data to the space surveillance network if requested. The system had a unique function of allowing its operators to develop custom search patterns with the telescope. As Galileo was "lost", and current positional data was unavailable, a special search would be necessary to see if the probe could be found. One of the detachments members volunteered to attempt to find the satellite via one of these custom searches. The search pattern successfully acquired the satellite, and TOS was the first space surveillance system to provide the positional data to Space Command for relay to NASA, who reacquired the probe.

== 1994 - Mission withdrawn ==
In 1994, the base's mission was withdrawn, however, it reopened later that decade to support NATO operations in the Bosnian War followed shortly thereafter by operations in the Kosovo War. In 2000, the facility was once again closed. The landmark FLR-9 antenna array was disassembled. In 2003, the base reverted to Italian government ownership. The remaining parts of the base (around 80%) were left unoccupied and abandoned. A proposal for reuse by the University of Salento for its university campus has not been executed.

Since then, the Italian government donated parts of the base to the United Nations World Food Programme (WFP) which, since 2000, managed the United Nations Humanitarian Response Depot (UNHRD) in the military section of Brindisi Airport. In December 2006, UNHRD began using the facility as a simulation-based training center for its logistics officers, as well as logistics personnel of other humanitarian organizations. As of 2013, UNHRD also expanded its warehouses and premises in this facility in addition to its original assets in Brindisi Military Airport.

The 6917th Electronic Security Group and 7275 Air Base Group were stationed on San Vito. The US Navy also played a large part in the interception and decoding of intelligence and High Frequency Directional Finding. The base also hosted a small U.S. Army 9-man radio direction finding detachment reporting to the 600th USASA Company in Vicenza, Italy.

== See also ==
- United States Air Forces in Europe
- List of US military bases in Italy
