= AN/FLR-9 =

United States circularly disposed HF antenna array

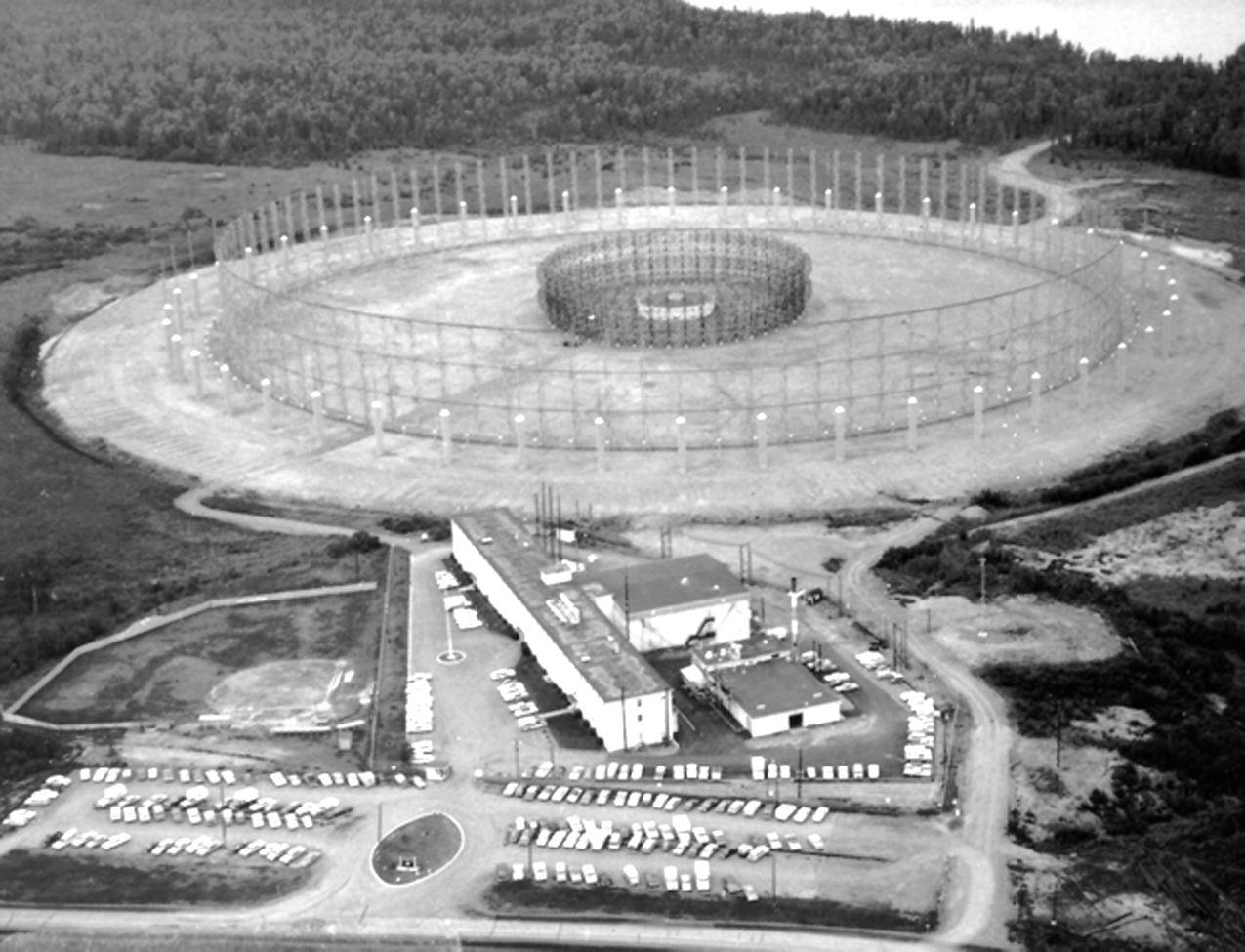
AN/FLR-9 in Elmendorf, Alaska c. 1964

The AN/FLR-9 is a type of very large circularly disposed antenna array, built at eight locations during the Cold War for HF/DF direction finding of high priority targets. The worldwide network, known collectively as "Iron Horse", could locate HF communications almost anywhere on Earth. Because of the exceptionally large size of its outer reflecting screen (1056 vertical steel wires supported by 96 120-foot (37 m) towers), the FLR-9 was commonly referred to by the nickname "Elephant Cage." Constructed in the early to mid 1960s, in May 2016 the last operational FLR-9 at Joint Base Elmendorf-Richardson in Alaska was decommissioned. It can be confused with the US Navy's AN/FRD-10, which also used a circularly disposed antenna array.

== Description ==
In accordance with the Joint Electronics Type Designation System (JETDS), the "AN/FLR-9" designation represents the 9th design of an Army-Navy electronic device for fixed ground countermeasures passive detection equipment. The JETDS system also now is used to name all Department of Defense electronic systems.

The AN/FLR-9 Operation and Service Manual describes the array as follows:

The antenna array is composed of three concentric rings of antenna elements. Each ring of elements receives RF signals for an assigned portion of the 1.5 to 30-MHz radio spectrum. The outer ring normally covers the 2 to 6-MHz range (band A), but also provides reduced coverage down to 1.5 MHz. The center ring covers the 6 to 18-MHz range (band B) and the inner ring covers the 18 to 30-MHz range (band C). Band A contains 48 sleeve monopole elements spaced 78.4 feet (23.9 m) apart (7.5 degrees). Band B contains 96 sleeve monopole elements spaced 37.5 feet (11.43 m) apart (3.75 degrees). Band C contains 48 antenna elements mounted on wooden structures placed in a circle around the central building. Bands A and B elements are vertically polarized. Band C elements consist of two horizontally polarized dipole antenna subelements electrically tied together, and positioned one above the other.

The array is centered on a ground screen 1,443 ft (440 m) in diameter. The arrangement permits accurate direction finding of signals from up to 4,000 nmi (7,400 km) away.

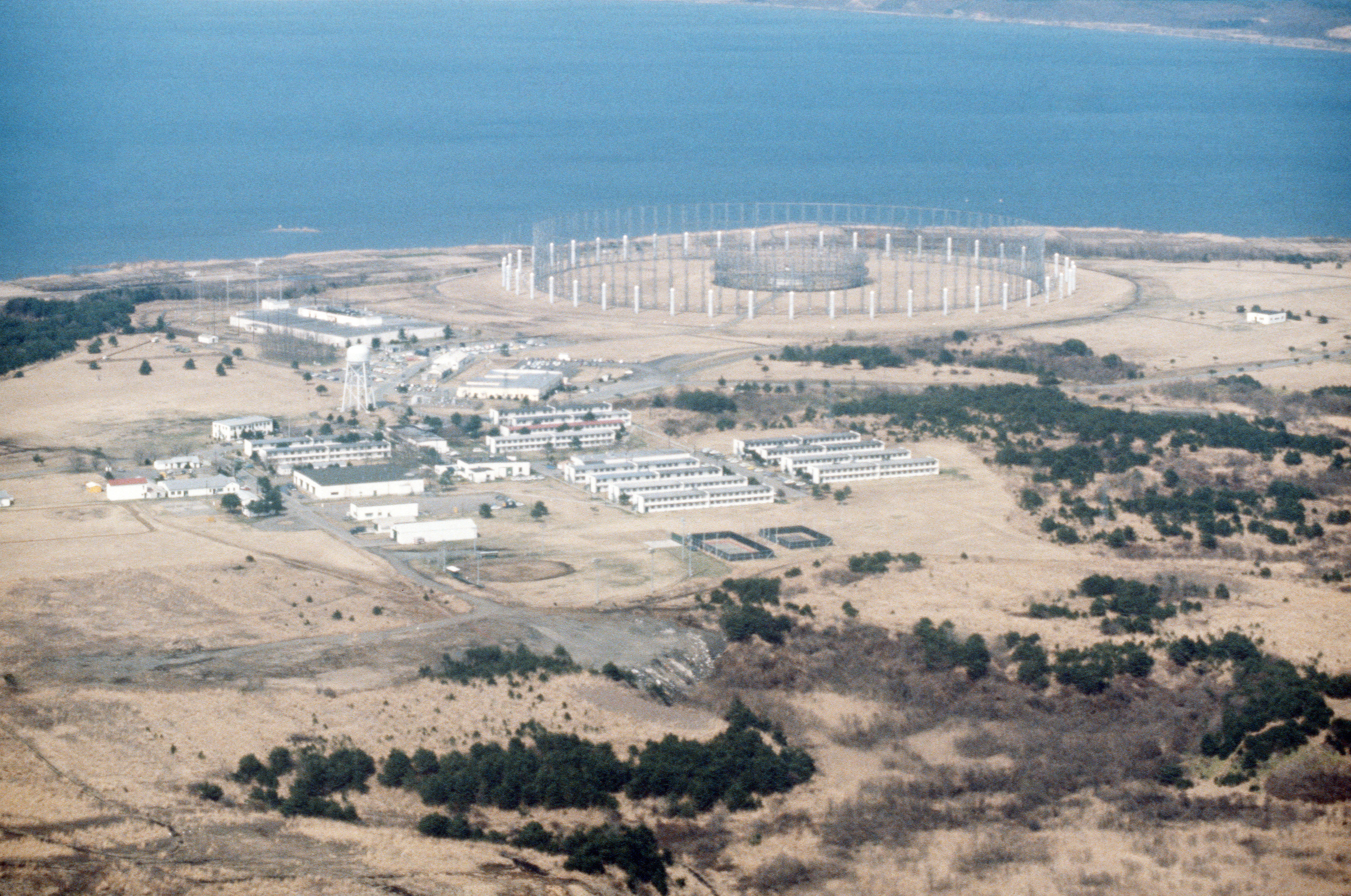
AN/FLR-9 antenna array at Misawa Air Base c. 1980

FLR-9s were constructed at the following places:

- USASA Field Station Augsburg (Gablingen Kaserne), Germany – 48.449278°N 10.863161°E
- RAF Chicksands, England – 52.042580°N 0.388298°W
- Clark AB, Philippines – 15.204687°N 120.528173°E
- Joint Base Elmendorf-Richardson, Alaska, USA (formerly designated as Elmendorf AFB) – 61.264486°N 149.851198°W
- Karamursel, Turkey – 40.709453°N 29.528074°E
- Misawa AB, Japan, built 1963 to 1965, demolished beginning in 2014.
- 7th Radio Research Field Station/Ramasun Station, Udon Thani Province, Thailand – 17.2917333°N 102.868850°E
- San Vito dei Normanni Air Station, Italy (near Brindisi) – 40.645638°N 17.841368°E

Advances in technology have made the FLR-9 obsolete. In 1997, the FLR-9 at the former Clark AB was converted into a 35,000-seat fabric-covered amphitheater. In early May 2002, systematic dismantling of the FLR-9 at San Vito began, and it was totally deconstructed by the end of that month. Although the markings of where the array stood remain in the ground, the structure is completely gone.

Demolition of the FLR-9 at Misawa began in October 2014.

A decommissioning ceremony for the last active FLR-9, at Joint Base Elmendorf-Richardson, was held on May 25, 2016.

== See also ==
- Signals intelligence
- High-frequency direction finding
- List of military electronics of the United States
