= CFS Masset =

CFS Masset Station des forces canadiennes Masset (SFC Masset)
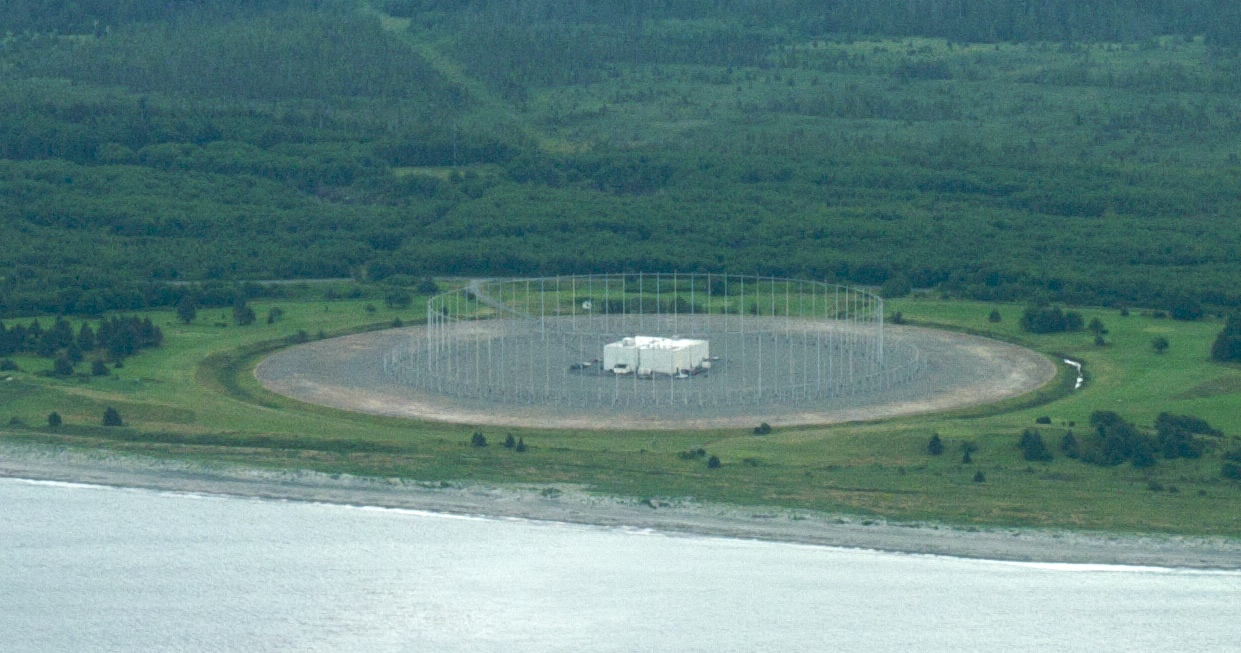
- Motto: Sine Dubio Sine Mora (Without Doubt or Delay)
- Location within Canada
- Coordinates: 54°01′44″N 132°03′55″W
- Country: Canada
- Province: British Columbia
- Established as Naval Radio Station: 1943
- Established as Canadian Forces Station: 1968
- Stood down: 1 April 1997
- Time zone: UTC-8 (Pacific Standard Time)
  - Summer (DST): UTC-7 (Pacific Daylight Time)

Canadian Forces Station Masset (French: Station des forces canadiennes Masset) was a Canadian Forces station and signals intercept facility located near Masset, British Columbia. The station was officially stood-down on 1 April 1997 and re-established as Canadian Forces Station Leitrim Detachment Masset.

== History ==
=== Naval Radio Station Masset (1943–1968) ===
The station was constructed in 1942 as Naval Radio Station (NRS) Masset and became active on 23 February 1943.

NRS Masset was used as a high-frequency direction finding (HF/DF) intercept station and a relay station for ship-to-shore communications. At the end of World War II NRS Masset was placed into caretaker status until reactivation in 1949, however an earthquake damaged the station and operations were suspended until 1951 when Masset became part of the military's SUPRAD (supplementary radio) system.

=== Canadian Forces Station Masset (1968–1997) ===
The station was re-designated as Canadian Forces Station Masset following the unification of the Canadian Forces in 1968.

In 1971, a Wullenweber AN/FRD-10 antenna was built as part of a larger shore-based HF/DF system to locate and classify enemy ships (known as Project Clarinet Bullseye). The FRD-10 at CFS Masset remained in use after the end of Clarinet Bullseye.

=== CFS Leitrim Detachment Masset (1997–) ===
CFS Masset was stood down and made a detachment of CFS Leitrim in 1997. Equipment at the facility is operated remotely from Leitrim to gather signals intelligence for the Canadian Forces Intelligence Branch and the Communications Security Establishment.
