= CFS Leitrim =

Canadian Forces Station in Ottawa, Ontario

Coordinates: 45.336495°N 75.587504°W

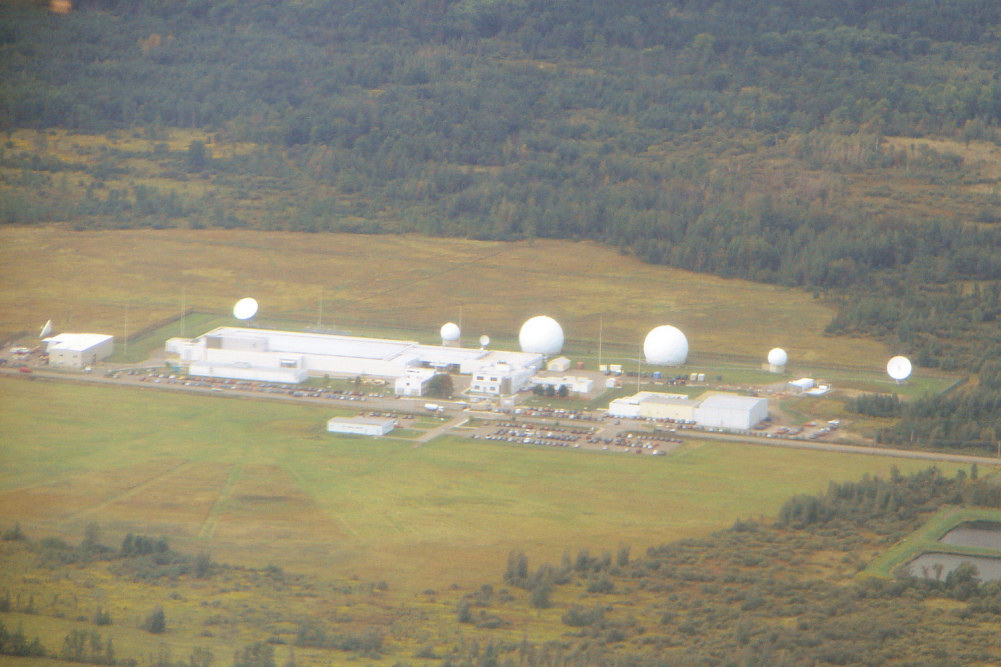
Aerial view of CFS Leitrim

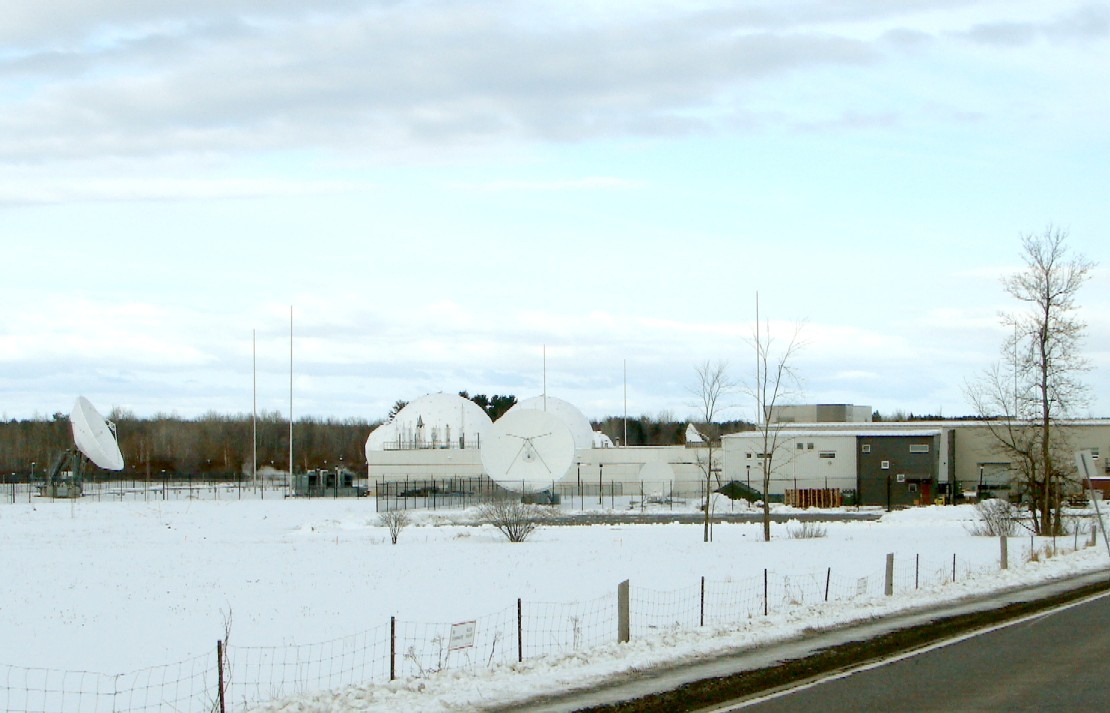
CFS Leitrim in winter

Canadian Forces Station Leitrim, also referred to as CFS Leitrim (/ˈliːtrəm/ LEE-trəm), is a Canadian Forces Station located in the neighbourhood of Leitrim in Ottawa, Ontario. It is concerned with the interception, decrypting and processing of communication for the Communications Security Establishment and the Canadian Forces, and forms part of the ECHELON system.

The station's motto Pacem Petere means Research For Peace.

== History ==
CFS Leitrim, located south of Ottawa, is Canada's oldest operational signal intelligence collection station. Established by the Royal Canadian Corps of Signals in 1941 as I Special Wireless Station and renamed Ottawa Wireless Station in 1949, CFS Leitrim acquired its current name when the Supplementary Radio System was created in 1966. In 1946, the station's complement was 75 personnel. The current strength is 975 military personnel and 50+ civilian employees.

To enhance security, Leitrim road, which passed directly in front of the station, was diverted roughly 300m to the south of the station in 2013.

== See also ==
- CFS Alert, Nunavut
- CFB Gander, Newfoundland and Labrador - Wullenweber AN/FRD-10 circularly disposed antenna array for High-frequency direction finding
- CFS Leitrim Detachment Masset, British Columbia (formerly CFS Masset)
- List of cyber warfare forces
