= Galeta Island (Panama) =

Island in Panama

Coordinates: 9°24.14′N 79°52.33′W

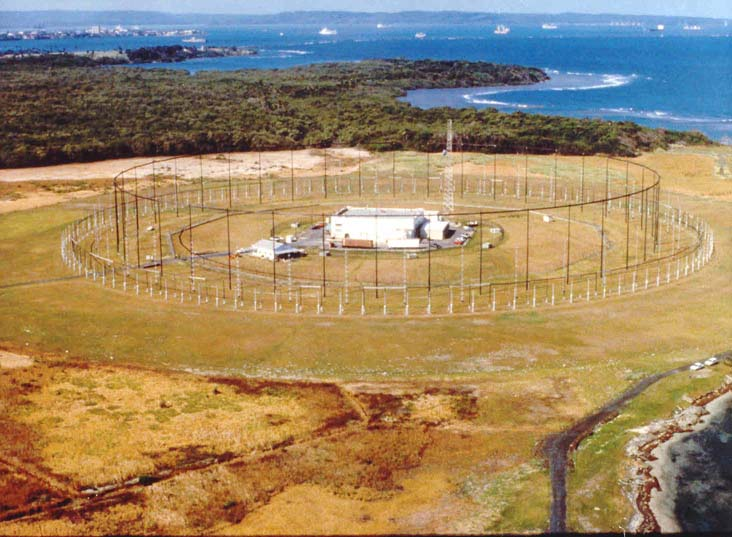
NSGA Galeta Island in 1991

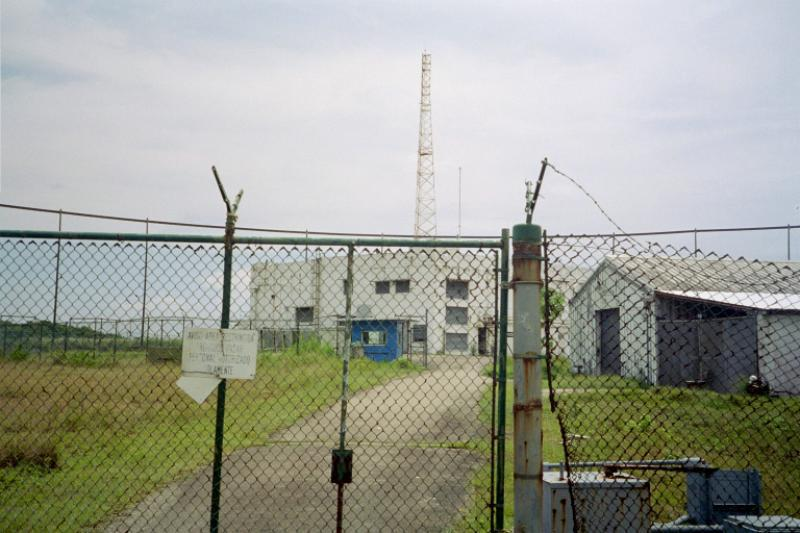
NSGA Galeta seen in July 2005

Galeta Island is an island located on the Atlantic side of the Republic of Panama, just east of the city of Colón, Panama.

Galeta Island was the site of a U.S. military communications facility from the 1930s through 2002, when it was turned over to the government of Panama. The facility included an operations building located in the center of a U.S. Navy AN/FRD-10A(V) antenna array, which is a Circularly Disposed Antenna Array (CDAA) also known as a Wullenweber array.

The island was shared with the Smithsonian Tropical Research Institute (STRI), which still maintains a research facility on the island. U.S. military activity ceased on the island after 2002, while tropical research continues in a separate facility located just east of the former communications facility.

== See also ==
- List of former United States military installations in Panama
