= 19th Coast Artillery (United States) =

19th Coast Artillery Regiment
- Active: 1940 - 1944
- Country: United States
- Branch: Army
- Type: Coast artillery
- Role: Harbor defense
- Size: Regiment
- Part of: Harbor Defenses of San Diego
- Garrison/HQ: Fort Rosecrans
- Mascot(s): Oozlefinch

The 19th Coast Artillery Regiment was a Coast Artillery regiment in the United States Army. It was the garrison of the Harbor Defenses of San Diego, replacing the 3rd Coast Artillery there. The regiment was active from 1940 until broken up into battalions and partially inactivated in October 1944 as part of an Army-wide reorganization.

== Lineage 1 ==
Constituted 20 October 1918 as the 19th Artillery (Coast Artillery Corps) (C.A.C.) and organized 29 October 1918 at Fort MacArthur, California, but demobilized 25 December 1918. The 4th, 10th, 11th, 13th, 14th, 18th, and 19th Companies of the Coast Defenses of Los Angeles were reassigned to create the regiment. This was one of a number of Coast Artillery regiments mobilized to operate heavy and railway artillery on the Western Front in World War I, but the Armistice resulted in the dissolution of the 19th.

== Lineage 2 ==
Constituted in the Organized Reserve 31 January 1935 as the 625th Coast Artillery (Harbor Defense) (HD), allotted to the Regular Army as an inactive unit 15 August 1935. Redesignated as the 19th CA (HD) 19 January 1940, regimental HHB and Battery A activated 1 February 1940 at Fort Rosecrans, replacing Battery D, 3rd Coast Artillery.

- Batteries B and E activated 1 July and 14 July 1940 at Fort Rosecrans.
- 1st Battalion HHB and Battery C activated 3 January 1941; 2nd Battalion HHB and Battery D activated same date; 3rd Bn HHB and Batteries H and I 1 June 1941. Btrys G and F activated 1 July and 14 July 1941.
- Battery F inactivated 1 October 1942.
- Authorized strength increased to four battalions, but only Battery N (searchlight) activated 1 June 1942, disbanded 29 August 1944.
- The 19th CA operated HD San Diego until broken up and partially inactivated 12 September 1944. Battery K redesignated Battery A, HD Los Angeles, 1st Battalion and Batteries A and B redesignated as 19th CA (HD) Battalion, 2nd Battalion and Batteries C and D redesignated as 523rd CA (HD) battalion. 3rd Battalion and Batteries E, G, H, and I transferred to Camp Barkeley, Texas and inactivated. Regiment disbanded 18 October 1944.
- 19th and 523rd CA Battalions disbanded 15 September 1945 at Fort Rosecrans and Fort Emory.

== See also ==
- Distinctive unit insignia (U.S. Army)
- Seacoast defense in the United States
- United States Army Coast Artillery Corps
- Harbor Defense Command
