= Bramstedtlund =

- Municipality
- Coat of arms

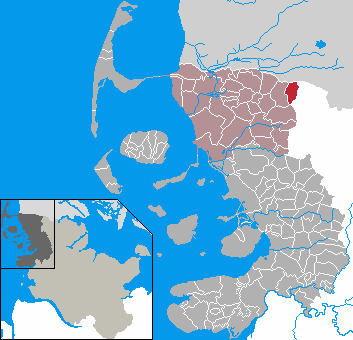
- Location of Bramstedtlund within Nordfriesland district
- Interactive map of Bramstedtlund
- Location within Germany Location within Schleswig-Holstein
- Coordinates: 54°51′N 09°04′E
- Country: Germany
- State: Schleswig-Holstein
- District: Nordfriesland
- Municipal assoc.: Südtondern

Government
  - Mayor: Joachim Puschmann

Area
  - Total: 13.85 km^{2} (5.35 sq mi)
- Elevation: 14 m (46 ft)

Population (2025-12-31)
  - Total: 225
  - Density: 16.2/km^{2} (42.1/sq mi)
- Time zone: UTC+01:00 (CET)
  - Summer (DST): UTC+02:00 (CEST)
- Postal codes: 25926
- Dialling codes: 04666
- Vehicle registration: NF
- Website: www.amt-suedtondern.de

Bramstedtlund is a municipality in the district of Nordfriesland, in Schleswig-Holstein, Germany.

== SIGINT ==
A Bundeswehr telecommunications intelligence unit has been stationed in the town since the 1960s.

An HF direction finding system with the code name Castagnete is on the northern border of Germany.

The Bramstedtlund radio transmitting/receiving station (FuS/ESt Bramstedtlund) covers an area from Norway to the Black Sea. The outer diameter of the circular Wullenwever antenna is 450 meters. The facility was built by DASA and recording operations began in the “Kastagnette” Bramstedtlund on March 15, 1995.

The unit reports to the Strategic Reconnaissance Command (KSA) and shares data with the BND. From 2022, the interception unit and the parent unit in Stadum (Südtondern barracks) will be involved in the electronic investigation of war events in Ukraine.
