= Chernyakhovsk CDAA =

Russian circularly disposed antenna array in Kaliningrad enclave

- Kaliningrad Oblast; Near Chernyakhovsk in Russia
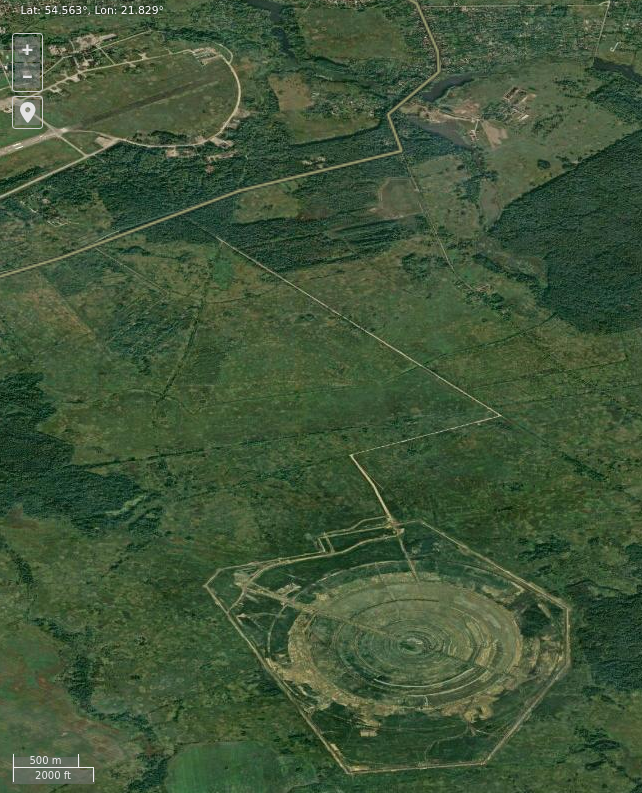
- Satellite imagery of the Chernyakhovsk CDAA southeast of Chernyakhovsk airbase (visible top left)

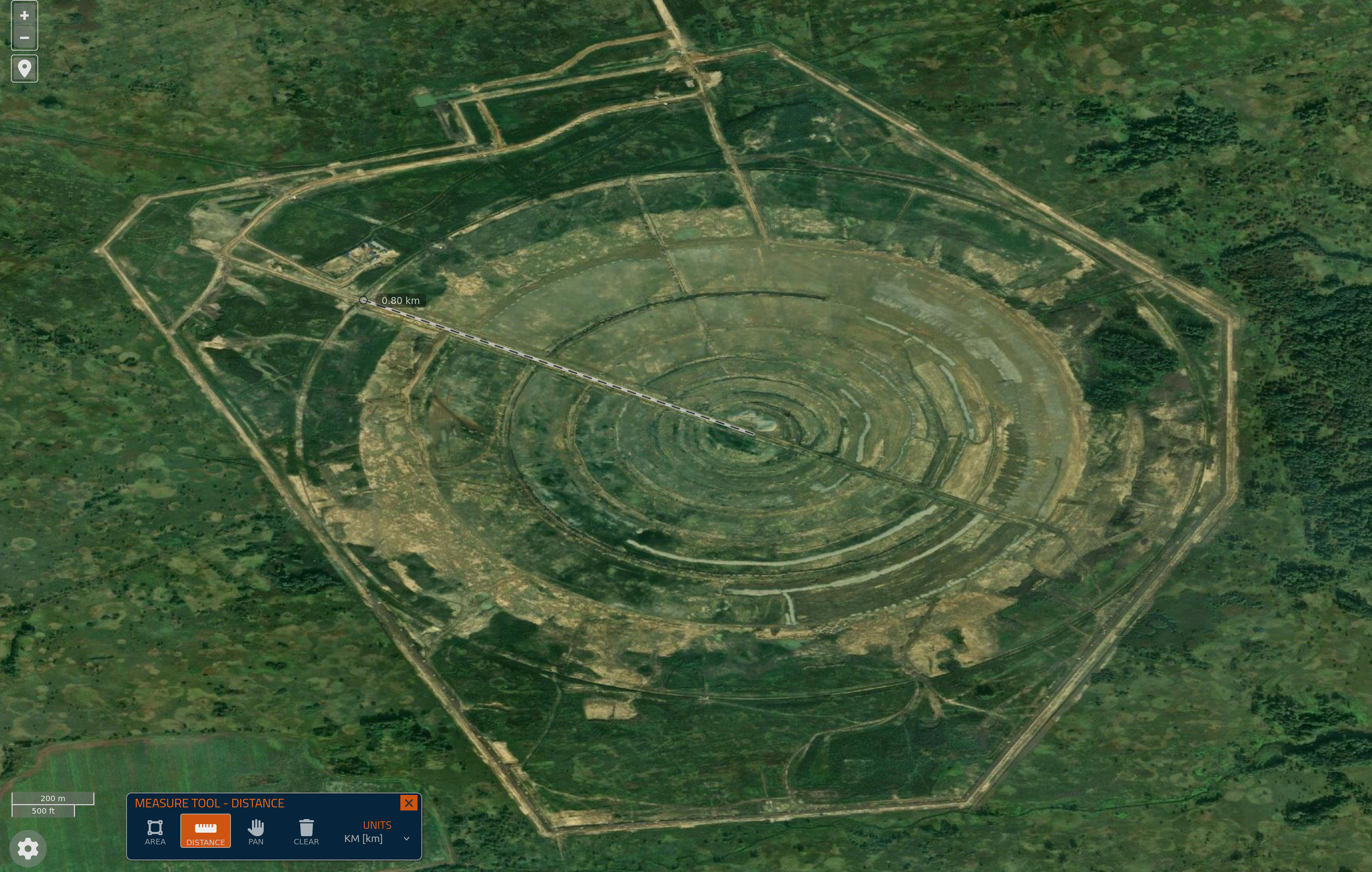
- Satellite imagery showing the outer ring radius to be 0.8 km

Location
- Location of Chernyakhovsk CDAA within Kaliningrad Oblast Location of Kaliningrad within Russia Location of Kaliningrad within Europe Chernyakhovsk CDAA (European Russia) Chernyakhovsk CDAA (Russia)
- Coordinates: 54.563°N 21.829°E

The Chernyakhovsk CDAA (Russian: Черняхо́вск круг) is a close-to-completed, 1,600 m wide circularly disposed antenna array (CDAA) located circa 5 km southeast of Chernyakhovsk air base in the Kaliningrad enclave.

== Location ==
The site is located approximately 25 kilometers from the eastern border of Poland, in a remote forested area. A time-series of Sentinel-2 satellite imagery shows how work at the site started in March 2023 with clearing of forest and construction of a road to the site. Work has progressed until in July 2025 the facility has six concentric antenna rings, a security perimeter fence with checkpoint and radial roads through the rings. Excavation points along the rings are interpreted as positions for vertical monopole antennas.

With its location in the westernmost part of Russia it is well situated for monitoring and intercepting NATO communications.

== System ==
The system which is using the CDAA is primarily designed for strategic radio reconnaissance in the HF (shortwave) range. It enables the interception and monitoring of military and civilian radio signals and data streams deep within NATO territory, including Poland, the Baltic states, and Germany as well as the precise localization of their sources.

== See also ==
- Signals intelligence – Intelligence-gathering by interception of signals
- List of Russian military bases
