= Silver Strand Training Complex =

Military training facility in California, United States

- Navy Radio Compass Station; Navy Direction Finder Station; Fort Emory; Imperial Beach Radio Station; Naval Radio Receiving Station Imperial Beach; Naval Radio Receiving Facility
- Part of Naval Base Coronado
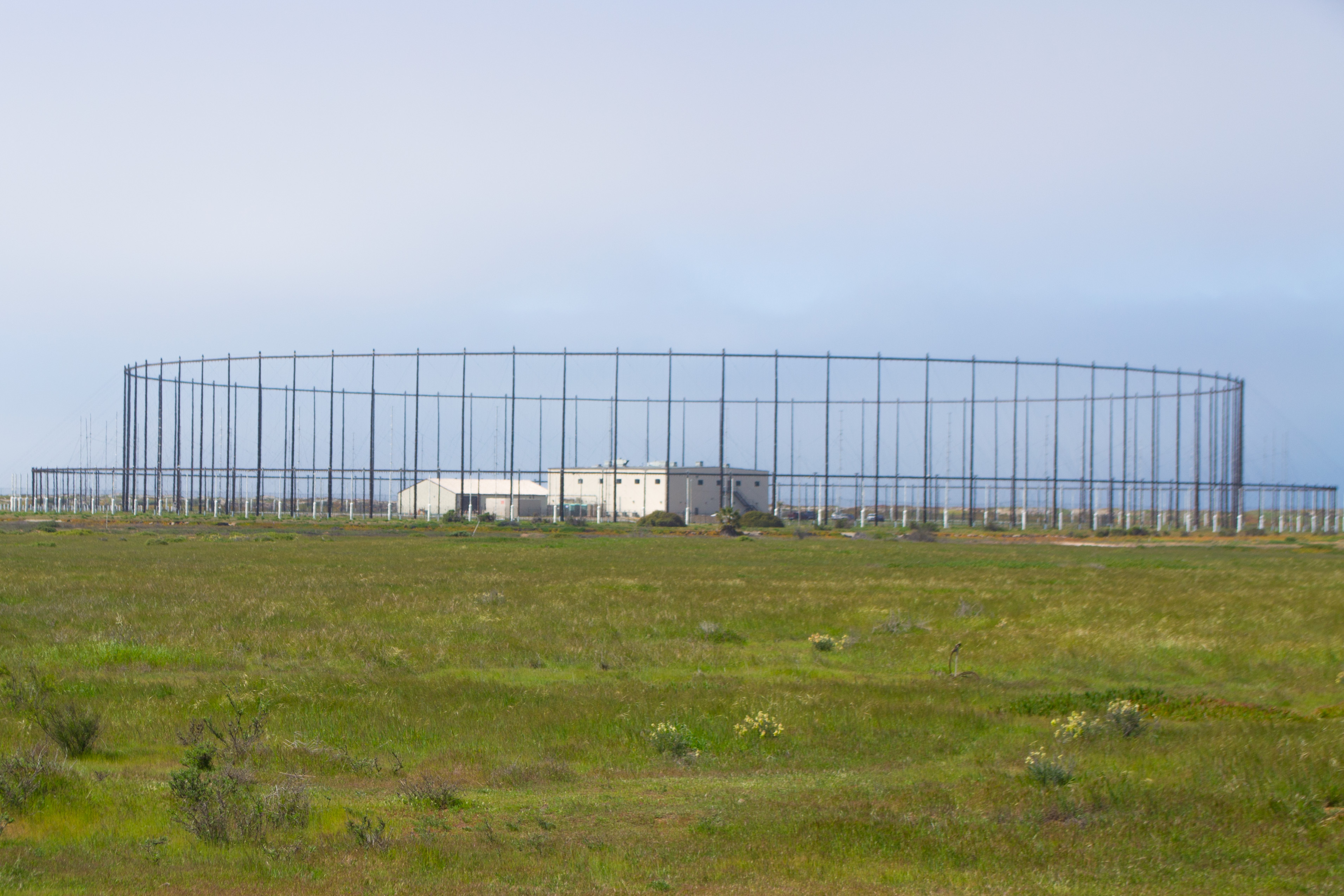
- Silver Strand Training Complex antenna array in 2013

Site information
- Owner: United States Navy
- Controlled by: U.S. Special Operations Forces

Location
- Location within the United States
- Coordinates: 32.596389°N 117.128056°W

Site history
- Built: 1920

Garrison information
- Occupants: United States Naval Special Warfare Command

Silver Strand Training Complex (SSTC) is a training facility for U.S. special operations forces. Located between Imperial Beach, California, and Silver Strand State Beach near San Diego. The area is part of Naval Base Coronado and commanded by that base's Commanding Officer. While just north of Imperial Beach, it is within the city limits of Coronado. The facility was known by locals as the "elephant cage" which is a nickname for the large wullenweber direction finder antenna. The antenna was used to provide direction finding, primary communication links for U.S. Navy submarines. The antenna was finally dismantled in 2015, even though it was scheduled to be removed in fiscal year 2007.

== History ==
=== Naval ===
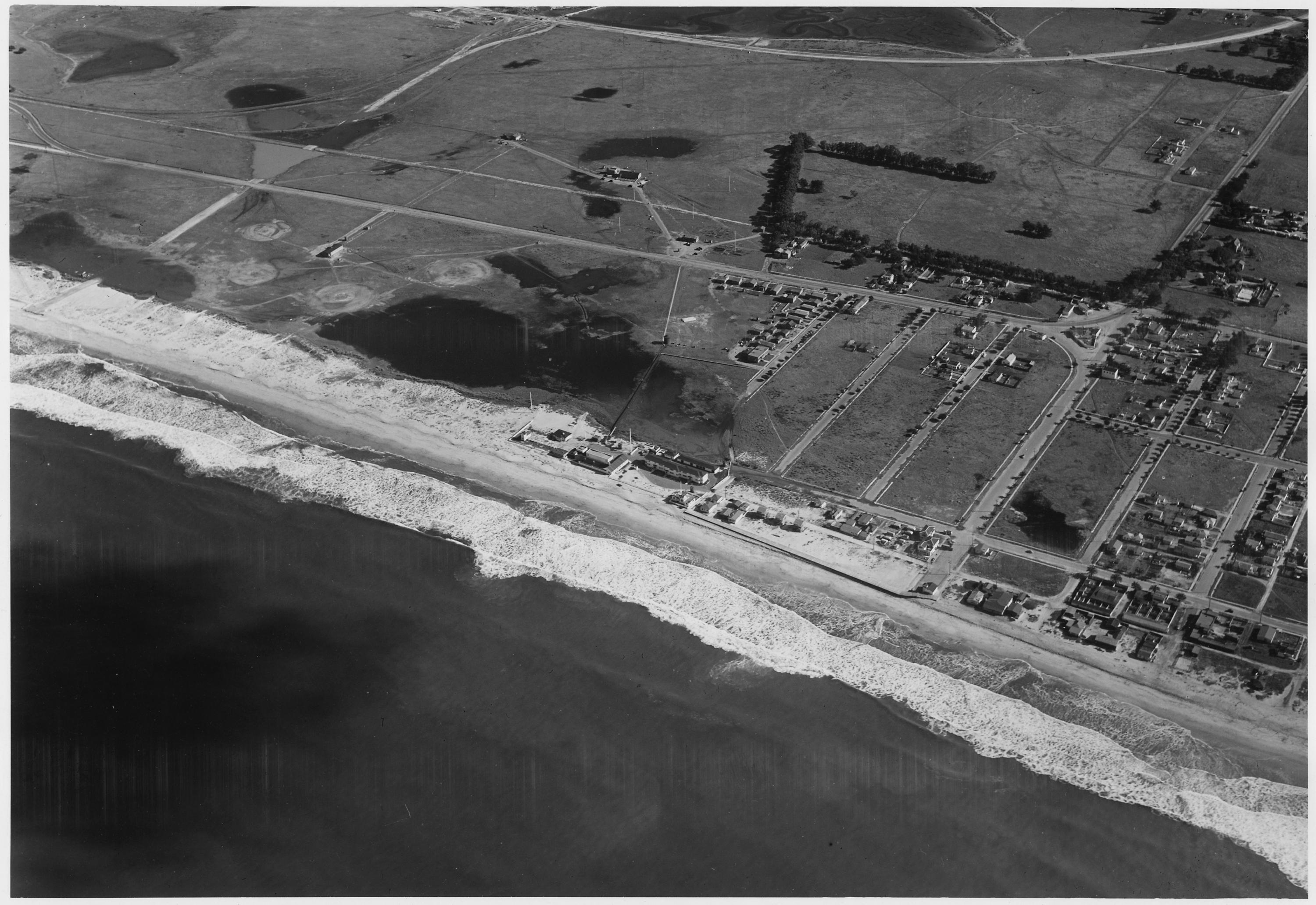
Navy Radio Compass Station, circa 1925

Initially created in 1920 as the Navy Radio Compass Station, it was renamed in 1940 as the Navy Direction Finder Station when a permanent direction finding station was established. In 1943, thirty WAVES were stationed there, culminating in 1945 with a total of 112 WAVES; there they engaged in SIGINT. By 1953, it was known as Naval Radio Receiving Station Imperial Beach, and in 1965 it received its well-known Wullenweber Circular Disposed Antenna Array, an AN/FRD-10. In 1971, it was renamed as the Naval Radio Receiving Facility, and later Naval Security Group Detachment Imperial Beach. The last of its type to be built, it ceased operation in 1999.

=== Army ===
In 1942, the United States Army took ownership of 412.14 acres in Coronado Heights and designated it Fort Emory in honor of Brigadier-General William H. Emory, itself being subordinate to Fort Rosecrans, being manned by the 19th Coast Artillery. Armament of the base consisted of four 155 mm guns of Battery Imperial, which were later superseded by the two 6-inch M1905 guns of Battery Grant. Coastal radars were authorized in 1943. Construction of a two-gun 16-inch battery (#134) was completed in 1944; however, the guns were never mounted; these guns would have supplemented the 16-inch Battery Ashburn at Fort Rosecrans. In World War II, Fort Emory was garrisoned by the 19th Coast Artillery Regiment, and after October 1944 by the 523rd Coast Artillery Battalion. The land upon which the fort was located was turned over to the Navy in 1947, with a single army family as caretaker of the facilities, which were declared surplus a year later; in 1950 it was finally transferred to the Navy, integrating with the Imperial Beach Radio Station.

== Operations ==
Today the 578 acres (2 km^{2}) facility allegedly provides a helpful training environment with waterborne approaches from both the Pacific Ocean and San Diego Bay sides. Offshore the Coronado Roads area is used for ship systems testing. The city-like layout of the base also provides a realistic site for critical urban warfare training.

For amphibious operations training the beaches of the base have been designated Beach White, and Beach Purple, each with two training lanes. In 2010, the Navy proposed increased training, including mine-sweeping training, amphibious operations, as well as special warfare operations. This faced opposition during public hearings by environmentalist, due to possible impact upon the California least tern, San Diego fairy shrimp, and to a lesser extent the Western snowy plover. Later that year new warning signs were put up by the Navy warning of increased training, and of endangered species. A ten-year-long, 818-page environmental impact statement was released relating to this proposed increased activity, it was created with the assistance of the United States Fish and Wildlife Service. Sailors and Marines, training on the Complex are provided maps to avoid environmentally sensitive areas, and conduct clean-ups to minimize impact on those areas supervised by local organizations and the EPA. In an unrelated proposal, the base's water area will be used for training by the littoral combat ships for antisubmarine warfare; the Navy has filed its impact upon wildlife with NOAA as it relates to the Marine Mammal Protection Act.

In September 2014, the Navy proposed demolishing the Wullenweber Antenna Array stating it was obsolete equipment. By early 2015, the array had been demolished.

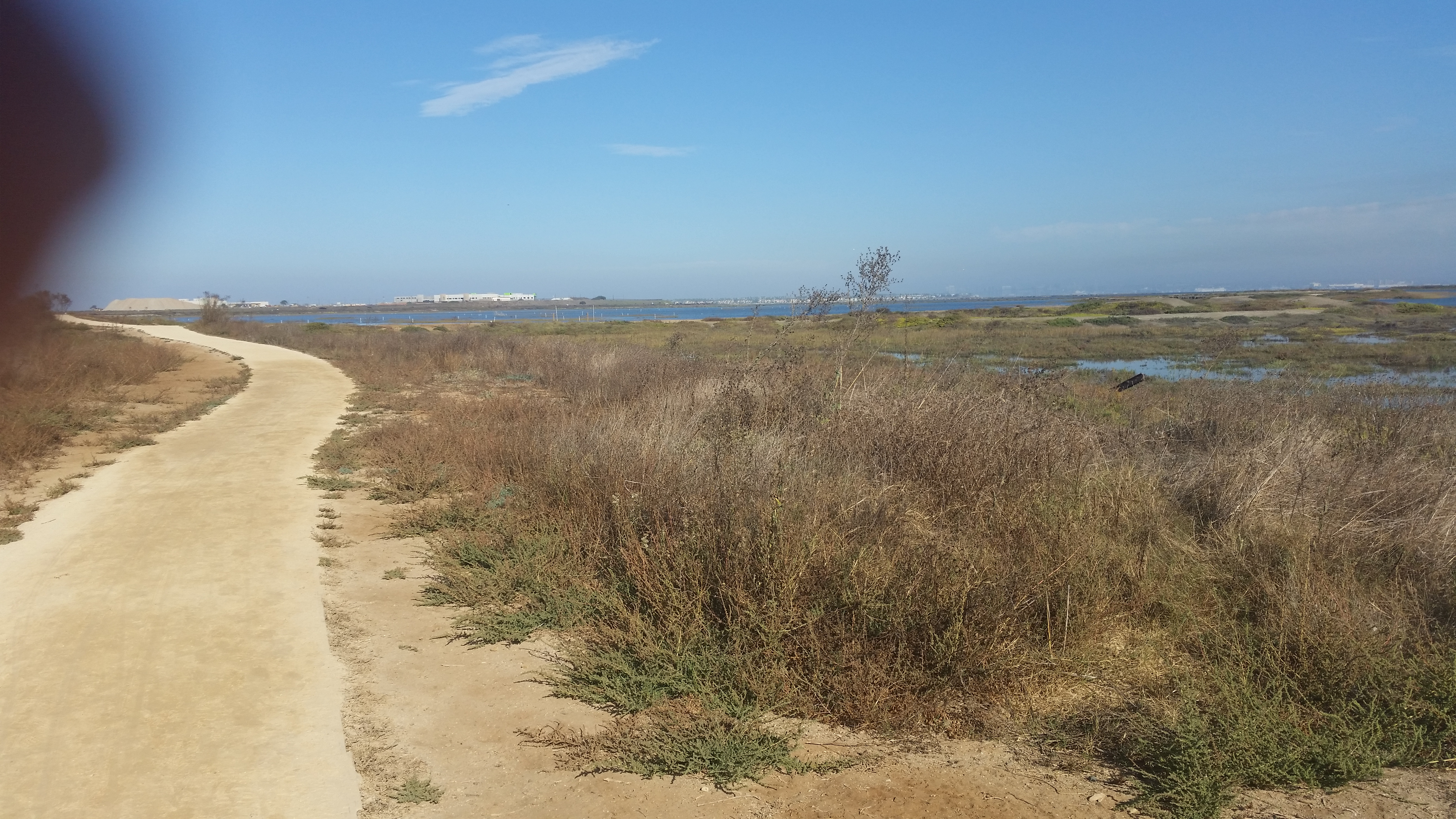
Construction of the coastal campus of Special Warfare Command seen from San Diego Bay National Wildlife Refuge, in October 2017.

In 2014, the Navy proposed expansion of Special Warfare Command facilities at Silver Strand, dubbed "Naval Base Coronado Coastal Campus"; the proposal had four alternatives, one which would demolish a historic bunker. Concern has been raised of the effect of planned expansion on Acmispon prostratus (synonym Lotus nuttallianus). At its outset, the expansion in facilities aboard Silver Strand was over $700 million. As of February 2016, the Navy plans to tear down the bunker; it had been planned to be named for Brigadier General George Washington Gatchell, but is identified as #134. It had been previously used by the Navy as an instruction of SEALs, and had the designation of "Building 99"; it would have been eligible to be listed on the National Register of Historic Places. In August 2016, members of the Kumeyaay nation protested the construction due to concerns about disturbing buried ancestors. It was estimated that demolition of "Building 99" would be completed by December 2016. In April 2018, Representative Susan Davis raised concern of sewage spillage from the Tijuana River would have on SEAL training at the complex. In May 2018, construction continued with five new buildings of the 44 planned to be built, were completed with some already in use. Upon completion, it is expected that over 3,000 navy personnel will be working aboard the complex.

In 2015, the Naval Special Warfare Advanced Training Command opened a course on unmanned aerial system, including the Scan Eagle, aboard Silver Strand Training Complex, with additional field activities occurring at Camp Roberts.

In 2019, the entrance road to the base was renamed Old Fort Emory Boulevard by the commanding officer of Naval Base Coronado.
