= AN/FRD-10 =

US Navy circularly disposed HF/DF antenna array

- Circularly Disposed Antenna Array (CDAA)
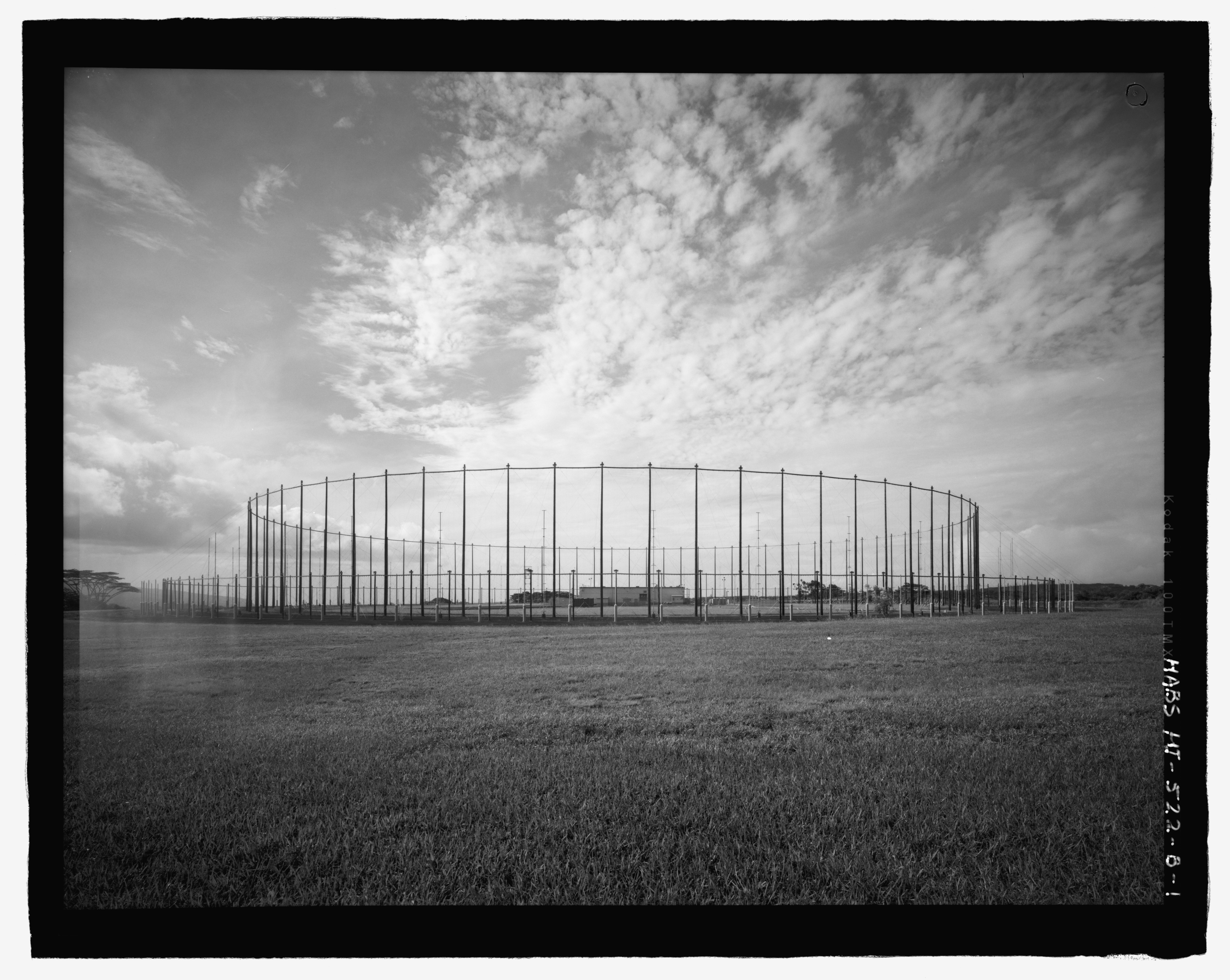
- AN/FRD-10, Wahiawa, Hawaii
- Country of origin: United States
- Introduced: 1961
- Type: Circularly disposed antenna array (CDAA)
- Frequency: Low Band 2-9 MHz; High Band 9-32 MHz
- Inner Array Antenna radius: 393.5 feet (119.9 m)
- Inner Array Reflector radius: 366 feet (112 m)
- Outer Array Antenna radius: 436.75 feet (133.12 m); 431.75 feet (131.60 m) at 4 sites
- Outer Array Reflector radius: 423.5 feet (129.1 m)
- Range: 3,200 nautical miles (5,900 km)
- Antenna Cost (1970): $800,000 to $900,000 ($7.46 million today)
- Electronics Cost (1970): $20 million ($166 million today)

The AN/FRD-10 is a United States Navy circularly disposed antenna array (CDAA), built at a number of locations during the Cold War for high frequency radio direction finding (HF/DF) and signals intelligence (SIGINT). 14 sites were originally constructed as a part of the "Classic Bullseye" program. Two AN/FRD-10 systems were later installed in Canada. AN/FRD-10 systems were originally constructed in the early 1960s, but after the dissolution of the Soviet Union, the systems began to be shut down and demolished. The now-disestablished Naval Security Group operated and maintained the U.S. Navy AN/FRD-10 systems. The system had several nicknames including Fred-10 and Elephant or Dinosaur cages. As of 2026, none of the U.S. Navy AN/FRD-10 sites are extant, but the two Canadian sites remain. The AN/FLR-9 was a system with a similar design and function, but operated by the U.S. Air Force and U.S. Army.

In accordance with the Joint Electronics Type Designation System (JETDS), the "AN/FRD-10" designation represents the 10th design of an Army-Navy electronic device for fixed radio detection finding system. The JETDS system also now is used to name all Department of Defense electronic systems.

== Bullseye ==
The program to install and operate the radio direction finding network was known as Bullseye, Clarinet Bullseye and Classic Bullseye at various points over its life cycle. The word Classic was likely added later when permanently assigned "first words" were created for two-word nicknames. Classic was the word used to designate programs related to the Naval Security Group and Clarinet was used for programs related to the Chief of Naval Operations.

Classic Bullseye was also related to the Centerboard and Flaghoist programs. Centerboard was a network for processing HF/DF information. The security classification guide that covered all three programs was cancelled in January 2009. Later, the programs Unitary DF and Crosshair sought to unify the military's HF direction finding information into a single data collection network. Crosshair, an HF/DF geolocation network, is apparently still in use c. 2015, employing small fixed or mobile HF/DF systems instead of large circular arrays.

== Development ==
The United States Naval Research Laboratory (NRL) led development of the technology that was used in the AN/FRD-10. Three developments were critical to the FRD-10, the ability to record portions of the frequency spectrum for future analysis, the Circularly Disposed Antenna Array (CDAA) and the computer control system that allowed rapid triangulation across multiple sites. NRL funded research at a test site built in 1955 by the University of Illinois at the Bondville Road Field Station in Scott Township, Champaign County, Illinois, south of Bondville, Illinois. The AN/FRD-10 antenna was a scaled-up version of the NRL prototype antenna array.

== Construction and cost ==
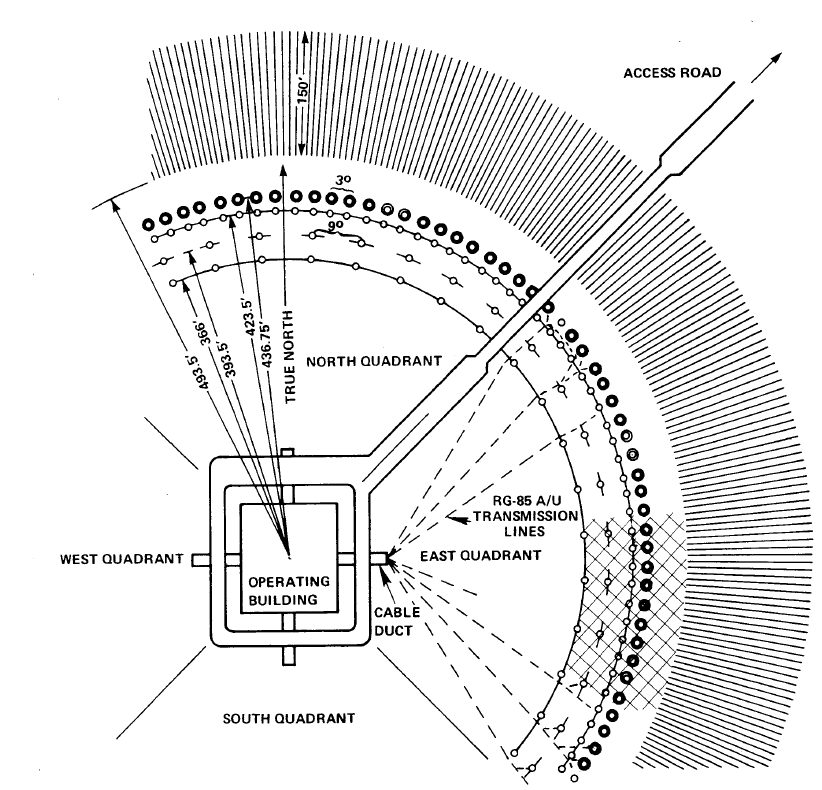
Plan view of a CDAA quadrant

In 1959, the Navy awarded a contract to ITT Federal Systems to construct a network of AN/FRD-10 systems. The first AN/FRD-10 to be constructed was at NSGA Hanza in Okinawa, but future FRD-10 sites had different antenna dimensions. The High band reflector was reduced from 120 ft to 90 ft in later sites. Additionally, the outer high band antenna ring at Hanza was 311 feet (95 m) from the center with later sites being around 435 feet (133 m). For the remaining sites, the outer antenna elements were spaced every 3 degrees around the circle and the outer reflector was 24.3 feet (7.4 m) tall. The inner antenna elements were spaced every 9 degrees and the inner reflector was 90 feet (27 m) tall. One site was short lived. NSGA Marietta, Washington closed in 1972 and reverted to a Lummi reservation. Marietta was the first FRD-10 site to shut down and operated less than 10 years.

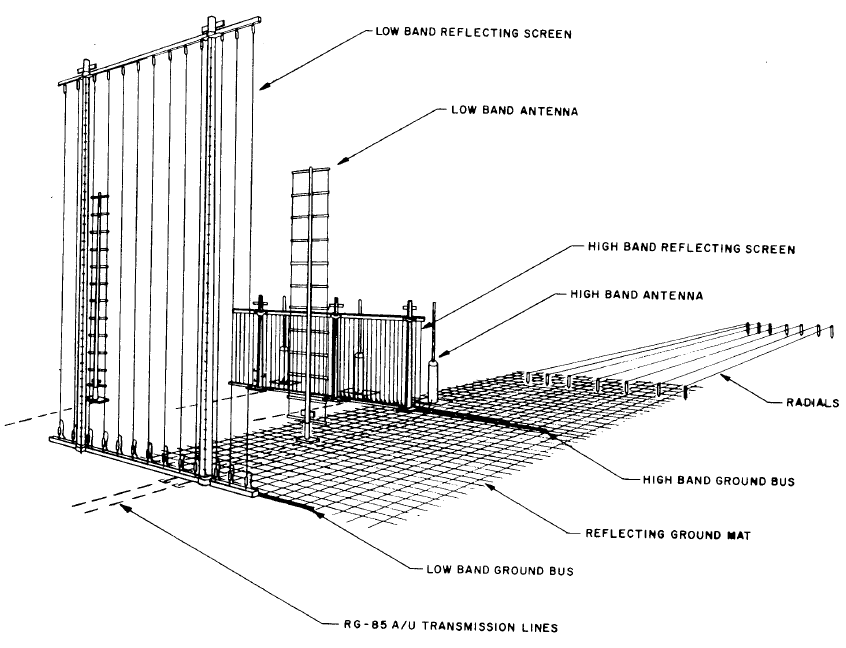
Major components of the antenna array.

The 1970 estimate to construct a CDAA was just under $900,000 ($7.46 million today) with electronics at the site estimated at $20 million ($166 million today). The system had 120 high band antennas and 40 low band antennas which had to be positioned within +/- two minutes of arc and +/- 3 inches of their intended distance from the center of the array. 160 75 ohm coaxial transmission lines were used to carry signals from the antennas had to be electrically matched to within 3/4 of a degree at 10 MHz. This task was estimated at 300 to 400 man hours to complete. There was also an extensive grounding system used at the FRD-10 sites. This included 360 ground radials made of 8 AWG wire, 150 feet (46 m) long, extending from the outer antenna ring. It also included a massive ground grid, made of 10 AWG wire bonded together to create a mesh with 2 feet (61 cm) squares. It was laid underground up to the radials in the area between the high and low antennas.

Weather proved to be a challenge for the FRD-10 antennas. For example, the antenna at NSGA Winter Harbor had problems due to frost heaving the ground and shifting the reflector screens out of alignment. Digging up the affected poles and replacing them was costly and was estimated at $240,000 in the late 1970s. An alternative method was discovered that modified the poles to allow readjustment of the screen instead of the costly removal and replacement that had been done in the past. The arrays were also vulnerable to high winds. Antenna arrays at Homestead, Florida and Sabana Seca, Puerto Rico were heavily damaged by Hurricanes Andrew and Georges, respectively.

== Capabilities ==
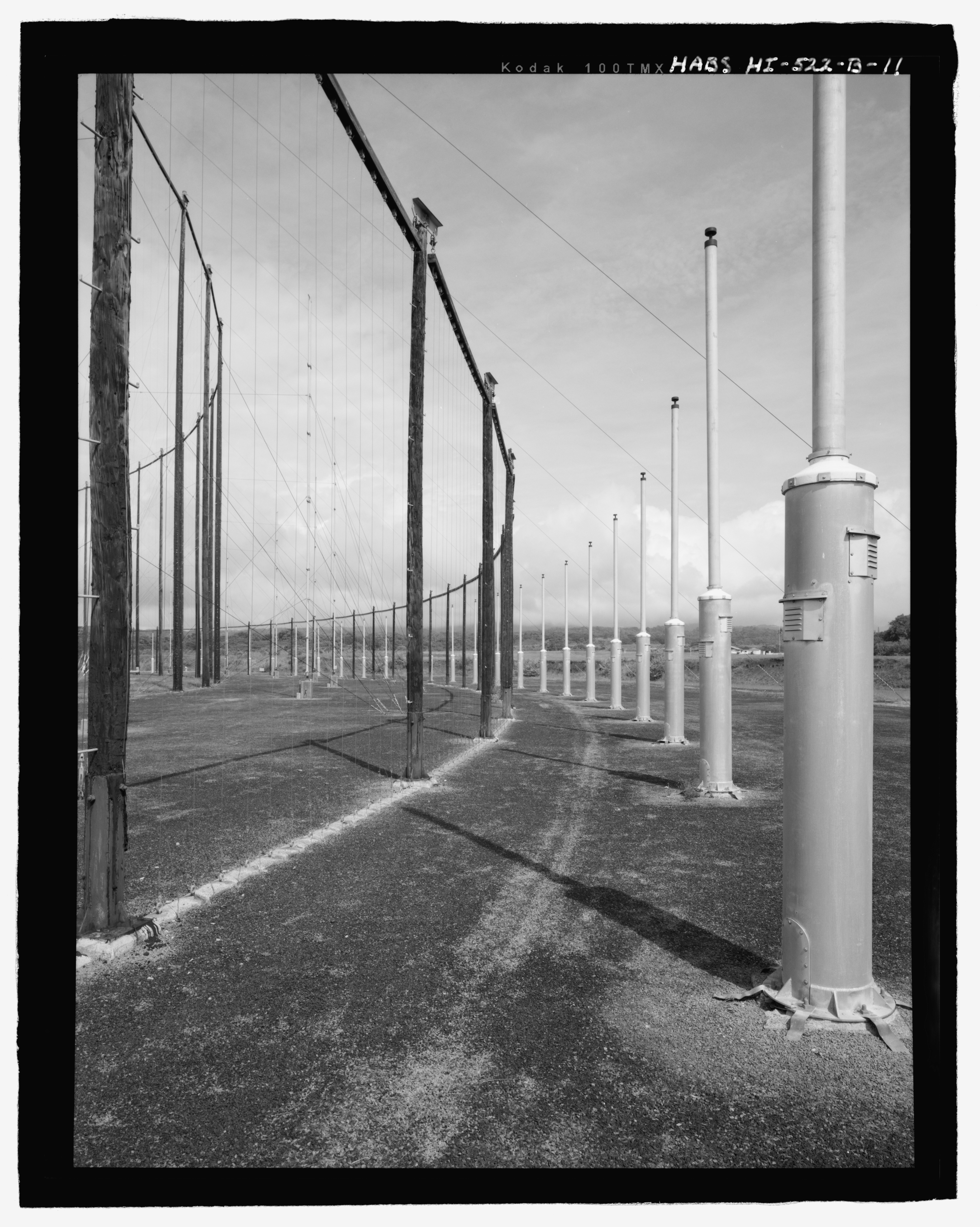
25 ft high-band reflector screens on the left, behind the high-band monopole antenna at right.

The AN/FRD-10 had an estimated range of 3,200 nautical miles (5,900 km) and was used to monitor and triangulate single or double hop high frequency (HF) signals between 2 and 32 MHz. Site locations were likely chosen based on HF hop distances for their intended surveillance targets. The FRD-10 was designed to locate HF transmissions especially from submarines and was managed by the Naval Security Group. The Navy also claimed over the years that the direction finding sites were used primarily for air and sea rescue operations and Naval communications in the case of the pair of FRD-10s at Sugar Grove Station.

The FRD-10 used a goniometer to rapidly scan through all the antennas around the circle. This electronically "rotated" the antenna 360 degrees several times a second allowing fast and accurate direction finding. This was needed because Soviet submarines began to use wide-band burst transmissions in the early 1960s to make themselves more difficult to pinpoint. Initially, these signals were too rapid for Bullseye's predecessor, Boresight, to locate, but the AN/FRD-10 was able to locate even very brief transmissions.

Sites in the Classic Bullseye network were connected by communications links to facilitate "near instantaneous" triangulation of received signals if two or more sites received the same signal. Signals could also be recorded for later direction finding. The system was four times more accurate than the prior Navy AN/GRD-6 system with bearing accuracy better than 0.5 degrees.

The Navy AN/FRD-10 was slightly smaller and had a narrower frequency range compared to the Air Force AN/FLR-9 system. The FRD-10 had only 2 antenna rings, 870 feet (270 m) and 780 feet (240 m) diameters. The Navy system was vertically instead of horizontally polarized. The FRD-10 was also said to be closer to omnidirectional than to the FLR-9 due to complications added by having three sets of reflectors and with FLR-9 array looking inward rather than outward. On the FRD-10 the high band elements were on the outside, vs inside.

Smaller AX-16 Pusher antenna arrays were developed with about half the diameter of the AN/FRD-10 and were used at sites that required a smaller footprint, like Diego Garcia and other sites in the United Kingdom. The pusher systems were found to have lower performance, but not primarily due to the reduced antenna size. Most of the excess signal loss and higher noise floor was attributed to problems with the RF distribution network and higher transmission line losses due to the RG-8 coaxial cable that the pusher systems used.

== Locations of FRD-10 sites ==
=== Atlantic ===
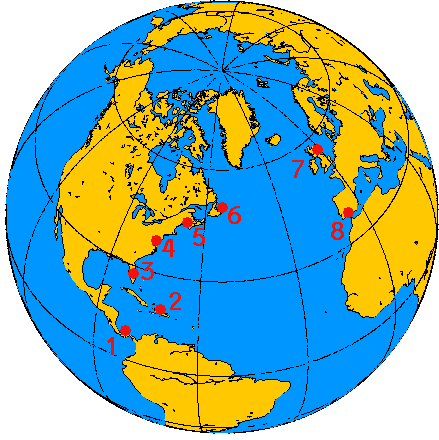
FRD-10 sites in the Atlantic

No.	Site Name	Location	Map link	Fate
1	NSGA Galeta Island	Galeta Island, Panama	9°24′09″N 79°52′20″W	Shut down 1995, abandoned in place.
2	NSGA Sabana Seca	Toa Baja, Puerto Rico	18°27′16″N 66°13′36″W	Damaged by Hurricane Georges in 1998, demolished 1999.
3	NSGA Homestead	Homestead, Florida	25°22′21″N 80°25′24″W	Damaged by Hurricane Andrew in 1992, later demolished.
4	NSGA Northwest	Chesapeake, Virginia	36°32′56″N 76°15′31″W	Shut down 2001, demolished.
5	NSGA Winter Harbor	Winter Harbor, Maine	44°24′04″N 67°59′28″W	Shut down 1998, demolished 2001.
6	CFB Gander	Gander, Newfoundland, Canada	48°57′03″N 54°31′29″W	Operational.
7	NSGA Edzell	RAF Edzell, Edzell, Scotland	56°48′33″N 2°36′20″W	Shut down 1997, demolished later.
8	NSGA Rota	NS Rota, Rota, Cádiz, Spain	36°39′24″N 6°21′54″W	Shut down 1993, demolished 2005.

=== Pacific ===
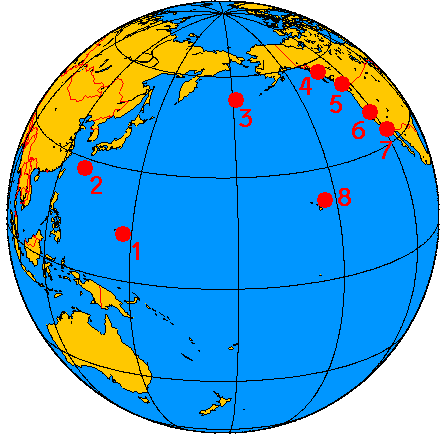
FRD-10 sites in the Pacific

No.	Site Name	Location	Map link	Fate
1	NCTS Guam (NCTS Finegayan)	Dededo, Guam	13°35′37″N 144°51′09″E	Shut down 1999, demolished 2000s.
2	NSGA Hanza	Okinawa	26°24′01″N 127°43′48″E	Shut down 1997, demolished 2007.
3	NSGA Adak	Adak, Alaska	51°56′33″N 176°36′02″W	Shut down 1994, later demolished.
4	CFS Masset	Masset, British Columbia, Canada	54°01′44″N 132°03′55″W	Operational as of 2026, operated remotely from CFS Leitrim, Ontario.
5	NSGA Marietta	Marietta-Alderwood, Washington	48°47′39″N 122°39′16″W	Closed 1972, first Bullseye site closed.
6	NSGA Skaggs Island	Sonoma County, California	38°10′08″N 122°22′23″W	Shut down 1993, later demolished.
7	NSGA Imperial Beach	Imperial Beach, California	32°35′36″N 117°07′45″W	Shut down 1999, demolished 2015.
8	NCTAMS Wahiawa	Wahiawa, Hawaii	21°31′20″N 158°00′41″W	Shut down 1998, demolished 2005.

=== Other ===
- NAVRADSTA Sugar Grove Station, Sugar Grove, West Virginia (38°30′54″N 79°16′46″W) (two adjacent variants of the AN/FRD-10), not operated by the NSG. Demolished prior to December 31, 2002, aerial imagery.

== Gallery ==
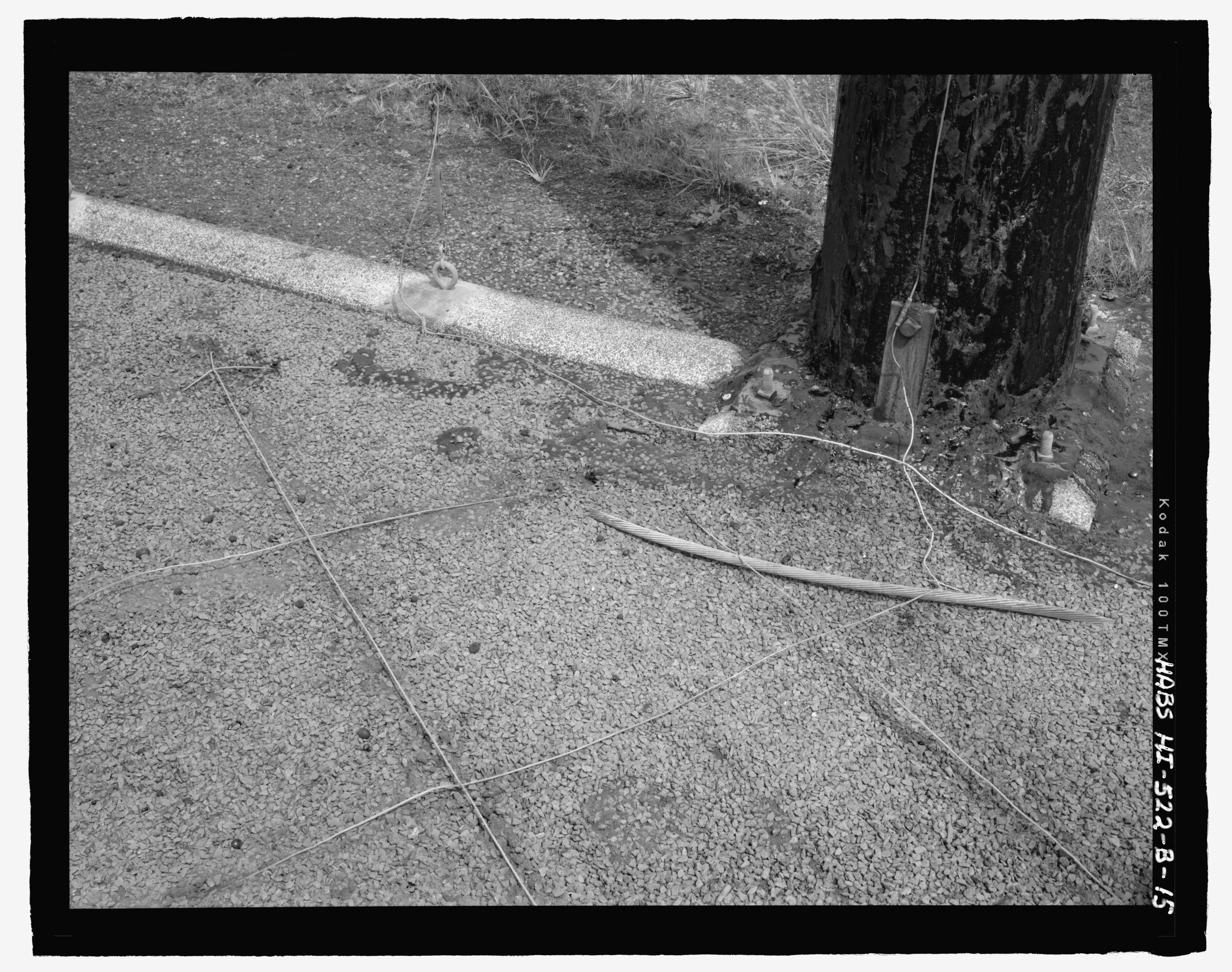
A close up of the 2 ft square grounding grid

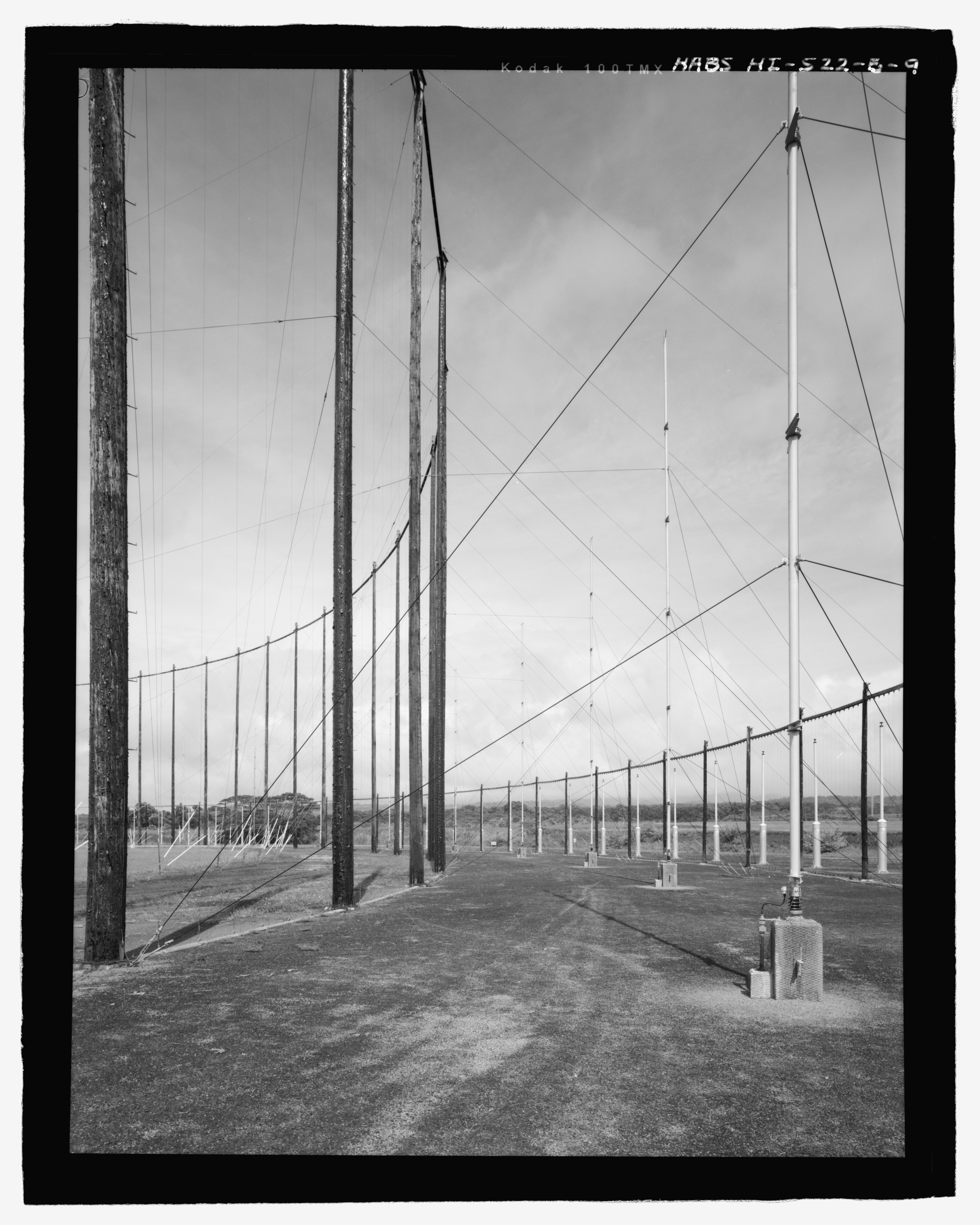
Detail of the low band reflector (left) and low band antenna (right)

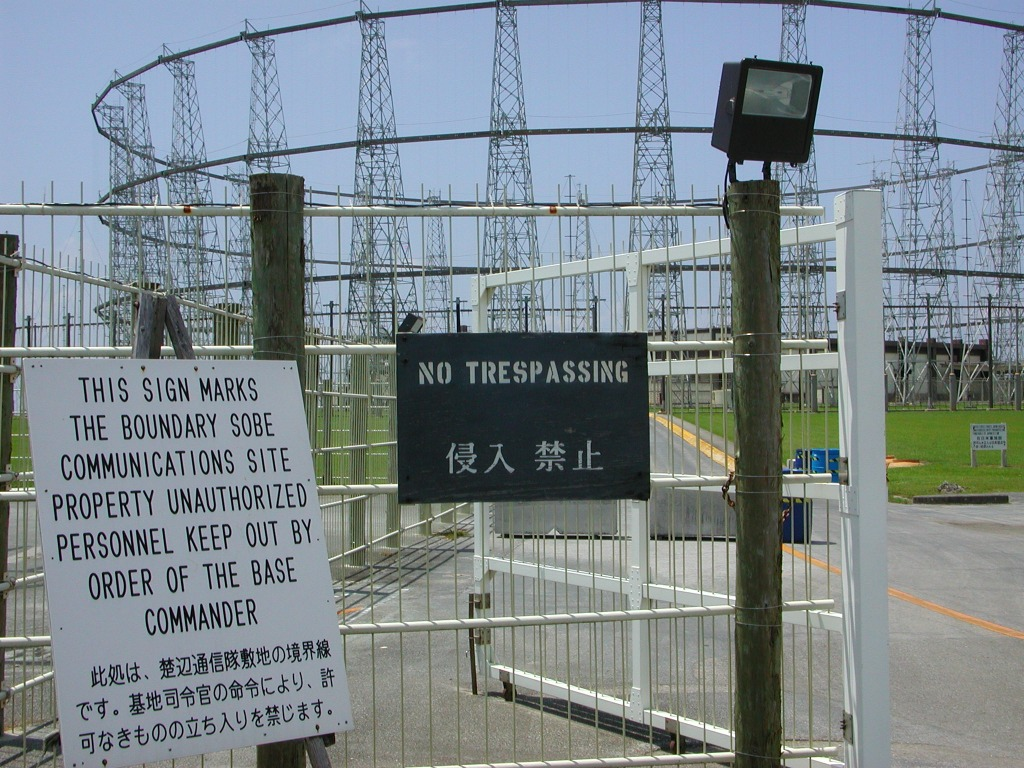
Sobe Communications Site, NSGA Hanza, Okinawa.

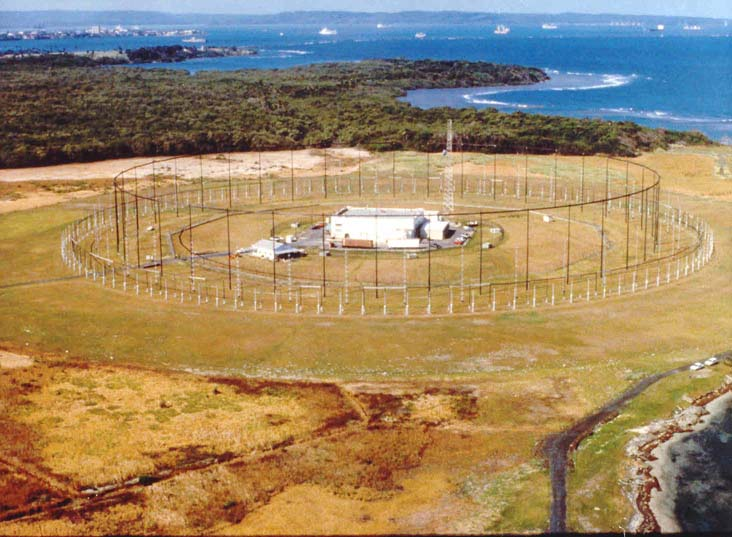
NSGA Galeta Island, Panama site.

== See also ==
- High-frequency direction finding
- Radio direction finder
- Radio direction finding
- Direction finding
- Signals intelligence (SIGINT)
- List of military electronics of the United States
