= Circularly disposed antenna array =

Circular antenna for radio direction finding

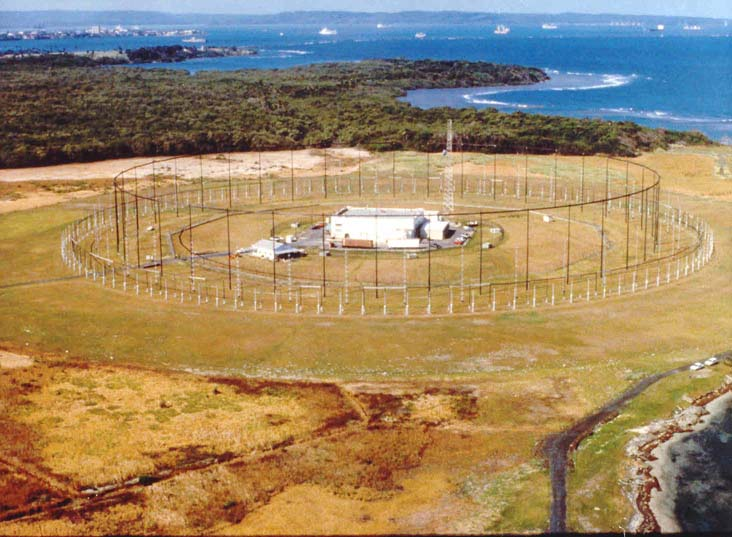
Direction-finding system Galeta Island, Panama

A circularly disposed antenna array (CDAA), sometimes referred to as a circularly disposed dipole array (CDDA) or a wullenweber, is a large circular antenna array used for radio direction finding. They are used by military and government agencies to triangulate radio signals for radio navigation, intelligence gathering, search and rescue, and enforcement of broadcasting laws. Because their huge circular reflecting screens look like circular fences, some antennas have been colloquially referred to as "elephant cages". The term "wullenweber" was the World War II German cover term used to identify their secret CDAA research and development program; its name is unrelated to any person involved in the program.

Many such CDAA systems are used by many nations, including Canada, Germany, Japan, Russia, United Kingdom, and United States.

== History ==
=== Origin in World War II Germany ===
CDAA technology was developed by the German navy communication research command, Nachrichtenmittelversuchskommando (NVK) and Telefunken, working on the Wullenweber during the early years of World War II. The inventor was NVK group leader Dr. Hans Rindfleisch, who worked after the war as a Technical Director for the northern Germany official broadcast (Norddeutscher Rundfunk (NDR)). Technical team leaders were Dr. Joachim Pietzner, Dr. Hans Schellhoss, and Dr. Maximilian Wächtler. The last was a founder of Plath GmbH in 1954 and later a consultant to both Plath and Telefunken.

The first Wullenwever was built during the war at Skibsby, north-east of the city of Hjørring (in German: Hjörring), Denmark (57°29′10″N 10°00′38″E). It used 40 vertical radiator elements, placed on the arc of a circle with a diameter of 120 metres (390 ft). In an inner circle, 40 reflecting elements were placed behind the radiator elements, suspended from a structure of circular wooden support poles with a diameter of 112.5 meters. To more easily obtain true geographic bearings, the north and south elements were placed exactly on the north–south meridian.

=== Post-war development ===
Although Pietzner, Schellhoss, and Wächtler retired in West Germany, some of their second-echelon technicians were taken to the USSR after the war. At least 30 Krug (Russian for circle) arrays were installed all over the Soviet Union and allied countries in the 1950s, well before the U.S. military became interested and developed their CDAAs. Several Krugs were installed in pairs less than 10 kilometers from each other, apparently for radio navigation purposes. At least four Krugs were installed near Moscow; just to the north, east and south (55.46408°N 37.3698°E) of the city. The Krugs were used to track the early Sputnik satellites, using their 10 and 20 MHz beacons, and were instrumental in locating re-entry vehicles. The Soviet Krug arrays also use the 40-element CDAA configuration.

The array in Skibsby was extensively studied by the British and then destroyed following the war in accordance with the Geneva Convention. Dr. Wächtler arranged to have a second array built, at Telefunken expense, at Langenargen/Bodensee, for further experimentation after the war. In the years following the war, the U.S. disassembled the Langenargen / Bodensee array and brought it back to the U.S., where it became known as the "Wullenweber" array.

One of the German antenna researchers, Dr. Rolf Wundt, was one of hundreds of German scientists taken to the U.S. by the Army after the war under Operation Paperclip. He arrived in New York in March 1947 on the same ship as Wernher von Braun and his wife and parents. He was first employed by the U.S. Air Force and then GT&E Sylvania Electronics Systems on CDAA and other antenna projects.

Professor Edgar Hayden, then a young engineer in the University of Illinois Radio Direction Finding Research Group, led the reassembly of the Wullenweber, studied the design and performance of HF/DF arrays and researched the physics of HF/DF under contract to the U.S. Navy from 1947 through 1960.

Hayden led the design and development of a large circularly disposed array at the university's Bondville Road Field Station, a few miles southwest of Bondville, IL. The array consisted of a ring of 120 vertical monopoles covering 2–20 MHz. Tall wood poles supported a 1,000-foot diameter (300 m) circular screen of vertical wires located within the ring of monopoles. His research is still used today to guide the design and site selection of HF/DF arrays. Records of his research are available in the university's archives. Hayden was later employed by Southwest Research Institute where he continued to contribute to HF direction finding technology.

=== The 1960s–1970s construction boom and subsequent demolition ===
In 1959, the U.S. Navy contracted with ITT Federal Systems to deploy a worldwide network of AN/FRD-10 HF/DF arrays based on lessons learned from the Bondville experimental array.

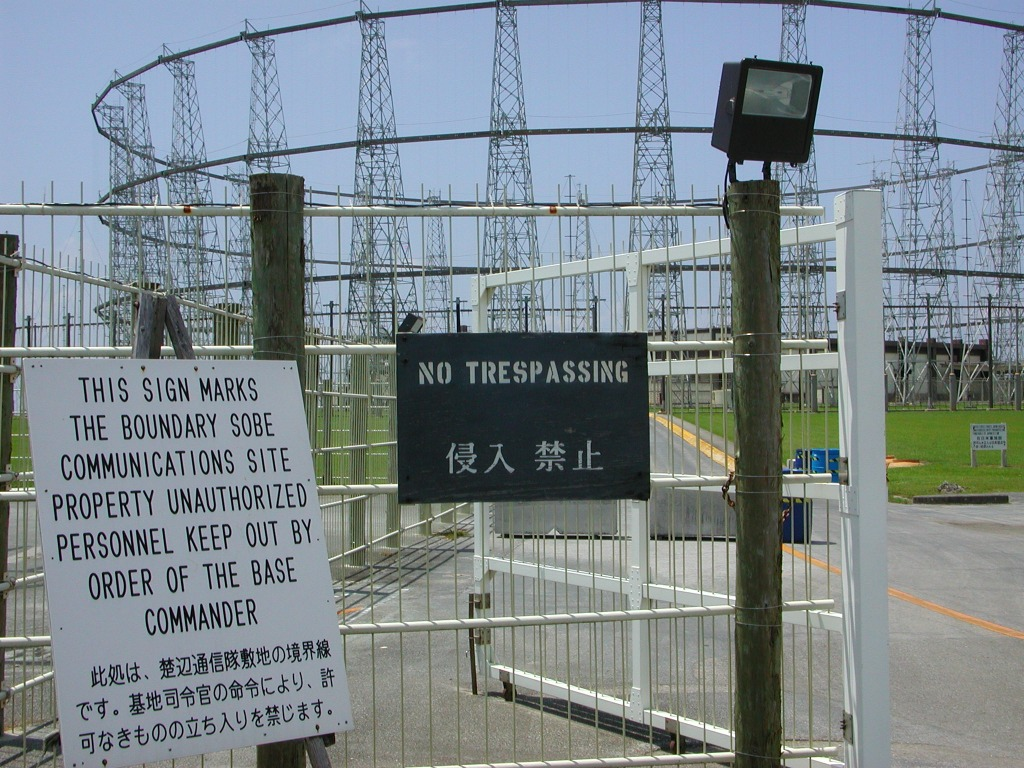
CDAA at US Navy Sobe Communications base, Yomitan, Okinawa, Japan

The FRD-10 at NSGA Hanza, Okinawa was the first installed, in 1962, followed by eleven additional arrays, with the last completed in 1964 at NRRF Imperial Beach, CA. (Silver Strand) which was demolished in 2014. Due to their immense size, the location of the Bondville array (40.0494°N 88.3807°W) and the other post-war antenna arrays are clearly visible in high-resolution aerial photography now available on the internet.

Also in 1959, a contract to build a larger CDAA — the AN/FLR-9 antenna receiving system — was awarded by the U.S. Air Force to GT&E Sylvania Electronics Systems (now General Dynamics Mission Systems).

The first FLR-9 was installed at RAF Chicksands (52.0443°N 0.389182°W) in the United Kingdom in 1962. The second FLR-9 was installed at San Vito dei Normanni Air Station (40.64700°N 17.83900°E), Italy also in 1962. Following base closures, the arrays at Chicksands and San Vito were dismantled in 1996 and 1993, respectively.

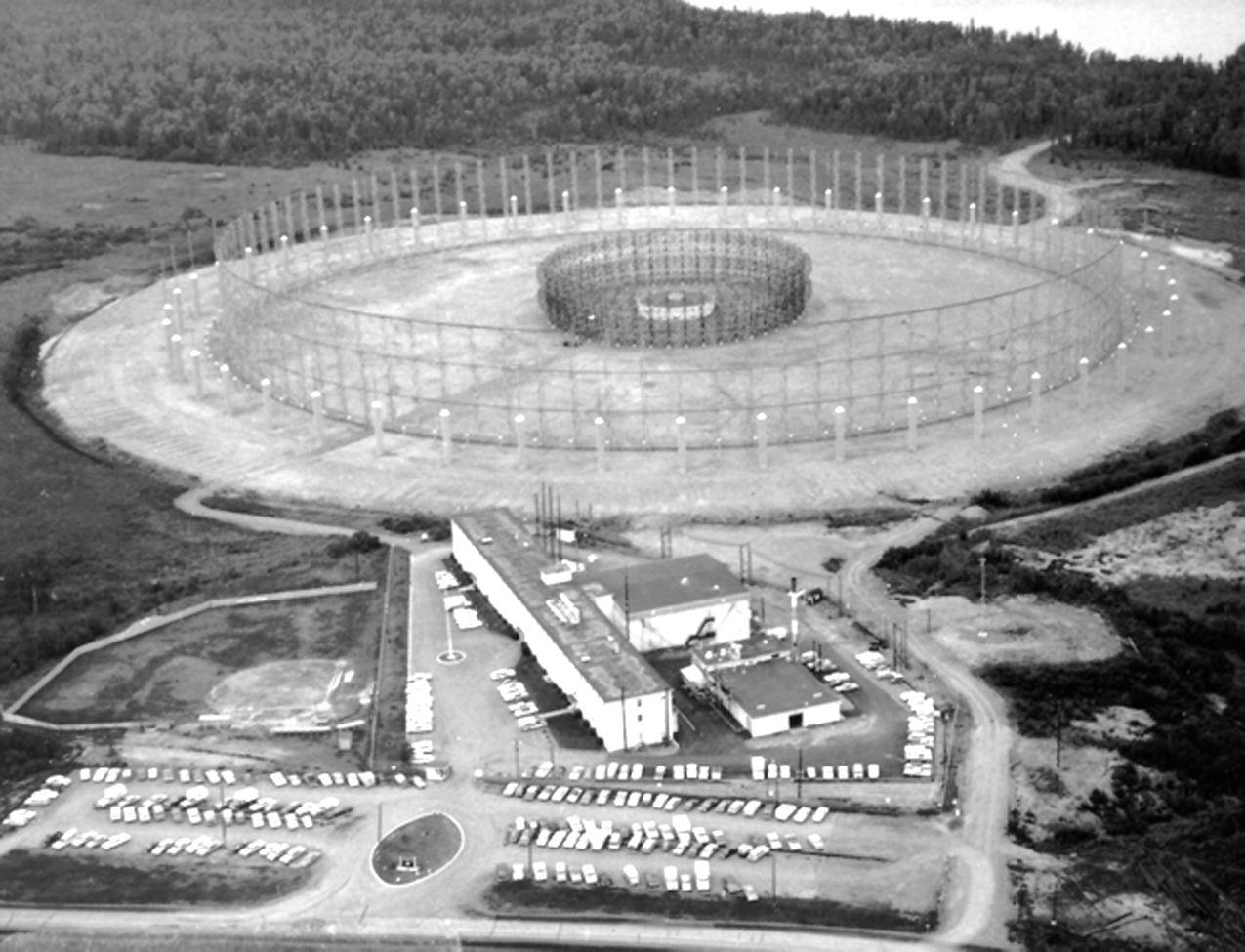
FLR-9 circularly disposed antenna array at Elmendorf Air Force Base, Alaska, USA, completed in 1966.

A second contract was awarded to Sylvania to install AN/FLR-9 systems at Misawa AB, Japan; Clark AB, Philippine Islands; Pakistan (never built); Elmendorf AFB, Alaska; and Karamürsel AS, Turkey. The last two were completed in 1966. The Karamürsel AS was closed and array was dismantled in 1977 in retribution for the suspension of U.S. military aid to Turkey. The Clark AB array was decommissioned after the Mt. Pinatubo volcano eruption in 1991. It was later converted into an outdoor amphitheater which is part of the Nayong Pilipino Clark theme park. Demolition of the Misawa FLR-9 began in October 2014.

A pair of FRD-10s not equipped for HF/DF were installed in 1969 at NAVRADSTA(R) Sugar Grove, WV (38.5129°N 79.2790°W), for naval HF communications, replacing the NSS receiver site at the Naval Communications Station in Cheltenham, Maryland.

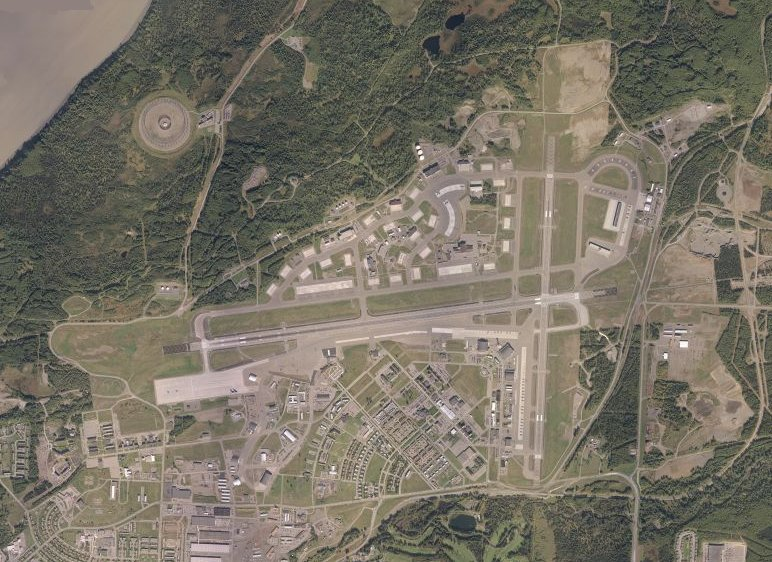
An overhead view of Elmendorf AFB, Alaska, in late 2002. The antenna array is the large circle in the forested area, in the upper left, comparable in size to the adjacent airstrip.

The Elmendorf array was decommissioned in May 2016 due to its age and unavailable repair parts.

The U.S. Army awarded a contract in 1968 to F&M Systems to build AN/FLR-9 systems for USASA Field Station Augsburg, Germany, and Ramasun Station in Udon Thani, Thailand (17.2919°N 102.8682°E). Both were installed in 1970. The Ramasun Station array was dismantled in 1975 following base closure.

During the 1970s, the Japanese government installed two large antenna arrays, similar to the FRD-10, at Chitose and Miho.

=== Surviving arrays and replacements ===
The last two FRD-10 HF/DF arrays were installed in 1971 for the Canadian Forces in Gander, Newfoundland (48.9511°N 54.5252°W) and Masset, British Columbia (54.0288°N 132.0654°W). After the Hanza array was decommissioned in 2006, the Canadian Armed Forces became the operators of one of the last two existing FRD-10 arrays.

Later in the 1970s, Plessey (now Roke Manor Research Limited) of the United Kingdom developed the smaller, more economical Pusher CDAA array. At least 25 Pusher CDAAs were installed in many countries around the world. Several Pusher arrays were installed in U.S. military facilities, where the array is known as the AN/FRD-13.

In 1998 the Augsburg array (48.45121°N 10.86275°E)—located in Gablingen, a town in the north of Augsburg—was turned over to the Bundesnachrichtendienst. Technology enthusiasts, reporters, and even local politicians are still not admitted to the complex and there are few official statements about its purpose. The area was greyed out in the map layers of Google Maps and Bing Maps. Therefore, it is believed to be still in service being used by BND and NSA as part of a larger complex of combined informational technology.

=== Post–Cold War arrays ===
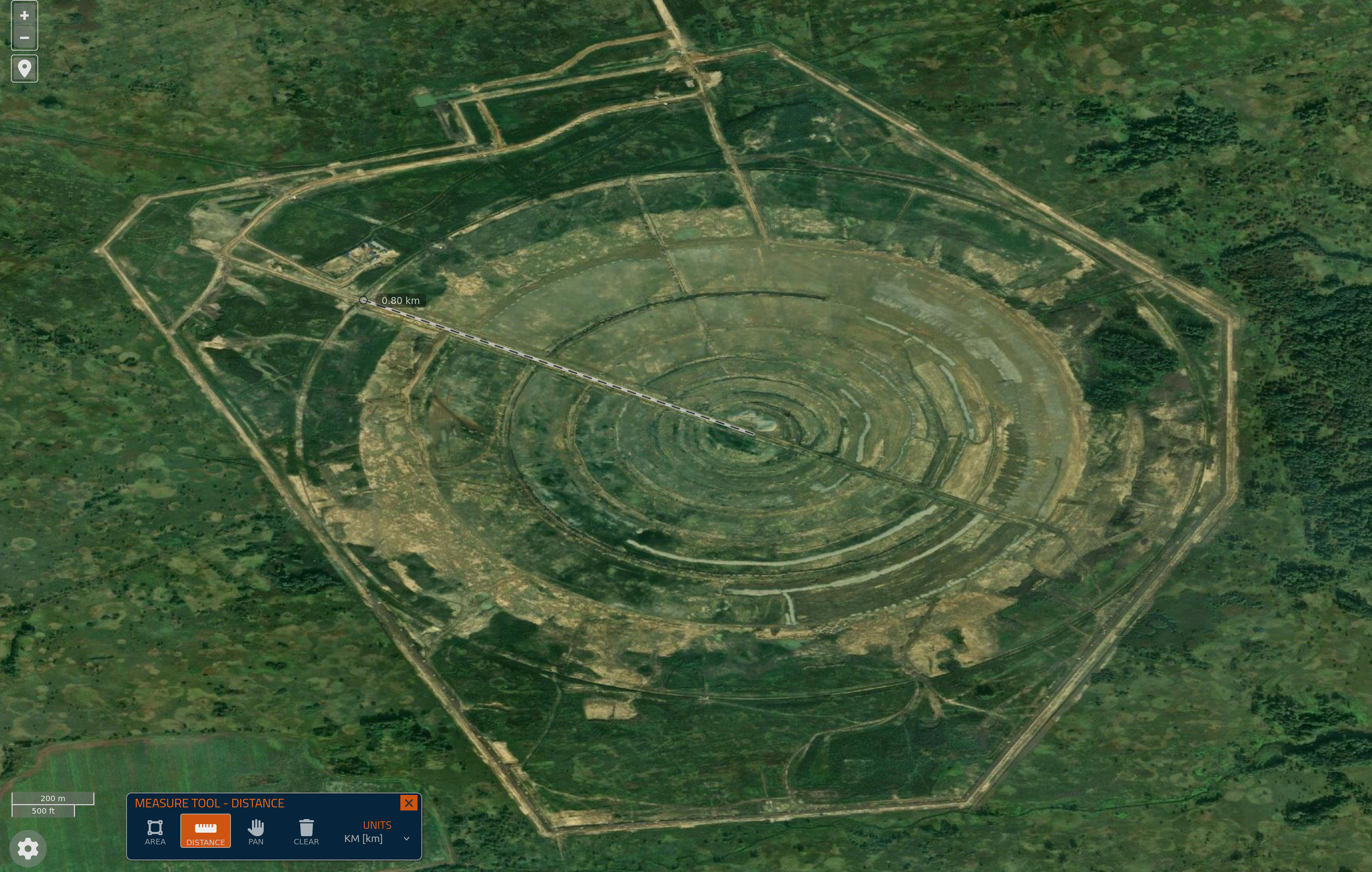
Satellite imagery of the 0.8 km radius Chernyakhovsk CDAA

As of November 2020 the Strategic Reconnaissance Command of the German Armed Forces operates as one of its three stationary Sigint battalions a 410 metres (1,350 ft) wide circularly disposed array in Bramstedtlund. It was inaugurated in 1995 with construction started in 1989.

In August 2025 media reported on Chernyakhovsk CDAA, an almost finished, 1,600 m wide circularly disposed array circa 5 km southeast of the Chernyakhovsk airbase in the Kaliningrad enclave.

== See also ==
- HF/DF
- Radio direction finder
- Radio direction finding
- Direction finding
- AN/FLR-9, a Wullenweber-class antenna array
- SIGINT
- Silver Strand Training Complex
