= Chernyakhovsk (air base) =

Air base of the Russian Navy's Baltic Fleet

Chernyakhovsk
- Черняхо́вск
- Chernyakhovsk, Kaliningrad Oblast in Russia
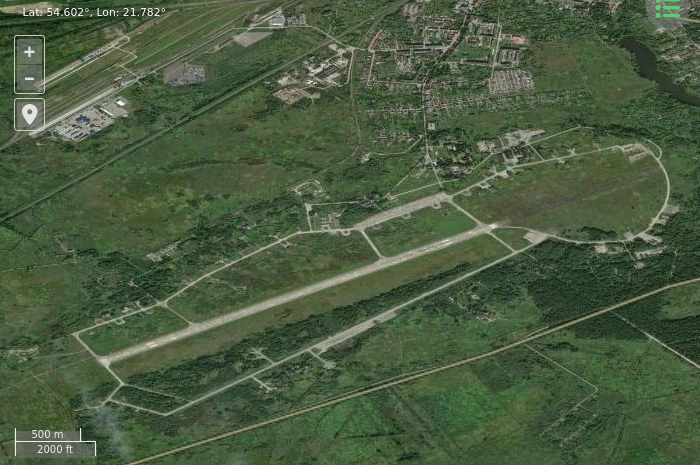
- Satellite imagery of Chernyakhovsk air base

Site information
- Type: Air Base
- Owner: Ministry of Defence
- Operator: Russian Navy
- Controlled by: Baltic Fleet

Location
- Shown within Kaliningrad Oblast Chernyakhovsk (Russia)
- Coordinates: 54°36′6″N 21°46′54″E

Site history
- Built: 1945
- In use: 1945 - present

Airfield information
- Elevation: 40 metres (131 ft) AMSL
Runways
Direction	Length and surface
06/24	2,500 metres (8,202 ft) Concrete

Chernyakhovsk Air Base (Russian: Черняхо́вск) is a military air base of the Russian Navy's Baltic Fleet, located 4 km south-west of the city of Chernyakhovsk in Kaliningrad Oblast, Russia. It is a medium-sized interceptor airfield, listed as a nuclear bomber base by a Natural Resources Defense Council study.

The base is home to the 4th Guards Naval Attack Aviation Regiment which uses the Sukhoi Su-30SM (ASCC: Flanker-H), and Sukhoi Su-24M (ASCC: Fencer-D) under the 34th Composite Aviation Division.

The unit has also been called the 4th Independent Guards Naval Assault Aviation Regiment and the 4th Guards Composite Aviation Regiment.

One of the main regiments at the base was the 4th Guards Maritime Assault Aviation Regiment, known up until 1989 as the 4th Guards Bomber Aviation Regiment. The 4th Guards was formed from 31st Bomber Aviation Regiment on 6 December 1941. The regiment moved into the base from nearby Kaliningrad Chkalovsk, also in the Kaliningrad Oblast, on 18 October 1952. In August 1987 it absorbed the 63rd Bomber Aviation Regiment. On 10.12.89 the regiment was renamed 4th Guards Maritime Assault Aviation Regiment. The regiment was equipped with the Il-28 from August 1951 – 1964, the Yak-28, 1964–1974, the Sukhoi Su-24 'Fencer,' 1974-1987 (up to 29 examples flown), and the Su-24M, 1987–2004. The regiment was assigned to the 30th Air Army, from July 1964 - July 1968, the 132nd Bomber Aviation Division from July 1968 - 12.89, the 132nd Maritime Assault Aviation Division, 12.89 - 1994, and the Baltic Fleet from 1994 - 2004.

The airfield was also home to 15 ODRAP (15th Independent Long-Range Reconnaissance Regiment). A few sources cite the airfield as being a Tupolev Tu-16 base during the 1960s or 1970s.

Sukhoi Su-27 fighters were spotted during 2015 at the base.

As of August 2025 construction of the Chernyakhovsk CDAA circa 5 km southeast of the base is close to completion.

== See also ==
- Chernyakhovsk CDAA – Russian circularly disposed antenna array in Kaliningrad enclave
- Khrabrovo Airport – Main airport in Kaliningrad, Russia
- List of military airbases in Russia

== Sources ==
- Mason, R. A. (1986). Aircraft, Strategy and Operations of the Soviet Air Force. Jane's Publishing Company Limited. ISBN 0-7106-0373-8.
